= No. 4 Group RAF =

Royal Air Force group, originally formed in the First World War

- Royal Air Force Ensign
- Active: 1 April 1918 – 24 March 1919; 1 April 1937 – 2 February 1948
- Country: United Kingdom
- Branch: Royal Air Force
- Type: Royal Air Force group
- Role: Strategic and tactical bombing (1937 - 1945); Military transport (1945 - 1948)
- Part of: RAF Bomber Command (April 1937 – May 1945); RAF Transport Command (May 1945 – February 1948)
- Group Headquarters: RAF Linton-on-Ouse (April 1937 – January 1940); Heslington Hall (January 1940 – February 1948)

Commanders
- Notable commanders: Marshal of the Royal Air Force Arthur "Bomber" Harris

No. 4 Group RAF (4Gp) was a Royal Air Force group, originally formed in the First World War, and reformed in the lead up to the Second World War, mostly part of RAF Bomber Command, but ending its days in RAF Transport Command.

== History ==
=== Formation in the First World War ===
No. 4 Group was originally formed in October 1918 at the Seaplane Experimental Station, Felixstowe just before the end of the First World War and disbanded a year later in 1919. In its first incarnation, No. 4 Group was created by augmenting the former Royal Naval Air Service group at RNAS Great Yarmouth which had been responsible for anti-submarine and anti-Zeppelin operations over the North Sea. The former RNAS group was designated as No. 73 Wing within the new No. 4 Group. The commanding officer of No. 4 Group was Colonel C R Samson. With the 1918–1919 postwar demobilization of the RAF, No. 4 Group was disbanded on 24 March 1919.

=== Reformation in the Second World War ===
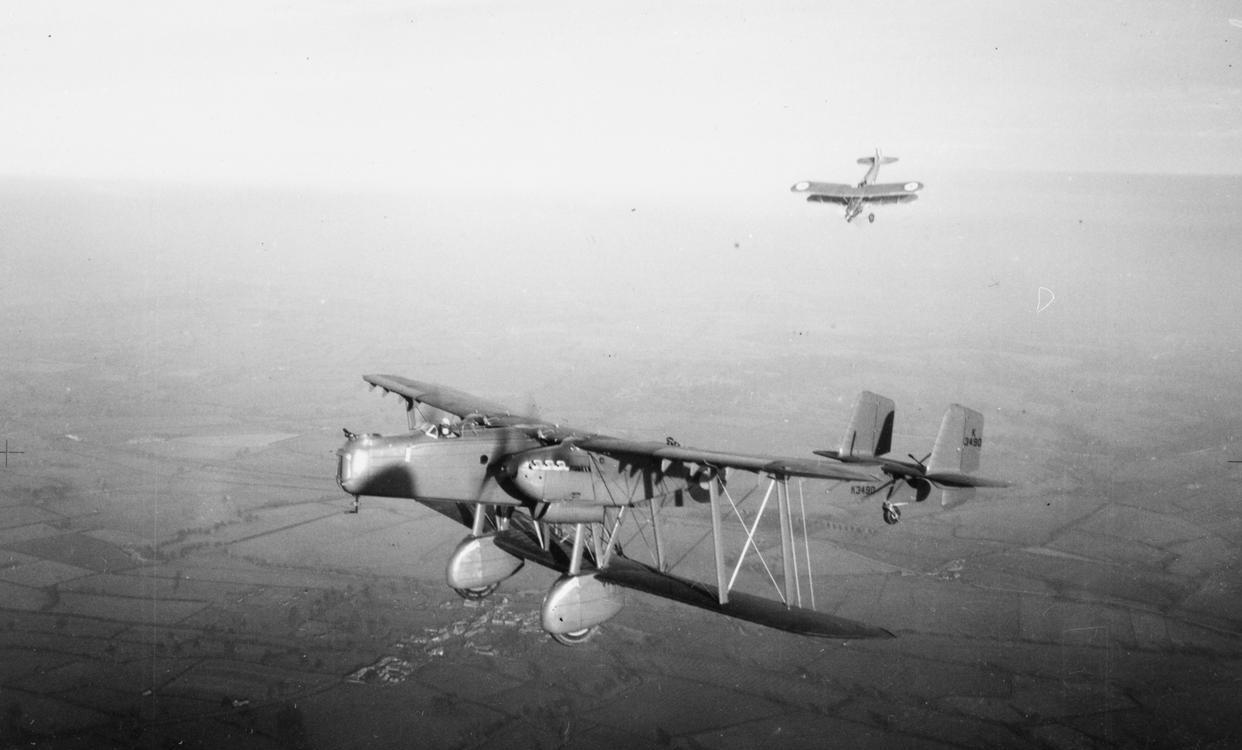
A Handley Page Heyford

With the buildup of the RAF prior to the outbreak of the Second World War, No. 4 Group was reformed on 1 April 1937 as part of RAF Bomber Command based at RAF Mildenhall, Suffolk under A/Cdre Arthur Harris (later Air Vice-Marshal "Bomber" Harris). On 29 June 1937 the headquarters were relocated at RAF Linton-on-Ouse, Yorkshire when 4 Group took over a number of stations and squadrons from No. 3 Group RAF. 4 Group was primarily based in Yorkshire for the duration of the war. Its airfields became further concentrated south and east of York when 6 Group was formed (1 March 1943) using airfields north of the city. The flying units of those were these, mainly flying with the Handley Page Heyford biplane bomber:

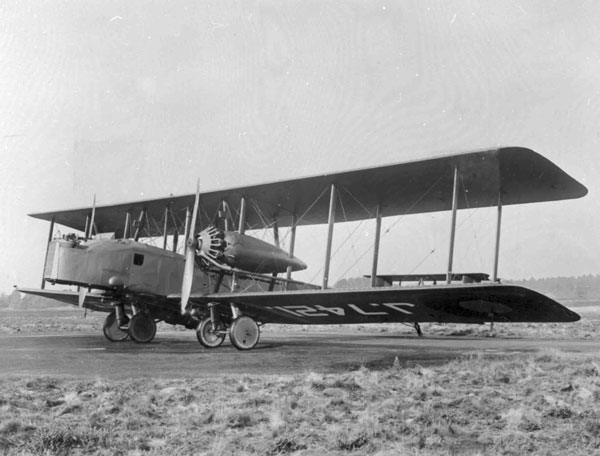
A Vickers Virginia

Order of battle for no. 4 Group RAF, 29 June 1937, data from
Base	Squadron	Aircraft	Version
RAF Dishforth	No. 10 Squadron RAF No. 78 Squadron RAF	Handley Page Heyford; Armstrong Whitworth Whitley; Handley Page Heyford	Mks.IA, III; Mk.I; Mks.II, III
RAF Driffield	No. 77 Squadron RAF; No. 102 Squadron RAF	Hawker Audax; Handley Page Heyford	Mks.II, III
RAF Finningley	No. 7 Squadron RAF No. 76 Squadron RAF	Handley Page Heyford; Vickers Wellesley; Vickers Wellesley	Mks.II, III; Mk.I; Mk.I
RAF Leconfield	No. 166 Squadron RAF	Handley Page Heyford	Mk.III
RAF Linton-on-Ouse (Previously at RAF Boscombe Down)	No. 51 Squadron RAF No. 58 Squadron RAF	Vickers Virginia; Avro Anson; Vickers Virginia; Avro Anson	Mk.X; Mk.I; Mk.X; Mk.I

The group's first operation was on the night of 3 September 1939 when ten Whitley Mk.IIIs of Nos. 51 and 58 Squadrons took off to drop leaflets in the Ruhr and over Hamburg and Bremen. By this time the group had shrunk to six squadrons and the equipment had been standardised to the Armstrong Whitworth Whitley. RAF Finningley had gone over to No. 5 Group RAF and RAF Leconfield was "Under care and Maintenance" by No. 4 Group.

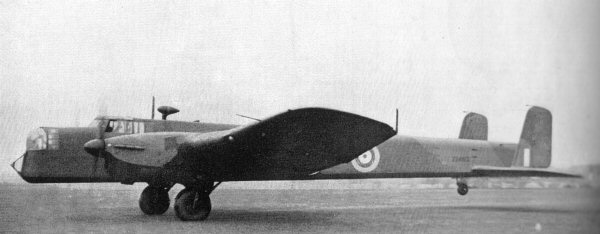
An Armstrong Whitworth Whitley

Order of battle for no. 4 Group RAF, 26 September 1939, data from
Base	Squadron	Aircraft	Version
RAF Dishforth	No. 10 Squadron RAF; No. 78 Squadron RAF	Armstrong Whitworth Whitley; Armstrong Whitworth Whitley	Mks.I, IV; Mks.I, IV
RAF Driffield	No. 77 Squadron RAF; No. 102 Squadron RAF	Armstrong Whitworth Whitley; Armstrong Whitworth Whitley	Mks.III, V Mk.III
RAF Linton-on-Ouse	No. 51 Squadron RAF; No. 58 Squadron RAF	Armstrong Whitworth Whitley; Armstrong Whitworth Whitley	Mks.II, III; Mks.I, II, III

The first land bombing mission was by 26 out of 30 Whitleys from Nos. 10, 102, 77 and 51 Squadrons detailed to attack the seaplane base at Hornum on 20 March 1940. In April 1940 the group moved its headquarters to Heslington Hall, near York. In August/September 1940 No. 4 Group took part in eight attacks on Berlin, oil targets and ports. On 1 April 1941 104 Squadron was formed at RAF Driffield as part of No. 4 Group, equipped with the Vickers Wellington and carried out night bombing operations from May 1941 until February 1942.

On 24 July 1941, 4 Group dropped 2,000 lb bombs on the Scharnhorst and Gneisenau and helped to keep these battle-cruisers locked in Brest until 12 February 1942. By January 1942 the Group had grown considerably and was made out of the following flying units, which were in full conversion from the Whitley to the Vickers Wellington medium and Handley Page Halifax heavy bomber:

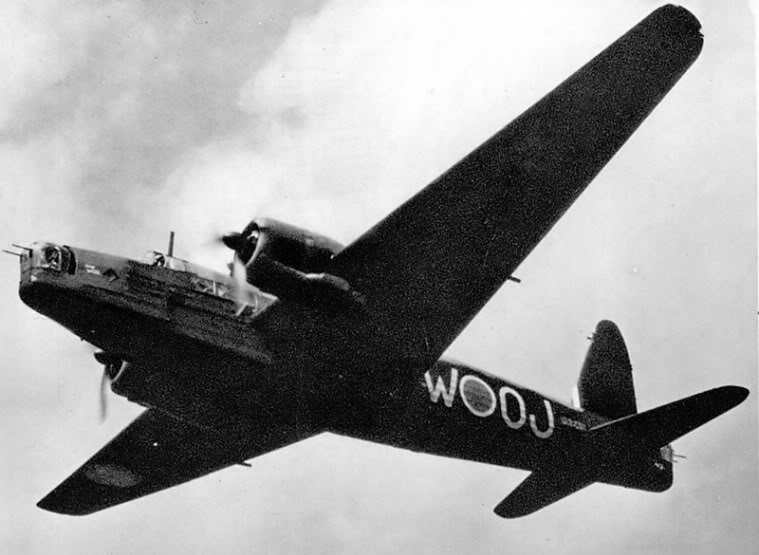
A Vickers Wellington

Order of battle for no. 4 Group RAF, 9 January 1942, data from
Base	Squadron	Aircraft	Version
RAF Dishforth	No. 51 Squadron RAF	Armstrong Whitworth Whitley	Mk.V
RAF Driffield	No. 104 Squadron RAF	Vickers Wellington	Mk.II
RAF Leeming	No. 10 Squadron RAF; No. 77 Squadron RAF	Handley Page Halifax; Armstrong Whitworth Whitley	Mk.II; Mk.V
RAF Leconfield	No. 98 Squadron RAF	Armstrong Whitworth Whitley	Mk.V (non-operational)
RAF Linton-on-Ouse	No. 35 Squadron RAF; No. 58 Squadron RAF	Handley Page Halifax; Armstrong Whitworth Whitley	Mks.I, II; Mk.V
RAF Middleton St. George	No. 76 Squadron RAF; No. 78 Squadron RAF	Handley Page Halifax; Armstrong Whitworth Whitley	Mks.I, II; Mk.V
RAF Pocklington	No. 405 Squadron RCAF	Vickers Wellington	Mk.II
RAF Stradishall	No. 138 Squadron RAF	Armstrong Whitworth Whitley	Mk.V
RAF Topcliffe	No. 102 Squadron RAF	Handley Page Halifax; Armstrong Whitworth Whitley	Mk.II; Mk.V (operational on Whitleys)

On 30/31 May 1942 No. 4 Group played its part in the 1000 bomber raid on Cologne, providing 154 aircraft and the follow-up raid on Essen, providing 142 aircraft. In early 1943 No. 4 Group made a substantial contribution in the Battle of the Ruhr, which lasted until July. Losses were heavy but the results worthwhile. By March 1943 the group was made out of these flying units, conversion to the Halifax and Wellington was almost finished (some squadrons having still one or two Whitleys at hand):

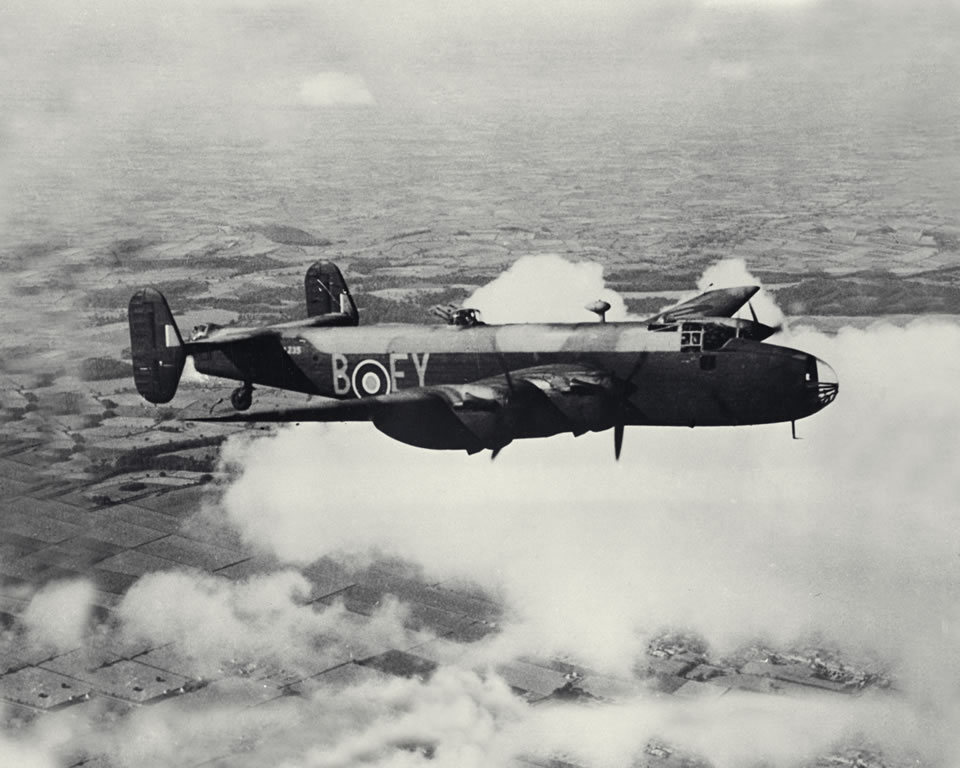
A Halifax B.Mk.II of 78 Squadron, one of the squadrons of No. 4 Group.

Order of battle for no. 4 Group RAF, 4 March 1943, data from
Base	Squadron	Aircraft	Version
RAF Burn	No. 431 Squadron RCAF	Vickers Wellington	Mk.X
RAF East Moor	No. 429 Squadron RCAF	Vickers Wellington	Mks.III, X
RAF Elvington	No. 77 Squadron RAF	Handley Page Halifax	Mks.II, V
RAF Leconfield	No. 196 Squadron RAF; No. 466 Squadron RAAF	Vickers Wellington; Vickers Wellington	Mk.X; Mk.X
RAF Linton-on-Ouse	No. 76 Squadron RAF; No. 78 Squadron RAF	Handley Page Halifax; Handley Page Halifax	Mks.II, V Mk.II
RAF Melbourne	No. 10 Squadron RAF	Handley Page Halifax	Mk.II
RAF Pocklington	No. 102 Squadron RAF	Handley Page Halifax	Mk.II
RAF Rufforth	No. 158 Squadron RAF	Handley Page Halifax	Mk.II
RAF Snaith	No. 51 Squadron RAF	Handley Page Halifax	Mk.II

No. 4 Group controlled the following bases at various times between March 1943 and September 1945
No. 41 Base	No. 42 Base	No. 43 Base	No. 44 Base
RAF Marston Moor (HQ)	RAF Pocklington (HQ)	RAF Driffield (HQ)	RAF Holme-on-Spalding Moor (HQ)
RAF Acaster Malbis	RAF Elvington	RAF Leconfield	RAF Breighton
RAF Riccall	RAF Melbourne	RAF Lissett	RAF Melbourne
RAF Rufforth	RAF Pocklington		
	RAF Full Sutton		

In May/June 1944, 4 Group welcomed two French heavy-bomber squadrons - Nos. 346 and 347 Squadrons - to RAF Elvington. On that station a gradual changeover from RAF to French Air Force personnel was effected, so that by September 1944, the station was almost exclusively French and commanded by an officer of the French Air Force. In July 1944 the group looked like this, having pretty much standardised on the Halifax B.Mk.III:

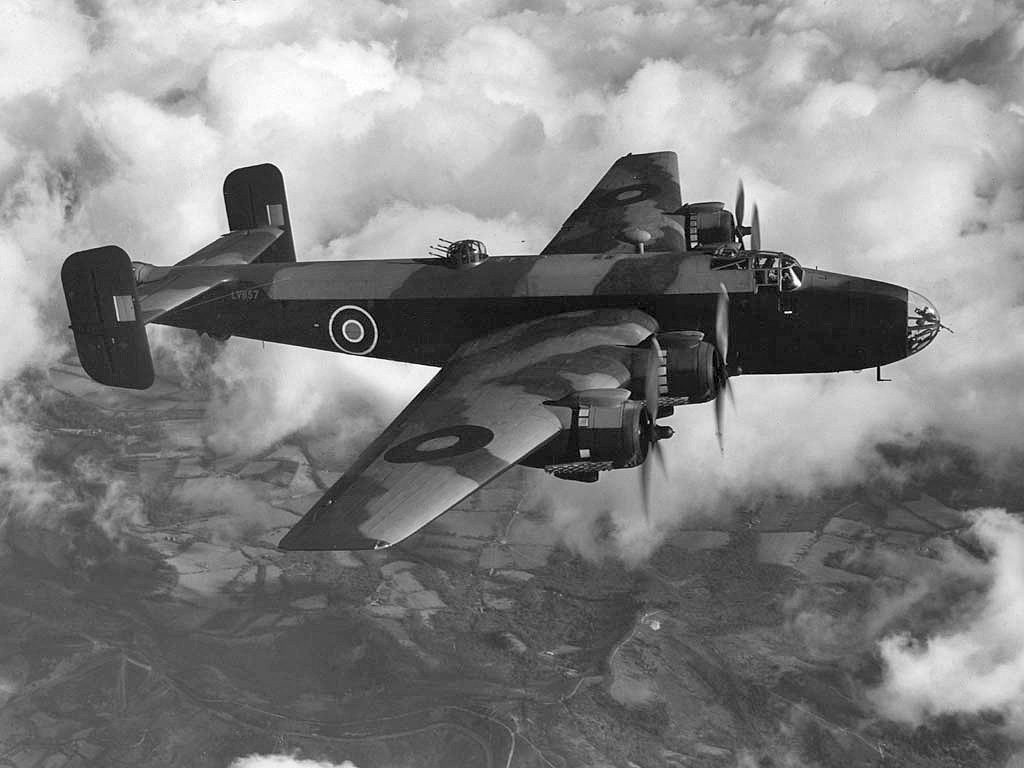
A Halifax B.Mk.III

Order of battle for no. 4 Group RAF, July 1944, data from
Base	Squadron	Aircraft	Version
RAF Breighton	No. 78 Squadron RAF	Handley Page Halifax	Mk.III
RAF Burn	No. 578 Squadron RAF	Handley Page Halifax	Mk.III
RAF Driffield	No. 466 Squadron RAAF	Handley Page Halifax	Mk.III
RAF Elvington	No. 346 Squadron RAF; No. 347 Squadron RAF	Handley Page Halifax; Handley Page Halifax	Mk.III; Mks.III, V
RAF Full Sutton	No. 77 Squadron RAF	Handley Page Halifax	Mk.III
RAF Holme-on-Spalding Moor	No. 76 Squadron RAF	Handley Page Halifax	Mk.III
RAF Leconfield	No. 640 Squadron RAF	Handley Page Halifax	Mk.III
RAF Lissett	No. 158 Squadron RAF	Handley Page Halifax	Mk.III
RAF Melbourne	No. 10 Squadron RAF	Handley Page Halifax	Mk.III
RAF Pocklington	No. 102 Squadron RAF	Handley Page Halifax	Mks.III, IIIa
RAF Snaith	No. 51 Squadron RAF	Handley Page Halifax	Mk.III

Prior to the invasion of Normandy in June 1944 intense attacks began on French marshalling yards and gun emplacements on the French coast, troop concentrations and V-weapon sites, reaching a peak in August when 3,629 sorties were flown. In addition No. 4 Group undertook urgent transport work and in little more than one week ferried 432,840 gallons of petrol to the British Second Army during Operation Market Garden.

In 1945, 4 Group attacked targets at Hanover, Magdeburg, Stuttgart, Cologne, Munster and Osnabrück plus the Sterkrade, Wanne-Eickel, Bottrop and many other synthetic-oil centres, bombing by day and night. Its attention later transferred to bombing railway centres in preparation for the crossing of the Rhine.

It is reported that No. 102 Squadron RAF was transferred out of the Group to Transport Command on 8 March 1945.

During the war 61,577 operational sorties were flown, the group trained many Bomber Command crews and helped to create two other bomber groups. On 7 May 1945 No. 4 Group was transferred to Transport Command, and by July 1945 the group consisted of the following flying units:

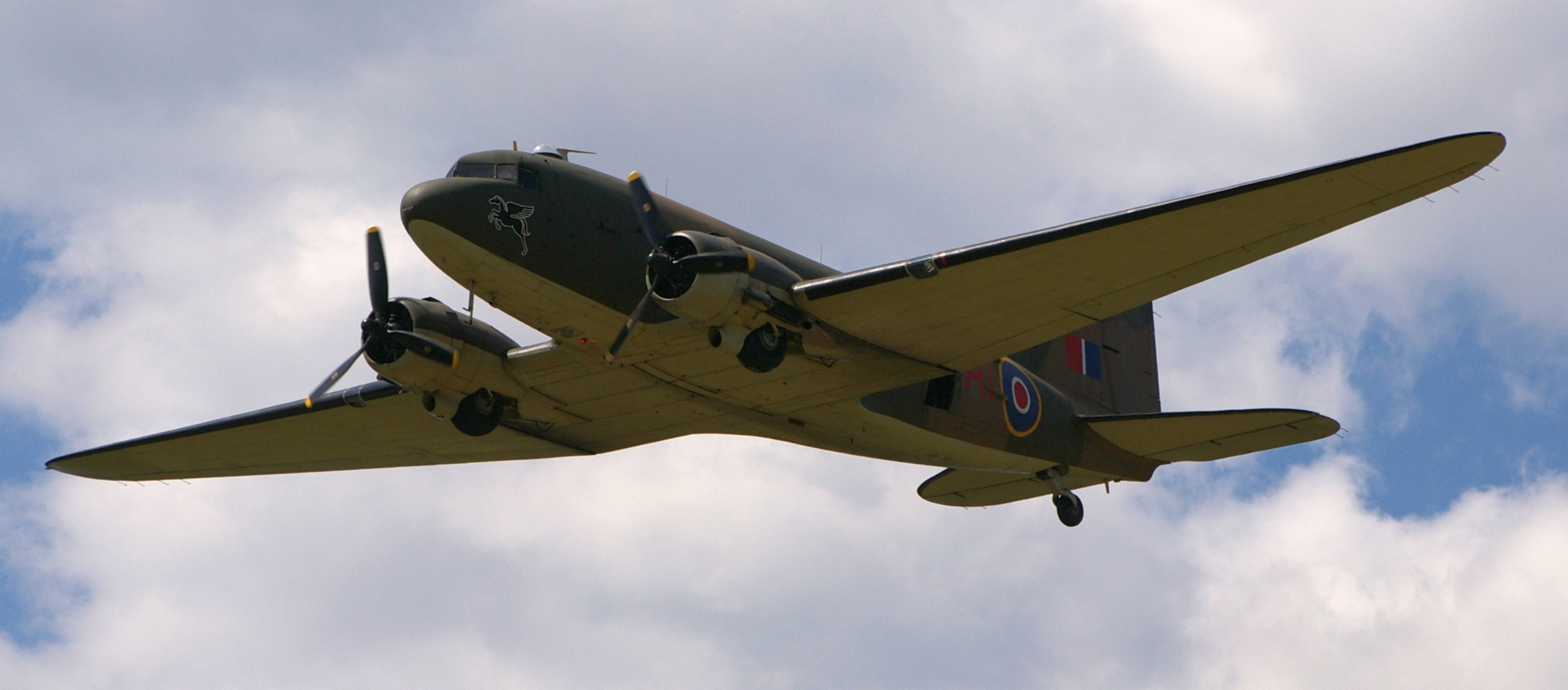
A Douglas Dakota in RAF colours.

A RAF Consolidated Liberator.

Order of battle for no. 4 Group RAF, July 1945, data from
Base	Squadron	Aircraft	Version
RAF Bramcote	No. 105 (Transport) Operational Training Unit	Vickers Wellington; Douglas Dakota	Mks.Ic, X Mks.III, IV
RAF Breighton	No. 78 Squadron RAF	Handley Page Halifax; Douglas Dakota	Mk.VI; Mk.IV
RAF Crosby-on-Eden	No. 109 Operational Training Unit RAF	Douglas Dakota	Mks.III, IV
RAF Driffield	No. 426 Squadron RCAF	Consolidated Liberator	Mks.VI, VIII
RAF Elvington	No. 346 Squadron RAF; No. 347 Squadron RAF	Handley Page Halifax; Handley Page Halifax	Mk.VI; Mk.VI
RAF Full Sutton	No. 77 Squadron RAF	Handley Page Halifax; Douglas Dakota	Mk.VI; Mks.III, IV
RAF Holme-on-Spalding Moor	No. 76 Squadron RAF	Handley Page Halifax; Douglas Dakota	Mk.VI; Mk.IV
RAF Leconfield	No. 51 Squadron RAF	Short Stirling	Mk.V
RAF Lissett	No. 158 Squadron RAF	Handley Page Halifax; Short Stirling	Mk.VI; Mk.V
RAF Melbourne	No. 10 Squadron RAF	Handley Page Halifax	Mk.III
RAF Pocklington	No. 102 Squadron RAF	Handley Page Halifax	Mks.III, IIIa, VI
RAF Wymeswold	No. 108 OTU	Douglas Dakota	Mks.I, III, IV

== Commanders ==
- 1 April 1918 Colonel C R Samson
- 12 June 1937 Air Commodore Arthur T Harris
- 25 May 1938 Air Commodore C H B Blount
- 26 June 1939 Air Vice-Marshal Arthur Coningham
- 26 July 1941 Air Vice-Marshal C R Carr
- 12 February 1945 Air Vice-Marshal John R Whitley
- 7 May 1945 Air Vice-Marshal H S P Walmsley
- 15 December 1945 Air Vice-Marshal A C Stevens
- 2 October 1946 Air Commodore A P Revington

== See also ==
- List of Royal Air Force groups
- List of Royal Air Force aircraft squadrons
