= No. 158 Squadron RAF =

Defunct flying squadron of the Royal Air Force

- Active: 9 May 1918 – 20 Nov 1918; 14 Feb 1942 – 31 Dec 1945
- Country: United Kingdom
- Branch: Royal Air Force
- Role: Bomber Squadron; Transport Squadron
- Part of: No. 4 Group RAF, Bomber Command (Feb 42 – Jun 45); No. 4 Group RAF, Transport Command (Jun 45 – Dec 45)
- Motto: Strength in unity

Insignia
- Squadron Badge heraldry: A circular chain of seven links The chain is indicative of the combined strength and co-operation of aircrews
- Squadron Codes: NP (Apr 1942 – Jun 1945); DK (Jul 1945 – Dec 1945)
- Tail markings: Two diagonal yellow stripes (Apr 1945 – May 1945)

Aircraft flown
- Bomber: Vickers Wellington; Handley Page Halifax
- Transport: Short Stirling

No. 158 Squadron RAF was a World War I proposed ground attack squadron that did not become operational in time to see action, and a World War II bomber squadron. After World War II had ended in Europe the squadron operated in the transport role until disbandment in December 1945.

== History ==
=== Formation in World War I ===
No. 158 Squadron RAF was first formed on 9 May 1918, and the squadron was originally to be equipped with Sopwith Snipe fighters, but this was postponed and the squadron eventually formed at Upper Heyford on 4 September 1918, equipped with Sopwith Salamander ground attack aircraft. The squadron arrived too late to see action during the war, and disbanded on 20 November 1918.

=== Reformation and World War II ===
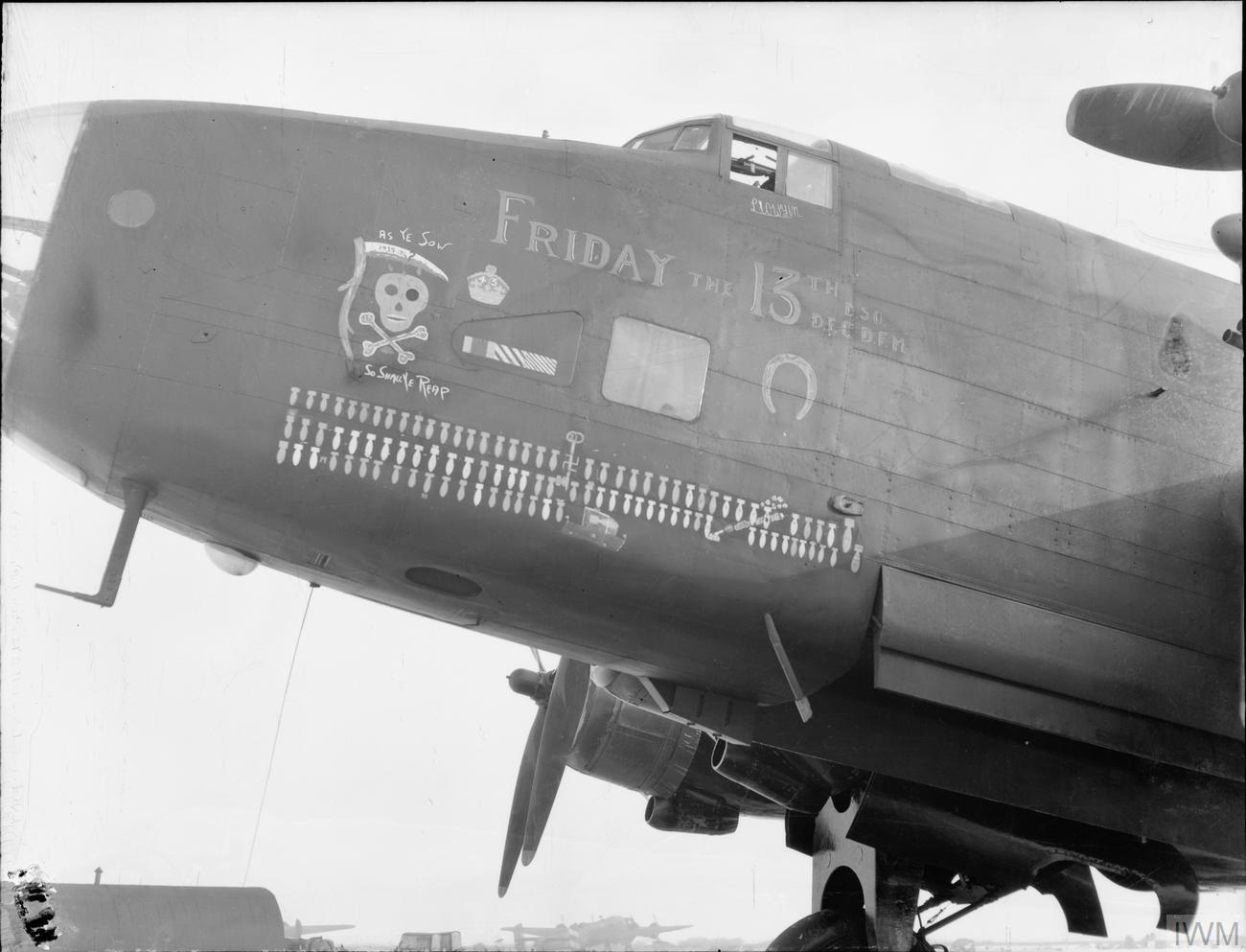
158 Squadron Halifax "Friday the 13th" at RAF Lissett

The squadron reformed at RAF Driffield on 14 February 1942, via the renumbering of No. 104 Squadron, which was equipped with the Vickers Wellington medium bomber, and 158 sqn used these on night raids to Germany and occupied France. In June 1942 the squadron re-equipped with the Halifax B.Mk.II heavy bomber and moved to RAF East Moor. On 6 November 1942 the squadron moved to RAF Rufforth, followed by a move to RAF Lissett on 28 February 1943. In January 1944 the squadron had re-equipped with the Halifax B.Mk.III and 'C' flight was used to form No. 640 Squadron at Leconfield. By 7 May 1945 the Second World War in Europe had finished and No. 158 Squadron was transferred to RAF Transport Command, re-equipping with the Short Stirling Mk.V. The squadron moved to Stradishall on 17 August 1945, where it disbanded on 31 December 1945.

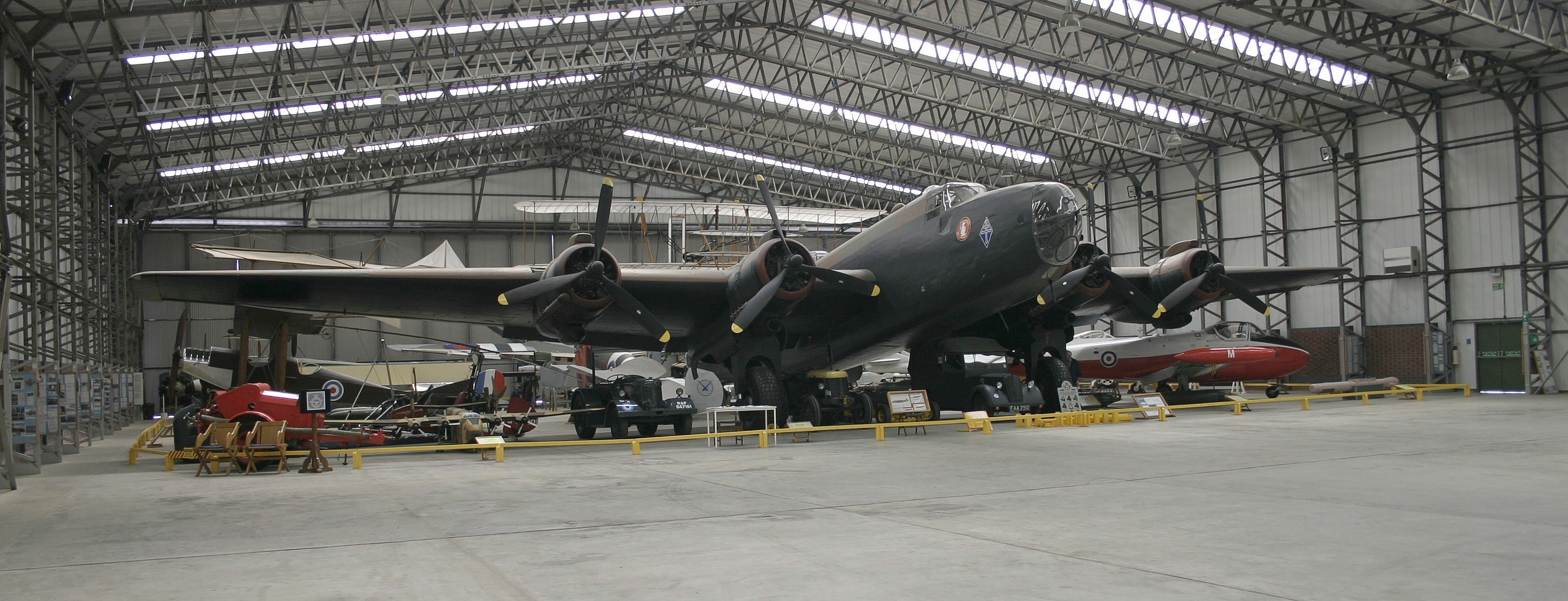
Friday the 13th, Handley Page Halifax II (III) Bomber from the Yorkshire Air Museum, UK

One of the No. 158 Squadron aircraft, a Halifax B.Mk.III, serial no. LV907, coded NP-F and nicknamed "Friday the 13th", completed 128 operational missions and was scrapped after being displayed on Oxford Street in London. A section of the nose from the aircraft was saved and is exhibited at the RAF Museum Hendon. The Halifax that is displayed at the Yorkshire Air Museum is made up of parts of various aircraft and painted as LV907, in honour of the aircraft and its crew. On 11 November 1945 a Stirling C.5 operated by the squadron was departing for the United Kingdom when it crashed on take off from RAF Castel Benito in Libya after the wing caught fire; 21 soldiers and five crew were killed, one person survived.

== Aircraft operated ==
Aircraft operated by no. 158 Squadron RAF, data from
From	To	Aircraft	Version
February 1942	June 1942	Vickers Wellington	Mk.II
June 1942	December 1943	Handley Page Halifax	Mk.II
December 1943	May 1945	Handley Page Halifax	Mk.III
April 1945	May 1945	Handley Page Halifax	Mk.VI
May 1945	December 1945	Short Stirling	Mk.V
November 1945	December 1945	Short Stirling	Mk.IV

== Squadron bases ==
Bases and airfields used by no. 158 Squadron RAF, data from
From	To	Base	Remark
14 February 1942	6 June 1942	RAF Driffield, Yorkshire	Det. at RAF Pocklington, Yorkshire, 14 Feb/5 Mar 1942
6 June 1942	6 November 1942	RAF East Moor, Yorkshire	Det. at RAF Beaulieu, Hampshire for operations with Coastal Command in October 1942
6 November 1942	28 February 1943	RAF Rufforth, Yorkshire	Det. at RAF Manston, Kent for operations with Coastal Command, 7/25 November 1942.
28 February 1943	17 August 1945	RAF Lissett, Yorkshire	
17 August 1945	31 December 1945	RAF Stradishall, Suffolk	

== Commanding officers ==
Officers commanding no. 158 Squadron RAF, data from
From	To	Name	Remark
14 February 1942	7 October 1942	W/Cdr. P. Stevens, DFC	Posted to 10 OTU
7 October 1942	10 March 1943	W/Cdr. C.G.S.R. Robinson, DFC	Posted to 138 Squadron
10 March 1943	10 August 1943	W/Cdr. T.R. Hope, DFC	MIA, 10 August 1943
11 August 1943	7 June 1944	W/Cdr. C.C. Calder, DFC	Posted to 1652 HCU
7 June 1944	7 March 1945	W/Cdr. P. Dobson, DFC, AFC DSO	
7 March 1945	12 June 1945	W/Cdr. G.B. Read, DFC	
12 June 1945	10 July 1945	W/Cdr. F.J. Austin, DFC	
10 July 1945	30 July 1945	S/Ldr. W.H. Whitty	
30 July 1945	31 December 1945	W/Cdr. D. Iveson, DSO, DFC	
