= No. 77 Squadron RAF =

Defunct flying squadron of the Royal Air Force

- Active: 1 October 1916 - 13 June 1919; 14 June 1937 - 1 June 1949; 1 September 1958 – 10 July 1963
- Country: United Kingdom
- Branch: Royal Air Force
- Final base: RAF Feltwell
- Mottos: Latin: Esse potius quam videri ("To be, rather than seem")

Insignia
- Squadron badge heraldry: A thistle. The thistle commemorates the fact that the squadron was formed in Scotland.

No. 77 Squadron RAF was a squadron of the Royal Air Force which was active in various incarnations between 1916 and 1963.

== History ==
=== First World War - Home defence ===
No. 77 Squadron Royal Flying Corps (RFC) was formed on 1 October 1916 at Edinburgh, from a nucleus of personnel from 51 Squadron. It was a Home Defence fighter squadron equipped with B.E.2 and B.E.12 aircraft, and with several detachments on the south-east coast of Scotland. In February 1917, with the threat from German Zeppelin attacks considered to be contained, and an urgent need for night flying qualified pilots to man night bomber squadrons to operate over the Western Front, consideration was given to disbanding 75 and 77 Squadrons, but instead, pilots were detached from several home defence squadrons to form the new 100 Squadron. While the squadron remained operational, it was badly understrength - on 7 March 1917, it had five aircraft, and eight pilots, compared with an establishment strength of eighteen of each. On 1 April 1917 the squadron concentrated its aircraft at Turnhouse (now Edinburgh Airport). On 28 August 1917, in a re-organisation of the RFC's Home Defence forces, three wings were formed, with 77 Squadron becoming part of the Northern Wing. On 1 April 1918, the Royal Flying Corps, and Royal Naval Air Service combined to form the Royal Air Force (RAF). The RAF squadrons retained their existing number, with 77 Squadron becoming No. 77 Squadron Royal Air Force. During April 1918, (Note: May according to Jefford.) the squadron moved to Penston, east of Edinburgh. The squadron disbanded on 13 June 1919.

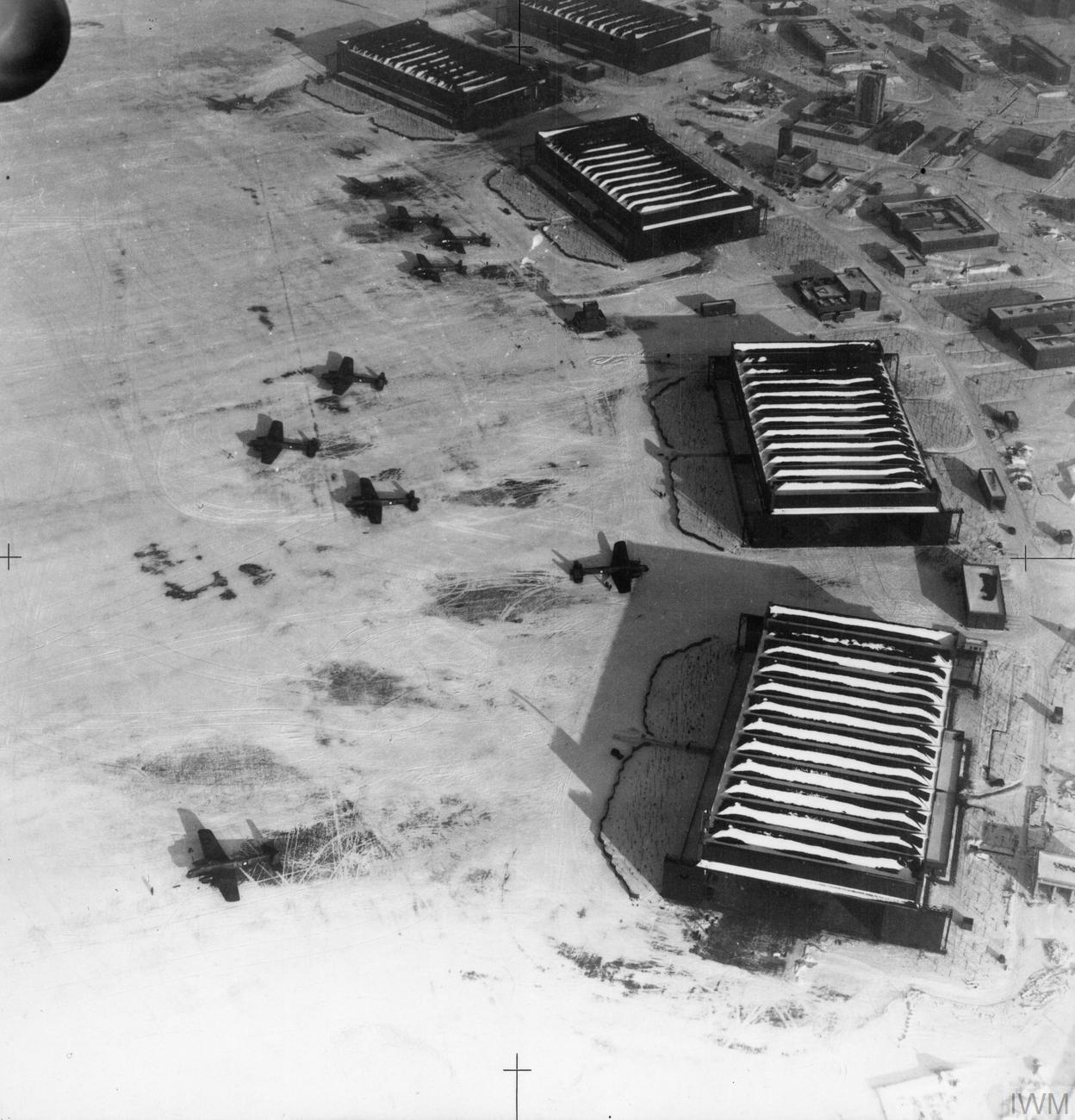
Hangars at RAF Driffield with Whitleys of 77 Squadron in front

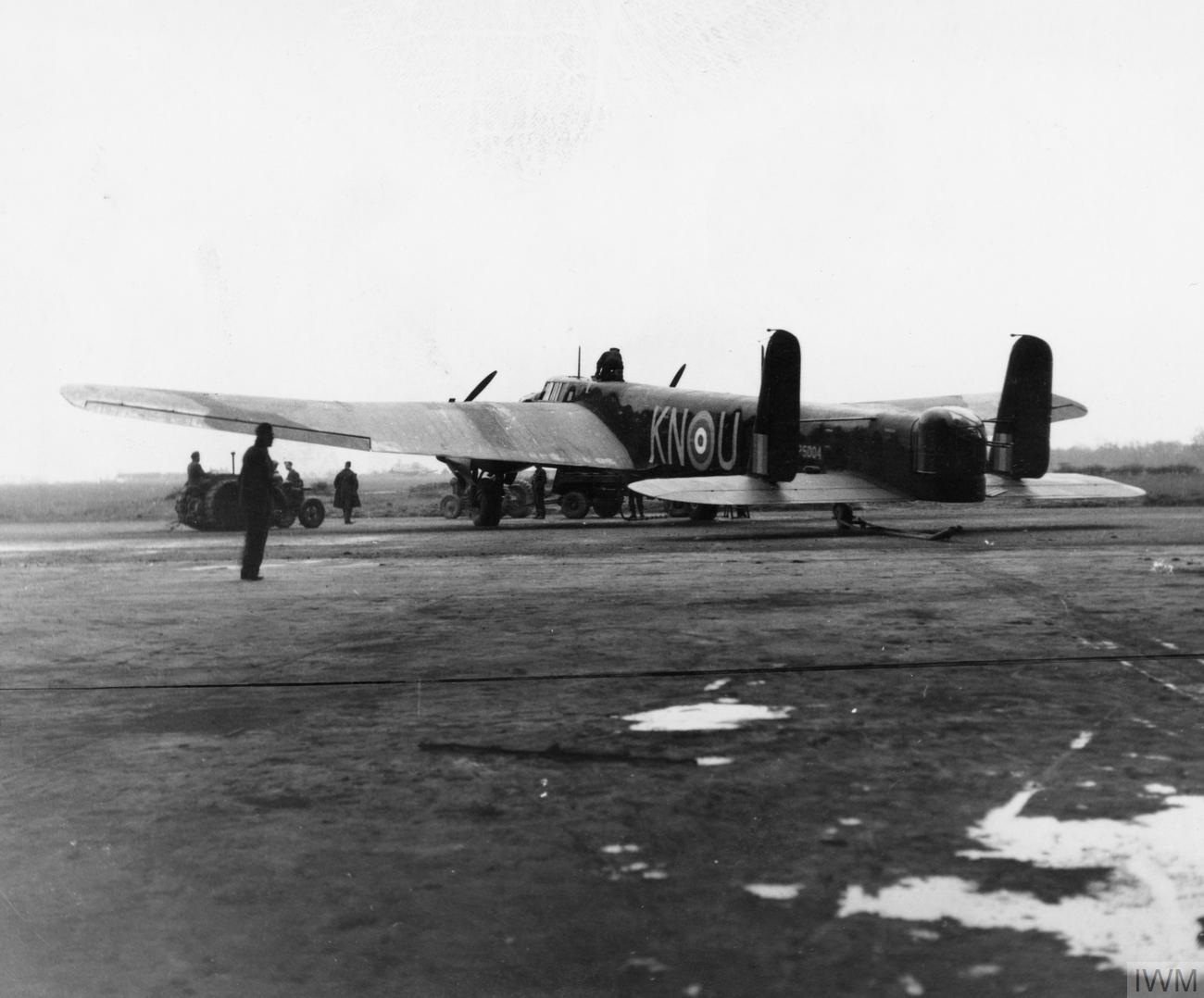
Whitley bomber, 77 Squadron, RAF Topcliffe, November 1940

=== Bomber squadron ===
No. 77 Squadron was reformed on 14 June 1937, at RAF Finningley from 'B' Flight of No. 102 Squadron, equipped with the Hawker Audax. It moved to RAF Honington on 7 July 1937. In November 1937, it re-equipped with the Vickers Wellesley. On 25 July 1938 the squadron moved to RAF Driffield, to form part of No. 4 Group. It re-equipped with Armstrong Whitworth Whitley IIIs in November 1938.

Following the outbreak of the Second World War in September 1939, 4 Group's squadrons, whose crews were the only major force in RAF Bomber Command that was experienced in night flying, were employed in leaflet dropping over Germany. 77 Squadron's first operational mission was on the night of 5/6 September 1939, when two Whitleys were sent to drop leaflets over the Ruhr. The squadron converted to Rolls-Royce Merlin-powered Whitley Vs in September–October 1939. Leaflet dropping operations followed throughout the winter of 1939/40, with targets as distant as Vienna and (in March 1940) German-occupied Warsaw. March 1940 brought more aggressive operations, with the squadron taking part on a raid on a seaplane base at Hörnum on the island of Sylt on the night of 19/20 March. The German invasion of Norway in April 1940 saw part of the squadron detached to RAF Kinloss in Scotland, flying missions against German-held airfields in Southern Norway.

The squadron joined Coastal Command in May 1942 and was engaged in anti-submarine patrols, based at RAF Chivenor.

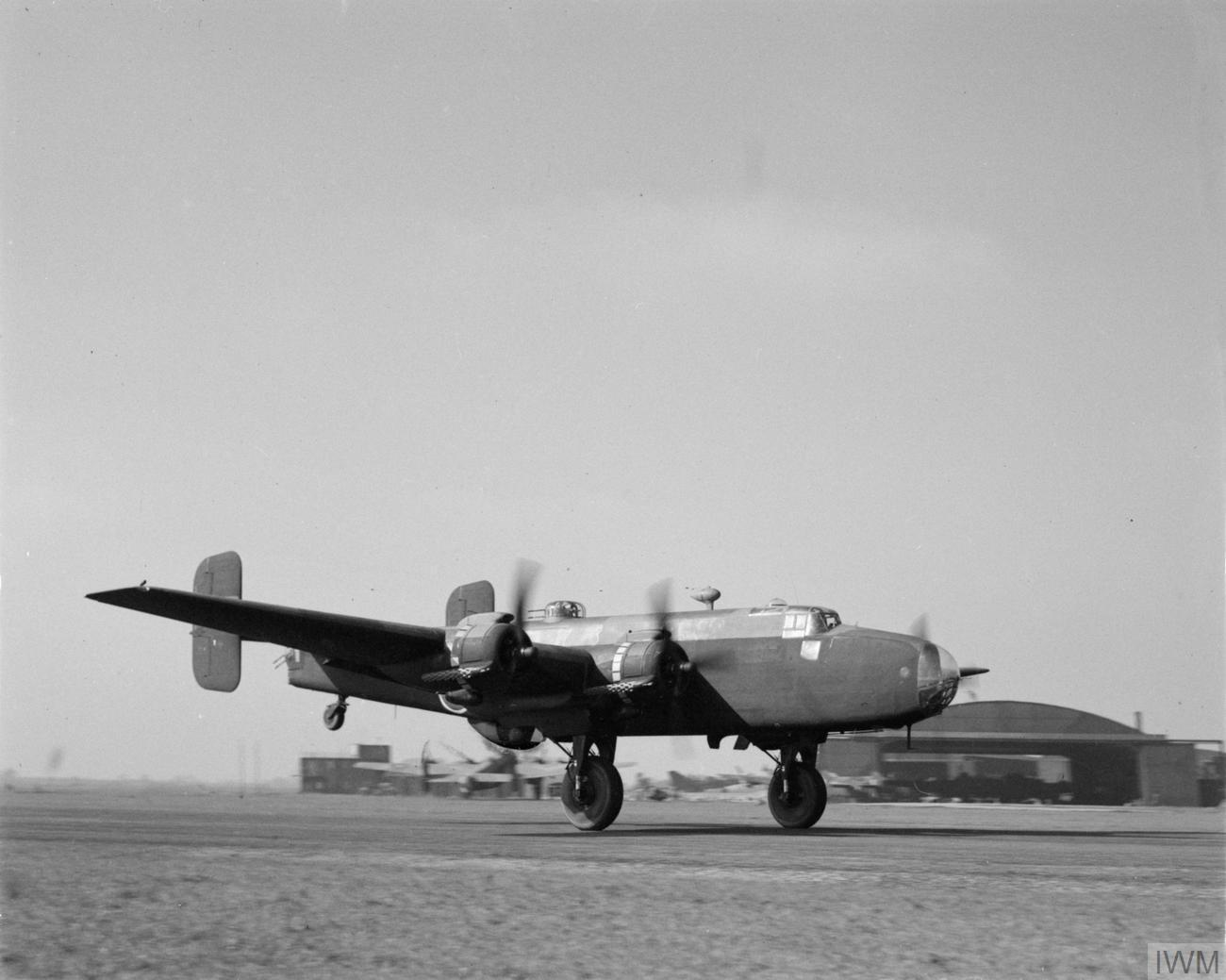
Handley Page HP.57 Halifax B.III, 77 Squadron, RAF Elvington

In October 1942, No. 77 Squadron converted to Halifaxes at RAF Elvington, moving to RAF Full Sutton in May 1944. On 8 May 1945 the squadron joined Transport Command, and in July 1945 re-equipped with Douglas Dakotas. The squadron moved to RAF Broadwell in August 1945 followed by a posting to India in October 1945. The squadron was disbanded by being renumbered as No. 31 Squadron on 1 November 1946.

No. 77 Squadron was reformed at Broadwell in December 1946 when No. 271 Squadron was re-numbered. The squadron operated Dakotas during the Berlin Airlift and then disbanded on 1 June 1949 at RAF Waterbeach.

== Strategic missiles ==
The squadron was again reformed as 77(SM) Sqn. - on 1 September 1958 as one of 20 Strategic Missile (SM) squadrons associated with Project Emily. The squadron was equipped with three PGM-17 Thor Intermediate range ballistic missiles, and based at RAF Feltwell.

In October 1962, during the Cuban Missile Crisis, the squadron was kept at full readiness, with the missiles aimed at strategic targets in the USSR. The squadron was disbanded on 10 July 1963 with the termination of the Thor Program in Britain.

== Aircraft operated ==
- 1916-1918 Royal Aircraft Factory BE2c
- 1916-1918 Royal Aircraft Factory BE12
- 1916 Airco DH.6
- 1916 Royal Aircraft Factory BE2d
- 1917-1918 Royal Aircraft Factory BE2e
- 1917-1918 Royal Aircraft Factory RE8
- 1917-1918 Royal Aircraft Factory BE12b
- 1918-1919 Avro 504K (NF)
- 1937 Hawker Audax
- 1937-1938 Vickers Wellesley
- 1938-1939 Armstrong Whitworth Whitley III
- 1939-1942 Armstrong Whitworth Whitley V
- 1942-1945 Handley Page Halifax II, III, VI and V
- 1945-1946 Douglas Dakota
- 1946-1949 Douglas Dakota
- 1958-1963 PGM-17 Thor IRBM

== Squadron Codes ==
- November 1938 – September 1939; ZL
- September 1939 – November 1946; KN
- 1943 – May 1945; TB ('C' flight)
- December 1946 – June 1949; YS (inherited from No. 271 Squadron)

== See also ==
- List of Thor missile bases
