= RAF Elvington =

Royal Air Force base in Yorkshire, England

RAF Elvington
- Elvington, North Yorkshire in England
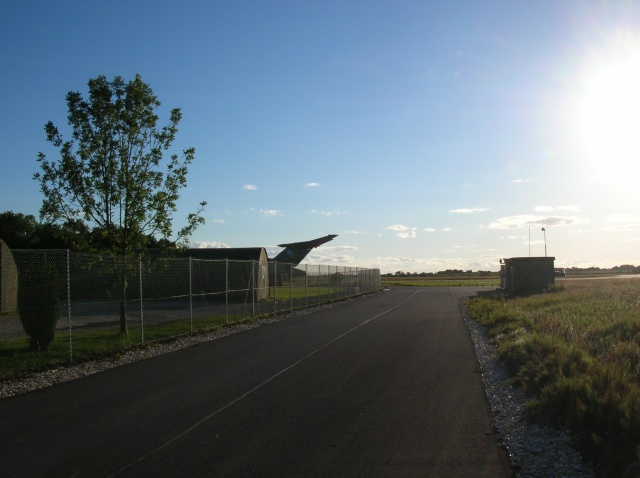
- Elvington airfield

Site information
- Type: Royal Air Force satellite station 1942-43; 42 Base substation 1943
- Code: EV
- Owner: Ministry of Defence
- Operator: Royal Air Force; United States Air Force
- Controlled by: RAF Bomber Command * No. 4 Group RAF

Location
- Shown within North Yorkshire RAF Elvington (the United Kingdom)
- Coordinates: 53°55′28″N 000°58′16″W

Site history
- Built: 1939
- In use: October 1942 - 1992
- Battles/wars: European theatre of World War II; Cold War

Airfield information
- Elevation: 13 metres (43 ft) AMSL
Runways
Direction	Length and surface
08/26	3,000 metres (9,843 ft) Tarmac

Royal Air Force Elvington or more simply RAF Elvington is a former Royal Air Force satellite station which operated from the beginning of the Second World War until 1992 located at Elvington, Yorkshire, England. It is now the location of the Yorkshire Air Museum.

== History ==
=== Royal Air Force use ===
The station was originally a grass airfield within No. 4 Group RAF. In the early 1940s the airfield was entirely reconstructed with three hardened runways replacing the grass. It re-opened in October 1942 as a station for 77 Squadron RAF and along with RAF Melbourne and RAF Pocklington was known as "No. 42 Base". The squadron had a strength of approximately 20 aircraft and initially used the twin engined Armstrong Whitworth Whitley medium bomber although this was quickly replaced by the Handley Page Halifax four engined heavy bomber which was being introduced. No. 77 Squadron suffered heavy losses during its time at Elvington with over 500 aircrew killed, missing or taken prisoner and almost 80 Halifaxes lost as it played a major part in the Battle of the Ruhr and the bombing of Berlin.

In May 1944 No. 77 Squadron posted to the newly opened nearby RAF Full Sutton and was replaced at Elvington by two French squadrons, numbers 346 "Guyenne" and 347 "Tunisie" who both played a leading part in the bombing of Germany. Elvington was the only airfield in the United Kingdom used by the remainder of the Free French Forces, they also flew Handley Page Halifax heavy bombers until they moved to Bordeaux in October 1945 where they became the basis for the new air force of liberated France. In September 1957 a memorial was unveiled in Elvington village dedicated to the two French squadrons. While they were at RAF Elvington nearly half of the squadrons' members were killed.

After the war the 400-acre (1.6 km^{2}) airfield was transferred to No. 40 Group RAF under the control of RAF Maintenance Command until 1952 when it was greatly enlarged and extended for use by the United States Air Force.

=== United States Air Force use ===
The United States Air Force (USAF) built a new 3,094 m (10,151 ft) runway, which was the longest in the north of England, and a 19.8 hectares (49 acres) rectangular hardstanding apron as well as a new control tower to turn Elvington into a "Basic Operation Platform" which would have operated as a Strategic Air Command (SAC) dispersal airfield. After spending £4 million the airfield never became operational as a SAC base and was abandoned by the US Air Force in 1958.

=== Other uses ===
In the early 1960s the Blackburn Aircraft Company, now part of British Aerospace used the runway for test flights of the Blackburn Buccaneer. Elvington retained its status as an RAF relief landing ground and was used by the RAF flying training schools at RAF Church Fenton and RAF Linton-on-Ouse until the airfield was finally closed in March 1992.

=== Units ===
The following units were also here at some point:

- Relief landing ground for No. 1 Flying Training School RAF (30 November 1966 - 10 October 1968)
- No. 4 Group Communication Flight RAF (18 June - 10 November 1943)
- Relief landing ground for No. 7 (Basic) Flying Training School RAF (1 June 1962 - 30 November 1966)
- Relief landing ground for No. 7 Flying Training School RAF
- Relief landing ground for No. 14 (Advanced) Flying Training School RAF (12 May 1952 - 31 January 1953)
- Sub site of No. 14 Maintenance Unit RAF (31 January - 18 November 1946)

== Motorsport ==
Elvington
- Location: Yorkshire, England
- Opened: 1962
- Closed: 1963 (cars only)

A race circuit was established which appears to have been used by the British Racing and Sports Car Club (BRSCC). The inaugural car race meeting took place on 8 July 1962 and was reported by Autosport, which said that the BRSCC hoped to run a further meeting September, but this appears not to have taken place. A second meeting did take place a year after on 7 July 1963, but these two appear to have been the sum total of car racing at Elvington.

However, in June 1970 Auto 66 Club held a Motorcycle Road Race meeting at Elvington, with a second meeting in September. The following season these were upgraded to National Status events. Although local critics thought the club had gone well over the top, the National event attracted over 400 riders, including stars of the future like Mick Grant and Barry Sheene. The Auto 66 Club continued to organise meetings at this track.

== Record breaking ==
In October 1969, when preparing for a challenge at the Monza high-speed banked-oval circuit to a record held by Moto Guzzi, Ray Pickrell practiced by riding a Dunstall Norton road-going motorcycle during a regular sprint meeting. He set a new national record for the 750 cc class flying quarter mile at 144.69 mph (232.86 km/h).

On 3 October 1970 Tony Densham, driving the Ford-powered "Commuter" dragster, set the Official outright wheel driven record at Elvington by averaging 207.6 mph (334.1 km/h) over the flying kilometre course. This broke Malcolm Campbell's record set 43 years previously at Pendine Sands.

In 1990 Elvington hosted an attempt to match the speed record run of the Sunbeam Tiger motor car, originally driven by Henry Segrave (on 21 March 1926, he set his first land speed record in his 4-litre Sunbeam Tiger Ladybird on the sands at Southport, England at 152.33 mph). The re-run at Elvington on the two mile (3 km) runway was recorded at 159 mph (256 km/h).

In the summer of 1998 Colin Fallows bettered Richard Noble's outright UK Record, driving his "Vampire" jet dragster at Elvington with an average of 269 mph (433 km/h). The current non wheel-driven British Land Speed Record holder is Vampire, driven by Fallows, which hit a speed of 300.3 mph (483.3 km/h) on 5 July 2000 at Elvington.

On 20 September 2006 Elvington Airfield was the location of a serious crash involving the Top Gear presenter Richard Hammond and "Vampire". The jet-powered car he was driving crashed while travelling at 280 mph (450 km/h). Hammond suffered serious brain injuries, but made a full recovery. The accident investigation said: "an almost instantaneous blow out of the right side front tyre caused the accident."

Lord Drayson set a new lightweight electric land speed record of 204.2 mph (328.6 km/h) in a Lola B12-based vehicle at Elvington in 2013, breaking the previous record that had stood since 1974.

World records for the fastest Wheelie bin at 43 miles per hour (69 km/h), and the fastest electric wheelchair at 66 miles per hour (106 km/h) were set in 2020.

Zef Eisenberg of MADMAX Race team, who holds numerous land speed records, crashed his 560 hp Rolls-Royce Turbine powered motorbike at Elvington airfield on 18 September 2016, during a two way speed record attempt. It was reported that he did not see the finish line, causing him to leave the end of the runway and crash at a speed of around 230 mph. He sustained 11 broken bones and was hospitalised for three months. It was believed to be Britain's fastest motorbike crash survivor. After rebuilding his Turbine powered bike and making a recovery that surprised the doctors, he was racing again on the anniversary of the crash at the same track and on the same (rebuilt) bike. On the afternoon of 1 October 2020, Eisenberg died in a collision whilst attempting to set a British land speed record.

In 2019 Guy Martin set a new speed record for driving a tractor at the site. In a series of runs in a JCB Fastrac Two he averaged 135.191 miles per hour (217.569 km/h) and reached a peak speed of 155.77 miles per hour (250.69 km/h).

In 2023 Professional Skateboarder and presenter Ryan Swain announced he was to attempt a Guinness World Records in skateboarding at Elvington on 8 May 2023 in aid of Mind mental health charity. He will be attempting to skateboard over 300 miles in less than 24 hours and will be the first GB Skateboarder to hold the record if completed.

On 25 May 2023, engineer Allen Millyard together with television presenter Henry Cole set a world motorcycle speed-record, ratified by Guinness World Records at 183.50 mph (295.31 km/h), achieved with the pair riding "tandem" on the one-off, road-legal hand-made Millyard Viper, beating by two mph the previous record held by an American couple for over 10 years.

== Present day ==
The airfield is now owned by Elvington Park Ltd. The adjacent buildings and control tower have been restored, and serve as the Yorkshire Air Museum which has many varied and rare aircraft and exhibits, including a complete Halifax bomber. Elvington is also a popular motorsports venue for motorcycle racing.
