= No. 466 Squadron RAAF =

Royal Australian Air Force squadron

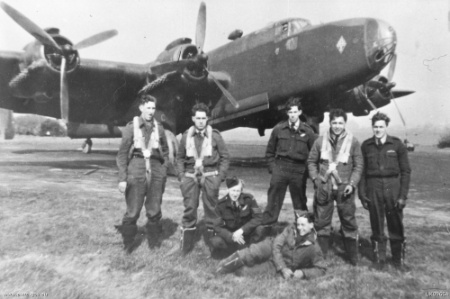
- A No. 466 Squadron Halifax B.III with its crew after their return from a raid on Germany in January 1944
- Active: 15 October 1942 – 26 October 1945
- Country: Australia
- Branch: Royal Australian Air Force
- Type: Inactive
- Role: Bomber squadron
- Part of: No. 4 Group RAF, Bomber Command (Oct 42 – May 45); No. 4 Group RAF, Transport Command (May 45 – Oct 45)
- Mottos: "Brave and true"
- Battle honours: Fortress Europe, 1940–1944; France and Germany, 1944–1945; Ruhr, 1940–1945; Berlin, 1940–1945; German Ports, 1940–1945; Normandy, 1944; Walcheren

Commanders
- Commanding Officers: Reginald Edward Bailey; Dudley Thomas Forsyth; Hamilton Wesley Connolly; Alan Wharton; Albert Hollings

Insignia
- Squadron codes: HD (Oct 1942 – Oct 1945)
- Tail markings: Three horizontal yellow stripes

Aircraft flown
- Bomber: Vickers Wellington; Handley Page Halifax
- Transport: Handley Page Halifax; Consolidated Liberator

No. 466 Squadron RAAF was a Royal Australian Air Force (RAAF) bomber squadron during World War II. Formed in the United Kingdom in late 1942, the squadron undertook combat operations in Europe until the end of the war, flying heavy bomber aircraft. Following the conclusion of hostilities with Germany, the squadron began retraining to undertake operations in the Pacific against the Japanese, but the war came to an end before it left the UK. In late 1945, the squadron was disbanded.

== History ==
No. 466 Squadron was formed at RAF Driffield in Yorkshire, England, on 10 October 1942, under Article XV of the Empire Air Training Scheme. The majority of its original personnel were from British Commonwealth air forces other than the RAAF. Their replacement by Australians was a gradual process and it was only towards the end of the war that the squadron's personnel were predominantly members of the RAAF.

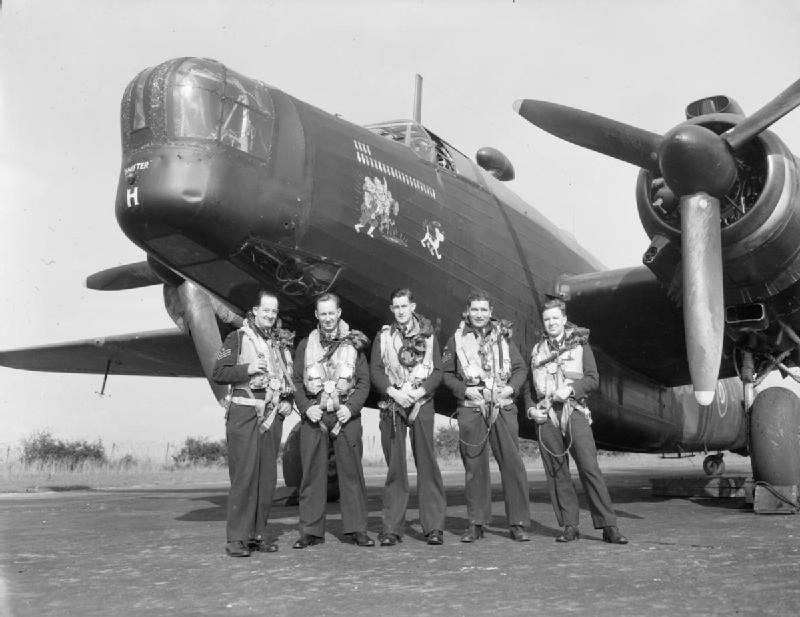
The first all-Australian Bomber Command crew to complete a tour of duty in the war, a 466 Squadron Wellington crew at RAF Leconfield, 1943

After the squadron had been equipped with Vickers Wellington medium bombers, it transferred to RAF Leconfield, also in Yorkshire, on 27 December 1942 and flew its first mission on 13 January 1943. Its main roles were strategic bombing over Germany and laying naval mines in the North Sea. The squadron had its first direct encounter with the Luftwaffe on 14 February 1943 when, during a raid on Cologne, a Wellington Mk.X, serial number HE506, identification "HD-N", opened fire on a Junkers Ju 88 night fighter, while it was over either Turnhout Belgium, or the Dutch island of Tholen (sources differ). The crew reported seeing a brilliant flash after the rear gunner, Sergeant Angus, opened fire on it and the Junkers was claimed as probably destroyed.

Following a mission on 14 April 1943, four members of the crew of a No. 466 Sqn Wellington Mk.X, HZ256, "HD-L", commanded by Sergeant Edward Hicks (Auxiliary Air Force) received medals . A Distinguished Service Order (DSO) was awarded to Pilot Officer Raymond Hopkins (RAFVR), a Distinguished Flying Cross (DFC) went to Flying Officer Reginald Clayton (RAFVR), a Distinguished Flying Medal (DFM) to Sergeant Frederick Blair (RAF) and a Conspicuous Gallantry Medal (CGM) to Hicks. According to the RAAF Museum, the award of so many decorations to a single crew was "highly unusual". The awards were gazetted on 14 May 1943, with a joint citation (see below). Following subsequent operations, Hicks received further decorations and acclaim.

No. 466 Sqn converted to the Handley Page Halifax heavy bomber in late 1943. In June 1944, the squadron returned to Driffield. From May 1944, operations were focussed on German infrastructure in France, such as coastal artillery batteries and railway marshalling yards, in preparation for the invasion of Europe.

Flying Officer Joe Herman (RAAF), the captain of a No. 466 Sqn Halifax B.Mk.III, narrowly escaped death in a remarkable incident on 4 November 1944. During a night mission over Germany, his aircraft (LV936, "HD-D"), was badly damaged by Flak. After ordering the crew to bail out, Herman was blown out of the plane, without a parachute. After falling a long way, possibly more than 3,000 metres, Herman fell onto the Halifax's mid-upper gunner, F/O John Vivash (RAAF), and grabbed one of his legs. Both men descended on one parachute, suffered minor injuries when landing and survived the war as prisoners of war. From a total crew of seven, only one other airman, Sgt H. W. Knott (RAF), survived. According to one source, at least three crew members were murdered after being captured.

In May 1945, following the end of the war in Europe, the squadron dumped surplus bombs into the sea and began re-training at RAF Bassingbourn, in Cambridgeshire, as a transport unit. Some sources state that the squadron was renumbered as No. 10 Squadron RAAF on 20 June 1945, while others say the squadron operated as a combined unit with No. 10 Sqn. It was re-converting to Consolidated Liberator heavy bombers when Japan surrendered, whereupon the squadron was disbanded at RAF Bassingbourn on 26 October 1945.

No. 466 Squadron flew 3,326 sorties against 269 different targets, dropping 8,804 tons of bombs and laying 442 tons of mines. A total of 81 aircraft were lost and 184 RAAF personnel serving with the squadron were killed.

Joint Citation, 14 May 1943

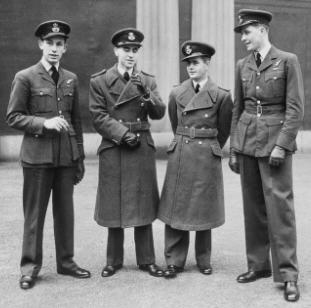
London, November 1943. The all-British/RAF crew of 466 Sqn Wellington "HD-L" at Buckingham Palace, about to receive medals resulting from their mission on 14 April: Flying Officer Raymond Hopkins DSO of Newport, Wales (left); Pilot Officer Frederick Blair DFM of Belfast, Pilot Officer Edward Hicks CGM of Newbury Park, Essex and Flying Officer Reginald Clayton DFC of Carshalton, Surrey.

Pilot Officer Hopkins, Flying Officer Clayton and Sergeants Hicks and Blair were air bomber [bomb aimer], navigator, captain and wireless operator respectively of an aircraft detailed to attack a target in the Ruhr. Over Germany the aircraft was attacked by an enemy [night] fighter. The first burst of fire from the attacker fatally injured the rear gunner [Sgt R. F. Field, RAF] and wounded the air bomber, navigator and wireless operator. The fighter made a second attack but Sergeant Hicks avoided its gunfire by turning steeply under the enemy aircraft which was not seen again. Although the hydraulic and brake systems ... were damaged, causing the wheels to drop down and the bomb doors to open, the crew decided to continue their mission. Pilot Officer Hopkins ... although suffering from a compound fracture of the arm and ... retaining consciousness with great difficulty, displayed unsurpassed determination by directing his pilot to the target and bombing it successfully. On the return flight, Pilot Officer Hopkins, Flying Officer Clayton and Sergeant Blair laboured for more than 2 hours to assist the mortally wounded rear gunner, extricating him from his turret and administering morphia; some of their efforts were made whilst flying at 15,000 feet and without oxygen. Sergeant Hicks eventually flew the damaged aircraft to an airfield in this country, where he effected a landing without the aid of flaps.

— London Gazette, 11 May 1943.

== Aircraft operated ==
Aircraft operated by no. 466 Squadron RAAF, data from
From	To	Aircraft	Version
October 1942	December 1942	Vickers Wellington	Mk.III
November 1942	September 1943	Vickers Wellington	Mk.X
September 1943	November 1943	Handley Page Halifax	Mk.II
November 1943	May 1945	Handley Page Halifax	Mk.III
May 1945	October 1945	Handley Page Halifax	Mk.VI
October 1945	October 1945	Consolidated Liberator	MK. VIII

== Squadron bases ==
Bases and airfields used by no. 466 Squadron RAAF, data from
From	To	Base
15 October 1942	27 December 1942	RAF Driffield, Yorkshire
27 December 1942	3 June 1944	RAF Leconfield, Yorkshire
3 June 1944	8 September 1945	RAF Driffield, Yorkshire
8 September 1945	26 October 1945	RAF Bassingbourn, Cambridgeshire

== Commanding officers ==
Officers commanding no. 466 Squadron RAAF, data from
From	To	Name
10 October 1942	29 September 1943	Wing Commander R.E. Bailey
29 September 1943	23 May 1944	Wing Commander D.T. Forsyth
23 May 1944	20 October 1944	Wing Commander H.W. Connolly
20 October 1944	3 April 1945	Wing Commander A. Wharton
3 April 1945	26 October 1945	Wing Commander A. Hollings
