= RAF Leconfield =

Royal Air Force base in Yorkshire, England

RAF Leconfield
- Leconfield, East Riding of Yorkshire in England
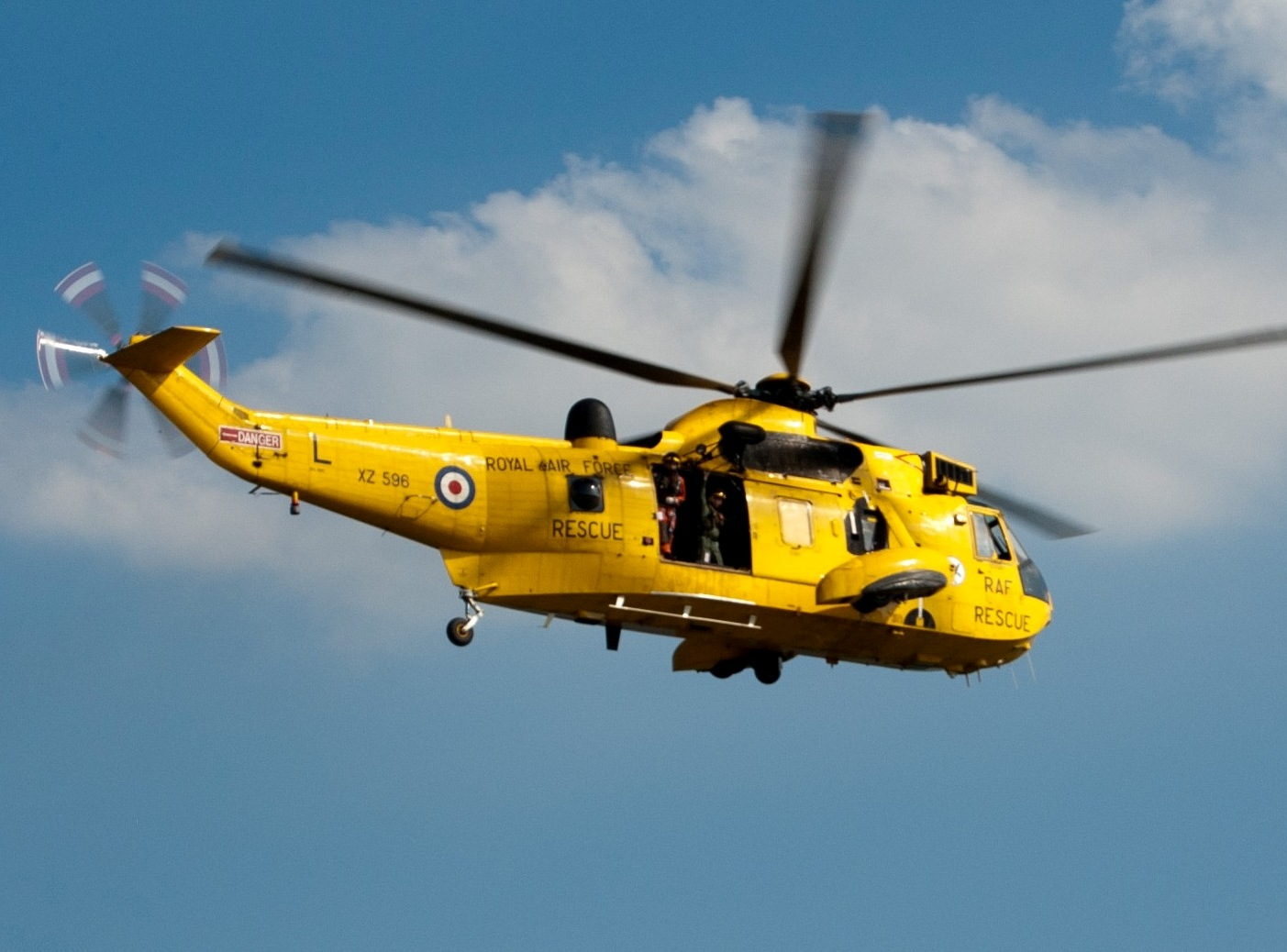
- Sea King HAR3 of No. 202 Squadron (E-Flight) based at RAF Leconfield.

- Extenebris ad lucem (Latin for 'From Darkness to Light')

Site information
- Type: Royal Air Force station
- Code: LC
- Owner: Ministry of Defence
- Operator: Royal Air Force
- Controlled by: RAF Bomber Command; 1936–39 & 1941–45 * No. 4 Group RAF * No. 6 Group RAF; RAF Fighter Command; 1939–41 & 1945-65 * No. 13 Group RAF
- Condition: Closed

Location
- Shown within East Riding of Yorkshire
- Coordinates: 53°52′37″N 000°26′15″W
- Grid reference: TA030435
- Area: 296 hectares

Site history
- Built: 1936 & 1957
- In use: December 1936 – January 1977
- Fate: Transferred to British Army and became the Army School of Mechanical Transport, subsequently the Defence School of Transport.
- Battles/wars: European theatre of World War II; Cold War

Garrison information
- Past commanders: Group Captain John Hemingway

Airfield information
- Identifiers: ICAO: EGXV, WMO: 03382
- Elevation: 8 metres (26 ft) AMSL
Runways
Direction	Length and surface
01/19	1,829 metres (6,001 ft) Concrete
04/22	1,280 metres (4,199 ft) Concrete
14/32	1,280 metres (4,199 ft) Concrete

Royal Air Force Leconfield or more simply RAF Leconfield is a former Royal Air Force station located in Leconfield (near Beverley), East Riding of Yorkshire, England. The site is now used by the MoD Defence School of Transport Leconfield or DST Leconfield.

== History ==
Leconfield opened on 3 December 1936 as part of RAF Bomber Command with Handley Page Heyford bombers from No. 166 Squadron RAF using the airfield from January 1937 until early September 1939.

=== Second World War ===
On the night of 3 September 1939, the first night of the war, ten Whitley bombers from Leconfield became the first British aircraft to penetrate German airspace, dropping propaganda leaflets over Germany. In October 1939 it was taken over by RAF Fighter Command and the Supermarine Spitfire I's of 72 squadron arrived from RAF Church Fenton. During the Battle of Britain, the station was a temporary home to many other squadrons of Fighter Command which made short stays here to rest and re-group. During this period there was also a decoy airfield at nearby Routh.

During the war the RAF squadrons based at Leconfield were:

- No. 51 Squadron between 20 April 1945 and 21 August 1945 with the Short Stirling Mk.V before moving to RAF Stradishall.
- No. 166 Squadron between 20 January 1937 and 17 September 1939 using the Handley Page Heyford III before switching to the Armstrong Whitworth Whitley I in June 1939 and moving to RAF Abingdon.
- No. 196 Squadron between 22 December 1942 and 19 July 1943 flying the Vickers Wellington X before moving to RAF Witchford.
- No. 234 Squadron reformed at Leconfield on 30 October 1939 with the Fairey Battle, Bristol Blenheim IF, Gloster Gauntlet II before settling on the Supermarine Spitfire Mk. I. The squadron moved to RAF Church Fenton on 22 May 1940.
- No. 466 Squadron between 22 December 1942 and 3 June 1944 with the Handley Page Halifax II/III before moving to RAF Driffield.
- No. 610 Squadron between 29 August 1941 and 14 January 1942 with the Supermarine Spitfire IIA/VB before moving to RAF Hutton Cranswick.
- No. 640 Squadron formed at the airfield on 7 January 1944 with the Halifax III before switching to the Mk. VI in March 1945 and disbanding on 7 May 1945.

The station was also the place of formation of the Polish No. 302 Squadron "Poznański", and the place of rest of the Polish No. 303 "Kościuszko" Squadron after it had its turn in the defence of London. One of 303's pilots, Tadeusz Sawicz, was at the time of his death in 2011 believed to be the last surviving Polish pilot to have fought in the Battle of Britain.

=== Post-war ===
In the 1950s Leconfield was a nominated 'dispersal base' for the RAF V bomber force. Also, after being transferred from RAF Catfoss in October 1945, and into the early 1950s, it was home to the Central Gunnery School which, among other functions, trained air gunnery instructors in Wellington bombers and pilot attack instructors in Spitfire and Mosquito aircraft. This school was later transformed into the Fighter Weapons School. The aircraft then flown were mainly single-seat Venoms and Meteors, plus twin-seat Vampire T11, Meteor trainers and Hawker Hunters for trials with ADEN cannons in 1957. Bristol Sycamore HR 14 helicopters of No. 275 Squadron RAF arrived on 9 October 1957; the squadron was then re-equipped with the Westland Whirlwind HAR 4 in March 1959, and also the HAR 2 version in August 1959. On 1 September 1959 the squadron was disbanded.

On 29 June 1959 19 Squadron joined with their Hawker Hunter F.6's. They were re-equipped with the English Electric Lightning F.2 in December 1962, and moved to RAF Gütersloh on 23 September 1965, where they were joined on 24 January 1968 by No. 92 Squadron, the RAF's official aerobatic team, known as the Blue Diamonds, which had also been stationed at Leconfield with their Hunter F.6's and later FGA9s. It then became home to No. 60 Maintenance Unit RAF (MU) and also 202 'B' Flight with Westland Whirlwind helicopters. 60MU was responsible for the major servicing of the EE/BAC Lightnings, plus several other tasks. No. 202 Squadron became the first SAR unit to rescue people off Britain's first offshore oil rig, the Sea Gem, which had capsized on 27 December 1965; the crew of a Whirlwind were awarded medals and commendations for rescuing three men from the freezing water in a horrendous snowstorm.

In the 1970s the control tower at Leconfield developed a reputation for being haunted by a flight lieutenant who had been killed, along with an airman passenger, when a Meteor 7 he was piloting crashed when coming into land in 1956.

Group Captain John "Paddy" Hemingway, a former Commanding Officer of RAF Leconfield and the last surviving RAF pilot of the Battle of Britain, died on 17 March 2025, at the age of 105.

RAF Leconfield closed on 1 January 1977.

RAF Leconfield archive footage from summer 1961 shows Queen Elizabeth The Queen Mother going to tea at the home of Sgt Denys French and family, including his daughter Dawn French, aged 3 years and 9 months. A section of the footage was included in French's comedy tour/video Thirty Million Minutes.

== Units ==
The following units were here at some point:

- 'G' Flight of No. 1 Anti-Aircraft Co-operation Unit RAF
- No. 1 Fighter Command Modification Centre RAF
- No. 11 (Fighter) Group RAF
- No. 11 Group Communication Flight RAF (??–1963)
- No. 11 Group Modification Centre RAF
- No. 11 (Northern) Sector RAF
- No. 15 Service Flying Training School RAF (??–1942) became No. 15 (Pilots) Advanced Flying Unit RAF (1942–??)
- No. 25 Gliding School RAF (??–1947)
- No. 28 Conversion Flight RAF (1941–??)
- No. 60 Maintenance Unit RAF
- No. 60 Operational Training Unit RAF
- No. 107 Conversion Flight RAF (1941–42)
- No. 151 (Fighter) Wing RAF
- No. 1484 (Bomber) Gunnery Flight RAF (??–1944)
- No. 1502 (Beam Approach Training) Flight RAF (??–1943)
- No. 1520 (Beam Approach Training) Flight RAF
- Central Gunnery School RAF (??–1954) became the Coastal Command Gunnery School RAF (1955)
- Fighter Weapons School RAF (1955–??)
- Home Command Major Servicing Unit RAF
- Special Installation Squadron RAF
- Yorkshire Universities Air Squadron

== Current role ==
Leconfield is now home to the Defence School of Transport (DST Leconfield) and is one of the Schools that make up the Defence College of Logistics Policing and Administration (DCLPA) it is a Tri-Service establishment. DST Leconfield is Europe's largest driver training establishment, the accommodation is designated as Normandy Barracks.

Although flying operations were not the main role of Leconfield, two Sea King helicopters of 'E' Flight, 202 Sqn were based here in the Search and Rescue role however this changed as a private company took over the services and the aircraft were retired. Flying operations ceased on 1 April 2015 with the departure of the two Sea King helicopters. The Search and rescue function has been assumed by the Maritime and Coastguard agency based at Humberside Airport.
