= No. 640 Squadron RAF =

- Active: 7 January 1944 – 7 May 1945
- Country: United Kingdom
- Branch: Royal Air Force
- Role: Bomber Squadron
- Part of: No. 4 Group, RAF Bomber Command
- Base: RAF Leconfield, East Riding of Yorkshire

Insignia
- Squadron Codes: C8 (Jan 1944 – May 1945)

Aircraft flown
- Bomber: Handley-Page Halifax

No. 640 Squadron RAF was a heavy bomber squadron of the Royal Air Force during the Second World War.

== History ==
No. 640 Squadron was first formed at RAF Leconfield, East Riding of Yorkshire on 7 January 1944, from 'C' Flight of No. 158 Squadron RAF. It was equipped with Halifax Mk.III bombers, and operated as part of No. 4 Group in Bomber Command. It re-equipped with Halifax VI bombers in March 1945, and was disbanded at RAF Leconfield on 7 May of that year.

=== Operational highlights ===
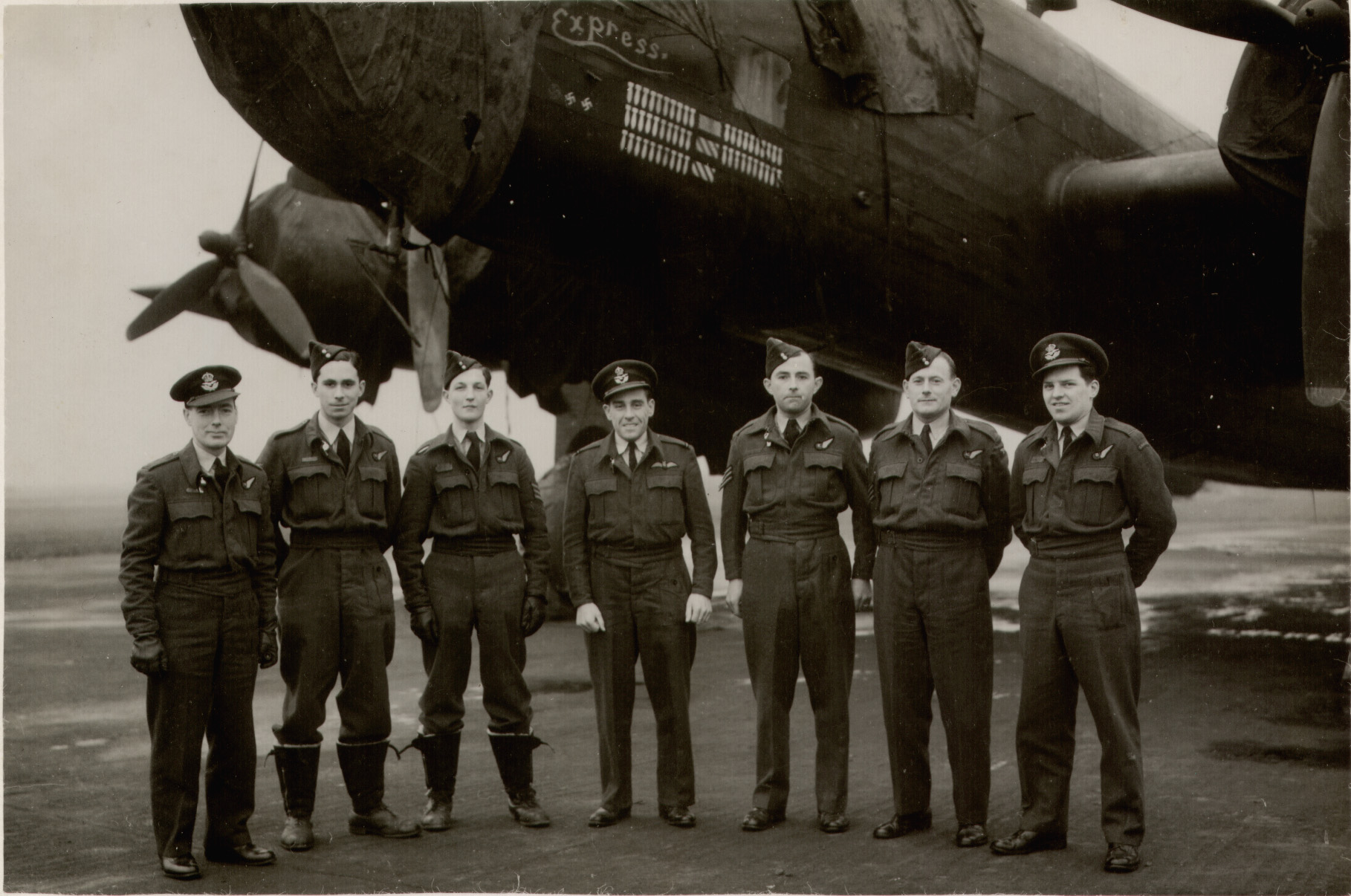
A crew from No. 640 Squadron at Leconfield taken in December 1944, with a Halifax III in the background. Photograph features: Captain F/O R.Wakeman, DFC; Navigator P/O Reginald William Parr, DFC; Bomb Aimer F/O C.B.Morrison, RCAF, DFC; W/Op. F/Sgt H. Bearyman; Flt.Eng F/Sgt P/McPhie; Mid-upper Gunner F/S R.Thomas; Rear Gunner F/Sgt E.G. Humphries.

- First Operational Mission 5 Halifaxes bombed Berlin while 3 others aborted on the night from 20 to 21 January 1944
- Last Operational Mission 18 Halifaxes bombed gun batteries on the island of Wangerooge on 25 April 1945

Listed below are further operational highlights for the Wakeman crew (see photograph right)
Position	Name crew member	Known as
Captain	F/O R.Wakeman, DFC	Jimmy
Navigator	P/O Reginald William Parr, DFC	Reg
Bomb Aimer	F/O C.B.Morrison, RCAF, DFC	Cliff
W/Op	F/Sgt. H.Bearyman	Harry
Flt.Eng.	F/Sgt. P.McPhie	Peter
Mid-upper Gunner	F/S R.Thomas	Tommy
Rear Gunner	F/Sgt. E.G.Humphries	Eric

Individual missions for the above named crew, data from
Date (all dates are in 1944)	Off	Back	Target	Mission Detail	Bomb Load (lbs)	Individual Aircraft Code	Aircraft Serial No.
6 August	11:12	14:27	Forêt de Nieppe	V-Weapon Sites.	16×500	X	
7 August	20:53	01:48	May-sur-Orne	Army Support – Five aiming points in front of Allied ground troops in Normandy.	9×1000	H	NA573
9 August	11:53	15:28	Le Châtellier	Chemical works.	4×500	X	
10 August	20:50	03:50	Dijon	A railway junction and the railway yards.	4×500	J	
11 August	18:22	22:07	Étaples	Railway bridge.	4×500	Z	
15 August	09:40	13:45	Eindhoven	Airfield	4×500	B	MZ561
16 August	21:40	01:45	Kiel		4×500	B	MZ561
18 August	22:20	03:00	Sterkrade/Holten, Ruhr.	Ruhrchemie AG synthetic oil plant (SBC = small bomb container)	1×2000, 4×SBC	B	MZ561
9 September	06:44	11:09	Le Havre	Abandoned – cloud.	16×500	G	
11 September	05:19	09:49	Cadillac		7×1000, 6×500	K	
12 September	16:15	20:50	Münster		1×2000 & Incendiary	P	MZ678
17 September	06:52	10:43	Boulogne	German positions in preparation for an attack by Allied troops.	9×1000, 4×500	J	NP631
25 September	06:35	10:36	Calais	German defensive positions.	9×1000, 4×500	J	NP931
27 September	09:29	13:03	Calais	German defensive positions.	9×1000, 4×500	D	LW554
30 September	09:45	14:22	Bottrop, Ruhr.	Oil plant.	16×500	H	MZ344
6 October	14:28	19:04	Sterkrade/Holten, Ruhr.	Ruhrchemie AG Synthetic oil plant.	16×500	J	NP931
7 October	11:45	16:03	Kleve	Army support – Approach routes by which German units could threaten the vulnerable Allied right flank near Nijmegen.	9×1000, 4×500	J	NP931
15 October	00:16	05:53	Duisburg		8×1000, 5×500	K	MZ930
15 October	17:48	21:41	Wilhelmshaven		8×1000, 5×500	K	MZ930
25 October	12:09	17:51	Essen	Industrial concerns, particularly to the Krupps steelworks.	9×1000, 4×500	J	NP931
28 October	09:45	13:05	Walcheren	Gun positions at 5 places on the rim of the island.	1×2000, 7×1000, 4×500	L	NP931
31 October	18:03	23:10	Cologne		1×2000, 6×1000, 5×500	G	MZ404
2 November	16:05	22:00	Düsseldorf		1×2000 & Incendiary	J	NP931
4 November	17:34	22:34	Bochum	Industrial areas, particularly the steelworks.	1×2000, 6×1000, 5×500	J	NP931
6 November	11:42	16:42	Gelsenkirchen	Nordstern synthetic-oil plant.	1×2000, 6×1000, 5×500	J	NP931
16 November	12:43	17:30	Jülich	Army support – cut communications behind the German lines.	1×2000, 6×1000, 5×500	J	NP931
21 November	17:25	23:55	Sterkrade/Holten, Ruhr.	Ruhrchemie AG Synthetic oil plant.	16×500	J	NP931
29 November	02:26	08:22	Essen	Industrial areas, including the Krupps works.	1×2000, 16×500	J	NP931
2 December	17:35	00:07	Hagen	Industrial areas – unknown at the time this included a factory making U-boat accumulator batteries.	1×2000 & Incendiary	J	NP931
12 December	16:24	21:58	Essen	Industrial areas, including the Krupps works.	1×2000, 4×1000, 6×500	J	NP931
22 December	15:05	21:33	Bingen am Rhein	Railway yards.	1×2000, 4×1000, 6×500	J	NP931
24 December	11:17	16:42	Essen/Mülheim	Airfields.	5×1000, 8×250	J	NP931

== Aircraft operated ==
Aircraft operated by no. 640 Squadron RAF, data from
From	To	Aircraft	Version
January 1944	March 1945	Handley-Page Halifax	Mk.III
March 1945	May 1945	Handley-Page Halifax	Mk.VI

== Squadron bases ==
Base operated by no. 640 Squadron RAF, data from
From	To	Name
7 January 1944	7 May 1945	RAF Leconfield, East Riding of Yorkshire
