= No. 347 Squadron RAF =

No. 347 (GB I/25 'Tunisie') Squadron RAF
- Active: 20 June 1944 – 15 November 1945
- Country: United Kingdom
- Allegiance: Free French Forces
- Branch: Royal Air Force
- Part of: RAF Bomber Command
- Nickname(s): GB I/25 'Tunisie'

The No. 347 Squadron RAF was a French bomber squadron given a Royal Air Force squadron number during World War II.

== History ==
The squadron was formed at RAF Elvington on 20 June 1944 from GB I/25 ‘Tunisie’ airmen who had been based in the Middle East. It was equipped with British Halifax heavy bomber aircraft and then took part in night bombing raids over Germany.

The squadron moved to Bordeaux in October 1945 after hostilities had ceased and transferred from RAF to French control on 15 November 1945.

== Aircraft operated ==
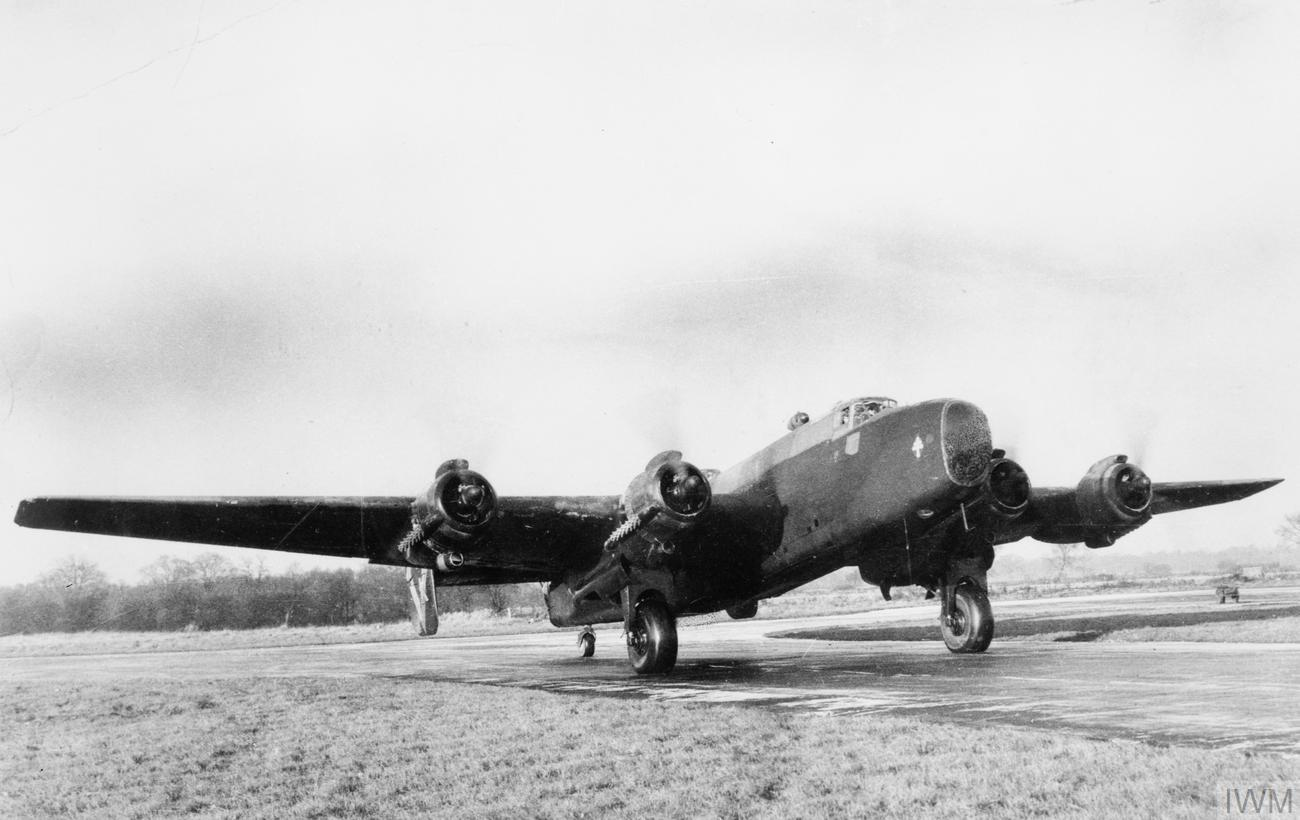
347 Squadron Halifax B Mark III at RAF Elvington

Aircraft operated by no. 347 Squadron RAF
From	To	Aircraft	Variant
Jun 1944	Jul 1944	Handley Page Halifax	V
Jul 1944	Apr 1945	Handley Page Halifax	III
Mar 1945	Nov 1945	Handley Page Halifax	VI
