= RAF Pocklington =

Royal Air Force base in Yorkshire, England

RAF Pocklington
- Pocklington, East Riding of Yorkshire in England
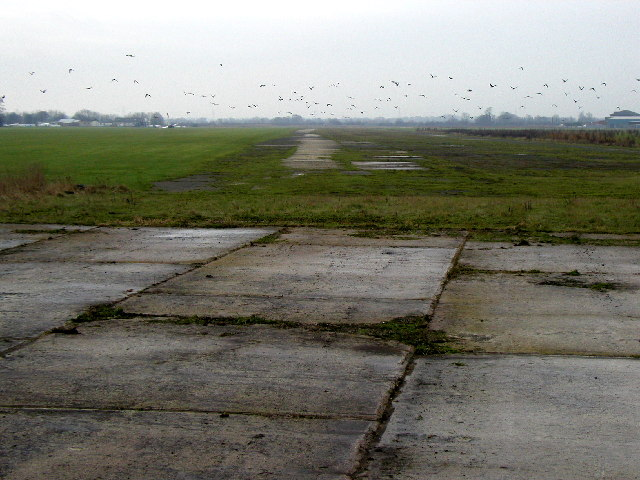
- View across the airfield (2006)

Site information
- Type: Royal Air Force station
- Owner: Air Ministry
- Operator: Royal Air Force; Royal Canadian Air Force
- Controlled by: RAF Bomber Command

Location
- Shown within the East Riding of Yorkshire RAF Pocklington (the United Kingdom)
- Coordinates: 53°55′39″N 000°47′55″W

Site history
- Built: 1940/41
- In use: 1941 - 1946
- Battles/wars: European theatre of World War II

Airfield information
Runways
Direction	Length and surface
13/31	Concrete
18/36	Concrete

Royal Air Force Pocklington or more simply RAF Pocklington was an operational flying station of the Royal Air Force during the Second World War, forming part of RAF Bomber Command, and operating primarily Vickers Wellington and Handley Page Halifax bombers. The station, adjacent to the town of Pocklington at grid reference SE790485, opened in 1941, and was closed in 1946. After a return to agricultural use, the station now forms an industrial estate and a restricted use airfield for a gliding club.

== History ==
Work started on RAF Pocklington in August 1940, with the design for grass runways, along with hangars, technical buildings and administration blocks. This was changed during construction to include three concrete runways. Late into the building of the three runways, it was realised that the runway 3 (07-25 at 1,300 yards) posed a threat to the nearby village of Barmby Moor, and so was abandoned in favour of a fourth runway (13–31 at 1,600 yards).

Three hangars were originally constructed, and these were supplemented by two additional hangars constructed on the other side of the main A1079 road.

The station at RAF Elvington was originally built as a sub station of Pocklington, and along with RAF Melbourne became known as 42 base, within the 4 groups of Bomber Command. Despite being the smaller station, RAF Elvington was operational long after the closure of Pocklington.

== Occupying squadrons ==
The first occupants of the site in 1941 were the Royal Canadian Air Force unit of 405 squadron, operating Wellington bombers for 84 raids in eleven months, during which 20 aircraft failed to return.

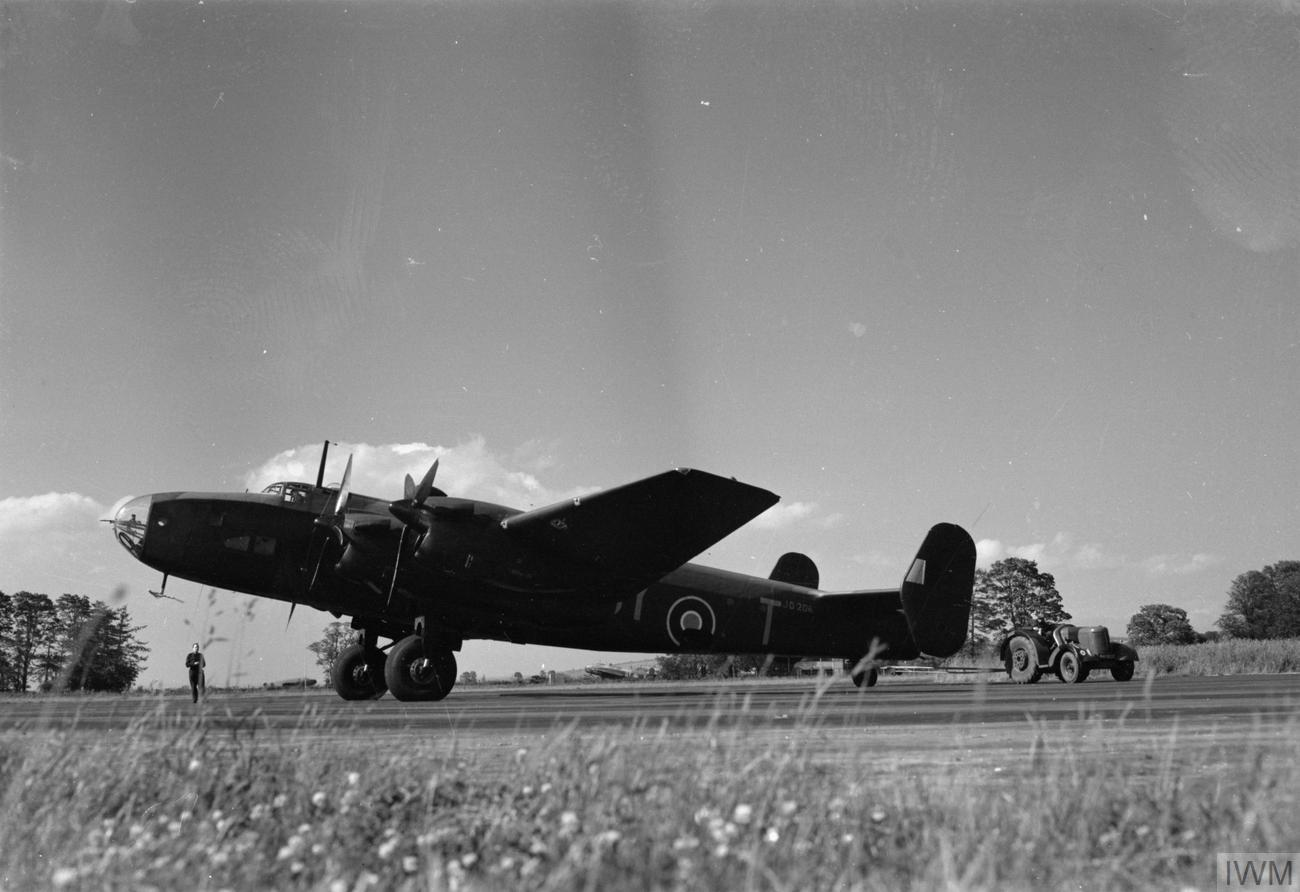
Handley Page Halifax aircraft at RAF Pocklington

In April 1942, the squadron changed to Halifax bombers, flying a further 20 raids before exchanging bases with the Royal Air Force 102 squadron from RAF Topcliffe, and were the last unit to occupy the station until its closure (although a personnel holding unit was briefly based at the base in 1946). The station finally closed in September 1946.

In May 1942 three German air raids occurred in the vicinity of RAF Pocklington. The first was reported on 20 May though only one bomb was dropped near the air base resulting in one Halifax being damaged. The other two raids happened on 27 and 29 May though neither attacked RAF Pocklington.

The station transferred to Transport Command the day before the end of the war, operating Consolidated Liberator aircraft before their transfer to RAF Bassingbourn.

== Subsequent use ==
Following the closure of the station, it was mostly returned to agricultural use, with the hangars used as grain stores, but subsequently the technical area became an industrial estate, and a large number of buildings still stand.

One of the original runways is still in use by the Wolds Gliding Club, who secured the lease to the airfield in 1971, and purchased it outright from the land owner in 1983. Former members of 102 squadron still hold reunion events at the gliding club.
