= No. 102 Squadron RAF =

Defunct flying squadron of the Royal Air Force

No. 102 (Ceylon) Squadron RAF
- No. 102 Squadron badge
- Active: 9 Aug 1917 – 3 Jul 1919; 1 Oct 1935 – 28 Feb 1946; 20 Oct 1954 – 20 Aug 1956; 1 Aug 1959 – 27 Apr 1963
- Country: United Kingdom
- Branch: Royal Air Force
- Nicknames: Ceylon "Morecambe's 'own' Squadron" (Unofficial)
- Mottos: Latin: Tentate et Perficite ("Attempt and achieve")

Insignia
- Squadron Badge heraldry: On a demi-terrestrial globe a lion rampant guardant holding in the forepaws a bomb
- Squadron Codes: TQ (Apr 1939 – Sep 1939); DY (Sep 1939 – May 1945); EF (May 1945 – Feb 1946)

No. 102 Squadron was a Royal Air Force night bomber squadron in the First World War and a heavy bomber squadron in the Second World War. After the war it flew briefly as a transport squadron before being reformed a light bomber unit with the Second Tactical Air Force within RAF Germany. Its last existence was as a Thor strategic missile unit.

== History ==
=== Formation in the First World War ===
No. 102 Squadron was formed in August 1917 as a night bomber unit at Hingham, Norfolk with the RAF F.E.2b and F.E.2ds. It moved to France and specialised in night attacks behind the German lines and in particular railway stations, railway lines, and railway trains. With the end of the First World War the squadron returned to England in March 1919. It disbanded at RAF Lympne on 3 July 1919.

=== Between the Wars ===
102 squadron was formed again on 1 October 1935 at RAF Worthy Down, using men and equipment from 'B' Flight of 7 Squadron. Still in its original role as a night bomber squadron 102 squadron first used the Handley Page Heyford.

In October 1938 the squadron became part of the newly formed No 4 Group (Bomber Command) based at RAF Driffield, Yorkshire and was re-equipped with the Armstrong Whitworth Whitley.

=== Second World War ===
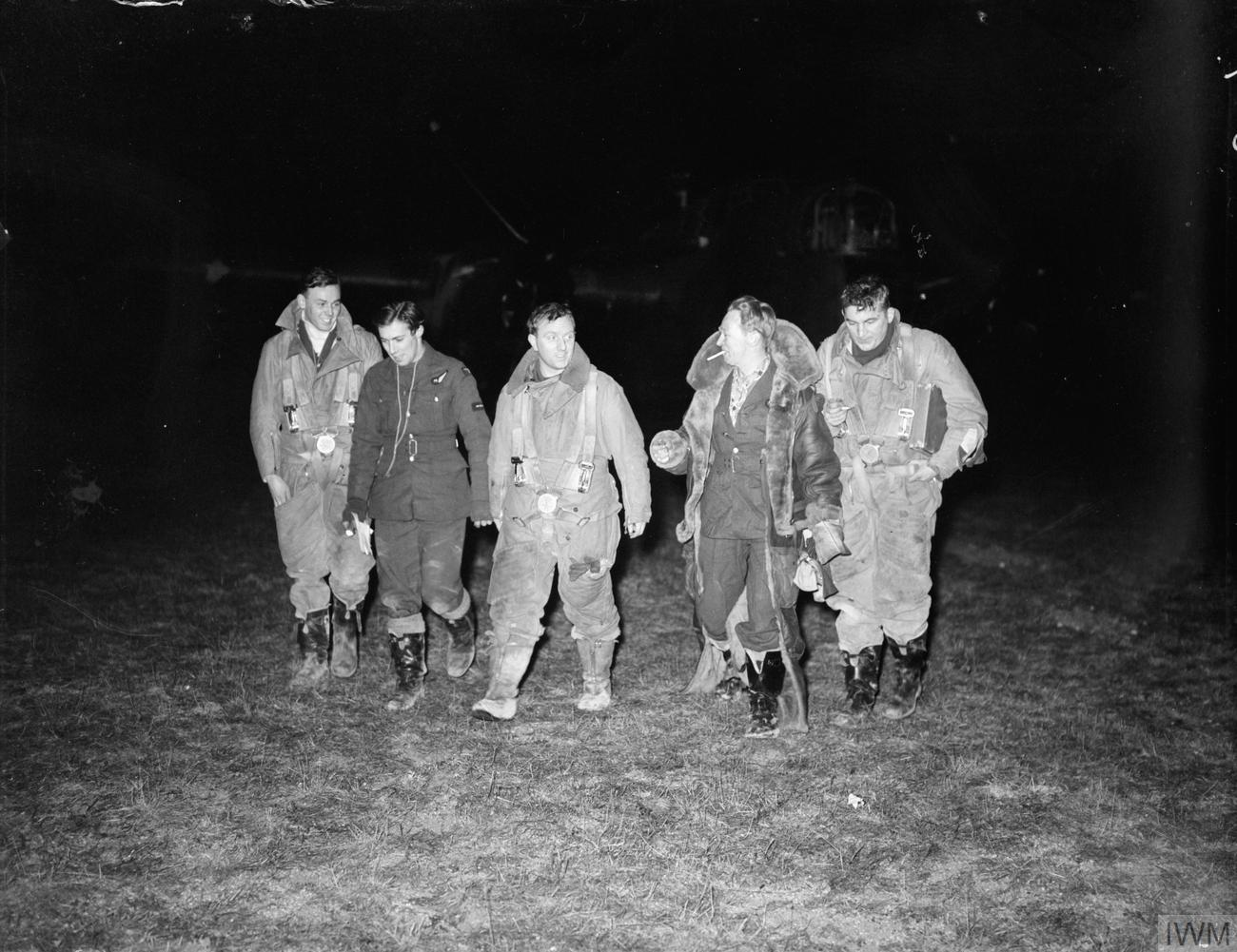
102 Squadron Whitley aircrew walk from their aircraft after dropping leaflets over Prague

The squadron was active from the second day of the Second World War, dropping leaflets in the night from 4 to 5 September 1939 over Germany. From 1 September till 10 October 1940 the squadron was loaned to RAF Coastal Command and spent six weeks carrying out convoy escort duties from RAF Prestwick, before resuming bomber raids. Operations Record Books seen at the Public Record Office in Kew show that two Whitley Mk.Vs flew out of Topcliffe on 27 November 1940 to bomb "docks and shipping" at Le Havre. One of these planes "was not heard from after take off" but the other returned safely having dropped its two 500lb and six 250 lb bombs successfully. By February 1942, the squadron was adopted by the then-Dominion of Ceylon (now Sri Lanka), and the Whitleys were replaced by the Handley Page Halifax. The squadron continued for the next thirty-six months to fly night sorties (including the thousand bomber raids) over Germany. In 1944 the squadron attacked rail targets in France in preparation for the invasion of Normandy.

The squadron spent much time operating as part of No. 4 Group RAF.

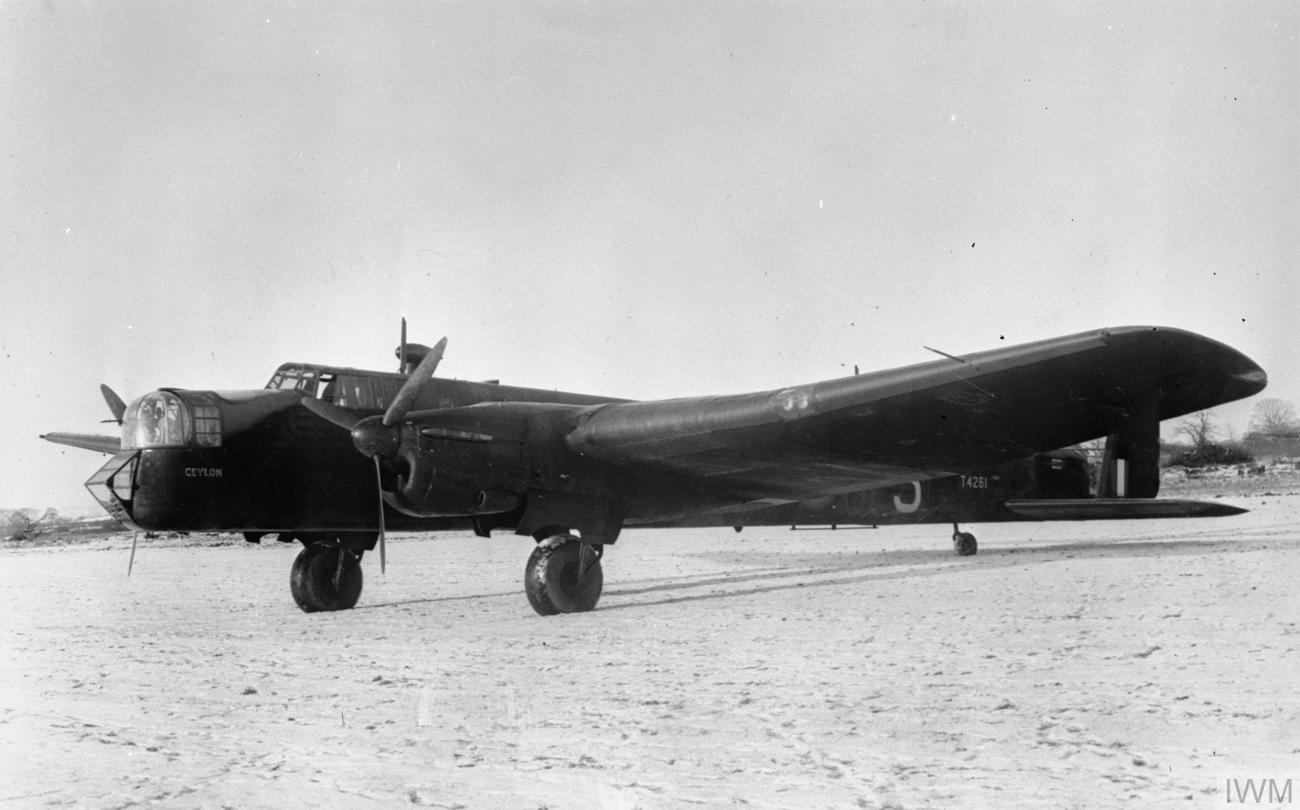
102 Squadron Whitley T4162 'DY-S' "Ceylon" at RAF Topcliffe, later lost on a raid on Cologne in March 1941

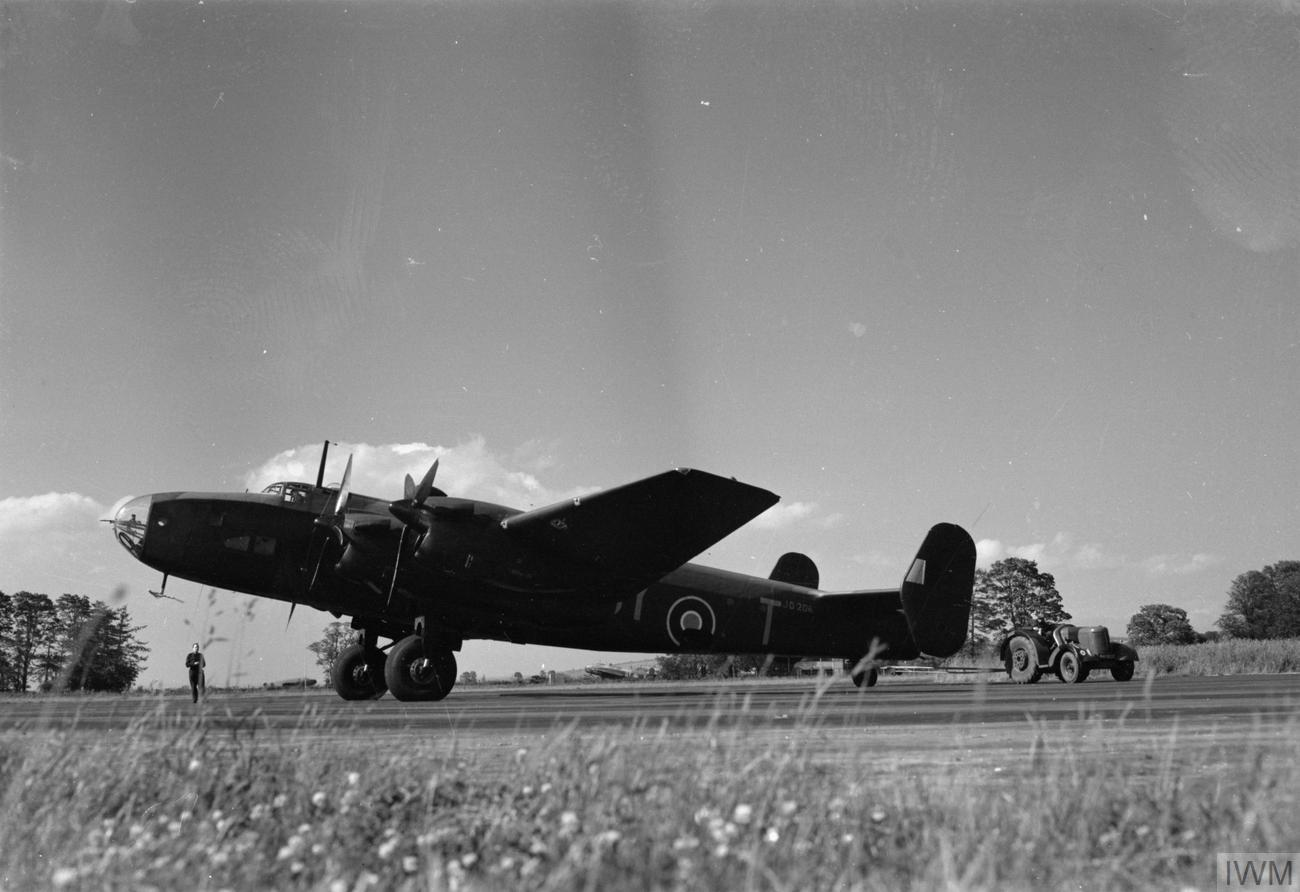
102 Squadron Halifax at RAF Pocklington

=== To Transport Command ===
On 8 March 1945 the squadron was transferred to Transport Command and in September 1945 re-equipped with Consolidated Liberators. Based as RAF Bassingbourn. Its main role was the return of troops and prisoners of war from India. With this work finished the squadron transferred on 15 February 1946 to RAF Upwood where it disbanded on 28 February 1946 by being renumbered to 53 Squadron. From 1 February 1949 to 19 October 1954 the squadron's numberplate was linked with that of 49 squadron, as 49/102 squadron.

=== Conversion to nuclear strike bomber squadron ===
On 20 October 1954 the squadron was reformed as part of RAF Germany as a nuclear strike bomber squadron with the English Electric Canberra B.2 based at RAF Gütersloh. It was disbanded again on 20 August 1956 when it was renumbered to 59 Squadron.

=== On missiles ===
The squadron was last reformed as No. 102 (SM) Squadron RAF (SM standing for "Strategic Missile") in August 1959, equipped with three PGM-17 Thor ballistic missiles, carrying a 1.4 megaton W-49 nuclear warhead, as part of the UK-US strategic deterrent, Project Emily. It was based at RAF Full Sutton in Yorkshire until it was disbanded, along with the other Thor squadrons, on 27 April 1963.

== Aircraft operated ==
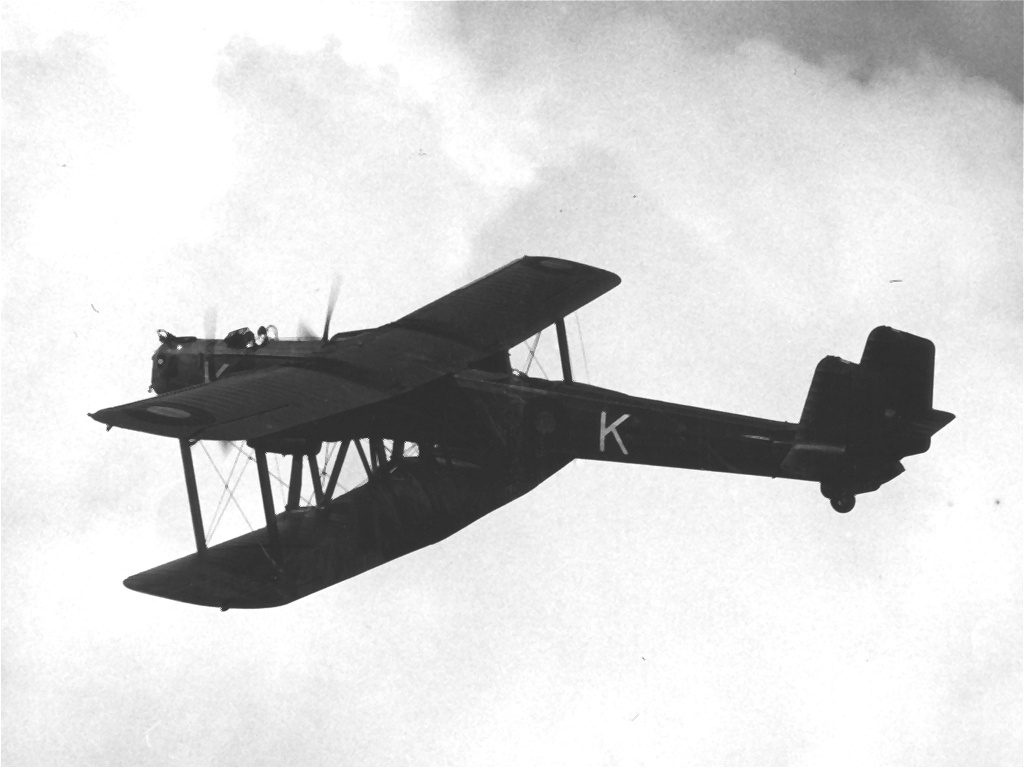
Heyford Mk.II of 102 sqn, late 1936

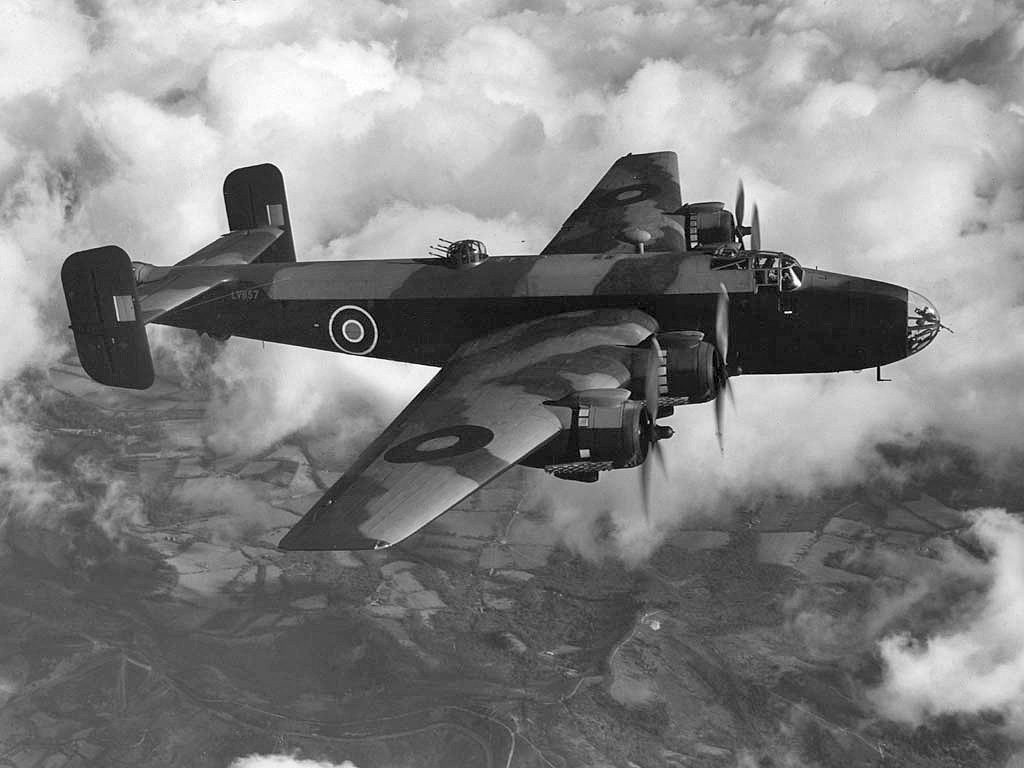
A Handley Page Halifax Mk.III, as used by 102 sqn.

Aircraft operated by No. 102 Squadron
From	To	Aircraft	Variant
Aug 1917	Jul 1919	Royal Aircraft Factory FE.2	FE.2b and 2d
Oct 1935	Apr 1937	Handley Page Heyford	Mk.II
Dec 1935	May 1939	Handley Page Heyford	Mk.III
Oct 1938	Jan 1940	Armstrong Whitworth Whitley	Mk.III
Nov 1939	Feb 1942	Armstrong Whitworth Whitley	Mk.V
Dec 1941	May 1944	Handley Page Halifax	Mk. II
May 1944	Sep 1945	Handley Page Halifax	Mks.III and IIIa
Jul 1945	Sep 1945	Handley Page Halifax	Mk.VI
Sep 1945	Feb 1946	Consolidated Liberator	Mks.VI and VIII
Oct 1954	Aug 1956	English Electric Canberra	B.2
Aug 1959	Apr 1963	PGM-17 Thor Intermediate-range ballistic missile	SM.75

== Trivia ==
Pilot Officer (later Flight Lieutenant) Alfred B. Thompson, a pilot in 102 Squadron, was (on 9 September 1939) the first Canadian to be captured in the Second World War, is the Canadian who was the longest held ever as a prisoner of war, and was a participant in the Great Escape (Stalag Luft III escape) (he was the 68th man to go out through the tunnel).

Lincoln Lynch (Lyncoln Orville Lynch 1920 – 22 October 2011) a Jamaican and later Jamaican-American civil rights activist was Flight Sergeant and rear gunner on a 102 Squadron Halifax, earning a DFM in September 1944

Leonard Cheshire was a Pilot Officer with 102 Squadron from July 1940. In November 1940 he was awarded the DSO for flying his badly damaged Whitley back to base.

The squadron was adopted by the island of Ceylon in February 1942, which paid for aircraft for use by the squadron.

The log book of Flight Lieutenant Leonard Todd DFC from August 1943 shows the frequency and range of the missions flown by the 102 Squadron.

== See also ==
- List of Royal Air Force aircraft squadrons
- List of UK Thor missile bases
