= RAF Melbourne =

Royal Air Force base in Yorkshire, England

RAF Melbourne
- Melbourne, East Riding of Yorkshire in England
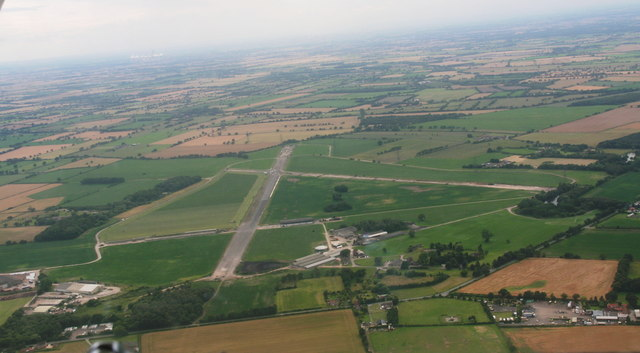
- Aerial view (2014)

Site information
- Type: Royal Air Force station
- Owner: Air Ministry
- Operator: Royal Air Force
- Controlled by: RAF Bomber Command; RAF Transport Command

Location
- Shown within East Riding of Yorkshire RAF Melbourne (the United Kingdom)
- Coordinates: 53°52′04″N 000°50′19″W

Site history
- Built: 1940 & 1942
- In use: 1940 - 1954
- Battles/wars: European theatre of World War II

Airfield information
Runways
Direction	Length and surface
00/00	Concrete
00/00	Concrete
00/00	Concrete

Royal Air Force Melbourne or more simply RAF Melbourne is a former Royal Air Force station located near Melbourne, East Riding of Yorkshire, England.

== History ==
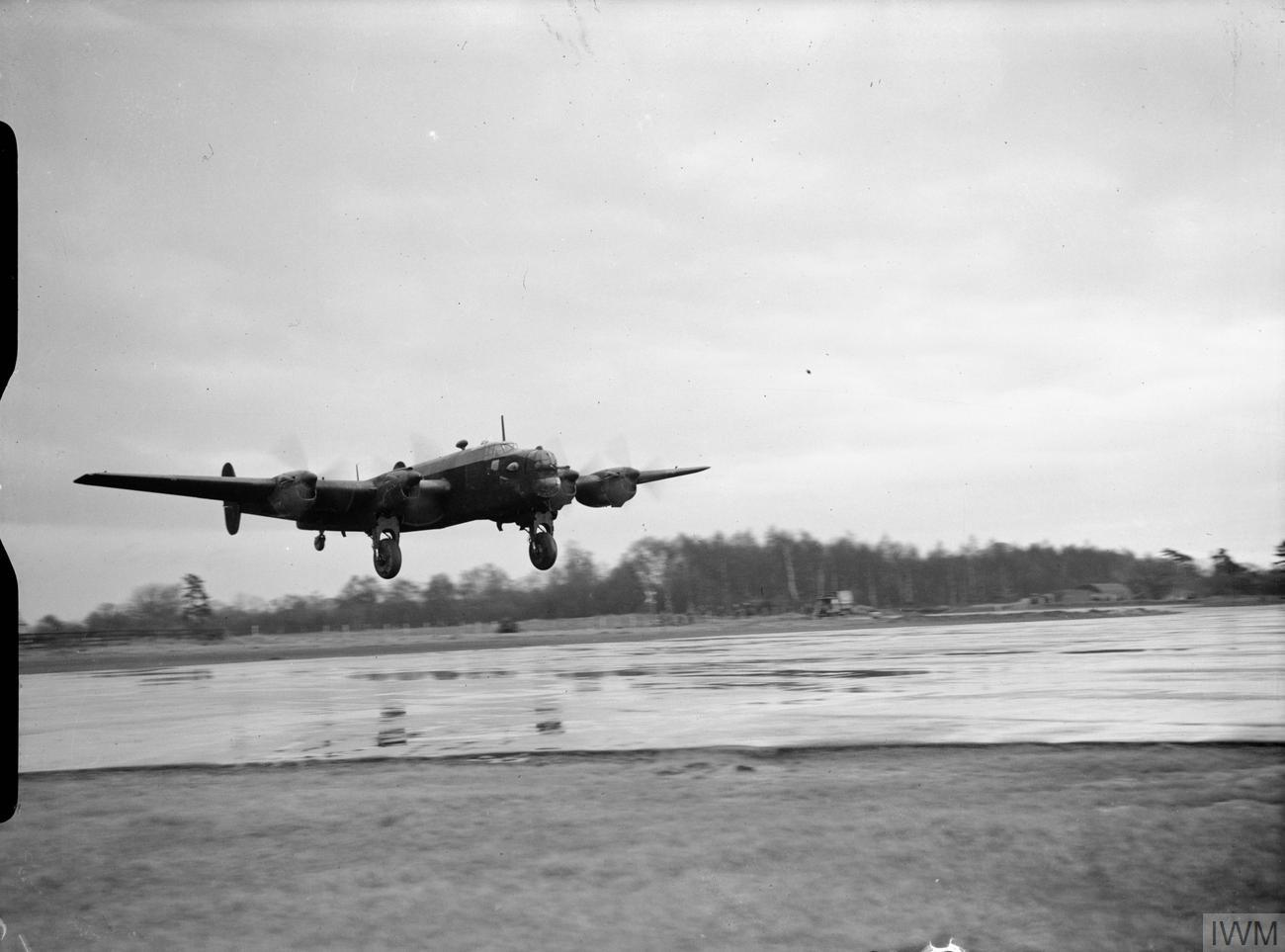
Handley Page Halifax aircraft landing at RAF Melbourne during the Second World War

East Common just outside the village of Seaton Ross was requisitioned for use as a grass airfield in November 1940. In late 1940 the airfield was used by Armstrong Whitworth Whitleys of 10 Squadron as a relief landing ground for RAF Leeming. The airfield soon closed for re-development as a standard RAF Bomber Command airfield with three concrete runways and three hangars.

The first user of the re-built airfield was again 10 Squadron but by this time operating the Handley Page Halifax four-engined heavy bomber, little time was wasted before the aircraft were used on operational sorties from Melbourne. The squadron continued with operation until March 1945 and lost 109 aircraft on operations.

Melbourne was one of seventeen sites equipped with FIDO fog dispersant system. This made the airfield a popular diversion for other squadrons returning from operations to Yorkshire in extreme bad weather conditions.

In May 1945 the airfield was transferred to RAF Transport Command and 575 Squadron moved in with the Douglas Dakota. The squadron only stayed for a few months operating transport flight to and from continental Europe. With the departure of the Dakota a number of specialised Flights used the airfield for six months but by the middle of 1946 the airfield was no longer used for flying.

== RAF units and aircraft ==
Unit	Dates	Aircraft	Variant	Notes
No. 10 Squadron RAF	1942–1945	Handley Page Halifax	II converted to III from 1944	Four-engined heavy bomber.
No. 575 Squadron RAF	1946	Douglas Dakota		Twin-engined transport.
No. 1510 (BABS) Flight RAF	1945–1946	Airspeed Oxford		Blind approach training flight
No. 1552 (Radio Aids Training) Flight RAF	1945–1946	Airspeed Oxford; Avro Anson		Blind approach training flight
No. 1553 (Radio Aids Training) Flight RAF	1945	Airspeed Oxford		Blind approach training flight
No. 1554 (Radio Aids Training) Flight RAF	1945	Airspeed Oxford		Blind approach training flight

Other units:

- No. 4 Group Communication Flight RAF (1945–1946)
- No. 91 Maintenance Unit RAF (1949–1954)
- No. 10 Conversion Flight RAF
- No. 1658 Heavy Conversion Unit RAF
- No. 2820 Squadron RAF Regiment
- No. 4275 Anti-Aircraft Flight RAF Regiment
- Aircrew Testing and Grading Unit RAF
- Transport Command Aircrew Examining Unit RAF

== Current use ==
The site was used for a farmers market in the 1970s, but was gradually adapted into a racing track. Until 2017 the airfield was home to York Raceway running drag racing throughout the summer. York Raceway did not operate at Melbourne in 2018 or 2019. After a fundraising effort a new drag strip was laid and drag racing returned to Melbourne in August 2020. The airfield strip is now home to Melbourne Raceway running drag racing under the organisation of Straightliners. The runway is also used for flying by Pocklington Gyroplane School for Saturday afternoon meets.
