= RAF Driffield =

Royal Air Force base in Yorkshire, England

RAF Driffield RAF Eastburn Driffield Training Area
- Driffield, East Riding of Yorkshire in England
- Station badge

Site information
- Type: Royal Air Force station * Parent station 1936–43 * 43 Base HQ 1943–45
- Code: DR
- Owner: Ministry of Defence
- Operator: 1918–1920 Royal Air Force; 1936–1977 Royal Air Force; 1977–1992 British Army; 1992–1996 Royal Air Force; 1996–present Defence Training Estate
- Controlled by: RAF Bomber Command * No. 2 Group RAF * No. 4 Group RAF * No. 6 Group RCAF

Location
- Shown within the East Riding of Yorkshire
- Coordinates: 53°59′41″N 000°29′11″W

Site history
- Built: 1918 as RAF Eastburn; 1935 as RAF Driffield
- In use: July 1936 – 1996
- Battles/wars: European theatre of World War II; Cold War

Airfield information
- Elevation: 19 metres (62 ft) AMSL
Runways
Direction	Length and surface
00/00	Concrete
00/00	Concrete
00/00	Concrete

Royal Air Force Driffield or RAF Driffield is a former Royal Air Force station in the East Riding of Yorkshire, in England. It lies about 2 miles (3 km) south-west of Driffield and 11 miles (18 km) north-west of Beverley. It is now operated by the Defence Infrastructure Organisation, as the Driffield Training Area.

== History ==
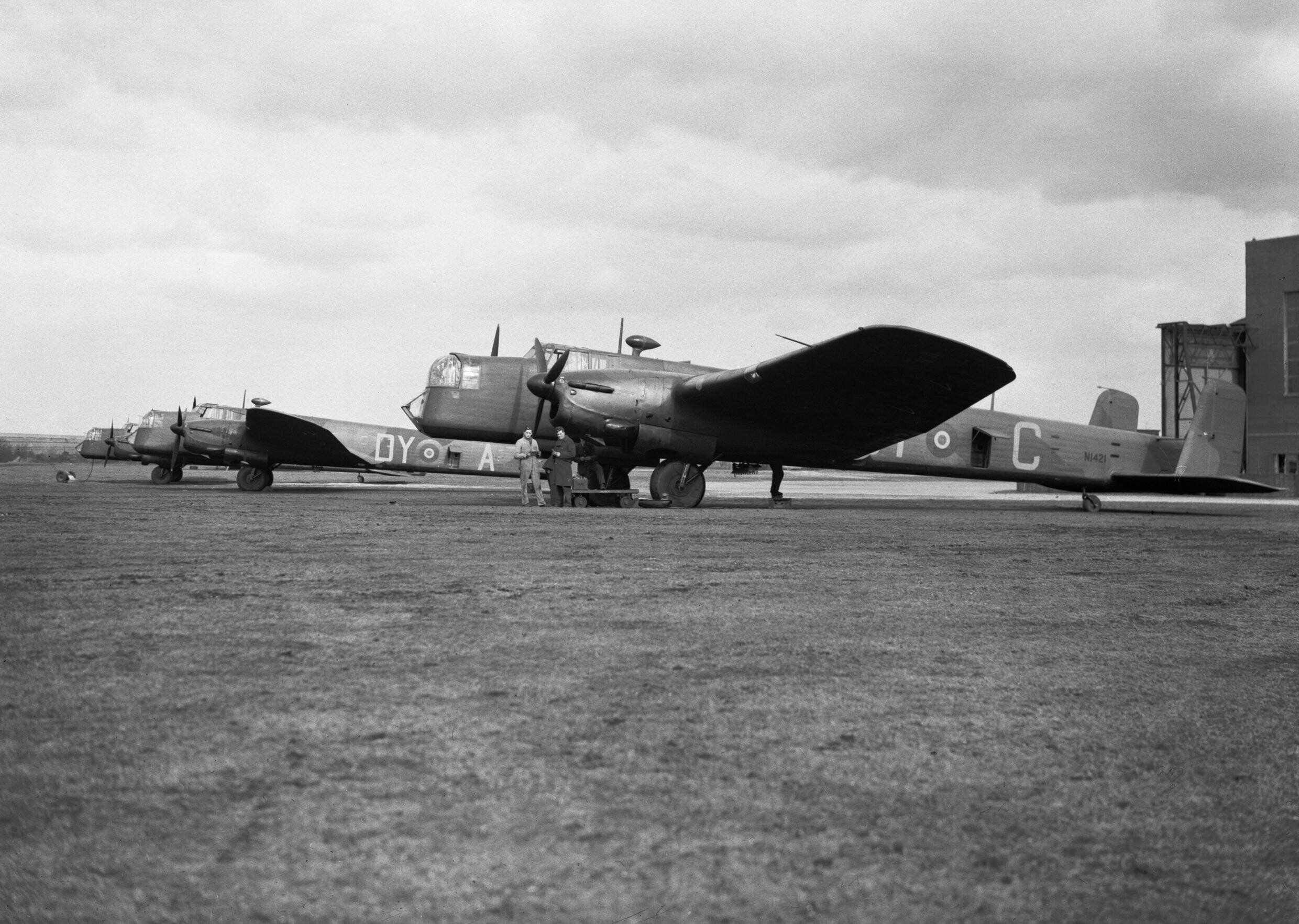
Armstrong Whitworth Whitley Mk Vs of No. 102 Squadron RAF being prepared for a leaflet-dropping sortie at Driffield, Yorkshire, 7 March 1940

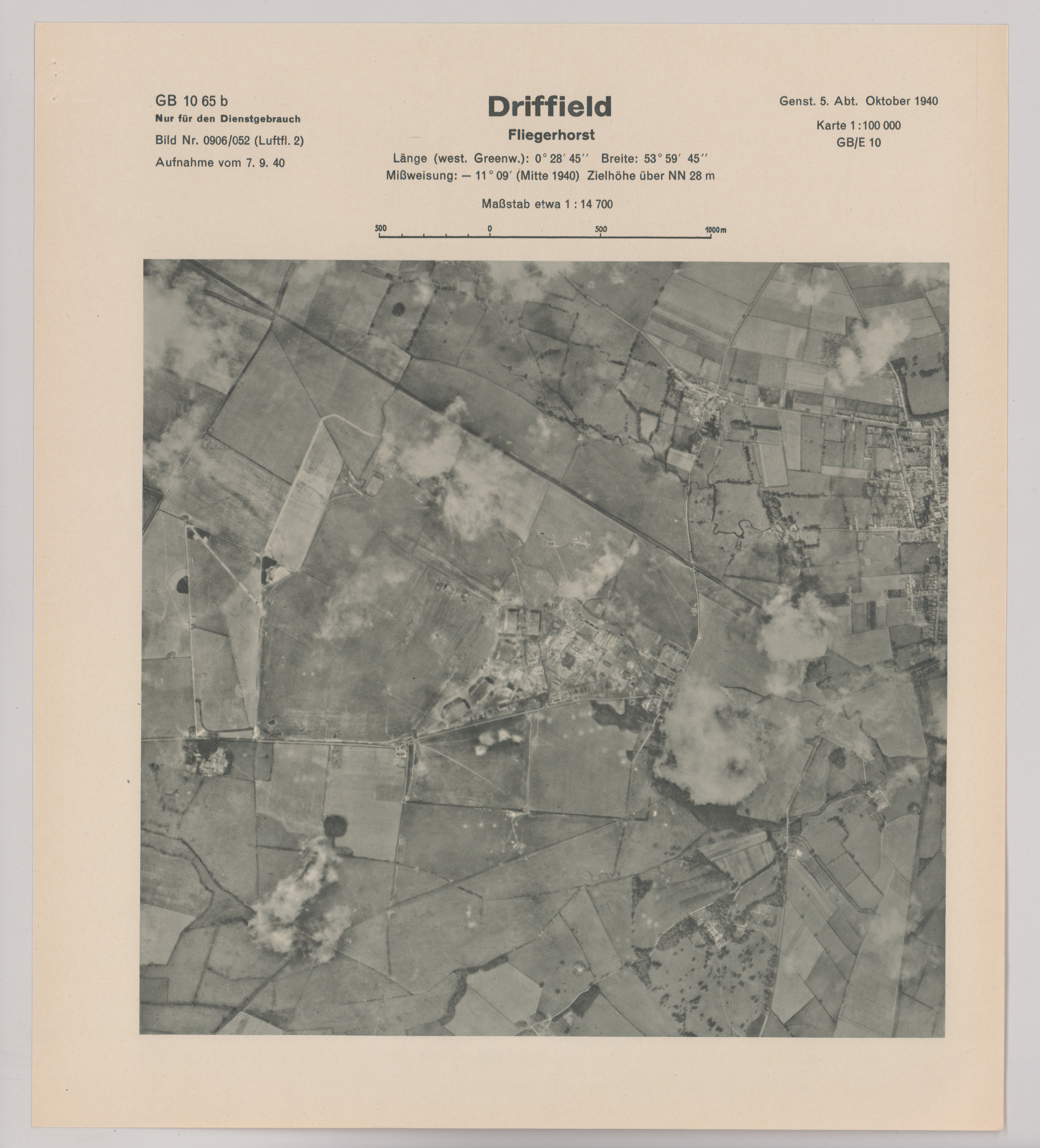
RAF Driffield on a target dossier of the German Luftwaffe, 1940

The site was first opened in 1918 by the Royal Air Force under the name of RAF Eastburn, and closed in 1920. In 1935 a new airfield was built, initially training bomber crews. In 1977 the site was turned over to the British Army for use as a driving school, and was renamed Alamein Barracks, a satellite to Normandy Barracks of the Defence School of Transport at Leconfield.

The station was the initial posting of Leonard Cheshire VC, who was at that time a member of 102 (Ceylon) Squadron.

On 15 August 1940 there was a German air raid on the airfield. Casualties included the first fatality in the Women's Auxiliary Air Force (WAAF).

On 4 June 1941 RAF Driffield was attacked by German aircraft which resulted in one Wellington, of No. 405 Squadron RCAF, being destroyed and another damaged.

On 1 August 1959, the station was armed with PGM-17 Thor ballistic missiles, which were subsequently decommissioned by April 1963.

== Units ==
The following units were here at some point:

- No. 1 Fighter Command Modification Centre RAF
- No. 2 Blind Approach Training Flight RAF (April – October 1941) became No. 1502 (Beam Approach Training) Flight RAF (October 1941 – July 1943)
- No. 2 (Coastal) Operational Training Unit RAF (October 1940 – 1941)
- No. 2 School of Aerial Fighting RAF (October 1917 – May 1918) became No. 3 School of Aerial Fighting and Gunnery RAF (May 1918)
- No. 4 Group Target Towing Flight RAF (February 1940 – November 1941)
- No. 5 Group Target Towing Flight RAF (February 1940 – April 1941)
- Detachment of No. 5 Service Flying Training School RAF (March 1941)
- Detachment of No. 6 Anti-Aircraft Co-operation Unit RAF (June – July 1943)
- No. 8 Flying Training School RAF (June 1954 – August 1955)
- No. 10 Air Navigation School RAF (September 1946 – March 1948)
- No. 21 Training Depot Station (July 1918 – July 1919) became No. 21 Training Squadron (July 1919 – February 1920)
- No. 43 Base RAF (June 1943 – September 1945)
- No. 75 (New Zealand) Squadron RAF
- No. 102 (Ceylon) Squadron RAF
- No. 104 Squadron RAF
- No. 203 Advanced Flying School RAF (September 1949 – June 1954)
- No. 204 Advanced Flying School RAF (March 1948 – August 1949)
- No. 226 Operational Conversion Unit RAF (August 1949)
- No. 1484 (Target Towing) Flight RAF (November 1941 – January 1942) became No. 1484 (Target Towing and Gunnery Flight) RAF (January – December 1942) became No. 1484 (Bombing) Gunnery Flight RAF (December 1942 – July 1943)
- No. 1613 (Anti-Aircraft Co-operation) Flight RAF (February – July 1943)
- Air Bomber Training Flight, No. 4 Group (June 1942 – March 1943)
- Aircrew Transit Unit (November 1949 – December 1951)
- Detachment of Air Fighting Development Unit RAF
- Fighter Weapons School (October 1957 – March 1958)
