= Baheira Airfield =

Abandoned World War II airfield in Libya

Site information
- Type: Military Airfield
- Code: LG-167
- Controlled by: Regia Aeronautica (1941-1942); Royal Australian Air Force (1942-1943); United States Army Air Forces (1943)

Location
- Coordinates: 31°46′40″N 025°02′40″E

Site history
- Built: 1941
- In use: 1941-1945

Location of Baheira Airfield, Libya

Baheira Airfield, or Bir El Baheira is an abandoned military airfield in Libya, which is located in the eastern desert near the Egypt–Libya border, about 48 km west of Bardīyah; 3 km west of Bi'r al Buhayrah.

Apparently a prewar Italian Air Force (Regia Aeronautica) airfield, it was used by the Royal Air Force in the early part of the Eastern Desert Campaign. Driven from the airfield by advancing Afrika Corps units in 1942, it was used by the Luftwaffe in support of Rommel's drive into Egypt. The Germans were driven out after the Second Battle of El Alamein by the British Eighth Army, it was then used by the United States Army Air Force as a heavy bomber base by IX Bomber Command. 98th Bombardment Group, which flew B-24 Liberators from the field between 29 January and 14 February 1943.

When the Americans moved out, the base was abandoned. Today the airfield exists in the desert, relatively intact despite the rages of time and the harsh desert climate. Twin runways are clearly visible, along with the round perimeter track and many dispersal hardstands. Parking ramps are clearly in evidence, along with the remains of the bomb/storage/supply dump and the remains of buildings in the technical site away from the airfield. Many connecting streets are visible in aerial imagery, however all of the above are clearly worn and decayed by the desert sands.

== See also ==
- No. 462 Squadron RAAF
