= Westminster Airways =

British airline

Westminster Airways ltd. was a British airline formed in 1946 to operate charters. It later acquired freighter aircraft and was involved in the Berlin Airlift, but ceased operations shortly after.

== History ==
The airline was formed on 5 June 1946 by a group of MPs led by Air Commodore A.V. Harvey. The first aircraft in the fleet were twin-engined Airspeed Consuls. The Consuls immediately operated charter flights from Blackbushe and Gatwick airports. Later in 1946 the company bought two Douglas DC-3s. The Consul fleet rose to six aircraft, four of which were leased to BEA towards the end of April 1947 for their London to Helsinki service, at least until early October when the route was abandoned due to poor traffic.

In July, 1948, the Consuls began operating scheduled services between Croydon and Cowes, Isle of Wight, under a BEA Associate Agreement and from August 4, 1948, a Dakota was pressed into service hauling loads from Fassberg and later, Lübeck in support of the Berlin Airlift. Westminster’s aircraft were finally withdrawn from the airlift on July 12, 1949, having completed 772 sorties during which 4,443 tonnes had been uplifted during the course of some 2,314 flying hours.

The company ceased operations in autumn 1949 when the board of directors decided to cease flying due to the restrictions imposed on air charter companies by United Kingdom government policies and legislation.

== Fleet ==
- Airspeed Consul
- Douglas DC-3
- Handley Page Halifax
- Handley Page Halton

== Accidents and incidents ==
On 1 April 1949 one of the airlines Haltons crashed at RAF Schleswigland during the airlift.
