= Handley Page Halifax =

Royal Air Force bomber aircraft of WWII

Halifax
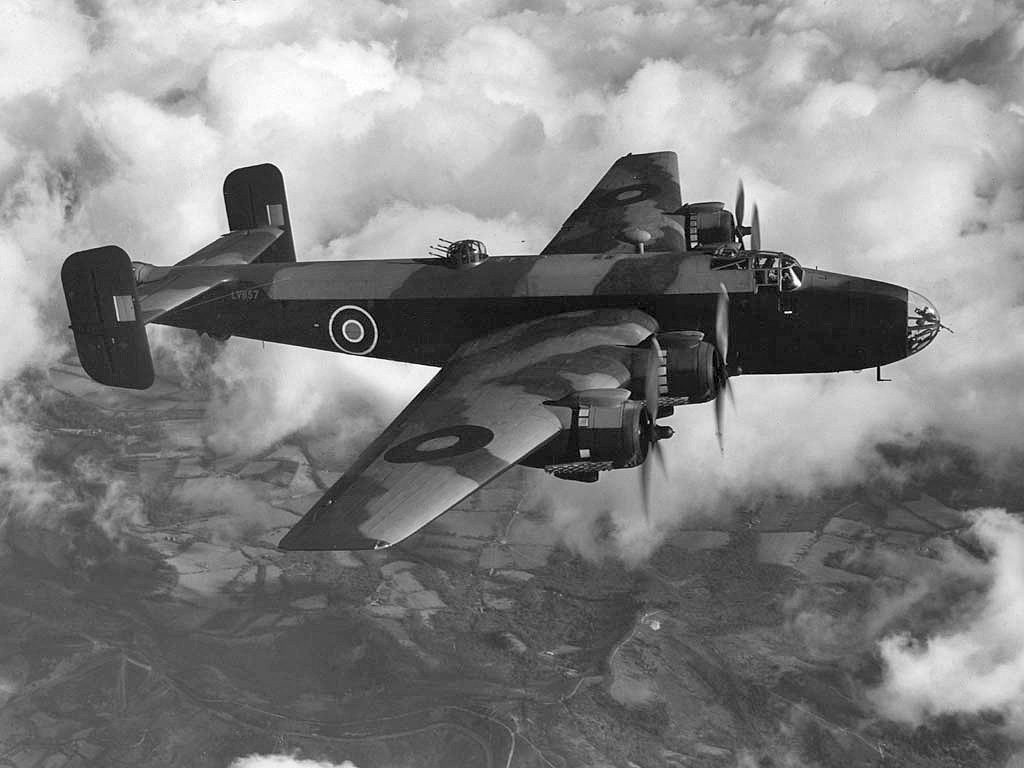
- Handley Page Halifax B.III

General information
- Type: Heavy bomber
- National origin: United Kingdom
- Manufacturer: Handley Page
- Status: Retired
- Primary users: Royal Air Force RCAF; RAAF; Free French Air Force
- Number built: 6,178 including 2 H.P.57 prototypes

History
- Manufactured: 1940–1946
- Introduction date: 13 November 1940
- First flight: 25 October 1939
- Retired: 1961 (Pakistan Air Force)

The Handley Page Halifax is a British Royal Air Force (RAF) four-engined heavy bomber of the Second World War. It was developed by Handley Page to the same specification as the contemporary twin-engine Avro Manchester.

The Halifax has its origins in the twin-engine H.P.56 proposal of the late 1930s, produced in response to the British Air Ministry's Specification P.13/36 for a capable medium bomber for "world-wide use." The H.P.56 was ordered as a backup to the Avro 679, both aircraft being designed to use the Rolls-Royce Vulture engine. The Handley Page design was altered to use four Rolls-Royce Merlin engines while the rival Avro 679 was produced as the twin-engine Avro Manchester which, while regarded as unsuccessful mainly due to the Vulture engine, was a direct predecessor of the Avro Lancaster. Both the Lancaster and the Halifax emerged as capable four-engine strategic bombers, thousands of which were used during the War.

The Halifax performed its first flight on 25 October 1939, and entered service with the RAF on 13 November 1940. It quickly became a major component of Bomber Command, performing strategic bombing missions against the Axis powers, primarily at night. Arthur Harris, the Air Officer Commanding-in-Chief of Bomber Command, described the Halifax as inferior to the rival Lancaster (in part due to its smaller payload) though this opinion was not shared by many of the crews that flew it. Nevertheless, production of the Halifax continued until April 1945. During their service with Bomber Command, AIR 22/203 Bomber Command War manual figures, Halifaxes flew 73,312 bomber, 3,716 sea mine, 365 anti-submarine and 5,745 other sorties (like radio counter measures), for a total of 83,138 sorties, with a total of 1,833 aircraft missing and 403 written off. Bombs dropped on bombing sorties amounted to 224,207 or 223,654.7 long tons. Bombs were also dropped on other sorties. Pathfinder Halifaxes reportedly dropped 474.7 long tons of bombs.

The Halifax was also flown in large numbers by other Allied and Commonwealth nations, such as the Royal Canadian Air Force (RCAF), Royal Australian Air Force (RAAF), and Free French Air Force.

Various improved versions of the Halifax were introduced, incorporating more powerful engines, a revised defensive turret layout and increased payload. It remained in service with Bomber Command until the end of the war, performing a variety of duties in addition to bombing. Specialised versions of the Halifax were developed for troop transport and paradrop operations. After the Second World War, the RAF quickly retired the Halifax, the type being succeeded as a strategic bomber by the Avro Lincoln, an advanced derivative of the Lancaster. During the post-war years, the Halifax was operated by the Royal Egyptian Air Force, the French Air Force and the Royal Pakistan Air Force. The type also entered commercial service for a number of years, used mainly as a freighter. A dedicated civil transport variant, the Handley Page Halton, was also developed and entered airline service; 41 civil Halifax freighters were used during the Berlin Airlift. In 1961, the last remaining Halifax bombers were retired from operational use.

== Development ==
=== Origins ===
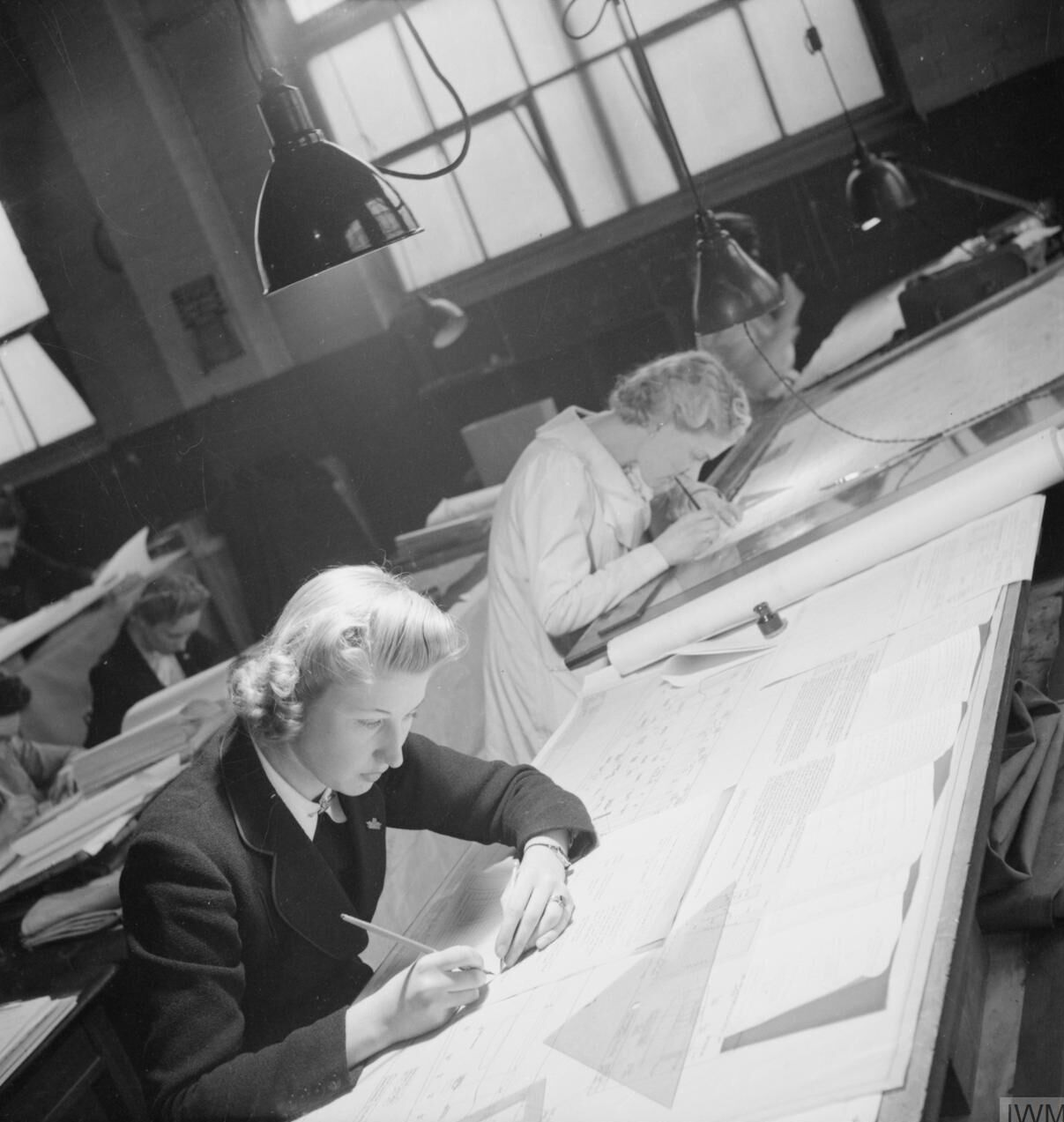
Personnel in the Handley Page drawing office working on the Halifax bomber

In the 1930s, the Royal Air Force (RAF) was primarily interested in twin-engine bombers. These designs put significant demands on engine production and maintenance, both of which were already stretched with the introduction of many new types of aircraft into service. Power limitations were so serious that the British invested heavily in the development of huge engines in the 2,000 hp (1,500 kW) class to improve performance. However, during the late 1930s, none of these engines were ready for production. Meanwhile, the United States, France, Germany and the Soviet Union were developing bombers powered with four engines with favourable results, including excellent range and lifting capacity. Accordingly, in 1936, the RAF decided to investigate the feasibility of a four-engined bomber.

During the mid-1930s, the British Air Ministry released Specification P.13/36, seeking a twin-engine heavy-medium bomber suitable for "world-wide use". Further requirements of the specification included the use of a mid-mounted cantilever monoplane wing and all-metal construction, and encouraged use of the Rolls-Royce Vulture engine then in development. In response, Handley Page produced the twin-engine H.P.56 design to meet Specification P.13/36. Handley Page aircraft designer George Volkert had responsibility for the design, assisted in various aspects by Gustav Lachmann, J.W.Ratcliffe, and R.S.Stafford.

Other candidates were submitted for the same specification, including the Avro 679, and designs from Fairey, Boulton Paul and Shorts. All submissions used two engines, using the Rolls-Royce Vulture, Napier Sabre, Fairey P.24 or Bristol Hercules engines. All of these engines were under development and while four-engined bomber designs were considered for specification B.12/36 for a heavy bomber, wings mounting two pairs of engines required additional testing at the Royal Aircraft Establishment (RAE). A stronger wing also required additional strengthening of the overall aircraft structure, increasing design weight.

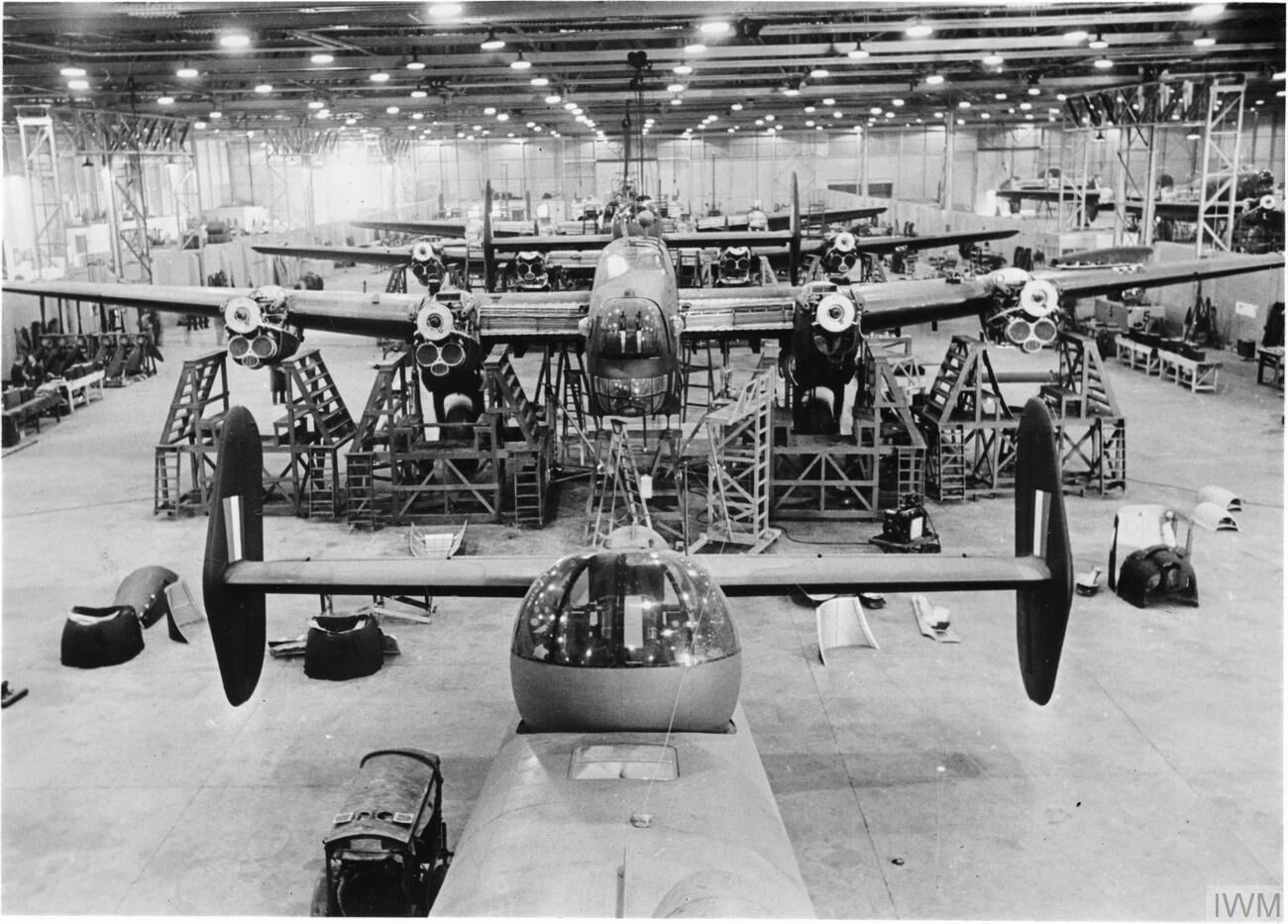
Halifax bombers being built at the Handley Page factory at Cricklewood, 1942

In February 1937, following consideration of the designs, the Air Ministry selected Avro's submission, with Handley Page's bid chosen as "second string". Accordingly, during April 1937, the Air Ministry ordered two prototypes of each design. The introduction of the successful P.13/36 candidates was delayed by orders for Armstrong-Whitworth Whitley and Vickers Wellington bombers. In mid-1937, it was decided to order both the Avro 679 and H.P.56 designs "off the drawing board" in order to speed up delivery timetables.

During July 1937, Handley Page was instructed to redesign the H.P.56 to use four engines. The Vulture had already been suffering reliability and performance problems. The rival Avro 679 proceeded into service as the Avro Manchester powered by a pair of Vulture engines, but was only built in limited quantities after suffering substantially from engine trouble. The four-engine redesign increased its wingspan from 88 ft (27 m) to 99 ft (30 m) and added 13,000 pounds (5,900 kg) of weight. In September 1937, the Ministry specified the use of four Rolls-Royce Merlin engines; according to aviation author Phillip J. R. Moyes, this redesign to four Merlin engines was done "much against the company's wishes".

Towards the end of the year, a full-size mock-up was assessed and production of a pair of H.P.57 prototypes commenced in March 1938. Further design modifications resulted in the definitive aircraft, now considerably enlarged and powered by four 1,280 hp (950 kW) Rolls-Royce Merlin X engines. Such was the promise of the new model that, in January 1938, the RAF chose to place their first production order for the type, ordering 100 Mk.I Halifaxes "off the drawing board", at which point the serials which had already been assigned to the H.P.56 were switched to the H.P.57.

=== Prototypes ===
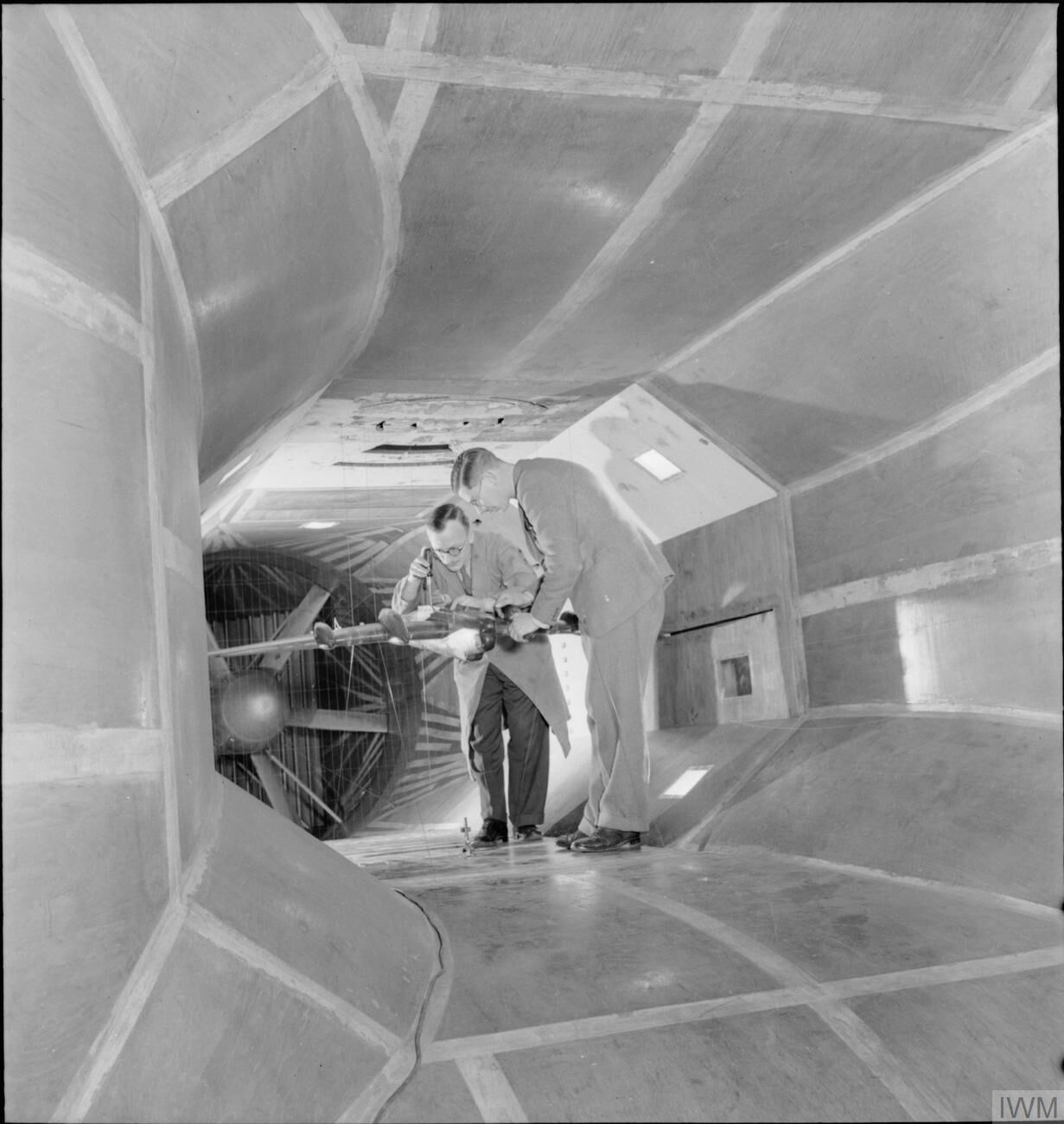
Aerodynamic model of the Halifax undergoing wind tunnel testing, 1942

The first prototype was built at Handley Page's facility in Cricklewood, London, It was then dismantled and transported by road to RAF Bicester (the nearest non-operational RAF airfield with suitable facilities) for reassembly. The first flight of the first prototype Halifax, serial number L7244, was performed by chief test pilot Jim Cordes with E A 'Ginger' Wright as flight test observer on 25 October 1939. During this flight, the undercarriage was locked down as a safety precaution. On 17 August 1940, the first flight of the second prototype, L7245, now complete with full armament and operational equipment, was made from Radlett Aerodrome. The H.P.57 was given the service name Halifax upon acceptance. This name followed the practice of naming heavy bombers after major towns, which in this case was Halifax in Yorkshire. In September 1941, a production Halifax Mk.I participated in an official naming ceremony of the type, officiated by Lord Halifax and Lady Halifax.

=== Production ===
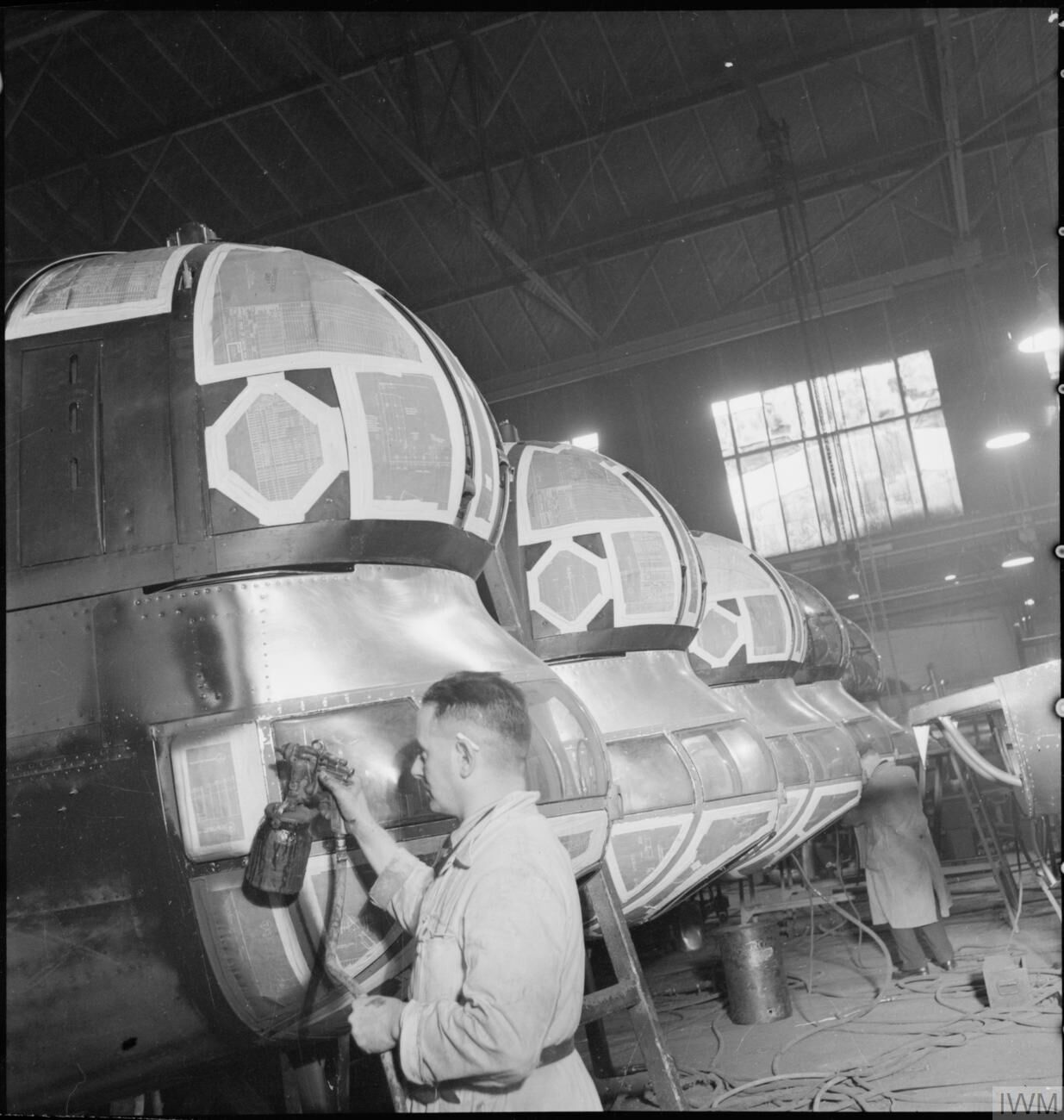
Painters at work in the paint shop of the Handley Page's Cricklewood factory, 1942

Series production of the Halifax began at Handley Page's factory at Cricklewood and at English Electric's site in Samlesbury, Lancashire. In order to speed up production, Handley Page implemented several new manufacturing techniques, including two pioneering approaches: photo-lofting and split construction. In the latter capacity, each Halifax was built from various sub-assemblies. Surface panels were flush-riveted, although the matt black night bomber camouflage negated its benefit.

Handley Page built the assemblies and components at Cricklewood and the aircraft were assembled and flown from Radlett Aerodrome. The first production aircraft flew from Radlett on 11 October 1940.

The sizeable production run envisioned required the involvement of several other companies in addition to Handley Page. The resulting Halifax Group was established to oversee the manufacturing programme, comprising English Electric (who had previously built Handley Page Hampdens), various firms within the London Aircraft Production Group, Fairey Aviation, and Rootes Motors. Because of this scheme, Halifaxes were manufactured at sites across the British isles.

The Halifax was produced in large numbers during the war and over 40%, or 5,129 of the 12,643 heavy bombers produced in Britain between 1940 and 1944 were Halifaxes. In all, 6,167 Halifaxes were built, the last bomber version in April 1945, last cargo in July 1945, last paratroop in November 1946. Peak production of 218 in March 1944. At the peak, 41 separate factories and dispersed units were involved in production, along with 600 subcontractors and 51,000 employees. The first English Electric-built aircraft was flown from Samlesbury on 15 August 1941, officially produced in September, first from London Aircraft Production in January 1942, first from Rootes in March 1942, first from Fairey in August 1942.

The first production standard Halifax, the Mk.I, had a 22 ft (6.7 m) long bomb bay and six wing bomb cells, and could carry a 13,000 lb (5,900 kg) load. Defensive armament consisted of two .303 in (7.70 mm) Browning machine guns in a Boulton Paul Type C nose turret, with an additional four in a Boulton Paul Type E tail turret. Some aircraft included two additional .303 in (7.70 mm) Vickers K machine guns in beam (side, or "waist") positions. Subtle modifications distinguished the Mk.I aircraft. Aircraft of the first batch of fifty Mk.I Halifaxes were designated Mk.I Series I.

A = Paratroop/Glider Tug, C = Cargo. Six Mark I ordered from Handley page were not built, being used as pattern aircraft for the other production lines, 5 mark III ordered from Fairey were not built, being delivered as sets of components.

Factories
Manufacturer	Location	Prototype	I	II	III	A.III	V	VI	VII	A.VII	C.VIII	A.IX	Total
Handley Page	Radlett	2	85	608	324			157	120	45	100	145	1,586
English Electric	Preston			900	900			325	20				2,145
Fairey Aviation	Stockport				320		246		21	69			656
London Aircraft Production Group	Leavesden (Note: The aircraft were assembled at Leavesden from components and assemblies manufactured around London.)			450	260								710
Rootes Securities	Speke			12	250	30	658			120			1,070
Total		2	85	1,970	2,054	30	904	482	161	234	100	145	6,167

=== Improvements ===
Handley Page were initially disappointed with the performance of the Halifax which was below their predictions, much of this was because they had under-estimated the aircraft's drag. The Mk.III Halifax had a wider span of 103 ft 8 in (31.60 m) and had significantly improved performance. Arguably the Merlin engine did not suit the Halifax as much as the Hercules (fitted from the Mk.III on) which suited the Halifax better both aerodynamically and in power.

The Halifax Mk.I was quickly followed by 25 of the Mk.I Series II; these featured an increased gross weight from 58,000 lb (26 t) to 60,000 lb (27 t) but with maximum landing weight unchanged at 50,000 lb (23 t). The Halifax Mk.I Series III featured increased fuel capacity (1,882 imp gal (8,560 L; 2,260 US gal) and larger oil coolers, the latter of which having been adopted in order to accommodate the Merlin XX engine. A dorsally-mounted two-gun Boulton Paul Type C turret replaced the beam guns.

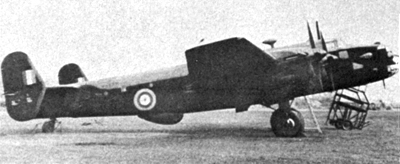
Halifax B Mk.II Srs I, serial V9977, in-which the first H2S radar was installed; note the early triangular fins. This aircraft crashed in June 1942 as a result of an engine fire. All on board were killed, including the electronic engineer Alan Blumlein.

AVIA 46/112 and the pilot notes indicate the increase to 1,882 gallons came in the mark II, along with a dorsal turret and Merlin XX engines.

Introduction of 1,390 hp (1,040 kW) Merlin XX engines and a twin .303 in (7.7 mm) dorsal turret instead of waist guns resulted in the Halifax B Mk.II Series I. The Mk.II Series I (Special) achieved improved performance via the removal of the nose and dorsal turrets. The definition of Halifax II/V Series Ia is new radiators fitted, Gallay changed to Morris. Mark II/V changes from late 1942 into 1943, use of Merlin 22 as well as Merlin XX engines, transparent moulded Perspex nose (this nose became standard upon future Halifax variants), in place of front turret, new, lower, 4 gun Boulton Paul Type A dorsal turret similar to that used in the Boulton Paul Defiant, lowered astrodome and rectangular fins, these changes were often retrofitted and the 5 production lines changed over at different times. Mark II were used in the Middle East and by Coastal Command.

The rudder overbalance / directional instability with engine(s) out problem was alleviated with the fitting of a larger D type fin (40% bigger) and modified rudder. The Mk.III Halifax had satisfactory stability in all axes and was more stable in a dive than a Lancaster. A Lancaster tended to go deeper into a dive whereas a Halifax had to be forced to stay in the dive as the speed increased, i.e. it naturally flew out of a dive.

Owing to a shortage of Messier-built landing gear and hydraulics, Dowty-built landing gear were used on some aircraft instead. As it was incompatible with the Messier equipment, this led to these Halifax bombers being given new designations: a Mark II built with Dowty gear was the Mark V. The use of castings rather than forgings in the Dowty undercarriage had resulted in an increased production rate but had also led to a reduced landing weight of 40,000 lb (18,000 kg). The Halifax Mark V were manufactured by Rootes Group at Speke and Fairey at Stockport; operationally, these were generally used by Coastal Command weather reconnaissance units, Bomber Command and for training purposes. Some 904 had been built when Mark V production ended in July 1944, compared to 1,970 Halifax Mk.IIs.

The most numerous Halifax variant was the much improved B Mk.III of which 2,054 were built. plus 30 A.III. First appearing in August 1943, the Mk.III featured the Perspex nose and modified tail of the Mk.II Series IA but replaced the Merlin with the more powerful 1,650 hp (1,230 kW) Bristol Hercules XVI radial engine. Other changes included the adoption of de Havilland Hydromatic propellers and a wider wing span with rounded wing tips. With the coming of the Mk.III the Halifax's performance finally matched that of the Lancaster though the latter had a larger bomb load and could take larger bombs. The B.VI Halifax's performance improved still further with a cruising speed of 265 mph (426 km/h) and a maximum speed (in 'Full Speed' supercharger mode) of 309 mph (497 km/h) at 19,500 ft (5,900 m). Halifax crews, though admittedly not unbiased, considered the Mk.III Halifax to be the equal of any other bomber, including the Lancaster, and further improved versions (with more powerful Hercules engines) to be superior to all. The improvement in the Halifax Mk.III's performance could be measured objectively. In 1943 4 Group's Halifax squadrons flew 11,607 sorties for a loss of 485 aircraft, a loss rate of 4.2%. Halifax Mk.III production started in early Autumn 1943 and for 1944, when the Mk.III constituted an increasing percentage of the Halifax force, 4 Group flew 25,454 sorties for a loss of 402 aircraft, a loss rate of 1.6%. AIR 22/203 For night bomber raids on Germany in 1943 the Halifax loss plus write off rate was 5.5%, dropping an average of 5,635 pounds of bombs, the Lancaster figures were 3.7% and 9,070 pounds. For 1944 the Halifax was 3.3%, 7,140 pounds, Lancaster 3.3% and 10,020 pounds. The increasing losses of the Merlin versions (mark II and V) lead to them being removed from operations against Germany after the Leipzig raid of 19/20 February 1944. Mark III were two thirds of Bomber Command strength on 1 March 1944, the final mark II departed the operational units in mid July 1944.

The Halifax B Mk.IV was a converted B Mk.II non-production design using the Rolls-Royce Merlin 65 engine with a two-stage supercharger and a four-bladed propeller fitted. This resulted in an increase in top speed by 60 mph (97 km/h) to 324 mph (521 km/h) at 19,000 ft (5,800 m). Due to a shortage of Merlins with two-stage superchargers production of the B Mk.IV was not proceeded with.

The definitive version of the Halifax was the B Mk.VI, powered by the 1,800 hp (1,300 kW) Hercules 100. The final bomber version, the Mk.VII, reverted to the less powerful Hercules XVI. However, these variants were produced in relatively small quantities.

The remaining variants were the Halifax C Mk.VIII, an unarmed transport that was fitted with an 8,000 lb (3,600 kg) cargo pannier instead of a bomb bay, which could accommodate a maximum of 11 passengers and the Mk A IX paratroop transport, which had space for up to 16 paratroopers and their equipment. A transport/cargo version of the Halifax was also produced, known as the Handley Page Halton.

== Design ==
=== Overview ===
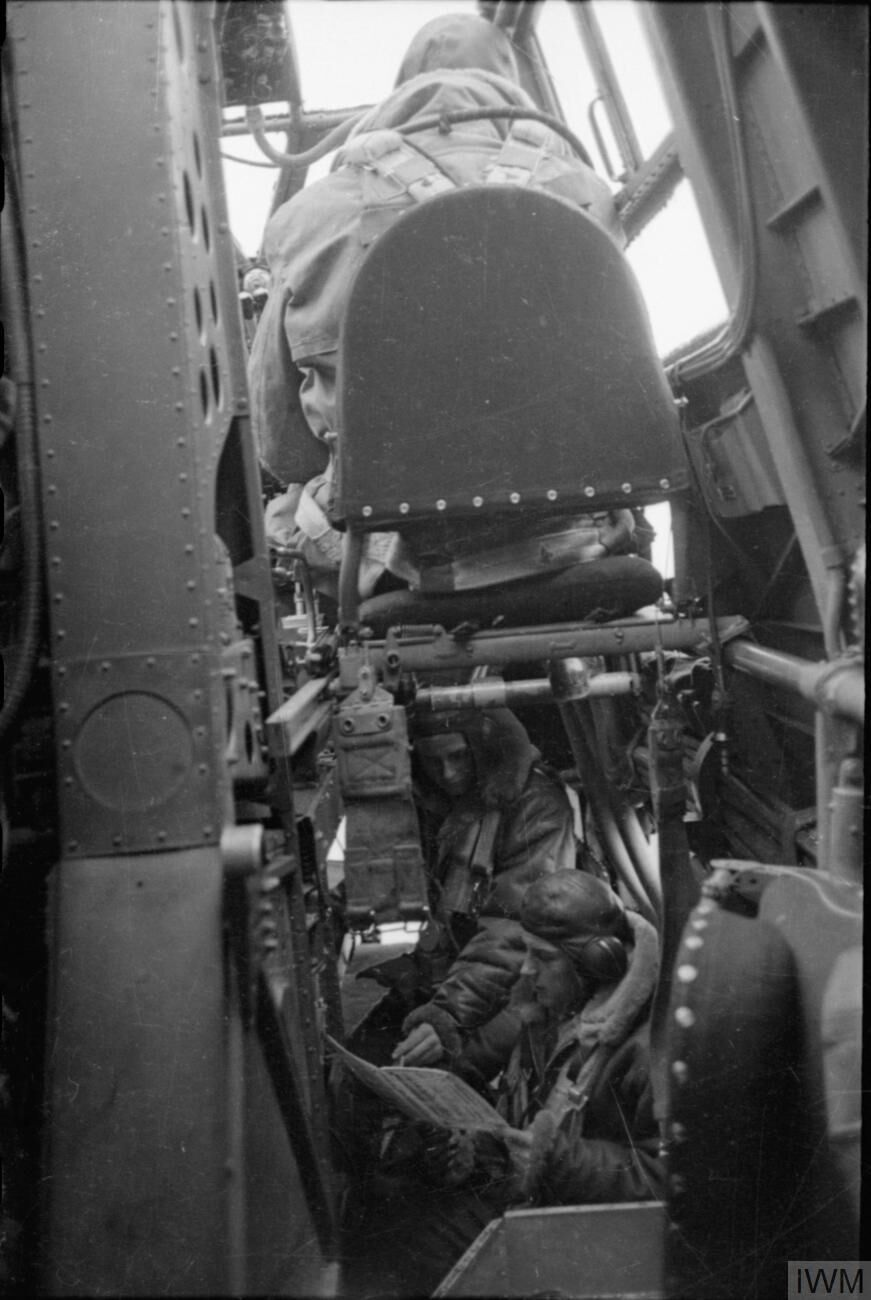
Halifax B Mk.II Series 1: flight engineer on the fold-down seat next to the pilot, ready to assist with the throttles for takeoff, with front gunner and navigator seen below.

The Handley Page Halifax was a mostly orthodox design, a mid-wing monoplane with a tail unit featuring twin fins and rudders. The Halifax featured all-metal construction with a smooth, stressed skin covering the majority of the exterior surfaces; the flight control surfaces were an exception, being fabric-covered]. The slab-sided fuselage contained a 22-foot bomb bay, with the majority of the bomb load, while the cockpit was flush with the upper fuselage.

The Halifax was powered by four engines, two on each wing. Early production Halifax bombers were powered by the Rolls-Royce Merlin; later aircraft had the larger Bristol Hercules radial engine. To contain and attach the engines to the airframe, Handley Page developed a design for the power egg instead of using the typical, slimmer Rolls-Royce counterpart; despite generating increased drag, this in-house design was readily adaptable to the alternative Hercules engine on later aircraft.

Each engine drove a Rotol compressed wood constant-speed propeller, enabling the Halifax B.I to attain a maximum speed of 265 mph (426 km/h) at 17,500 ft (5,300 m). With a typical load of 5,800 lb (2,600 kg) of bombs and 2,242 imp gal (10,190 L; 2,693 US gal) of fuel, it had a range of 1,860 mi (2,990 km). The defensive armament included power-assisted gun turrets in various positions on the aircraft. Different models of the Halifax used different numbers and combinations of turrets, trading speed for firepower and vice versa.

=== Crew positions and armament ===
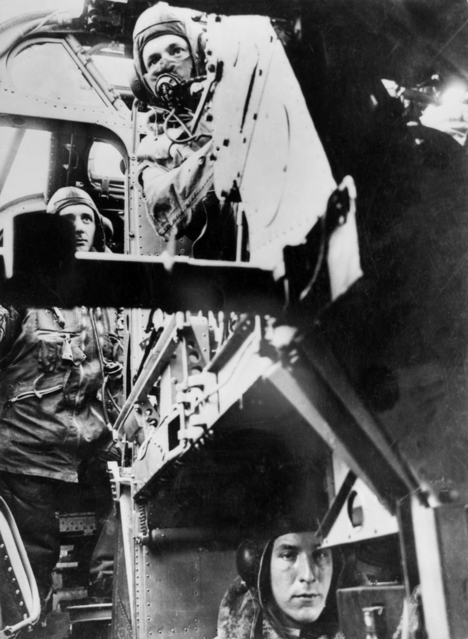
Looking upward and rearward from the navigator's position : wireless operator at lower right; pilot at upper right; flight engineer in his usual inflight position at upper left behind the pilot

The bomb-aimer's position was in the extreme nose with the navigator's table located behind it, the bomb-aimer also served as the front gunner. Above the navigator's position was the forward gun turret. The wireless (radio) operator was behind the navigator, separated by a half-width partition. On the floor just behind the front turret (or later the nose) was the escape hatch. This was 24 in × 26.5 in (610 mm × 670 mm), the same size as the Stirling and slightly larger than the 22 in × 26.5 in (560 mm × 670 mm) for the Lancaster. On average, 25 percent of Halifax and Stirling crews bailed out from a damaged aeroplane, but only 15 per cent did so from Lancasters.

The pilot sat on the left side in the cockpit above the wireless operator. The flight engineer filled in as a co-pilot, seated on a folding seat to the right of the pilot during crucial manoeuvres such as take-off. Aft of the pilot and set lower than him was the flight engineer's compartment with controls on the bulkhead. Another compartment aft of the flight engineer contained two bunks, originally intended for resting crew members but almost always used for treating and berthing injured crew. This area led to the two-gun dorsal turret. The tail gunner occupied a four-gun turret at the end of the aircraft.

Starting from early 1943 the nose turret was deleted; instead the bomb-aimer occupied a streamlined perspex nose containing a single hand-held machine gun. On later-built aircraft, the two-gun dorsal turret was replaced by a four-gun Boulton Paul turret. The maximum bomb load was 14,500 lb (6,600 kg), which was primarily carried in a bomb bay housed within the fuselage, divided into six bomb compartments, with three bomb compartments in the inboard sections of each wing; this division of the load between compartments limited the maximum size of the bombs which could be enclosed to 2,000 lb (910 kg); when carrying the Blockbuster bomb of 4,000 lb (1,800 kg) and 8,000 lb (3,600 kg) high capacity (HC) bombs the bomb bay doors could not close fully.

== Operational service ==
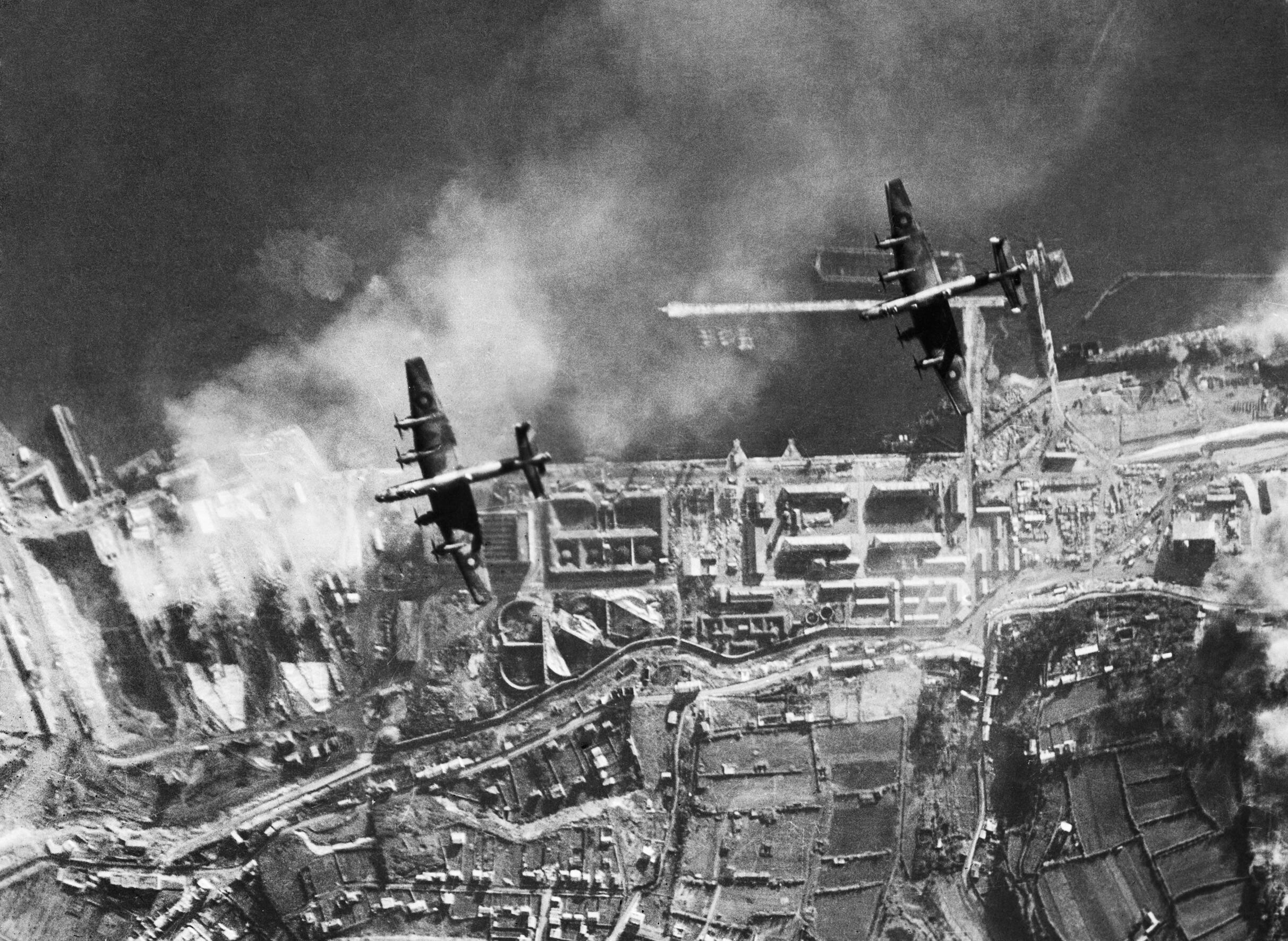
Halifaxes of No. 35 Squadron bombing the German battleships Scharnhorst and Gneisenau at left in dry dock at Brest, France, 18 December 1941. 'Prinz Eugen' is moored at far right.

In November 1940, the Handley Page Halifax entered service with No. 35 Squadron at RAF Linton-on-Ouse. Its operational debut occurred on the night of 10/11 March 1941, when six Halifax bombers flew a bombing raid against Le Havre, targeting the area around the docks and shipping that might be present. The existence of the Halifax was not officially acknowledged until July 1941, after it was used in a daylight attack on La Pallice, France, against Scharnhorst. At the end of 1941, the Halifax was withdrawn from daylight bombing operations after intensifying fighter opposition had increased casualties to unsustainable levels.

In the second half of 1942, No. 35 Squadron and four other squadrons were selected to form the Pathfinder Force, later expanded to become No. 8 Group. Pathfinder crews flying the Halifax would mark routes and identify and mark targets for the Main Force. Marking greatly increased the accuracy and destructive power of Bomber Command. As a Pathfinder and Main Force aircraft, the Halifax was a fundamental part of the bombing offensive against Germany and its Axis allies.

By the end of 1943, No. 4 Group had been equipped with the Halifax, and would continue to operate the aircraft until the end of the war. No. 6 Group, formed of Royal Canadian Air Force (RCAF) squadrons, also adopted the Halifax around the same time, and would go on to operate it in each of its 14 squadrons, although it was never solely equipped with the type. At its peak strength, Bomber Command operated 25 Halifax squadrons.

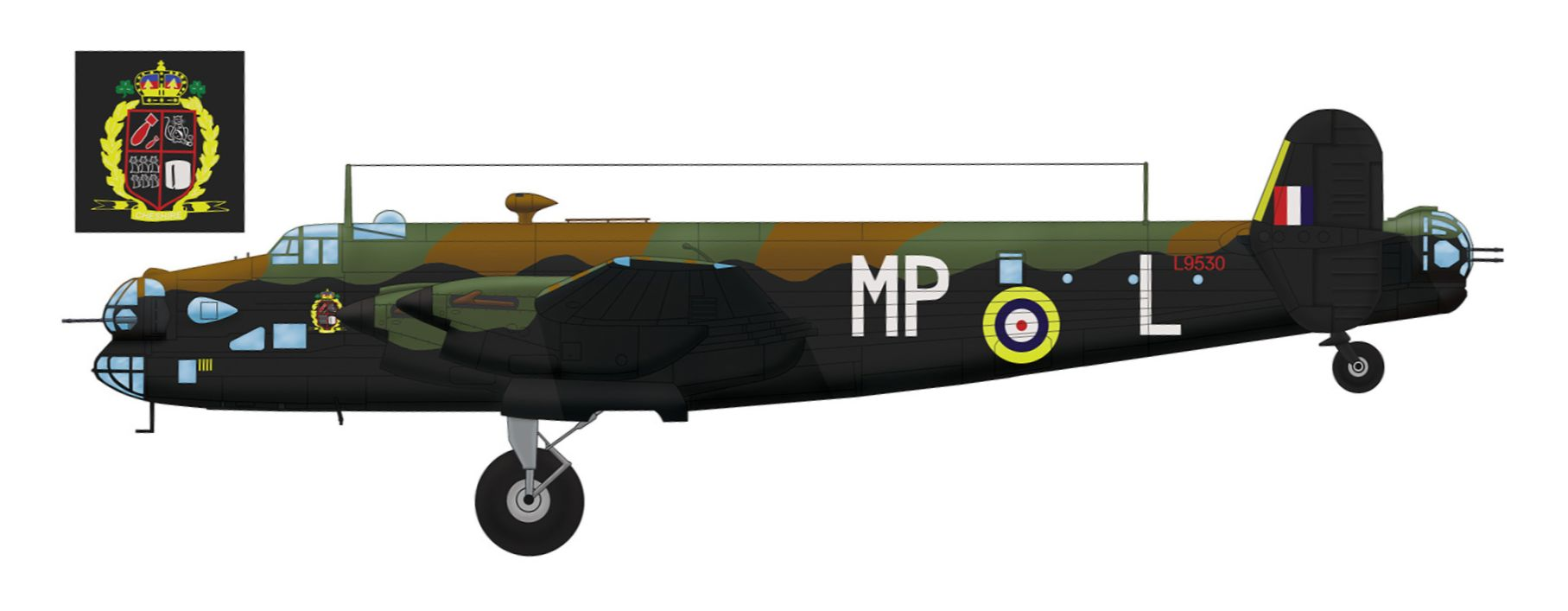
Handley Page Halifax B Mk.I, s/n L9530, MP-L of No. 76 Squadron RAF, Summer 1941

While the early-built models of the Halifax were much used by Bomber Command and made valuable contributions to operations, the aircraft's performance was considered unsatisfactory for the most part, mainly due to the underpowered Merlin engine, which meant that it could not fly at the higher altitudes needed to avoid night fighters, which were becoming increasingly effective in 1943. This was answered by the Halifax Mk.III, which was powered by Bristol Hercules radial engines in place of the Merlins. Introduced into service in November 1943, the Mk.III was first delivered to No. 433 Squadron and No. 466 Squadron. By January 1944, the Hercules-powered Halifax was available in quantity and quickly proved to have superior performance in the face of German fighter defences.

Early on, Air Chief Marshal Arthur Harris, head of Bomber Command, was scathing in his criticism of the Halifax's performance in comparison to the new Avro Lancaster, primarily of its bomb-carrying capability. An average Halifax was calculated to drop 100 long tons (100 t) of bombs in its lifetime, compared to a Lancaster's 154 long tons (156 t). Harris continued to have a low opinion of the Halifax, despite the fact that later Hercules-engined machines had lower loss rates and higher crew survival rates after abandoning the aircraft than Lancasters, and came very close to the Lancaster's speed and altitude performance. The Halifax was progressively outnumbered in front-line service over occupied Europe as more Lancasters became available from 1943; many squadrons converted to the Lancaster. (Note: The first "Thousand bomber raid" on Cologne on 30–31 May 1942 included 131 Halifaxes and 73 Lancasters; The attack on Berlin on 28 February 1943 included 252 Halifaxes and 457 Lancasters; The attack on Hamburg on 27/28 July 1943 included 244 Halifaxes, 353 Lancasters, 116 Stirlings and 74 Wellingtons; The attack on Nuremberg on 30–31 March 1944 included 214 Halifaxes and 572 Lancasters; The attack on Dresden on 13/14 February 1945 included 753 Lancasters and no Halifaxes with nine Mosquitoes marking.)

Production of the Halifax continued, supposedly because it was more efficient to keep building it than to stop its production and convert to building another aircraft but new facilities were devoted to the Lancaster.

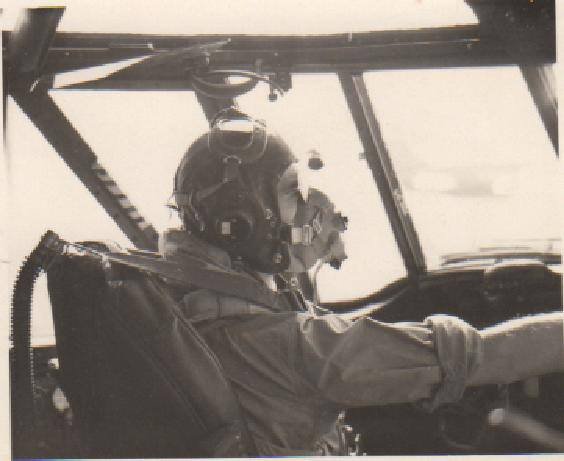
A Halifax pilot

Harris's view of the Halifax changed sometime after spring 1942. On 2 June 1942, in a response to a telegram sent by Frederick Handley Page, congratulating Harris on the success of the first 1000 bomber raid on cologne, he stated: "My Dear Handley Page. We much appreciate your telegram of congratulation on Saturday night's work, the success of which was very largely due to your support in giving us such a powerful weapon to wield. Between us we will make a job of it".

Following the invasion of France in 1944, the Halifax resumed daylight bombing operations, performing semi-tactical strikes upon enemy troop concentrations, gun emplacements and strongpoints of the Atlantic Wall defences along the French coast, with a reportedly high degree of accuracy. Other common targets were German communications and the launch sites for V-1 flying bombs. Bombing activity became increasingly brazen throughout late 1944 as the Luftwaffe lost air superiority against the Allied air forces. The Halifax was increasingly used for transport duties around this time; in one instance, around half a million gallons of petrol was delivered to Brussels in support of the advancing Second Army, then engaged in the fighting at Arnhem.

During the latter half of 1944, the bombing of German-held oil facilities became a priority of the offensive. On 27 August, a force of 216 Halifax bombers, with smaller numbers of de Havilland Mosquitos and Lancasters and a sizable escort of Supermarine Spitfires, conducted the first big daylight operation by Bomber Command against a target inside Germany that year, attacking the oil refinery at Homberg on the Ruhr. In spite of heavy fire from anti-aircraft guns, no bombers were shot down and the refinery was severely damaged in places. Attacks upon oil production facilities throughout Germany became commonplace in the remaining months of the war.

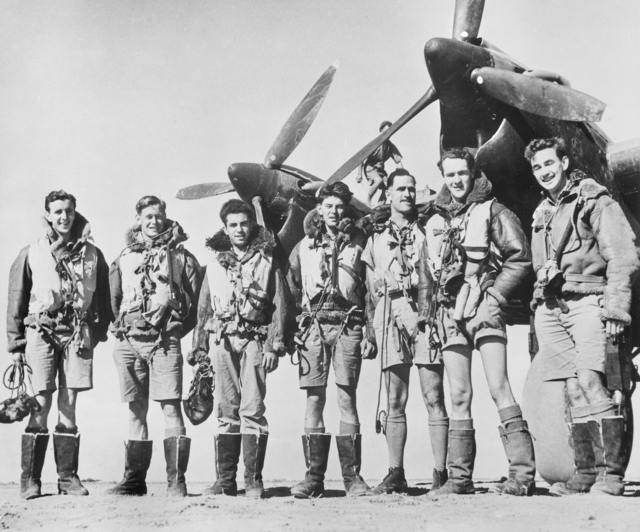
Personnel of No. 462 Squadron operating in RAF Middle East Command, September 1942

The only Victoria Cross to be awarded to a Halifax pilot went to Cyril J. Barton of No. 578 Squadron for displaying great gallantry in bringing his damaged aircraft back after a raid on Nuremberg on the night of 30/31 March 1944. Barton continued to fly the Halifax while other crew members bailed out. He was killed crash-landing but the remaining crew survived due to his actions.

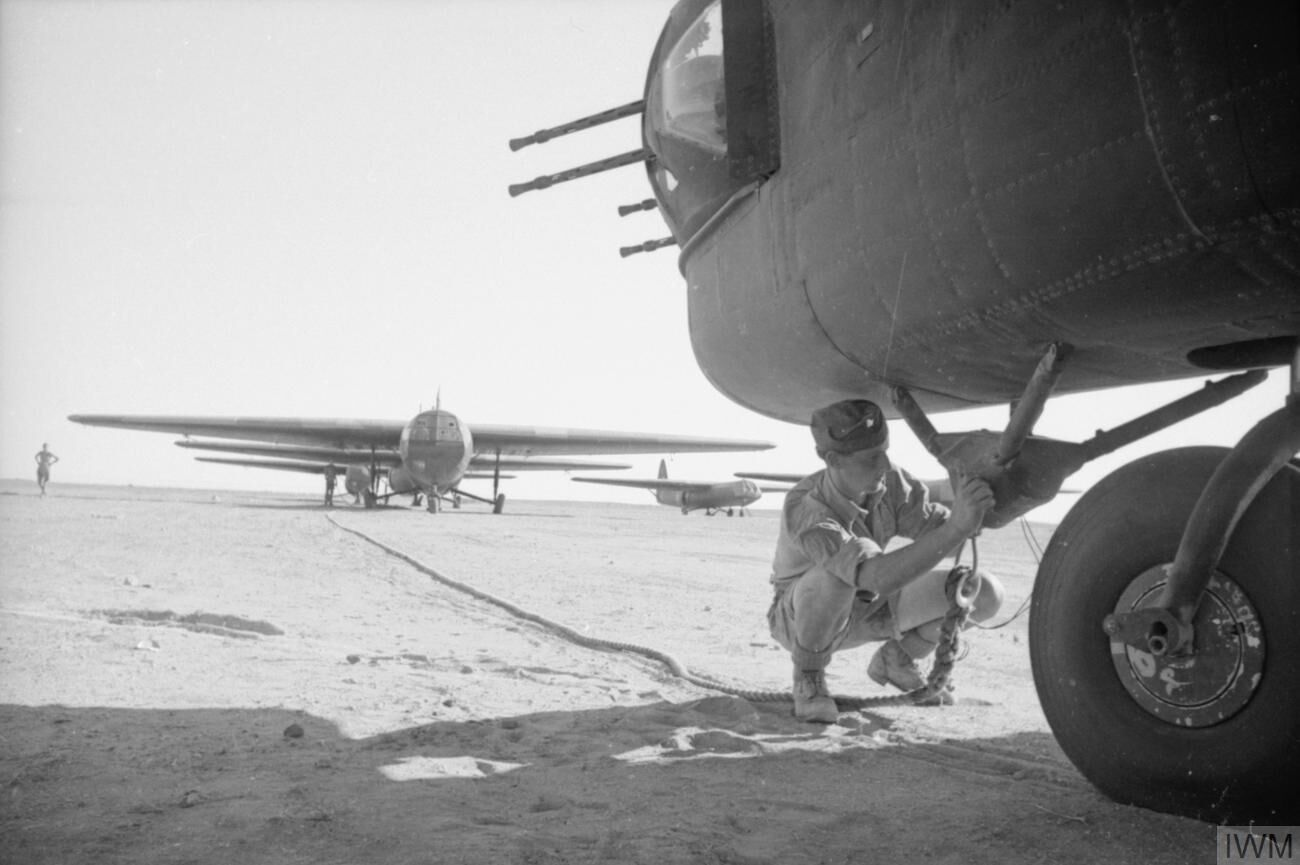
RAF airman attaches the tow rope of an Airspeed Horsa glider to the tow hook of a Halifax glider tug, of 295 Squadron, in preparation for Operation Fustian, Tunisia (July 1943)

Large numbers of Halifax bombers were operated by Coastal Command, which used it to conduct anti submarine warfare, reconnaissance and meteorological operations. The Halifax was used to deploy mines in the vicinity of Axis-held ports. It served increasingly in other support capacities, being used as a glider tug, an electronic warfare aircraft for No. 100 Group and to conduct special operations, such as parachuting agents and arms into occupied Europe, for the Special Operations Executive (SOE). As a glider tug, the Halifax was superior to the Lancaster, the Halifax Mk.III's 59,400 lb (26,900 kg) "tug weight at take off" was higher than a Lancaster Mk.II's 52,800 lb (23,900 kg).

In early 1945, the Halifax was frequently dispatched against cities in Germany, including Hannover, Magdeburg, Stuttgart, Cologne, Münster, Osnabrück. Infrastructure such as oil facilities and railways were given priority; these targets were attacked until the end of the war. According to Moyes, within the final few months, bomber losses had fallen to all-time lows while raids were frequently regarded as having been highly successful. The improved Halifax Mk.VI and Mk.VII were introduced and these models had been 'tropicalised' with an eye towards their use in the Pacific War against the Empire of Japan. While some Mk.VI and Mk.VII machines were deployed to the theatre, they played little meaningful role as the war ended before larger numbers could be brought to bear against Japan.

On 25 April 1945, the Halifax performed its last big operation against the enemy in WWII during an attack upon coastal gun batteries on Wangerooge in the Frisian Islands of the North Sea. While the type continued to fly operations after this, these were mainly diversions for other operations and sporadic, uncoordinated attacks against targets of opportunity. Upon the end of the conflict, Bomber Command quickly disbanded the majority of its Halifax squadrons and the aircraft transferred to Transport Command. During the type's service with Bomber Command, Halifaxes flew 82,773 operations and dropped 224,207 tons of bombs and 1,833 aircraft were lost.

By 1947, the majority of Halifax bombers were deemed to be surplus and scrapped. The Halifax remained in widespread service with Coastal Command and RAF Transport Command, Royal Egyptian Air Force and the Armée de l'Air until early 1952.

The Royal Pakistan Air Force continued operating the type until 1961, thus Pakistan became the last military user of the type. In 1947, the RPAF inherited two Halifax bombers from the RAF which were later extensively used during the 1st Kashmir War in 1948. RPAF Halifaxes flew several sorties in support of Pakistani and Kashmiri forces (notably in the Battle of Skardu) during which they conducted night Airdrop missions. After the war, six ex-RAF Halifax-BVIs were purchased in 1949. Due to their high operational costs, the RPAF Commanders decided not to enlarge the Halifax fleet too much. These aircraft were later transferred to the new No. 12 Squadron PAF, where they were only used in emergencies. Gradually, they were transferred to long-term storage and were later scrapped.

In September 1997, Halifax 57 Rescue of Canada excavated Halifax LW682 from a bog near the River Dender in Belgium. The aircraft was part of 426 Squadron RCAF and had been shot down near Geraardsbergen during a raid on Leuven, Belgium on 12 May 1944. During the excavation, the bodies of three crew members were recovered and later given proper burial. Several items from the plane were used in restoration of NA337, while other items were transferred to museums. The airframe was melted and used to construct the ceiling of the RAF Bomber Command Memorial in London, which was unveiled in 2012.

=== Civilian operation ===
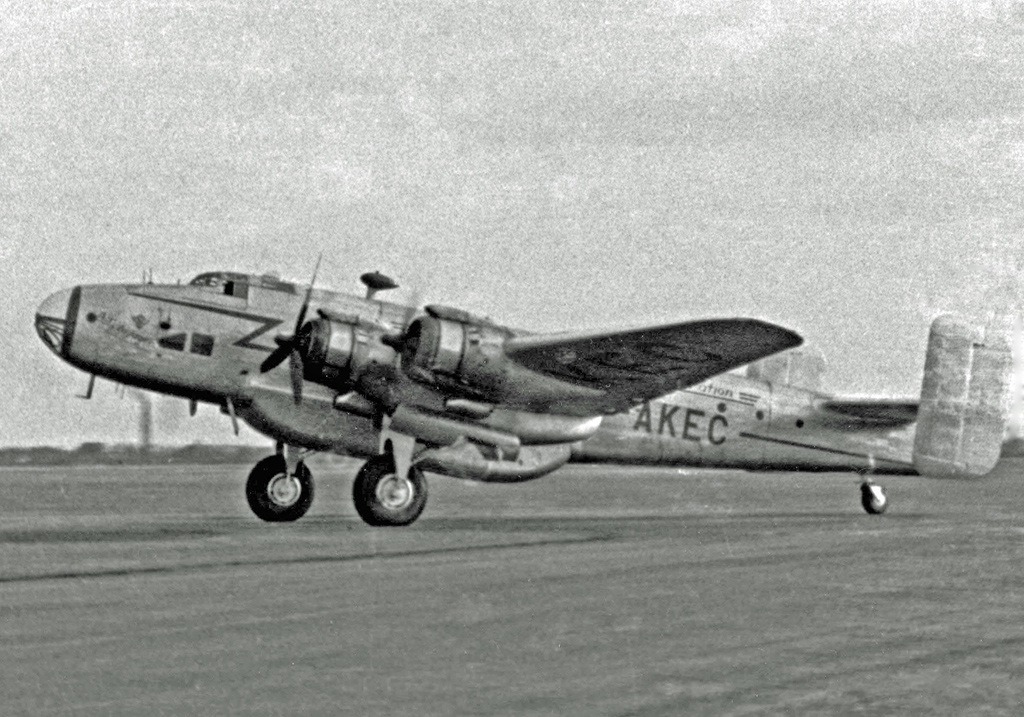
Halifax C.8 freighter of Lancashire Aircraft Corporation at Manchester Airport in 1950

A number of former RAF Halifax C.8s were sold from 1945 and used as freighters by mostly British airlines. In 1948, 41 civilian Halifax freighters were used during the Berlin Air Lift, operating 4,653 sorties carrying freight and 3,509 carrying bulk diesel fuel. Nine aircraft were lost during the airlift. The low-cost airline business pioneer Freddie Laker bought and serviced war-surplus Halifaxes for Bond Air Services operations in the Berlin airlift. With the airfreight market in decline, most of the civilian Halifaxes were scrapped on their return to England. The last civilian-operated Halifaxes were withdrawn from service in late 1952.

== Variants ==
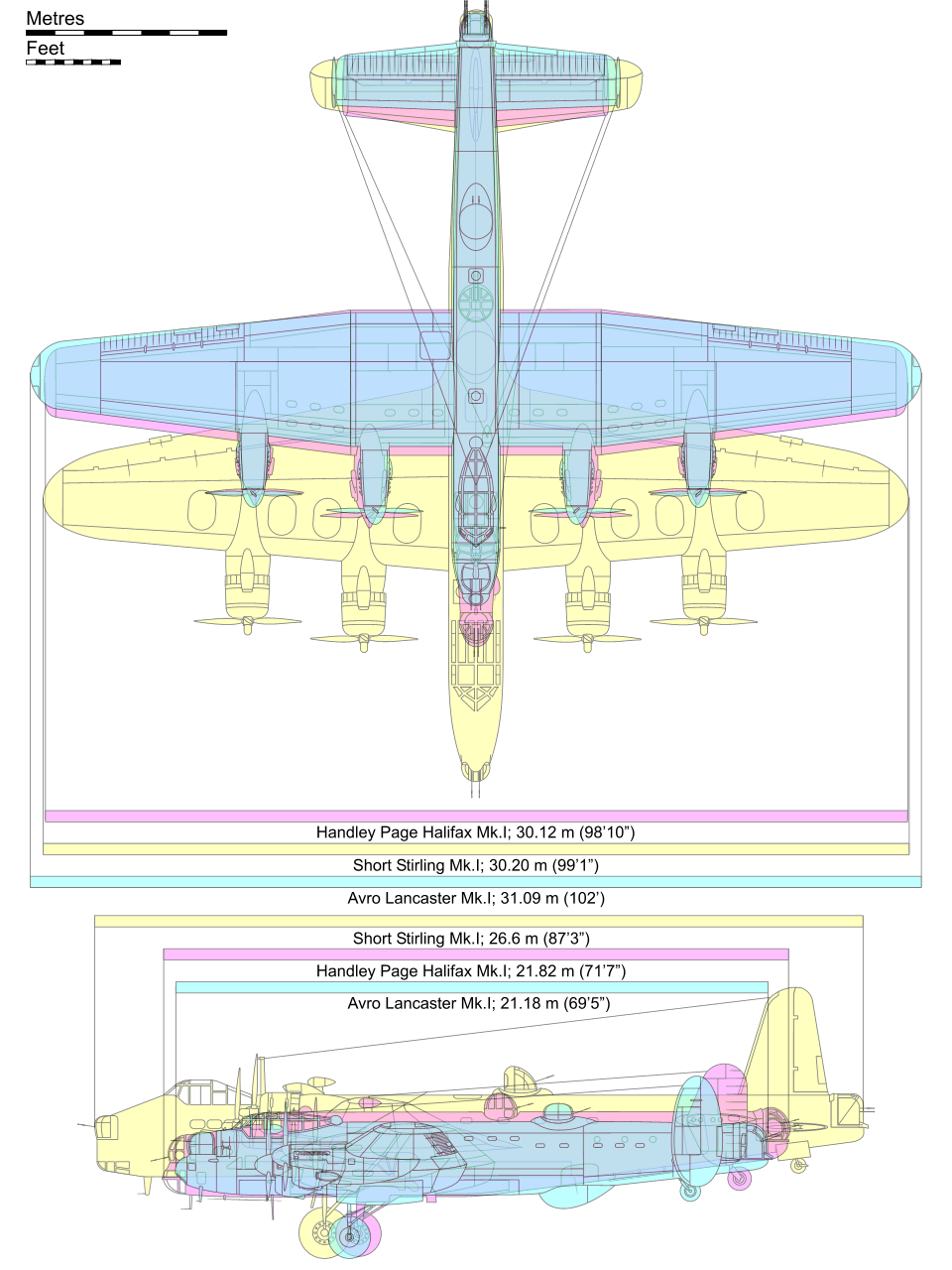
Comparison of the Halifax Mk.I (pink) with its contemporaries, the Short Stirling (yellow) and the Avro Lancaster (blue)

=== Pre-Halifax designs ===
H.P.55
Proposed twin-engine bomber aircraft, never built.
H.P.56
Proposed twin-engine bomber aircraft, fitted with two Rolls-Royce Vulture engines, never built.

=== H.P.57 ===
H.P.57
L7244 – Prototype first flew on The first Halifax prototype with four Merlin 10 engines and no armament.
L7245 – Second prototype first flew from Radlett on 17 August 1940 and was more representative of the production configuration including armament.

Halifax B.I Series I

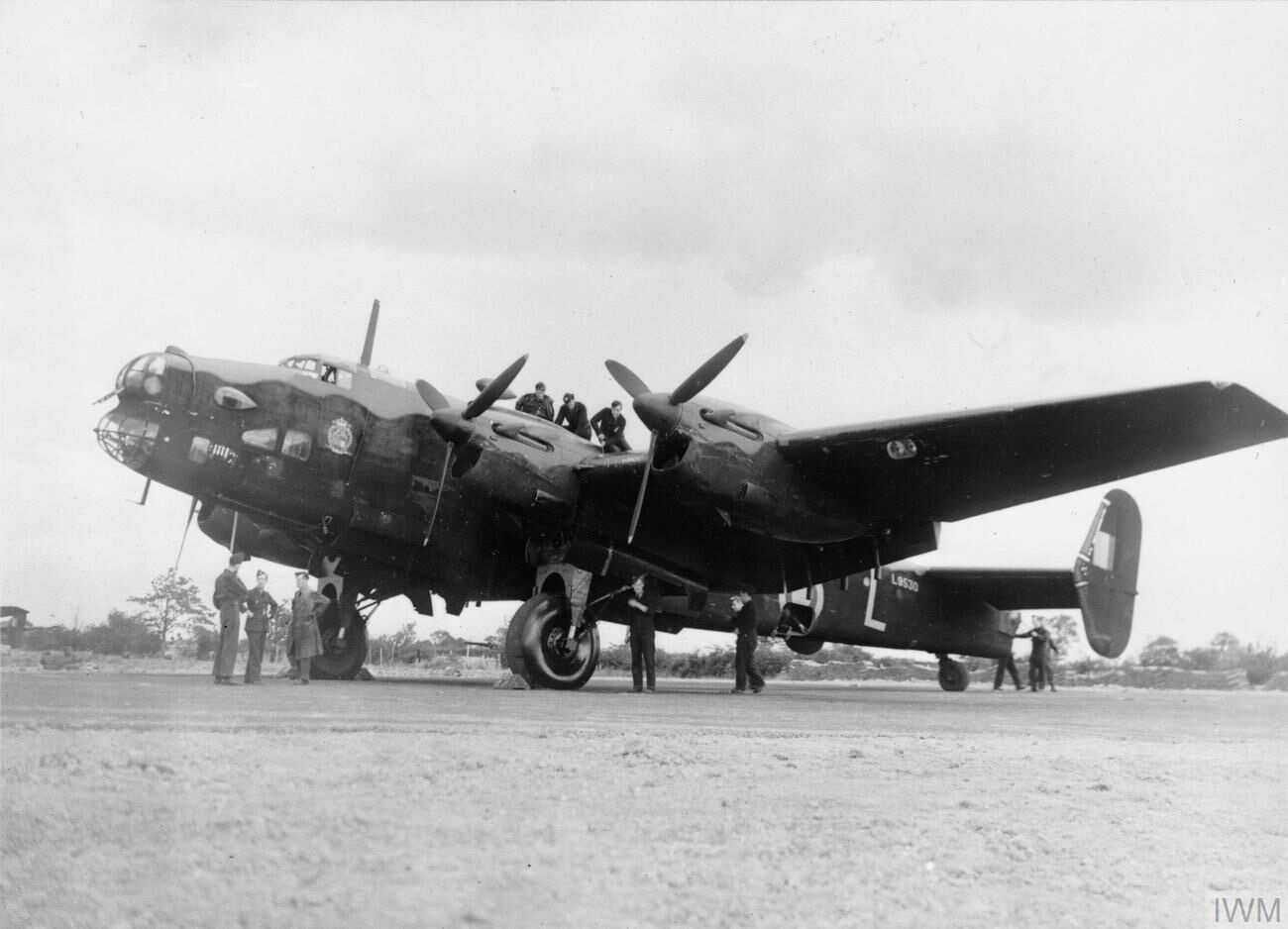
A Halifax B Mark I Series I of No. 76 Squadron undergoing maintenance at RAF Middleton St George, County Durham

Four-engined long-range heavy-bomber aircraft powered by Rolls-Royce Merlin X engines; the first production version. Armament consisted of nose turret with two guns, tail turret with four guns and two beam guns. Recognizable from large deep radiator intakes containing circular Gallay radiators and oil cooler. 50 produced.

Halifax B.I Series II

Stressed for operating at a higher gross weight. 25 produced.

Halifax B.I Series III

Re-engined with Merlin XX engines with slimmer coolers, introduced new twin-gun Boulton Paul type C upper turret in place of beam guns, with revised undercarriage and additional centre-section fuel tanks. 9 produced.

=== H.P.58 ===
Halifax Mk.II
Projected variant with revised armament including 20 mm (0.787 in) cannon and no tail turret. Due to problems with the new armament, the project was cancelled and the Mk.II designation given to H.P.59.

=== H.P.59 ===
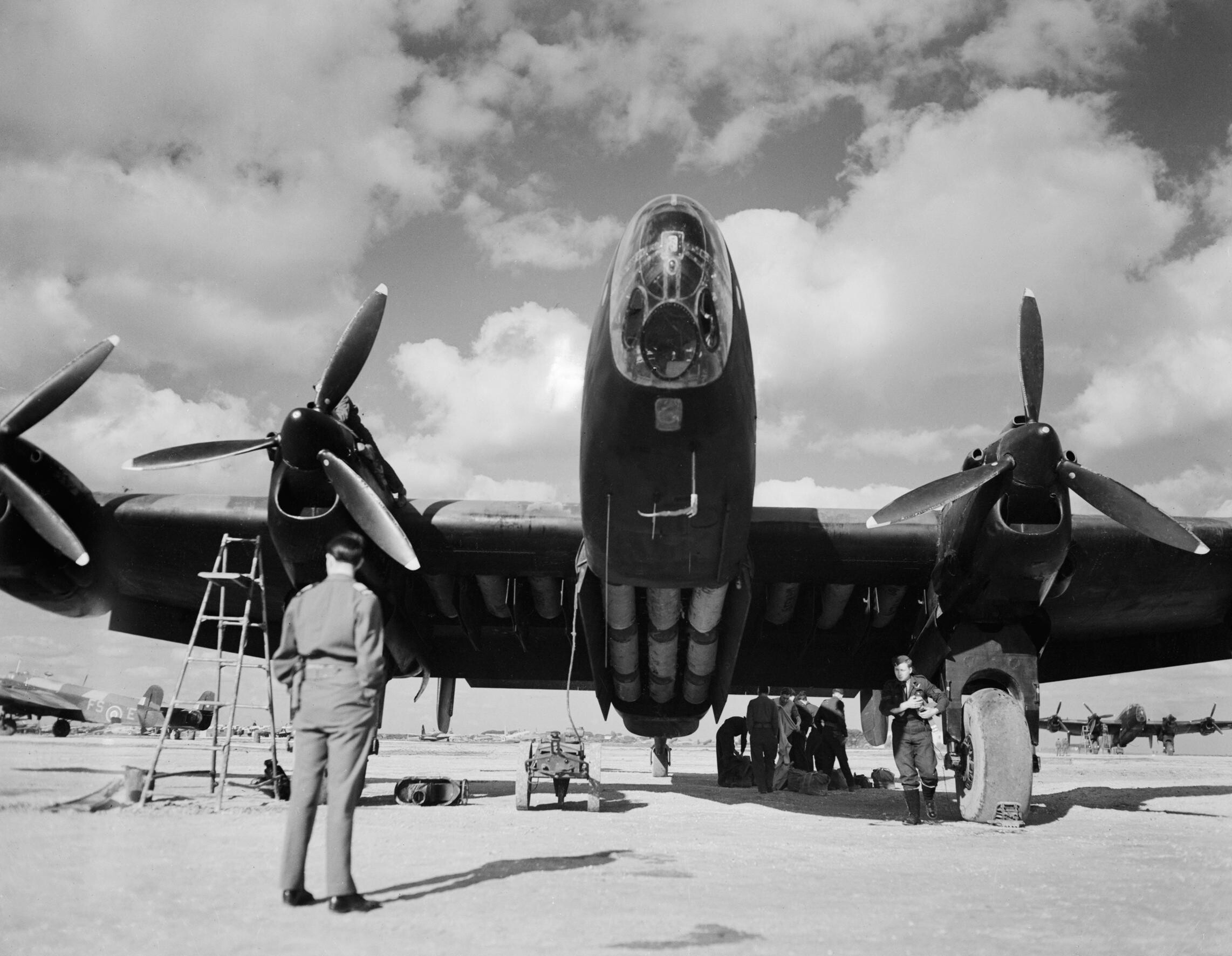
Halifax Mk.II of No. 148 Squadron at Brindisi, Italy. Note the parachute canisters containing supplies for the Yugoslav National Liberation Army loaded into the bomb bay and wing cells

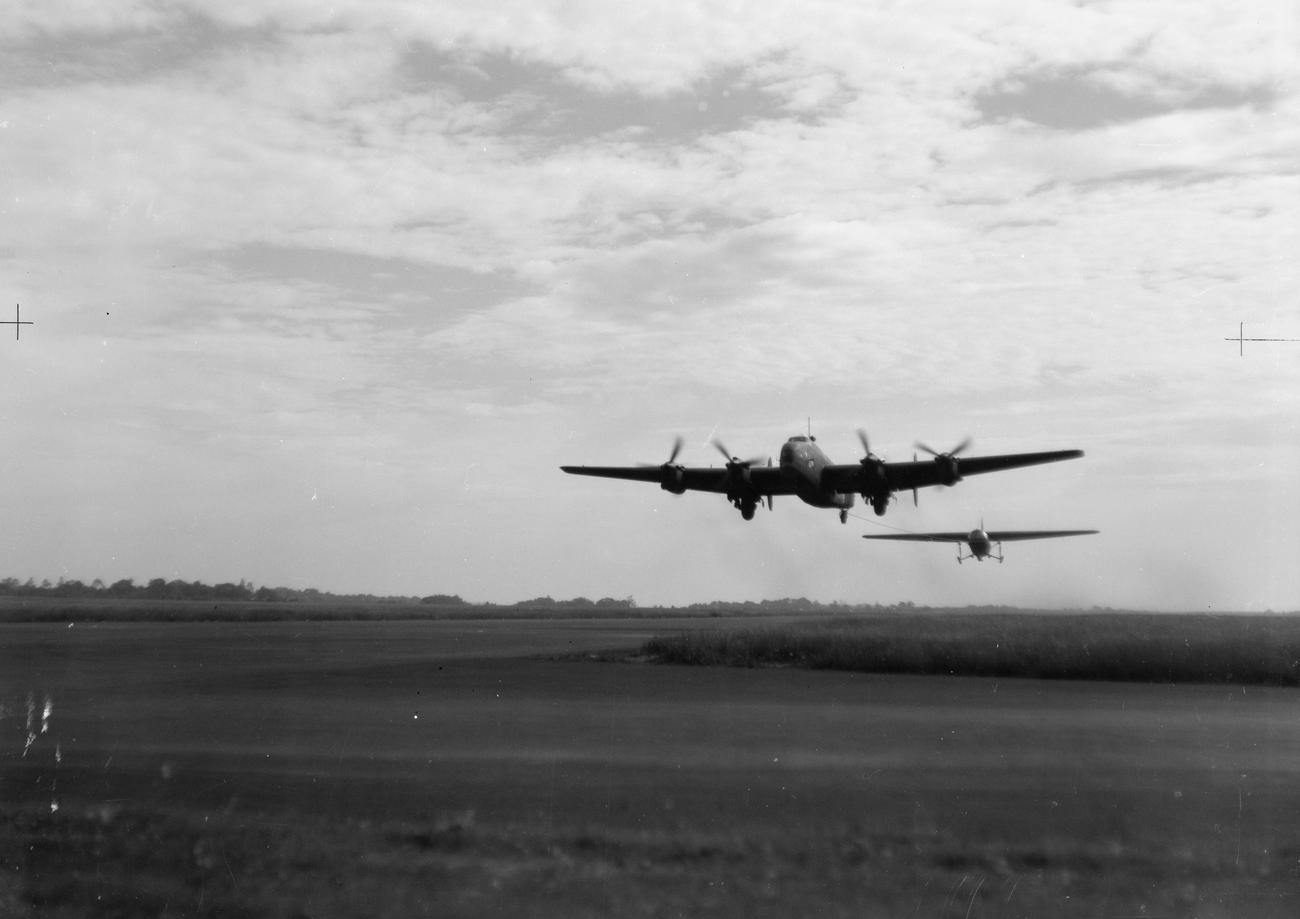
A Halifax A.V Series 1 (Special) glider tug of No. 295 Squadron getting airborne from RAF Portreath, Cornwall, towing an Airspeed Horsa glider to Tunisia during Operation Beggar, June 1943

Halifax Mk.II
New variant with increased takeoff weight, fuel and weapons carriage.
Halifax B.II Series I
First series of the bomber variant; from March 1942 onwards, these were fitted with TR1335 navigation aids.
Halifax B.II Series I (Special), SOE
Special version for Special Operations Executive (SOE) used to drop supplies over Europe. Nose armament and dorsal turret removed, the nose being faired over, as well as changes to the fuel vent pipes and exhaust shrouds.
Halifax B.II Series I (Special)

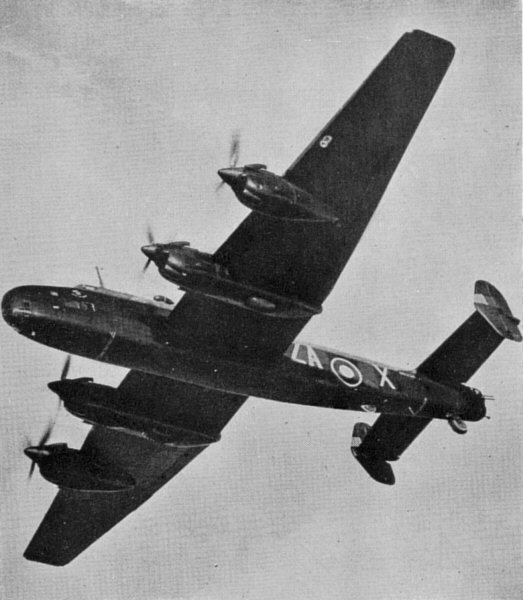
Halifax B.II Series I (Special) W1057, ZA-X, No. 10 Squadron RAF, with a faired-over nose. During April–May 1942, this aircraft took part in a number of raids on the German battleship Tirpitz in Fættenfjord near Trondheim, Norway.

Generally similar to the aircraft used by the SOE, these were employed in the bombing role. These aircraft were more varied in appearance, especially concerning the fitting of dorsal armament with some aircraft retaining the standard Boulton Paul "Type C" turret in different mounts with others mounting a "Type A" turret. There were also examples with no dorsal turret, similar to the SOE-aircraft.
Halifax B.II Series IA
Modified with new glazed nose section, Merlin XX or 22 engines, new square Morris radiators and new "D" fin and rudder. The dorsal turret was changed to a four-gun Boulton Paul Type A Mk.VIII, and there were improvements to the bomb bay door sealing. Some aircraft were fitted with the H2S radar.
Halifax B.II Series I, Freighter
A few Mk.IIs were employed in the transport role in Great Britain (unmodified SOE-aircraft) and in the Middle East (simple modifications to allow carriage of engines or Spitfire fuselages).
Halifax B.II Series II
Single aircraft (HR756) modified with three-blade Rotol propellers and Merlin 22 engines. Rejected in favour of Mk.III.
Halifax A.II
According to some sources, a handful of the airborne forces Halifaxes were converted into B.IIs. If this is true they might have been designated A.II or may have retained their bomber designations.
Halifax GR.II
Coastal Command variant of the Halifax B.II.
Halifax GR.II Series I
A handful of aircraft converted from Series I or Special to GR.II standard, having differences in dorsal armament. The main difference was the fitting of a ASV.Mk 3 radar in an H2S type fairing. Sometimes, a .50 in (12.7 mm) machine gun was fitted in the faired nose.
Halifax GR.II Series IA
Definitive Coastal Command variant of the GR.II with glazed nose mounting .50 in (12.7 mm) machine gun, Merlin XX or 22 engines, B-P A-type dorsal turret and extra long-range fuel tanks in fuselage. A ventral turret with a single .50 in (12.7 mm) machine gun was mounted on most aircraft although some employed the ASV.Mk 3 radar in its place.
Halifax Met.II
Some sources suggest that there were a meteorological variant of the B.II, designated Met.II, but this is unlikely.

=== H.P.61 ===
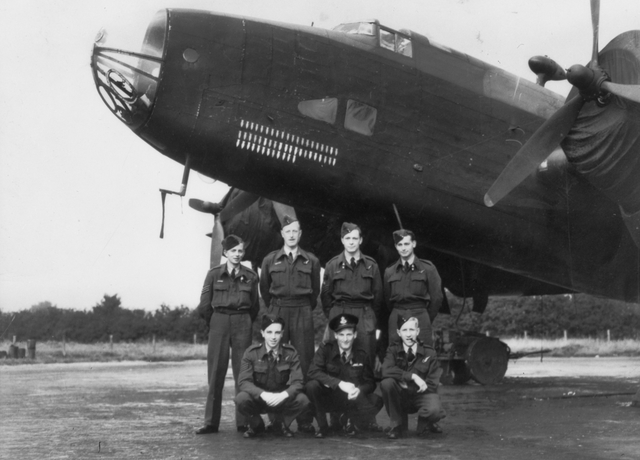
Group portrait of an air crew of No. 578 Squadron in front of a Halifax bomber, circa 1944

Halifax B.III
Main production variant, fitted with Bristol Hercules engines. B.III bombers were fitted with transparent nose dome with single machine gun, Boulton Paul dorsal turret with four guns and tail turret with four guns. All but first few had longer wing with rounded wingtips that increased wingspan to 104 ft 2 in (31.75 m). 2,091 produced.
Halifax A.III
Halifax B.III bombers converted into glider tug and paratroop transport aircraft.
Halifax C.III
Halifax B.III bombers converted into military transport aircraft.

=== H.P.63 ===
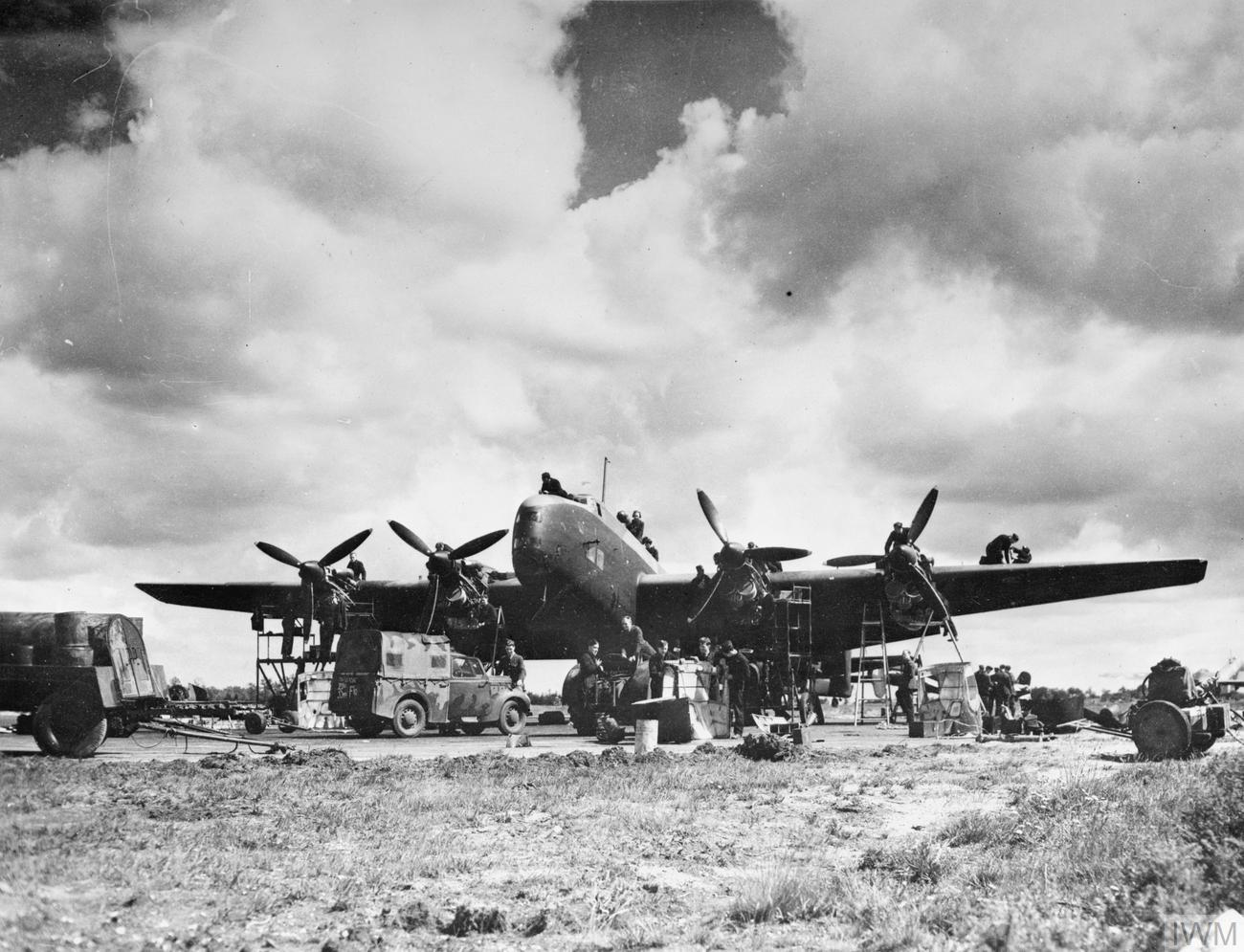
A Halifax B Mark V Series I (Special) of No. 295 Squadron undergoing a 24-hour overhaul at RAF Holmsley South, Hampshire, 1943

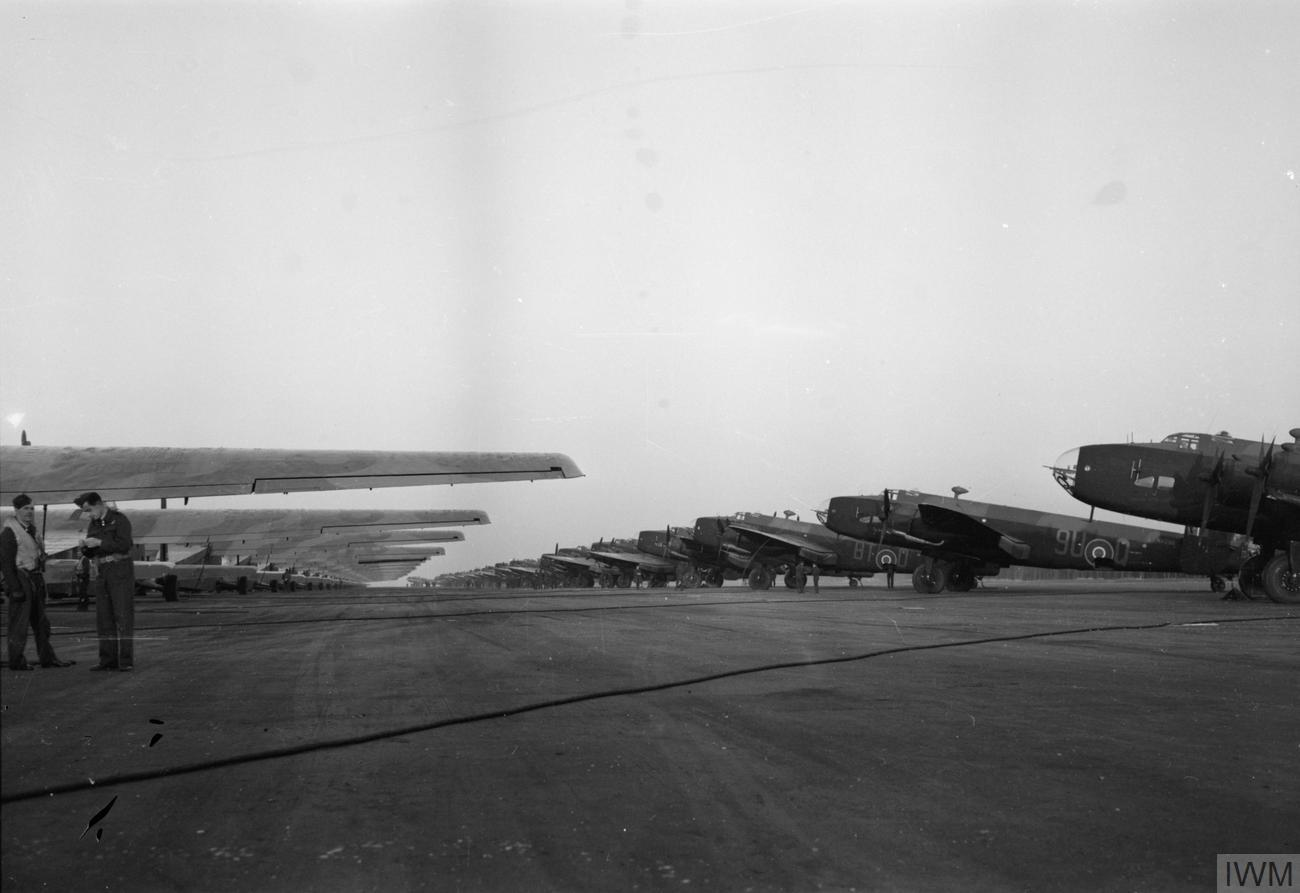
A line of Halifax A Mark VII glider tugs attached to various General Aircraft Hamilcars via tow ropes of No. 298 Squadron and No. 644 Squadron, at RAF Woodbridge, Suffolk, prior to launch

Halifax B.V
Four-engined long-range heavy-bomber, powered by four Rolls-Royce Merlin XX engines with square empennage and wingtips. Armament as B.III. 904 produced.
Halifax B.V Series I (Special)
Halifax A.V
Halifax B.V bombers converted into glider tugs and paratroop transport aircraft.
Halifax GR.V
Coastal Command variant. Halifax B.V bombers converted into maritime reconnaissance aircraft.

Halifax B.VI
Four-engined long-range heavy-bomber, powered by four 1,615 hp (1,204 kW) Bristol Hercules XVI radial engines with H2S radar. No dorsal turret. Square empennage, round wing tips. 643 produced.
Halifax C.VI
Halifax B.VI bombers converted into military transport aircraft.
Halifax GR.VI
Coastal Command variant. Halifax B.VI bombers converted into maritime reconnaissance aircraft.

Halifax B.VII
Four-engined long-range heavy-bomber, powered by four 1,615 hp (1,204 kW) Bristol Hercules XVI radial engines. Round wing tips. Armament as B.III
Halifax A.VII
Halifax B.VIIs converted into paratroop transport and glider tug aircraft.
Halifax C.VII
Halifax B.VIIs bombers converted into military transport aircraft.

=== H.P.70 ===
Halifax C.VIII
Cargo and passenger transport aircraft.

=== H.P.71 ===
Halifax A.IX
Paratroop transport, glider tug aircraft.

=== H.P.70 Halton ===
Halton I
Interim civil transport version; postwar, a number of Halifax bombers were converted into civilian transport aircraft.
Halton II
VIP transport aircraft for the Maharajah Gaekwar of Baroda.

== Operators ==
=== Military operators ===
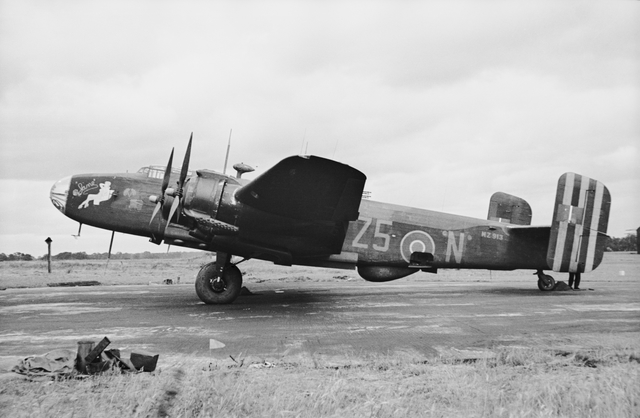
An Australian Halifax from No. 462 Squadron RAAF at RAF Foulsham in 1945

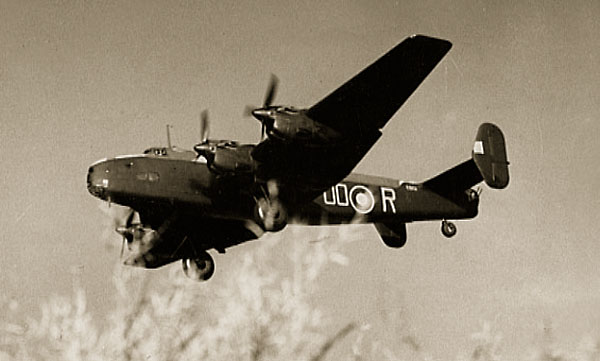
Halifax bomber OO-R of 1663 HCU from RAF Rufforth in 1944

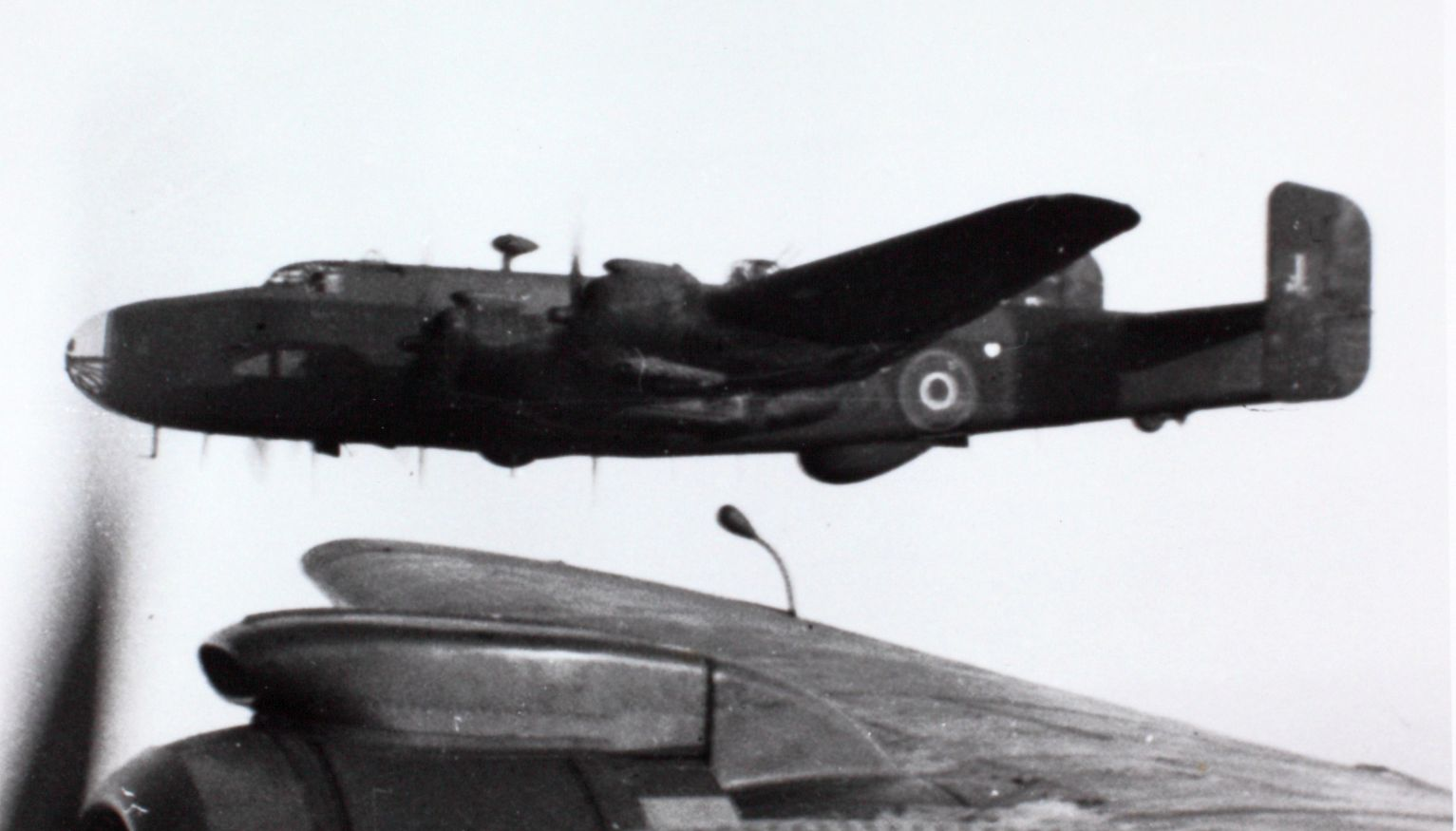
Pair of Halifax bombers flying in close formation

Australia

- Royal Australian Air Force
  - No. 460 Squadron RAAF
  - No. 462 Squadron RAAF
  - No. 466 Squadron RAAF

Canada

- Royal Canadian Air Force
  - No. 405 Squadron RCAF
  - No. 408 Squadron RCAF
  - No. 415 Squadron RCAF
  - No. 419 Squadron RCAF
  - No. 420 Squadron RCAF
  - No. 424 Squadron RCAF
  - No. 425 Squadron RCAF
  - No. 426 Squadron RCAF
  - No. 427 Squadron RCAF
  - No. 428 Squadron RCAF
  - No. 429 Squadron RCAF
  - No. 431 Squadron RCAF
  - No. 432 Squadron RCAF
  - No. 433 Squadron RCAF
  - No. 434 Squadron RCAF

Egypt

- Royal Egyptian Air Force

France

- Free French Air Forces
  - No. 346 Squadron RAF (GB II/23 Guyenne)
  - No. 347 Squadron RAF (GB I/25 Tunisie)

Pakistan

- Pakistan Air Force
  - No. 12 Squadron

Poland

- Polish Air Forces in exile in Great Britain
  - No. 301 Polish Bomber Squadron
  - C Flight No. 138 Squadron RAF, later No. 1586 (Polish Special Duties) Flight before reforming as 301 Squadron Special Duties
  - No. 304 Polish Bomber Squadron RAF

United Kingdom

- Royal Air Force
  - No. 10 Squadron RAF
  - No. 35 Squadron RAF
  - No. 47 Squadron RAF
  - No. 51 Squadron RAF
  - No. 58 Squadron RAF
  - No. 76 Squadron RAF
  - No. 77 Squadron RAF
  - No. 78 Squadron RAF
  - No. 96 Squadron RAF
  - No. 102 Squadron RAF
  - No. 103 Squadron RAF
  - No. 108 Squadron RAF
  - No. 113 Squadron RAF
  - No. 138 Squadron RAF
  - No. 148 Squadron RAF
  - No. 158 Squadron RAF
  - No. 161 Squadron RAF
  - No. 171 Squadron RAF
  - No. 178 Squadron RAF
  - No. 187 Squadron RAF
  - No. 190 Squadron RAF
  - No. 192 Squadron RAF
  - No. 199 Squadron RAF
  - No. 202 Squadron RAF
  - No. 224 Squadron RAF
  - No. 246 Squadron RAF
  - No. 295 Squadron RAF
  - No. 296 Squadron RAF
  - No. 297 Squadron RAF
  - No. 298 Squadron RAF
  - No. 502 Squadron RAF
  - No. 517 Squadron RAF
  - No. 518 Squadron RAF
  - No. 519 Squadron RAF
  - No. 520 Squadron RAF
  - No. 521 Squadron RAF
  - No. 578 Squadron RAF
  - No. 614 Squadron RAF
  - No. 620 Squadron RAF
  - No. 624 Squadron RAF
  - No. 640 Squadron RAF
  - No. 644 Squadron RAF

=== Civil operators ===
Australia

- Aircarrier (Former Wikner aircraft)
- Geoffrey Wikner (B.III converted with a 15-passenger interior)

France

- Aero Cargo
- CTAI
- SANA (Societe Anonyme de Navigation Aeriennes)

Norway

- Peteair
- Vingtor Airways

Pakistan
South Africa

- Alpha Airways
- LAMS (South Africa)

Switzerland

- Air Globe

United Kingdom

- Air Freight
- Airtech
- Bond Air Services
- British American Air Services
- British Overseas Airways Corporation
- Chartair
- C.L. Air Surveys
- Eagle Aviation
- Lancashire Aircraft Corporation
- London Aero and Motor Services (LAMS)
- Payloads
- Skyflight
- Union Air Services
- V.I.P. Services
- Westminster Airways (converted as a bulk fuel carrier for Berlin Airlift)
- World Air Freight

==== Halton operators ====
India

- Maharajah Gaekwar of Baroda

France

- Louis Breguet

South Africa

- Alpha Airways

United Kingdom

- Bond Air Services
- British American Air Services
- British Overseas Airways Corporation
- Westminster Airways
- Worldair Carrier

== Surviving aircraft ==
Of the 6,176 Halifaxes built, three complete examples remain.

Serial	Geographic location	Institutional location	History	Photo
NA337	Trenton, Ontario	National Air Force Museum of Canada	Built by Rootes Motors. Delivered to 644 Squadron at RAF Tarrant Rushton 5 March 1945. On 24 March 1945 it towed a glider as part of Operation Varsity – the airborne operation in support of crossing the Rhine. Completed three supply drops in Norway and Denmark in March and April 1945. On the fourth sortie, 23 April 1945, piloted by Alexander Turnbull, NA337 was sent to drop 13 supply containers and two packages at Mikkelsberget, Norway. After a successful drop, it was hit by flak in the starboard wing at 0131 hours on 24 April. After both starboard engines caught fire, NA337 ditched in Lake Mjøsa at 0145 hours. All but one crew member, Thomas Weightman, died of hypothermia. It was discovered in 1991 by Tore Marsoe and Rolf Liberg, and further raised in 1995 by Halifax 57 Rescue. Restoration was completed in November 2005.	
HR792	Elvington, North Yorkshire	Yorkshire Air Museum	Built by Handley Page. 58 Squadron. Flew 67 sorties, 15 July 1943 – 9 December 1944. Crash landed near Stornoway, 13 January 1945. Fuselage was purchased by a chicken farmer and used as a coop. Recovered and restored in 1984 using parts from Halifaxes LW687 and JP158 as well as wings from Hastings TG536. Painted as LV907 "Friday the 13th" of 158 Squadron.	
W1048	Colindale, London	RAF Museum London	Built by English Electric. Assigned to 102 Squadron at RAF Topcliffe on 27 March 1942. Sent to 35 Squadron at RAF Linton-on-Ouse on 9 April 1942. On 27 April, it was one of 31 Halifaxes that flew from RAF Kinloss as part of raid on the German battleship Tirpitz. W1048 made her attack at 03:00 hours, during which she was hit by the intense flak which set the starboard outer engine on fire. Pilot Don MacIntyre made a wheels-up landing on frozen Lake Hoklingen in Norway but the aircraft sank 12 hours later. It was discovered by divers in 1971 and recovered on 30 June 1973 by the RAF Sub-Aqua Association. It has been left unrestored.	

=== Recovery of Halifax wrecks ===
Halifax NA337 and LW682A have been recovered by a Canadian group, Halifax 57 Rescue. Halifax NA337 was recovered in 1995 from 750 ft (230 m) under Lake Mjøsa, Norway before being restored at the National Air Force Museum of Canada in Trenton, Ontario. In 1997, LW682 was recovered from a bog near Geraardsbergen, Belgium. Halifax 57 Rescue was also involved the recovery and subsequent burial of three crew members. Parts were used to restore NA337, and the rest was melted down for the London RAF Bomber Command Memorial.

In 2023 Halifax 57 Rescue were looking to recover two more aircraft, HR871 near Sweden, and LW170 near Scotland. Once recovered, the plan is for HR871 to be moved to the Nanton, Alberta Bomber Command Museum of Canada for restoration.

== Specifications (Mk.III) ==
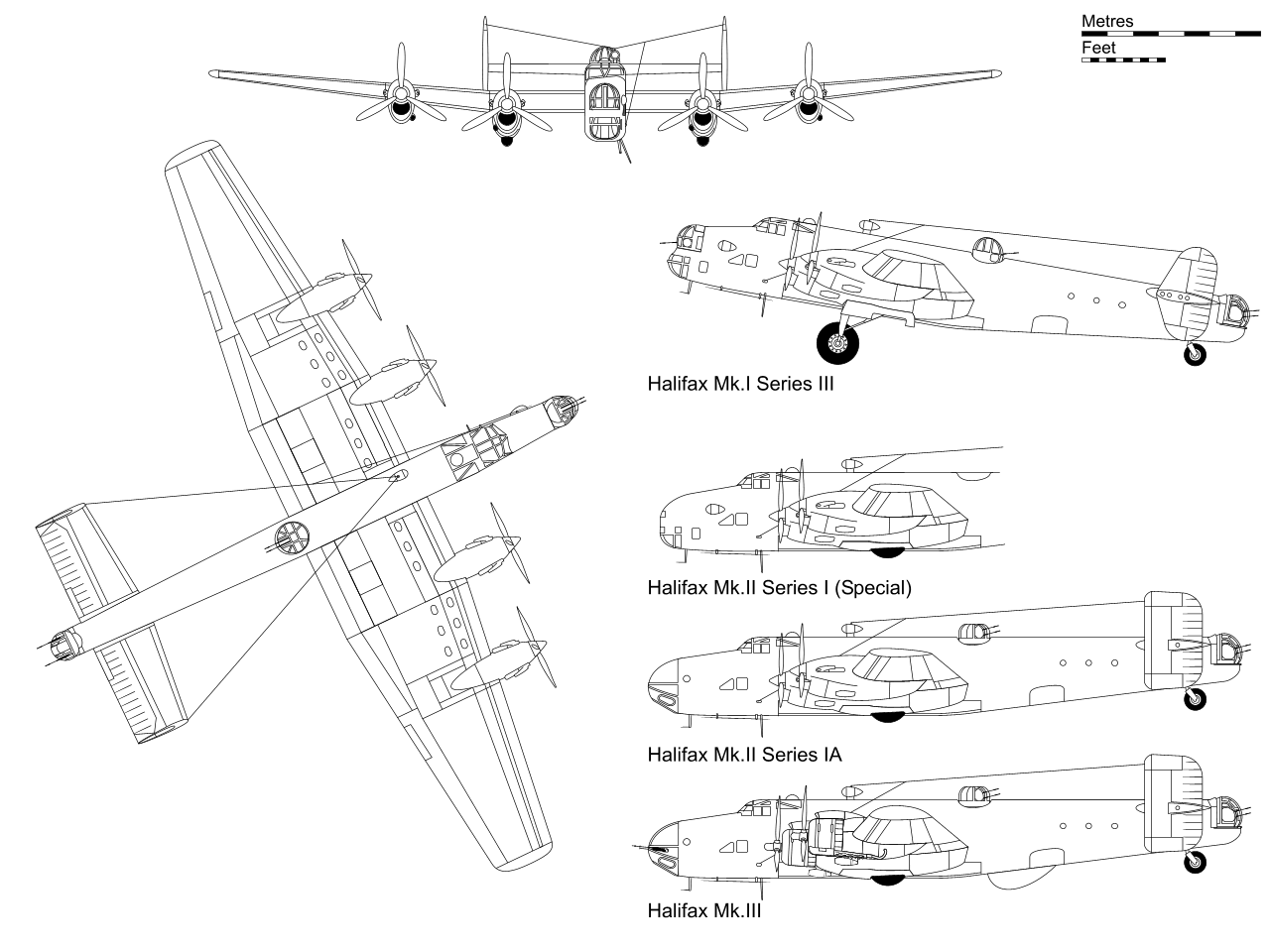
3-view drawingof Halifax Mark I Series III, with profile details of other variants.

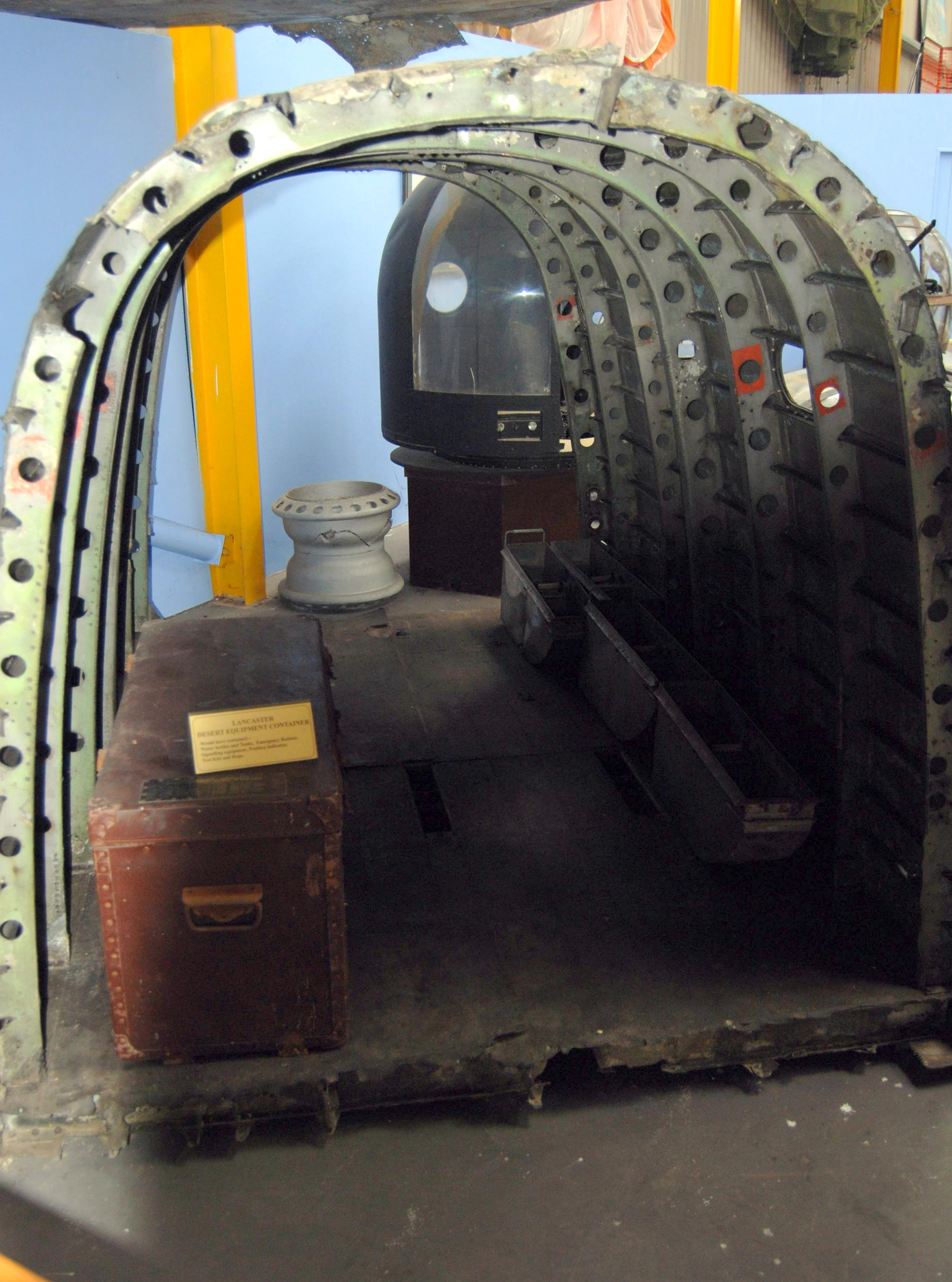
Fuselage section of a Halifax

Data from Halifax, Second to None, The Handley Page Halifax B.III, VI, VII

General characteristics

- Crew: 7 (pilot, co-pilot/flight engineer, navigator, bomb aimer, radio operator/gunner, two gunners)
- Length: 71 ft 7 in (21.82 m)
- Wingspan: 104 ft 2 in (31.75 m)
- Height: 20 ft 9 in (6.32 m)
- Wing area: 1,190 sq ft (111 m^{2})
- Airfoil: root: NACA 23021; tip: NACA 23007
- Empty weight: 37,870 lb (17,178 kg)
- Gross weight: 54,400 lb (24,675 kg)
- Max takeoff weight: 65,000 lb (29,484 kg)
- Powerplant: 4 × Bristol Hercules XVI 14-cylinder air-cooled sleeve-valve radial piston engines, 1,615 hp (1,204 kW) each
- Propellers: 3-bladed constant-speed propellers

Performance

- Maximum speed: 282 mph (454 km/h, 245 kn) at 13,500 ft (4,100 m)
- Combat range: 1,860 mi (2,990 km, 1,620 nmi)
- Service ceiling: 24,000 ft (7,300 m)
- Rate of climb: 750 ft/min (3.8 m/s)
- Wing loading: 45.7 lb/sq ft (223 kg/m^{2})
- Power/mass: 0.12 hp/lb (0.20 kW/kg)

Armament

- Guns: 8 × .303 in (7.7 mm) Browning machine guns (4 in dorsal turret, 4 in tail turret) and 1 × .303 in (7.7 mm) Vickers K machine gun in the nose.
- Bombs: 13,000 lb (5,900 kg) of bombs

Avionics

- H2S bomb-aiming radar

== See also ==
Aircraft of comparable role, configuration, and era

- Avro Lancaster
- Boeing B-17 Flying Fortress
- Consolidated B-24 Liberator
- Heinkel He 177
- Petlyakov Pe-8
- Short Stirling

Related lists

- List of aircraft of the Royal Air Force
- List of aircraft of World War II

== Bibliography ==
- Angelucci, Enzo (1988). Combat aircraft of World War II. New York: Orion Books. ISBN 978-0-51-764179-8.
- Barnes, C. H. (1976). Handley Page Aircraft since 1907. London: Putnam. ISBN 978-0-37-000030-5.
- Barnes, C. H. (1987). Handley Page Aircraft since 1907 (2nd ed.). London: Putnam. ISBN 978-0-85-177803-7.
- Bingham, Victor F. (1986). Halifax, Second to None: The Handley Page Halifax. Airlife. ISBN 978-0-90-639366-6.
- Buttler, Tony (2004). British Secret Projects: Fighters & Bombers 1935–1950. Hinckley: Midland. ISBN 978-1-85-780179-8.
- Clarke, R. M., ed. Handley Page Halifax Portfolio. Surrey, UK: Brooklands Books, No year cited. ISBN 978-0-94-820789-1.
- Clayton, Donald C. Handley Page: An Aircraft Album. Surrey, UK: Ian Allan Ltd., 1970. ISBN 978-0-71-100094-0.
- Jones, Geoffrey Patrick. Night Flight: Halifax Squadrons at War. London: William Kimber, 1981. ISBN 978-0-71-830338-9.
- Falconer, Jonathan (1998). Bomber Command Handbook 1939–1945. Stroud: Sutton. ISBN 978-0-75-093171-7.
- Falconer, J. (2016). Handley Page Halifax 1939 onwards (all marks) Owners' Workshop Manual. Sparkford: Haynes. ISBN 978-1-78-521067-9.
- Iveson, Tony; Milton, Brian (2009). Lancaster: The Biography. London: Andre Deutsch. ISBN 978-0-23-300270-5.
- Lake, Jon (1999). Halifax Squadrons of World War 2. Oxford: Osprey. ISBN 978-1-85-532892-1.
- Lake, Jon (1997). Halifax Variants. Wings of Fame. Vol. VIII. Aerospace Publishing. ISBN 978-1-86-184009-7.
- Merrick, Keith A. (1980). Halifax, an Illustrated History of a Classic World War II Bomber. Shepperton: Ian Allan. ISBN 978-0-71-100767-3.
- Merrick, Keith A. Handley Page Halifax: From Hell to Victory and Beyond. Hersham, Surrey, UK: Ian Allan Publishing, 2009. ISBN 978-1-90-653706-7.
- Merrick, Keith A. The Handley Page Halifax. Bourne Ends, Buckinghamshire, UK: Aston Publications, 1990. ISBN 978-0-946627-60-8.
- Moyes, Philip J. R. (1979). Handley Page Halifax: Merlin-Engined Variants. Aerodata International (No 7). Kidlington: Vintage Aviation Publications. ISBN 978-0-90-546950-8.
- Moyes, Philip J. R. (1966). The Handley Page Halifax B.III, VI, VII. Leatherhead: Profile Publications. OCLC 18713192.
- Norris, Geoffrey (1966). The Short Stirling. Aircraft in Profile (No. 142). Windsor: Profile Publications. OCLC 45000607.
- Rapier, Brian J. (1994). Halifax at War. Shepperton: Ian Allen. ISBN 978-1-85-648173-1.
- Robertson, B (1990). Halifax Special. Ian Allan. ISBN 978-0-71-101920-1.
- Robinson, Anthony (1979) [1977]. Wings Encyclopaedia of Aviation (2nd ed.). London: Orbis Publishing. ISBN 978-0-85-685318-0.
- Scutts, Jerry. Halifax in Action (Aircraft in Action series, No. 66). Carrollton, TX: Squadron/Signal Publications, Inc., 1984. ISBN 978-0-89-747158-9.
- Stachiw, Anthony L. and Andrew Tattersall. Handley Page Halifax: In Canadian Service St. Catharine's, Canada: Vanwell Publishing, 2005. ISBN 978-1-55-125085-4.
- "The Halifax". Flight. XLI (1739). flightglobal.com archive. 23 April 1942. ISSN 0015-3710.

=== Videography ===
- Halifax at War: The Story of a Bomber (76 min. DVD). Toronto: Nightfighters Productions, 2005. ISBN 1552595714.
