= No. 462 Squadron RAAF =

Royal Australian Air Force squadron

- Active: 1942–1944; 1944–1945; 2005–current
- Country: Australia
- Branch: Royal Australian Air Force
- Role: Heavy bomber (1942–1944); Electronic warfare (1944–1945); Information operations (2005–current)
- Part of: Cyber Command
- Current location: RAAF Base Edinburgh
- Battle honours: Fortress Europe, 1940–1944; France and Germany, 1944–1945; Ruhr, 1940–1945; Berlin, 1940–1945; German Ports, 1940–1945; South-East Europe, 1942–1945; Egypt and Libya, 1940–1943; North Africa, 1942–1943; Mediterranean, 1940–1943; Sicily, 1943; Italy, 1943–1945; El Alamein; El Hamma

Insignia
- Squadron Codes: Z5 (Aug 1944 – Sep 1945)
- Tail markings: Three vertical yellow stripes

Aircraft flown
- Bomber: Handley Page Halifax

No. 462 Squadron is a Royal Australian Air Force (RAAF) squadron which forms part of the Australian Defence Force's Cyber Command. The squadron was first formed on 6 September 1942 in Fayid, Egypt as a heavy bomber unit and saw combat in this role in the Mediterranean area until it was disbanded in March 1944. It was reformed in the United Kingdom in August 1944 to participate in the bombing campaign against Germany, and in December that year converted to a specialist electronic warfare unit. No. 462 Squadron continued in this role until the end of the European war in May 1945 and was disbanded in September that year. The squadron was reformed in its current role during April 2005. It was transferred from the RAAF to Cyber Command in 2024.

== Squadron history ==
=== 1942–1944 ===
No. 462 Squadron was formed on 6 September 1942 at RAF Fayid, Egypt as an RAAF Article XV squadron. However, the original air and ground staff, were transferred from three British Royal Air Force (RAF) units: 10, 76 and 227 Squadrons. Because of this, almost all of its personnel were non-Australian and it initially had only a single Australian airman and no Australian ground crew.

The squadron was equipped with Handley Page Halifax B. Mk. II heavy bombers and flew its first operation on the night of 8–9 September 1942 against ground targets at Tobruk. No. 462 Squadron was the only Halifax-equipped squadron in North Africa during 1942 and suffered from shortages of aircrew as a result. This problem became so severe in December that the squadron became non-operational until January 1943.

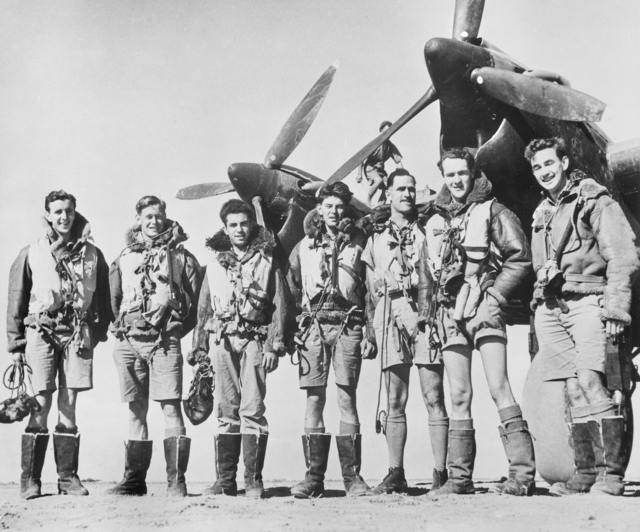
A No. 462 Squadron bomber crew in September 1942. Only the man third from the right is Australian and the others are from Britain, Newfoundland and New Zealand

RAAF Overseas Headquarters attempted to have more Australians posted to the squadron during late 1942, without much success. Furthermore, most of the Australian ground staff assigned to the squadron in 1942 had no experience with Halifaxes, which caused aircraft availability to decrease for a period. British personnel were also reportedly unhappy about serving in an "Australian" unit and this contributed to tensions amongst squadron personnel. In January 1943, the Australian Air Board agreed to a proposal by Air Marshal Richard Williams, the Commanding Officer of the RAAF Overseas Headquarters, to concentrate eight RAAF bomber squadrons into a single group in RAF Bomber Command in the UK; this would have included re-numbering the squadron, in order to formally designate it a RAF unit, and forming a new No. 462 Squadron RAAF (with different personnel) at a base in the UK. However, British authorities were slow to accept this request, and the unit retained its original designation throughout 1943.

During 1943, No. 462 Squadron remained in North Africa and conducted raids against Axis targets throughout the Mediterranean area. In the early months of 1943 it primarily attacked harbours and shipping in Sicily. These raids were initially made from Cyrenaica until the squadron moved to Gardabia Main in Tunisia on 14 February. From this base it participated in the Tunisian campaign until it concluded in May. More Australian personnel were posted into the squadron in early 1943, but by March only 120 of its 660 personnel were Australian. By August almost all aircraft maintenance was being conducted by Australian ground crew and the relationship between the Australian and British members of the squadron had improved. Following the end of the Tunisian Campaign the squadron moved to Hosc Raui in Libya from where it attacked targets in Sicily and southern Italy.

On 1 October, the squadron moved again to Terria in Libya and conducted raids against German targets in Greece, Crete, Rhodes and other islands in the Dodecanese. In December 1943 its operations included conducting attacks on Greek ports and bays including Salamis Island, Piraeus, Salonika, and Suda to divert attention away from aircraft laying naval mines nearby. By late 1943 – despite the efforts of the RAAF to "Australianise" the squadron – it still contained mostly British personnel. RAAF Overseas Headquarters again requested that No. 462 Squadron be officially re-numbered and officially cease to be an RAAF unit; the RAF agreed to this request in December 1943, although it was not put into effect for more than two months. The squadron moved to RAF El Adem, Libya, on 1 January 1944 and continued operations over Greece, mainly attacks on ports and dropping propaganda leaflets.

On 1 March 1944, after No. 462 Squadron relocated to Celone Airfield in Italy, it was re-designated No. 614 Squadron RAF. The squadron's Australian personnel were gradually posted to other units, although it was not until mid-1944 that Australian ground crew left and the Australian aircrew in the unit had dropped to a proportion similar to that of other squadrons in No. 205 Group RAF.

=== 1944–1945 ===
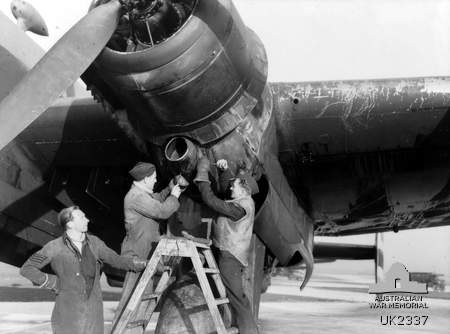
Australian ground crew working on one of No. 462 Squadron's Halifax bombers in December 1944

No. 462 Squadron was reformed at RAF Driffield, Yorkshire in Britain on 12 August 1944 as an Australian heavy bomber squadron within RAF Bomber Command, now equipped with Halifax B.Mk.III bombers. In its new incarnation the squadron had an Australian commanding officer and a higher proportion of its personnel were Australians. Many of its initial personnel were transferred from No. 466 Squadron RAAF, then also at Driffield. No. 462 Squadron flew its first operational mission on 25 August and subsequently took part in attacks against 39 different targets over the next four months in support of Allied ground forces in Western Europe and as part of Bomber Command's campaign against Germany.

On 27 December 1944 No. 462 Squadron was relocated to RAF Foulsham and became part of No. 100 Group RAF. This group specialised in electronic warfare and No. 462 Squadron's aircraft were modified to radar jamming equipment and other countermeasures. Until the end of the war the squadron used its special equipment and mounted small diversionary attacks to deceive the Germans as to the location of the raids conducted by Bomber Command. While the squadron maintained a high rate of operations at times, its losses were relatively light as the countermeasures carried by the aircraft also protected them from attack. No. 462 Squadron continued to operate until almost the end of the war in Europe, and was the only Australian squadron in Bomber Command to either fly a higher number of sorties in April 1945 than March or operate in May. The squadron flew its final operation of the war on the night of 2/3 May.

Following the end of the European war, the RAF sought to retain No. 462 Squadron for a period so that it could be used to test radio countermeasure equipment and techniques. As a result, the squadron continued to fly training and ferry flights and also conducted armed patrols over Germany. These duties continued until the squadron was disbanded at Foulsham on 24 September 1945.

=== Since 2005 ===
No. 462 Squadron was reformed in April 2005 as a non-flying squadron within the Information Warfare Directorate of the RAAF's Air Warfare Centre. The squadron's role is to "protect the Air Force's capability through the conduct of information operations". The squadron has a detachment in Canberra but is primarily based at RAAF Base Edinburgh in South Australia. The squadron is supported by an Intelligence Flight, Training and Standards Flight, Operations Support Flight, and Engineering Maintenance Section. No. 462 Squadron attends to the requests of multiple customers seeking expert advice, accreditation of Air Force's standalone mission systems and networks and an incident response capability. It also supports exercises and operations across the world, receiving widespread recognition for its effectiveness and cutting-edge approach as Air Force's emerging cyber capability.

In mid-2024 No. 462 Squadron was transferred to the newly-formed Cyber Command, along with the Australian Defence Force's other cyber units. It is assigned to the Cyber Forces Group within the command. This change aimed to better integrate the ADF's cyber capabilities and improve their effectiveness.

== Aircraft operated ==
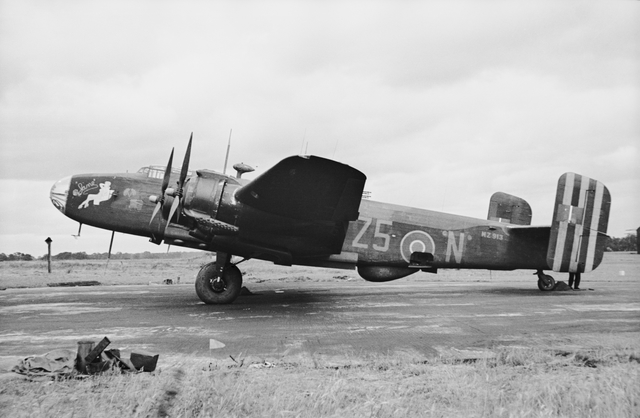
A No. 462 Squadron Halifax in 1944, the yellow tail stripes identifying it as part of No. 4 Group RAF.

Aircraft operated by no. 462 Squadron RAAF, data from
From	To	Aircraft	Version
September 1942	March 1944	Handley Page Halifax	Mk.II
August 1944	September 1945	Handley Page Halifax	Mk.III

== Squadron bases ==
Bases and airfields use by no 462 Squadron RAAF, data from
From	To	Base
7 September 1942	13 November 1942	RAF Fayid, Egypt
13 November 1942	29 November 1942	LG.237 Kilo 40/Jebel Hamzi, Egypt
29 November 1942	14 December 1942	LG.167/Bir el Baheira, Libya
14 December 1942	18 January 1943	LG.237 Kilo 40/Jebel Hamzi, Egypt
18 January 1943	24 January 1943	LG.167/Bir el Baheira, Libya
24 January 1943	14 February 1943	Soluch I, Libya
14 February 1943	22 May 1943	Gardabia Main, Libya
22 May 1943	1 October 1943	Hosc Raui, Libya
1 October 1943	1 January 1944	Terria, Libya
1 January 1944	1 March 1944	LG.144/El Adem, Libya
1 March 1944	3 March 1944	Celone airfield, Italy
12 August 1944	29 December 1944	RAF Driffield, Yorkshire
29 December 1944	24 September 1945	RAF Foulsham, Norfolk
11 April 2005	Present	Canberra, Australia RAAF Edinburgh, South Australia

== Commanding officers ==
Officers commanding no. 462 Squadron RAAF in the Mediterranean, data from
From	To	Name
7 September 1942	8 October 1942	Wing Commander David Oswald Young, DSO, DFC, AFC, RAF
9 October 1942	13 January 1943	Wing Commander George Philip Seymour-Price, DFC, RAF
14 January 1943	14 July 1943 (killed in action)	Wing Commander Peter George Batty Warner, DSO, RAFVR
17 July 1943	19 August 1943	Squadron Leader Reginald Owen Buskell, DFC, RAF (temporarily commanding)
29 August 1943	15 February 1944	Wing Commander William Taylor Russell, RAF

Squadron disbanded 3 March 1944 at Celone airfield, Italy.
Squadron reformed 12 August 1944 at RAF Driffield, UK

Officers commanding no. 462 Squadron RAAF in the European theatre of operations, data from
From	To	Name
12 August 1944	17 January 1945	Wing Commander David Eliot Strachan Shannon, DFC, RAAF
17 January 1945	24 September 1945	Wing Commander Peter McCallum Paull, DFC(US), RAAF

Squadron disbanded 24 September 1945 at RAF Foulsham, UK.
Squadron reformed 11 April 2005 in Canberra, Australia

Officers commanding no. 462 Squadron RAAF in its present incarnation
From	To	Name
11 April 2005	21 January 2007	Wing Commander Brett 'Frosty' Newell, RAAF
21 January 2007	21 January 2009	Wing Commander Nicholas Allan Cram, RAAF
21 January 2009	6 December 2010	Wing Commander Darren Reyce May, RAAF
6 December 2010	29 June 2012	Wing Commander Paul Wade, RAAF
29 June 2012	4 December 2015	Wing Commander Richard John Hutchinson, CSC, RAAF
4 December 2015		Wing Commander Michael Reidy, RAAF
