= RAF Snaith =

Royal Air Force base in Yorkshire, England

RAF Snaith
- Snaith, East Riding of Yorkshire in England
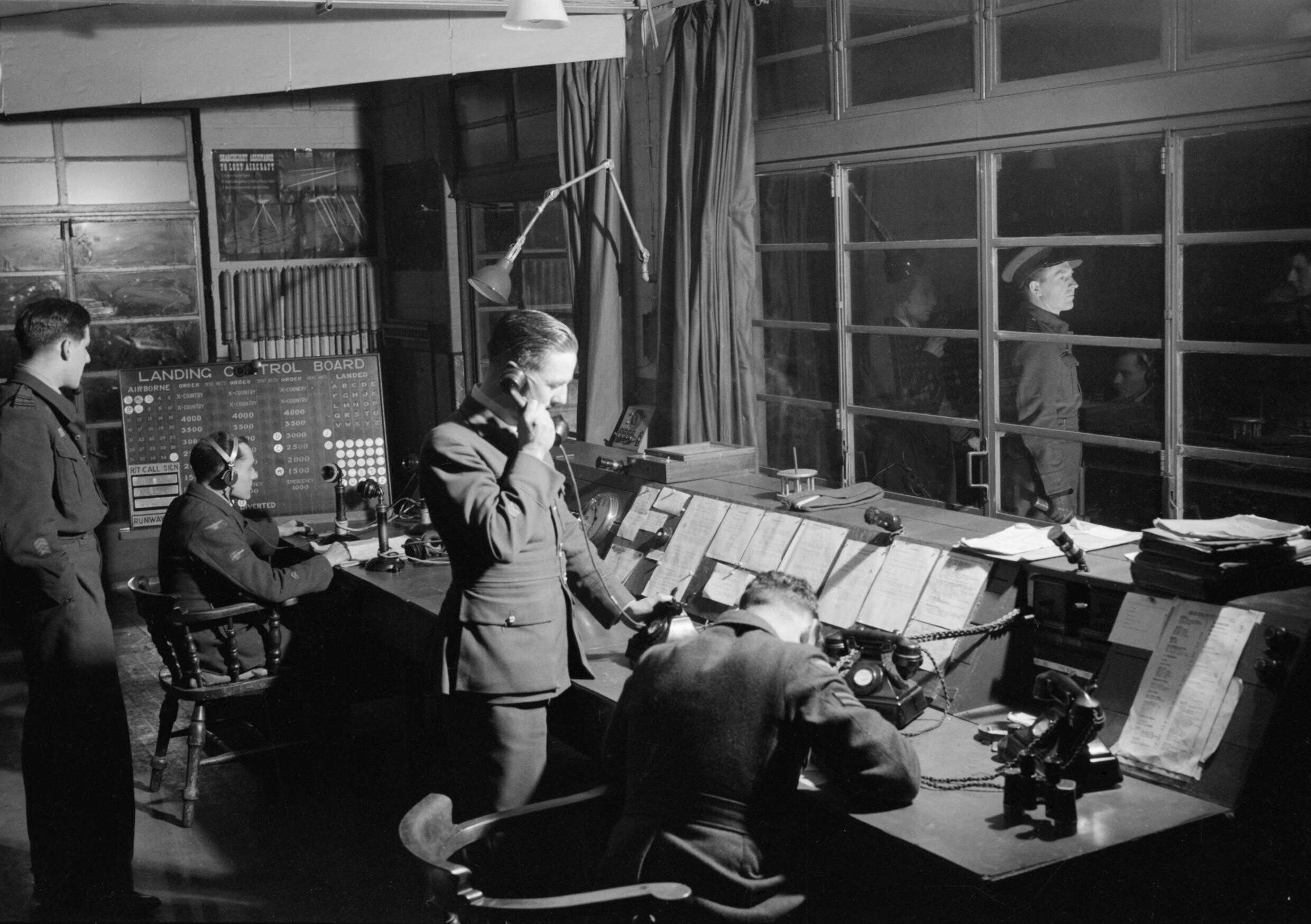
- Watch Office at RAF Snaith

Site information
- Type: Royal Air Force station
- Owner: Air Ministry
- Operator: Royal Air Force
- Controlled by: RAF Bomber Command

Location
- Shown within East Riding of Yorkshire RAF Snaith (the United Kingdom)
- Coordinates: 53°40′53″N 001°05′00″W

Site history
- Built: 1940/41
- In use: 1941 - 1946
- Battles/wars: European theatre of World War II

Airfield information
Runways
| Direction | Length and surface |
|---|---|
| 00/00 | Concrete |
| 00/00 | Concrete |
| 00/00 | Concrete |

Royal Air Force Snaith or RAF Snaith is a former Royal Air Force station which was located 7 miles (11 km) south west of Goole, Yorkshire, England and close to the village of Pollington.

The airfield opened 1941 before closing in 1946.

== Based units ==
The airfield opened in July 1941, and was called RAF Snaith, rather than RAF Pollington (the village that it was nearest to), so as to avoid confusion with RAF Pocklington.

A large number of different squadrons used the airfield firstly No. 150 Squadron RAF flew Vickers Wellingtons between July 1941 and October 1942 before moving to RAF Kirmington, then being replaced by No. 51 Squadron RAF from October 1942 until May 1945 using the Handley Page Halifax. During this period the airfield also had another squadron join as a flight from No.51 Sqn RAF turned its aircraft and crew over to make another squadron which was No. 578 Squadron RAF which flew from the airfield temporarily between January 1944 until February 1944 before moving to the empty RAF Burn.

A number of units also used the airfield such as No 6266 Servicing Echelon between 27 April 1944 and 6 May 1944 repairing the various aircraft and No. 17 Air Crew Holding Unit between 20 June 1945 and 27 May 1946. During this time a small Beam Approach Flight using Airspeed Oxfords used the airfield for a short period learning beam approach landings.

=== Units and aircraft ===
| Unit | Dates | Aircraft | Variant | Notes |
|---|---|---|---|---|
| 51 Squadron | October 1942 - April 1945 | Handley Page Halifax | II later III | Re-equipped with Halifax III in January 1945 before moving to RAF Leconfield in April 1945. |
| 150 Squadron | July 1941 - October 1942 | Vickers Wellington | IC later III | |
| 266 Squadron | April 1944 - May 1944 | Hawker Typhoon | IB | Two-week stay. |
| 578 Squadron | January 1944 - February 1944 | Handley Page Halifax | III | Formed from C Flight of 51 Squadron before moving to RAF Burn. |
| No. 17 Air Crew Holding Unit | June 1944 - November 1945 | | | |
| No. 1508 (Radio Aids Training) Flight RAF | September 1945 - April 1946 | Airspeed Oxford | | Became No. 1508 (Acclimatisation) Flight RAF in November 1945 |
| No. 1516 (Radio Aids Training) Flight RAF | September 1945 - May 1946 | Airspeed Oxford | | |
| No. 20 Operational Training Unit RAF | | | | |
| Airborne Forces Experimental Establishment | | | | |

== Current use ==
During the construction of the M62 motorway the airfield was cut in half with the motorway going east to west through the top third of the airfield. However a number of technical buildings are still in place including the sergeants mess.

The former WAAF buildings, located on Long Lane, Pollington, are the home of RAF Snaith Museum.
