= Cyril Joe Barton =

Recipient of the Victoria Cross

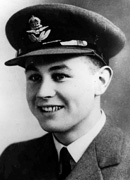
- Born: 5 June 1921; Elveden, Suffolk, England
- Died: 31 March 1944 (aged 22); Ryhope, County Durham, England
- Burial place: Bonner Hill Road Cemetery, Kingston-upon-Thames
- Military career
- Allegiance: United Kingdom/British Empire
- Branch: Royal Air Force
- Service years: 1941–44
- Rank: Flying Officer (posthumous)
- Units: No. 578 Squadron (1944); No. 78 Squadron (1943–44)
- Conflicts: Second World War: European air campaign; Berlin bombing campaign; Battle of Berlin (DOW)
- Awards: Victoria Cross

Cyril Joe Barton, VC (5 June 1921 – 31 March 1944) was a Second World War bomber pilot in the Royal Air Force who received the Victoria Cross, the highest award for gallantry in the face of the enemy that can be awarded to British and Commonwealth Armed Forces.

== Early life ==
Cyril Barton was born in Elveden, in the county of Suffolk on 5 June 1921, the son of Ethel (1896–1958) and Frederick (1892–1963). He received his early schooling at Beverley Boys' School, in New Malden, in the county of Surrey. In his childhood he was a Boy Scout. At 16 years of age he was apprenticed as an engineer at the Parnall Aircraft Factory works in Tolworth, and was a part-time student of engineering at Kingston Technical College, in Kingston-upon-Thames, Surrey.

== Second World War ==
Barton left his reserved occupation apprenticeship at the Parnall Aircraft Factory and volunteered for the Royal Air Force Volunteer Reserve on 16 April 1941, when he was 19 years of age.

After pilot training via the Arnold Scheme at Maxwell Field, Montgomery, Alabama, and Darr Aero Tech at Albany, Georgia, in the United States, he qualified as a sergeant pilot on 10 November 1942. He then returned to England and completed his training with No. 1663 Heavy Conversion Unit at Rufforth, Yorkshire.

On 5 September 1943, he joined an aircrew assigned to Bomber Command's No. 78 Squadron, with Barton receiving a commission as a pilot officer three weeks later. Their first operational mission was against a target at Montlucon in occupied France. Barton completed nine sorties with No. 78 Squadron until 15 January 1944, when he was posted to No. 578 Squadron, based at RAF Burn in North Yorkshire. His second sortie with the new squadron was an attack upon the city of Stuttgart in Germany, flying in Halifax LK797 (codename LK-E). By 30 March 1944, he had completed six sorties in LK797, which the crew had named Excalibur. Prior to his final mission from RAF Burn, Barton had already taken part in four attacks upon Berlin.

=== Attack on Nuremberg ===
On the night of 30 March 1944, while flying in an attack on the city of Nuremberg, in Germany, during the Battle of Berlin air offensive, whilst 70 miles (110 km) from the target, Pilot Officer Barton's Handley Page Halifax bomber (Serial number: LK797) was badly shot-up in attacks by two Luftwaffe night-fighters, a Junkers Ju 88 and a Messerschmitt 210, resulting in two of its fuel tanks being punctured, both its radio and rear turret gun port being disabled, the starboard inner engine being critically damaged and the internal intercom lines being cut. In a running battle, despite the attacks being persistent and determined, Barton as captain of the aircraft succeeded by good flying in throwing off and escaping his faster and more agile assailants. However, a misunderstanding in on-board communications in the aircraft at the height of the crisis resulted in three of the 7-man crew bailing out, leaving Barton with no navigator, bombardier or wireless operator. Rather than turn back for England, he decided to press on with the mission, against the odds of further attacks in a semi-wrecked aircraft that was leaking fuel and handicapped by lack of a full crew. Arriving over the target, he released the bomb payload himself and then, as Barton turned the aircraft for home, its ailing starboard engine blew-up. Subsequently he nursed the damaged airframe over a four-and-a-half-hour flight with no navigational assistance back across the hostile defences of Germany and occupied Europe, and across the North Sea. As LK797 crossed the English coast at dawn 90 miles to the north of its base its fuel ran out because of the battle damage leakage and, with only one engine still running on vapours, and at too low a height to allow a remaining crew bail-out by parachute, Barton crash-landed the bomber at the village of Ryhope, steering away in the final descent from the houses and coal pit-head workings. Barton was pulled from the wrecked aircraft alive but died of injuries sustained in the landing before he reached the hospital. The three remaining on-board members of the crew survived the forced landing. One local man, a miner, also died when he was struck by a piece of the aeroplane's wreckage during the impact of the crash.

After Barton's death his mother received a posthumous letter addressed to her from him containing the following passage: "I hope that you will never receive this letter, but I quite expect that you will. I know what "Ops." over Germany means, and I have no illusions about it. By my own calculations the average lifespan of an aircrew is twenty ops (operations). and we have 30 to do in our first tour. I'm Writing this for two reasons. One to tell you how I would like my money to be spent that I have left behind me; two to tell you how I feel about meeting my Maker. 1. I intended as you know, taking a university course with my savings. Well, I would like it to be spent over the education of my brothers and sisters. 2. All I can say about this is that I am quite prepared to die It holds no terror for me. At times I've wondered whether I've been right in believing what I do, and just recently I've doubted the veracity of the Bible, but in the little time I've had to sort out intellectual problems I've been left with a bias in favour of the Bible. Apart from this, though, I have the inner conviction as I write, of a force outside myself, and my brain tells me that I have not trusted in vain. All I am anxious about is that you and the rest of the family will also come to know Him. Ken, I know already does. I commend my Saviour to you. I am writing to Doreen separately. I expect you will have guessed by now that we are quite in love with each other. Well, that's covered everything now I guess, so love to Dad and all, Your loving son Cyril." The attack on Nuremberg was Barton's nineteenth sortie.

In a last letter to his younger brother shortly before his death, Barton wrote: "I am quite prepared to die, death hold no terrors for me. I have done nothing to merit glory."

=== Awards ===
For his actions in the attack on Nuremberg Barton was awarded the Victoria Cross posthumously in June 1944. Post-war he was posthumously issued the 1939–1945 Star; the Air Crew Europe Star; Defence Medal, and the War Medal 1939–1945.

== Memorials ==
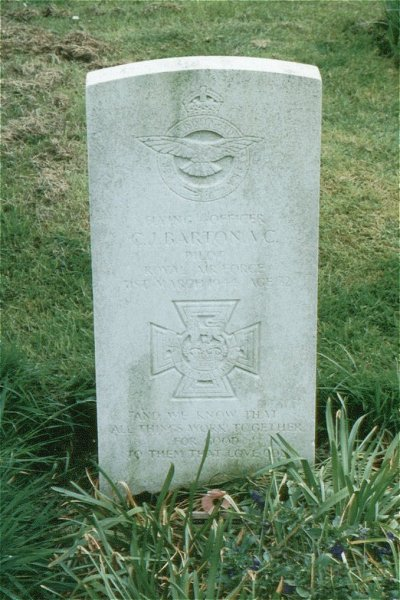
Barton's grave

Barton's body was buried with full military honours in April 1944 in a registered war grave at the South-West corner of Kingston-upon-Thames Cemetery, in the County of Surrey.

Barton Green in New Malden, Surrey, where he had attended school, was named in his honour in the early 1950s.

Barton Road at the Yorkshire Air Museum in Elvington, North Yorkshire, was named in his honour in the year 2000 on the 56th anniversary of his death in action.

A housing estate in Ryhope, Barton Park, was also named after him, and a nearby street was named Halifax Place, after the bomber-type that he flew in the exploit.

Coombe Boys' School (formerly named Beverley Boys' School when Barton was a pupil there) in New Malden, Surrey, named a new building after him in 2009.

Kingston College, where Barton was a student when the war broke out, offers an annual prize for the pupil of the year, which is named after him.

A portrait painting of him hangs in his memory in the Wheatsheaf Inn at Burn, North Yorkshire, where Barton's squadron, 578 Squadron, was based at the time of his last sortie.

His Victoria Cross is on display at the Royal Air Force Museum Cosford.

Longhedge housing estate in Salisbury, Wiltshire named the street Barton Place in his honour in 2022.
