= RAF Burn =

Royal Air Force base in Yorkshire, England

RAF Burn
- Near Burn, North Yorkshire in England
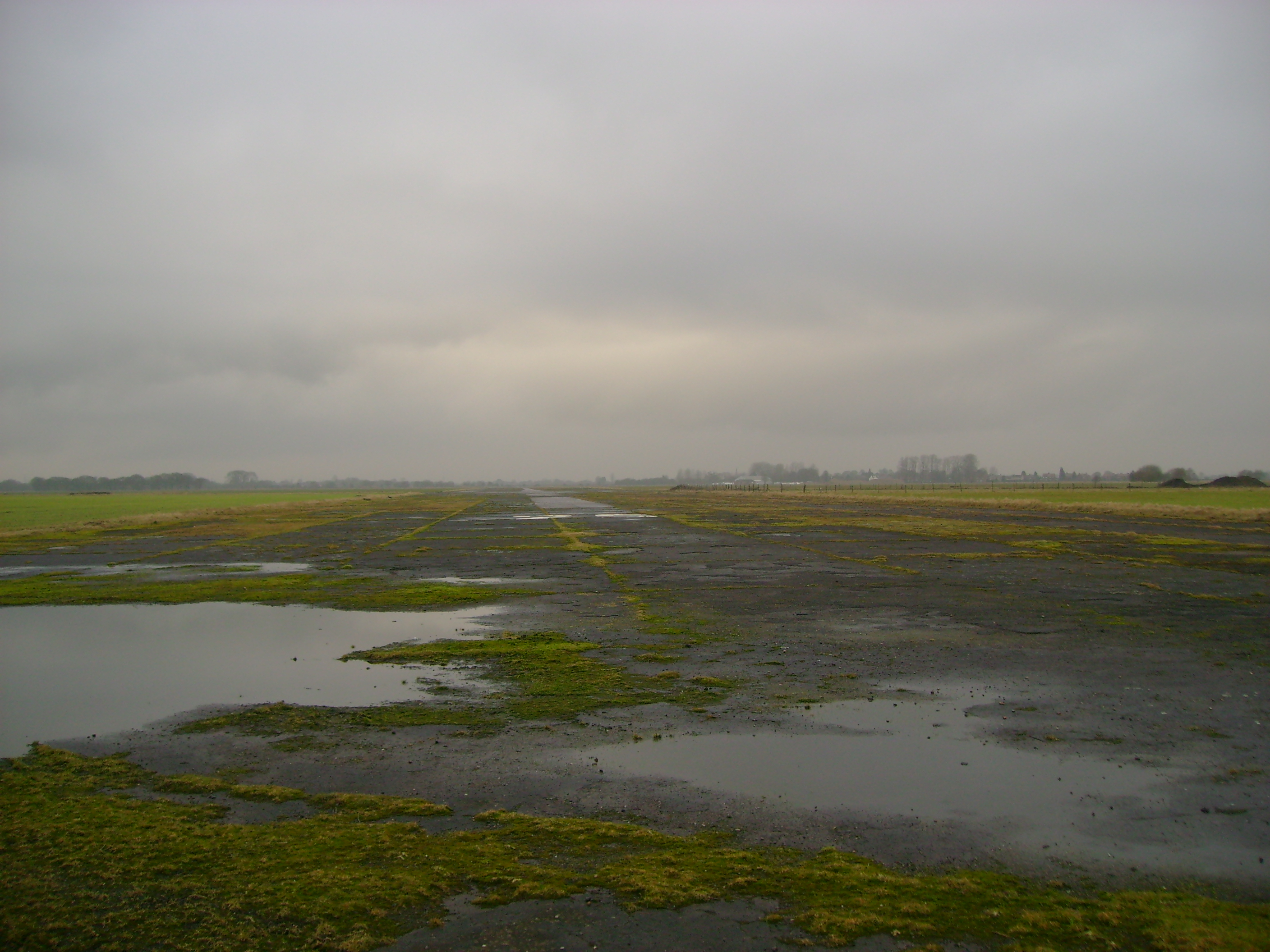
- Former northeast-southwest runway

Site information
- Type: Royal Air Force satellite station
- Code: AZ
- Owner: Air Ministry
- Operator: Royal Air Force
- Controlled by: RAF Bomber Command * No. 4 Group RAF * No. 6 Group RCAF

Location
- Shown within North Yorkshire RAF Burn (the United Kingdom)
- Coordinates: 53°44′53″N 001°05′02″W

Site history
- Built: 1941/42
- In use: November 1942 -1946
- Battles/wars: European theatre of World War II

Airfield information
- Identifiers: IATA: XBRN, ICAO: XBRN
- Elevation: 20 feet (6 m) AMSL
Runways
Direction	Length and surface
01/19	1,820 metres (5,971 ft) Concrete
07/25	1,420 metres (4,659 ft) Concrete
15/33	1,320 metres (4,331 ft) Concrete

Royal Air Force Burn or more simply RAF Burn is a former Royal Air Force satellite station located 5 miles (8 km) south of Selby and 0.5 miles (0.8 km) east of Burn in North Yorkshire, England which opened in 1942 before closing in 1946.

== Station history ==
The airfield was opened in 1942 and first hosted No. 431 Squadron, Royal Canadian Air Force as part of 4 Group RAF Bomber Command which formed at the airfield on 13 November 1942 flying Vickers Wellington Mark X aircraft while at Burn. On 15 July 1943 the squadron was transferred to RAF Tholthorpe and became part of No. 6 Group RCAF.

On 1 January 1944 No. 658 Squadron RAF moved to the airfield from RAF Clifton flying the Taylorcraft Auster III but left after only seven days, moving to RAF Doncaster. On 21 January 1944 the squadron returned, this time staying until 14 March 1944 when they moved to RAF Collyweston. The squadron was briefly joined on 31 December 1943 by 659 Squadron which moved to RAF Clifton the following day.

During its use the airfield was also used by No. 10 Air Crew Holding Unit RAF.

On 6 January 1944 No. 578 Squadron RAF squadron was relocated to RAF Burn from RAF Snaith. This Bomber Command squadron flew Handley Page Halifax Mk. III before disbanding on 15 April 1945 and the station was closed for flying operations in July 1945.

On the night of 30 March 1944, Pilot Officer Cyril Joe Barton took off from RAF Burn in Halifax LK797 for a raid on Nuremberg, and won a posthumous Victoria Cross for valour.

Shortly after flying was discontinued, the Royal Army Service Corps took over some facilities to store surplus equipment. Many of the buildings have been dismantled but all three runways remain intact and are used by Burn Gliding Club Ltd.

== Current use ==
The runways and hardstands are relatively intact, with Burn Gliding Club using the old aerodrome. The perimeter track of the airfield is also the location for the weekly Selby parkrun.

== See also ==
- List of former Royal Air Force stations
