= Listed buildings in Burn, North Yorkshire =

Burn is a civil parish in the county of North Yorkshire, England. It contains two listed buildings that are recorded in the National Heritage List for England. Both the listed buildings are designated at Grade II, the lowest of the three grades, which is applied to "buildings of national importance and special interest". The parish contains the village of Burn and the surrounding countryside, and the listed buildings consist of a culvert tunnel under the Selby Canal, and a milestone.

== Buildings ==
Name and location	Photograph	Date	Notes
Selby Canal, Lund Tunnel; 53.74694°N 1.12797°W		1778	A culvert tunnel designed by William Jessop and constructed by the Aire and Calder Navigation Company to reduce the risk of flooding. It is in limestone and gritstone, and consists of a sump on each side of the canal, linked by a culvert tunnel passing under the canal, and is built on timber foundations.
Milestone; 53.75473°N 1.09564°W		19th century	The milestone is on the east side of the A19 road. It consists of a stone about 0.7 metres (2 ft 4 in) high with a pointed head. The milestone is inscribed with the distances to Doncaster, Askern, Selby and York.
