= Burn, North Yorkshire =

Village and civil parish in North Yorkshire, England

Coordinates: 53.749°N 1.103°W

Burn
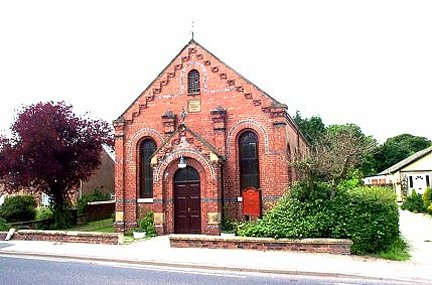
- Burn Methodist Church

- Location within North Yorkshire
- Population: 491 (2011 census)
- OS grid reference: SE592284
- Civil parish: Burn
- Unitary authority: North Yorkshire
- Ceremonial county: North Yorkshire
- Region: Yorkshire and the Humber
- Country: England
- Sovereign state: United Kingdom
- Post town: SELBY
- Postcode district: YO8
- Dialling code: 01757
- Police: North Yorkshire
- Fire: North Yorkshire
- Ambulance: Yorkshire
- UK Parliament: Selby

Burn is a small village and civil parish in North Yorkshire, England. It is situated 3 miles (4.8 km) south of Selby and 14 miles (22.5 km) south of York. The village is mainly situated around the main A19 road.

== History ==
The village was historically part of the West Riding of Yorkshire until 1974. From 1974 to 2023 it was part of the Selby District, it is now administered by the unitary North Yorkshire Council.

To the east of the A19 is Burn Airfield, built in 1942 as a bomber airfield in the Second World War. The airfield was owned by Yorkshire Forward (the regional development agency) prior to the dissolution of that body in 2012, and is now owned by the Homes and Communities Agency. It is now used by Burn Gliding Club.

For some time in the early 21st century there were plans that the airfield might be developed as the site of the European Spallation Source (ESS), a particle accelerator facility to generate neutrons by spallation. Outline planning permission for the ESS was conditionally granted by Selby District Council on 14 September 2005. However, later statements by Lord Sainsbury the then outgoing UK Science Minister that "no major science facility should be built outside existing sites at Oxford and Daresbury" made it appear unlikely that the project would go ahead.

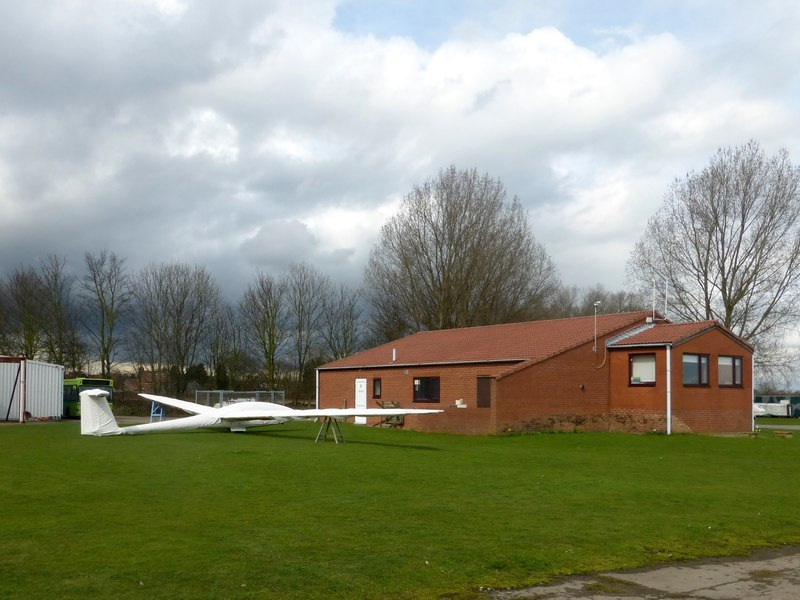
Burn Gliding Club at Burn Airfield

In the 20th century, Burn had a missionary house that was used as a Sunday School. It is now a private dwelling.

George King, a great-grandfather of the Colombian footballer Radamel Falcao, was born in the village.

== Present day ==
Facilities and leisure activities in Burn include; The Wheatsheaf Inn public house, Burn Gliding Club, Burn Cricket Club, Methodist Church, Children's Day Nursery and Dog Day Care & Grooming Centre.

The Selby Canal is located to the west of the village which offers an abundance of walks and trails.

The village has its own telephone exchange which serves about 400 premises. It was enabled for ADSL in October 2004 and ADSL Max in March 2006. It has been accepting orders for FTTC BT Infinity since February 2014

The village green hosts an RAF Squadron Memorial which is maintained by the local community.

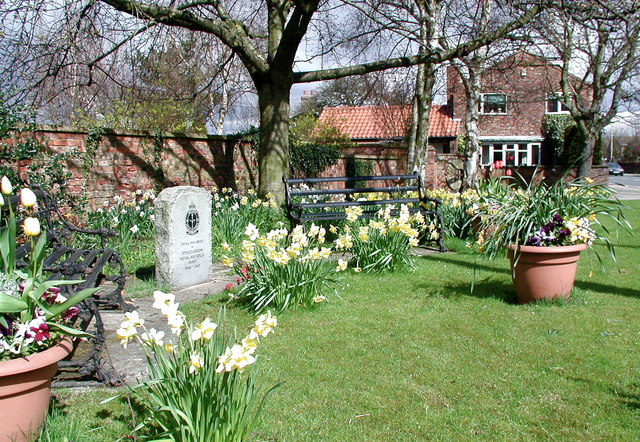
Squadron Memorial Garden on Main Road

== Discovery of Chen Cai Guan ==
In January 2009, Chinese national Chen Cai Guan was tortured and beaten to death in a warehouse on an Elvington Industrial Estate, just outside York. The two men responsible for the murder Huang Bao Lung and Zhang Zhouli both admitted links to the 14K Triads, a Hong Kong based criminal gang. Huang and Zhang rented the warehouse as part of a nationwide Cannabis factory operation, using a food storage business as a front.

In March 2009 Chen's body was found by fishermen at the canal in Burn. When the North Yorkshire Police raided the facility in Elvington shortly after the murder took place, they seized 1,500 Cannabis plants and arrested the suspects, also finding traces of the victim's blood that they had failed to cover up.

In July, Huang, from Fujian in China, and Zhang, from Dong Bei, received life sentences with minimum terms of 18 years and 16 years respectively after being convicted of Chen's murder.

== See also ==
- Listed buildings in Burn, North Yorkshire
