= No. 51 Squadron RAF =

Flying squadron of the Royal Air Force

- Squadron badge
- Active: 1916–1918 (RFC); 1918–1919; 1937–1950; 1958–present
- Country: United Kingdom
- Branch: Royal Air Force
- Type: Flying squadron
- Role: Intelligence, surveillance, target acquisition and reconnaissance (ISTAR)
- Size: Three aircraft
- Part of: ISTAR Force
- Station: RAF Waddington
- Nickname: 'York's own squadron'
- Mottos: Swift and sure
- Aircraft: Boeing RC-135W Rivet Joint

Insignia
- Tail codes: UT (Aug 1939–Sep 1939); MH (Sep 1939–May 1945); LK (C Flt: ?–Jan 1944); C6 (C Flt: Jan 1944–May 1945 ) TB (May 1945 – Dec 1949); MH (Dec 1949–Oct 1950)

Number 51 Squadron is a squadron of the Royal Air Force. Since 2014 it has operated the Boeing RC-135W Rivet Joint, from RAF Waddington, Lincolnshire.

It had previously flown the Hawker Siddeley Nimrod R.1 from 1974 until 2011. Following the Nimrod's retirement, crews from No. 51 Squadron trained alongside the United States Air Force on the RC-135W Rivet Joint, which was being acquired by the RAF under the Airseeker project.

== History ==
=== World War I ===
No. 51 Squadron Royal Flying Corps flew B.E.2 and B.E.12 aircraft; the squadron formed at Thetford, Norfolk, before moving its headquarters to the airfield that later became RAF Marham. The squadron's primary role during the First World War was defence of the UK against German Zeppelin raids. It also used the Avro 504K to give night flying training to new pilots. The squadron disbanded in 1919.

=== Interwar years ===
The squadron was reborn when 'B' Flight of 58 Squadron was renumbered as 51 Squadron at Driffield in March 1937, flying Virginias and Ansons. At this time the squadron badge was being chosen and a goose was chosen as a play on words: the squadron was flying the Anson and the Latin for goose is Anser. It was also appropriate for a bomber unit to have a heavy wild fowl to represent it.

=== Second World War ===
No. 51 Squadron dropped leaflets over Germany on the very first night of the Second World War, using the Whitley aircraft.

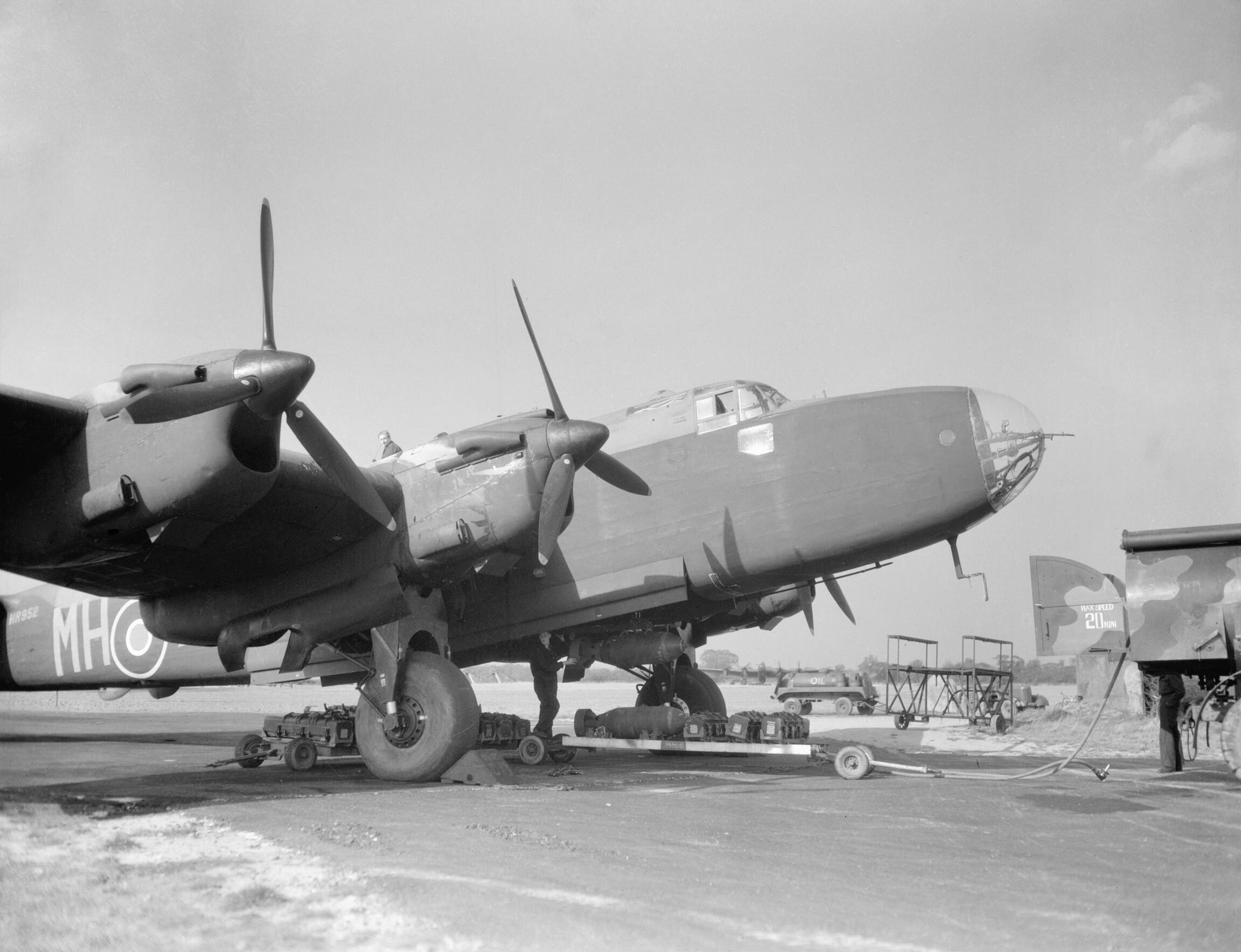
Bombs being loaded into a No. 51 Squadron Handley Page Halifax at RAF Snaith during the Second World War

In February 1942, led by the legendary Percy Pickard, No. 51 Squadron carried 119 paratroops and an RAF flight sergeant skilled in electronics to Bruneval, France, in converted Whitleys. The men then carried out a very successful raid on a German radar installation, removing parts of a new type known as a Würzburg, which they took back to Britain.

A brief period as part of Coastal Command patrolling against the U-boats in the Bay of Biscay preceded the re-equipment with the Halifax in 1942. 51 spent the rest of the war in Europe flying as part of No. 4 Group RAF, RAF Bomber Command's strategic bombing offensive against the Nazis, operating from RAF Snaith in East Yorkshire.

=== Postwar ===
The squadron became part of Transport Command with Stirlings and later Yorks following the end of the European war, transporting men and material to India and the Far East. The squadron disbanded in 1950, after taking part in the Berlin Airlift.

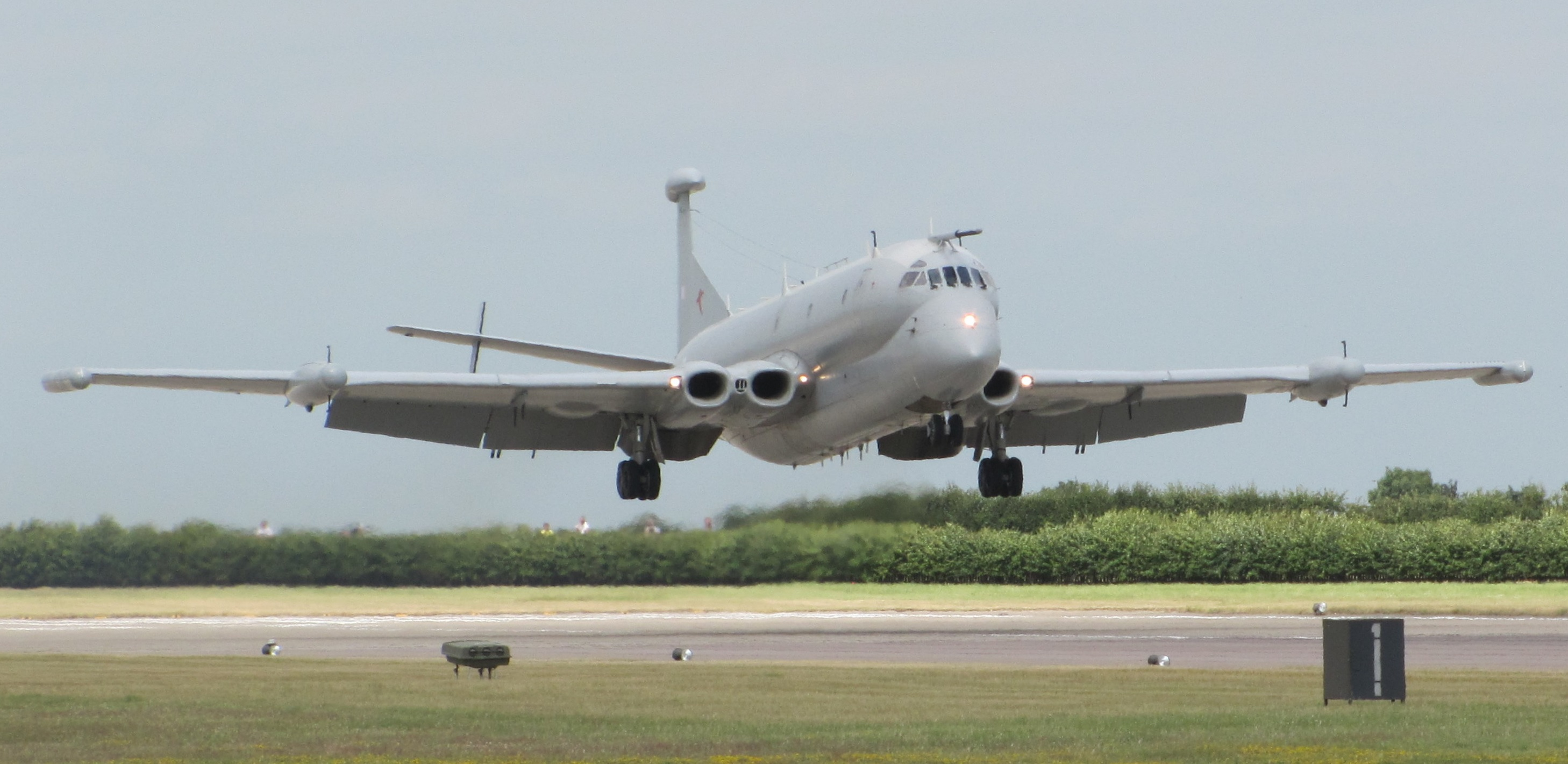
A Hawker-Siddeley Nimrod R1 of No. 51 Squadron lands during the 2010 Waddington International Airshow

The squadron again reformed in the 'Special Duties' role when No. 192 Squadron RAF was renumbered at RAF Watton on 21 August 1958, moving to nearby Wyton in April 1963. It was only following the end of the Cold War that the signals intelligence role of the squadron was publicly recognised. Signals intelligence encompasses both Electronic Intelligence (Elint) and Communications Intelligence (Comint). The squadron flew this role using de Havilland Comets. The Comets were replaced by a modified version of the Hawker-Siddeley Nimrod in 1974.

One of the three Nimrods on strength was retired at the end of November 2009 with the other two remaining in service until June 2011. The Nimrods were replaced by three Boeing RC-135W Rivet Joint aircraft. In January 2011 personnel from No. 51 Squadron began training at Offutt Air Force Base in the US for conversion to the RC-135. Crews were to be deployed on joint missions with the USAF 343rd Reconnaissance Squadron until the new aircraft became available. The first RC135W (ZZ664) was delivered to the Royal Air Force on 12 November 2013, and entered operational service in 2014, taking part in Operation Shader against ISIL in Iraq and Syria.

== Aircraft operated ==
Aircraft operated have included:

- Royal Aircraft Factory B.E.2
- Royal Aircraft Factory B.E.12
- FE2b
- Martinsyde G.100
- Avro 504K
- Sopwith Camel
- Vickers Virginia Mk10
- Avro Anson Mk1
- Armstrong Whitworth Whitley Mk2–Mk5
- Handley Page Halifax Mk2 and Mk3
- Short Stirling Mk5
- Avro York
- de Havilland Comet Mk2R
- English Electric Canberra B2
- Handley Page Hastings C1
- Hawker Siddeley Nimrod R1
- Boeing RC-135W Rivet Joint

== Heritage ==
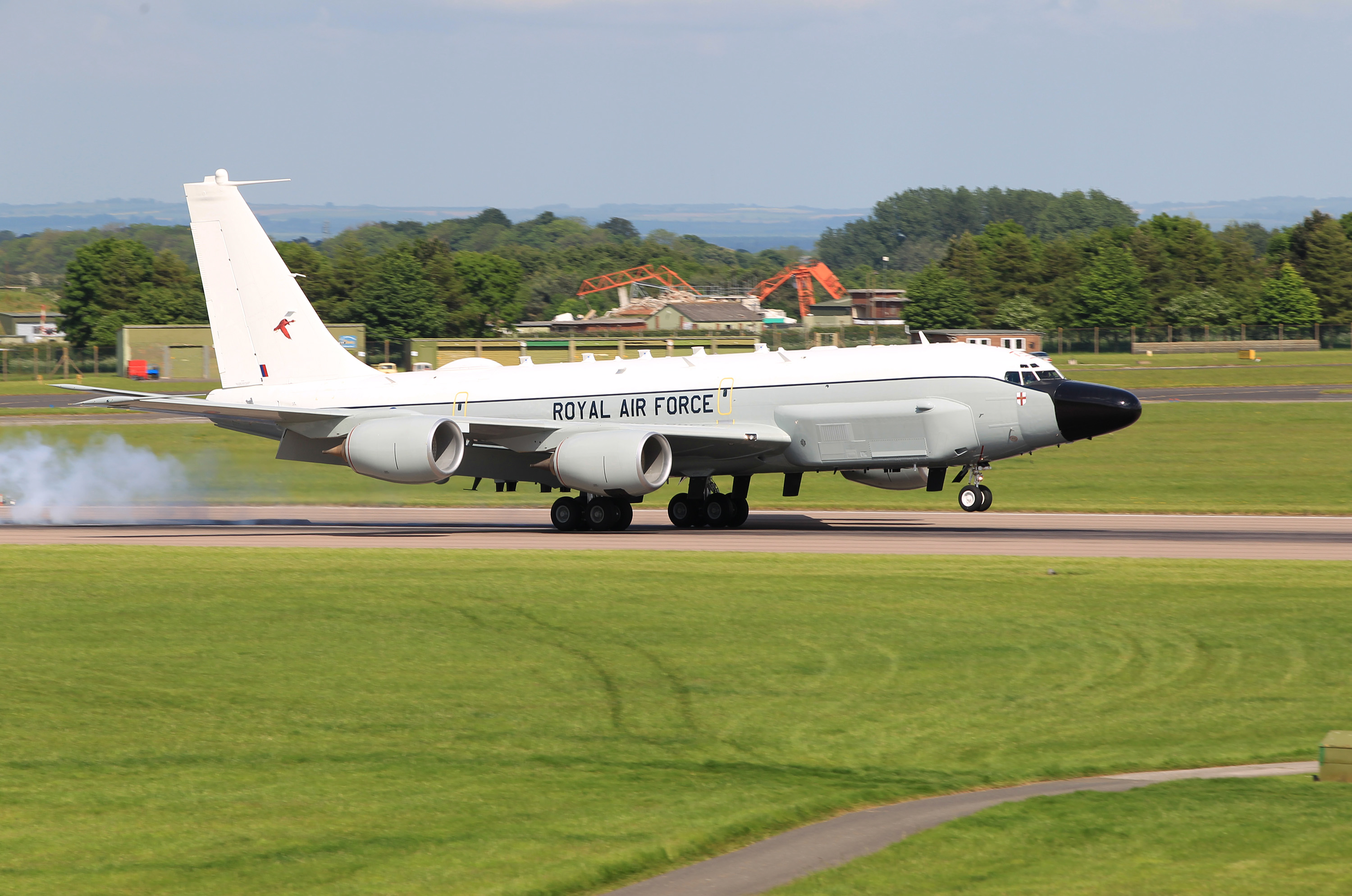
An RAF Boeing RC-135W Rivet Joint aircraft seen landing at RAF Waddington in 2014

The squadron's badge features a goose volant, chosen as a play on the word 'Anson', the aircraft which the squadron was flying when the badge was being designed, as 'Anser' is the Latin word for Goose. The goose is a fast day and night flyer, flying in a ‘V’ formation as a protective measure and it was felt that a heavy wild fowl was appropriate for a bomber squadron. It was approved by King George VI in December 1937.

The squadron's motto is Swift and Sure.

== Battle honours ==
No. 51 Squadron has received the following battle honours. Those marked with an asterisk (*) may be emblazoned on the squadron standard.

- Home Defence (1916–1918)*
- Channel and North Sea (1940–1943)
- Norway (1940)*
- France and Low Countries (1940)
- Ruhr (1940–1945)*
- Fortress Europe (1940–1944)
- German Ports (1940–1945)
- Invasion Ports (1940)
- Biscay Ports (1940–1944)
- Berlin 1940–1944
- Baltic 1940–1944*
- Biscay 1942
- Italy (1943)*
- France and Germany (1944–1945)*
- Normandy (1944)
- Walcheren
- Rhine
- South Atlantic 1982
- Gulf (1991)
- Kosovo
- Iraq (2003–2011)
- Libya (2011)

== See also ==
- List of Royal Air Force aircraft squadrons
