= Battle of Berlin (RAF campaign) =

Bomber attacks, 1943–44, WWII

- Part of the bombing of Berlin during the strategic bombing of Germany during the Second World War
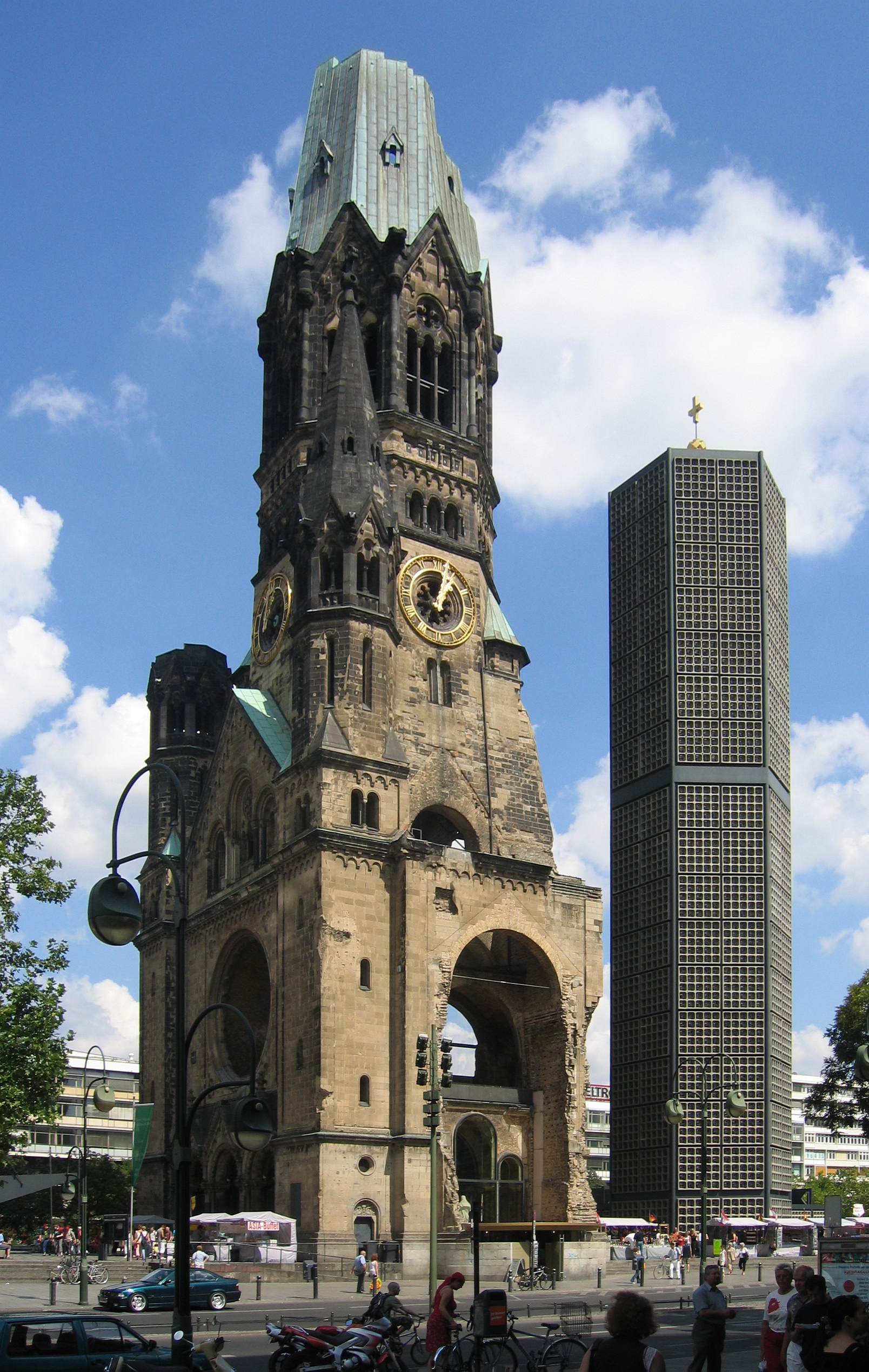
- The ruins of the Kaiser Wilhelm Memorial Church which was hit on 23 November 1943
Date	18 November 1943 – 31 March 1944
Location	Berlin, Nazi Germany 52°31′N 13°25′E
Result	German victory

Belligerents
United Kingdom; Canada; Australia; New Zealand; Poland	Germany

Commanders and leaders
Arthur Harris	Hermann Göring

Casualties and losses
Bomber Command; 2,690 crew killed; c. 1,000 POW; 500 aircraft (5.8 per cent loss rate)	c. 4,000 civilians killed; 10,000 injured; 450,000 homeless; 256 night fighters

The Battle of Berlin (November 1943 to March 1944) was a bombing campaign against Berlin by RAF Bomber Command, along with raids on other German cities to keep German defences dispersed. The attacks were a part of the bombing of Berlin during the strategic bombing of Germany in the Second World War. Air Chief Marshal Arthur Harris, Air Officer Commanding-in-Chief (AOC-in-C) Bomber Command, believed that "we can wreck Berlin from end to end if the USAAF come in with us. It will cost us between 400 and 500 aircraft. It will cost Germany the war".

Harris could expect about 800 serviceable heavy bombers for each raid, equipped with new and sophisticated navigation devices such as H2S radar. The United States Army Air Forces (USAAF), having recently lost many aircraft in attacks on Schweinfurt, did not participate. The Main Force of Bomber Command attacked Berlin sixteen times but failed in its object of inflicting a decisive defeat on Germany. The Royal Air Force lost more than 7,000 aircrew and 1,047 bombers (5.1 per cent of the sorties flown) 1,682 aircraft were damaged or written off. On 30 March 1944, Bomber Command attacked Nuremberg with 795 aircraft, 94 were shot down and 71 were damaged. The Luftwaffe I. Jagdkorps recorded the loss of 256 night fighters from November 1943 to March 1944.

The Luftwaffe retaliated with Unternehmen Steinbock (Operation Capricorn) against London and other British cities from January to May 1944. The Luftwaffe managed to assemble a force of 524 bombers but Steinbock caused little damage for the loss of 329 aircraft, a greater percentage loss per raid and in total than that suffered by Bomber Command over Germany. There were many other raids on Berlin by the RAF, the US Eighth Air Force and Soviet bombers. The RAF was granted a battle honour for the bombardment of Berlin by aircraft of Bomber Command from 1940 to 1945.

== Background ==
=== Bomber Command ===
In 1942 some answers to the chronic problems of night navigation and target finding suffered by Bomber Command began to emerge but the number of bombers had stagnated. In November 1941 Bomber Command had a daily average of 506 bombers available and in January 1943 the average was 515. To carry out the thousand-bomber raids, Bomber Command drew on crews and aircraft from the Operational Training Units, a practice that could not become routine because of its disruption of the training system. Navigation had been helped by the introduction of Gee but this device lacked accuracy for bombing through the dark and smog of the Ruhr, lacked range and from 4 August 1942 the Germans began to jam the device. The Pathfinder Force (PFF) was established on 15 August 1942 but with Gee jammed and no target indicator bombs to mark the aiming point for the rest of the bombers (the Main Force), the task of the PFF varied from thankless to impossible. Despite its problems, Bomber Command had been able to achieve some spectacular results but these had been isolated events and due to favourable circumstances as well as judgement. The loss of 1,404 aircraft and 2,724 damaged to German night defences of increasing quantity and quality, especially German night fighters (Nachtjäger) had become a serious threat to the viability of the command and of strategic bombing as a theory of war.

In 1942 Bomber Command had created 19 new squadrons but 13 had been transferred to other commands. The quantity of aircraft had barely increased but a big improvement in quality had been achieved. Bristol Blenheim light bombers and Armstrong Whitworth Whitley medium bombers had been retired from the command in mid-1942, followed by the Handley Page Hampden medium bomber in September. The disappointments of the Short Stirling and the early Handley Page Halifax variants and the fiasco of the Avro Manchester, withdrawn in June 1942, was balanced by the Avro Lancaster, which made its operational début in March and demonstrated its superiority over all other bombers. (Note: The Lancaster was a redesigned Manchester with a greater wingspan and four of the excellent and tested Rolls-Royce Merlin XX engines, instead of two more powerful but unreliable Rolls-Royce Vulture engines.) Re-equipment with new types of aircraft led to an average of 16.36 per cent of Bomber Command squadrons withdrawn from operations for conversion onto new aircraft in 1942, against 3.3 per cent in 1943. On 1 January 1942 the command had 48 squadrons, 9 with heavy bombers, 34 with medium and five with light bombers (Blenheims). On 1 January 1943, there were 49 squadrons, 32 heavy, 11 medium and six light (de Havilland Mosquito). The command had flown 30,508 operational sorties in 1941 and dropped 31,646 long tons (32,154 t) of bombs, in 1942 it dropped 45,501 long tons (46,231 t) from 29,929 sorties.

==== Gee ====
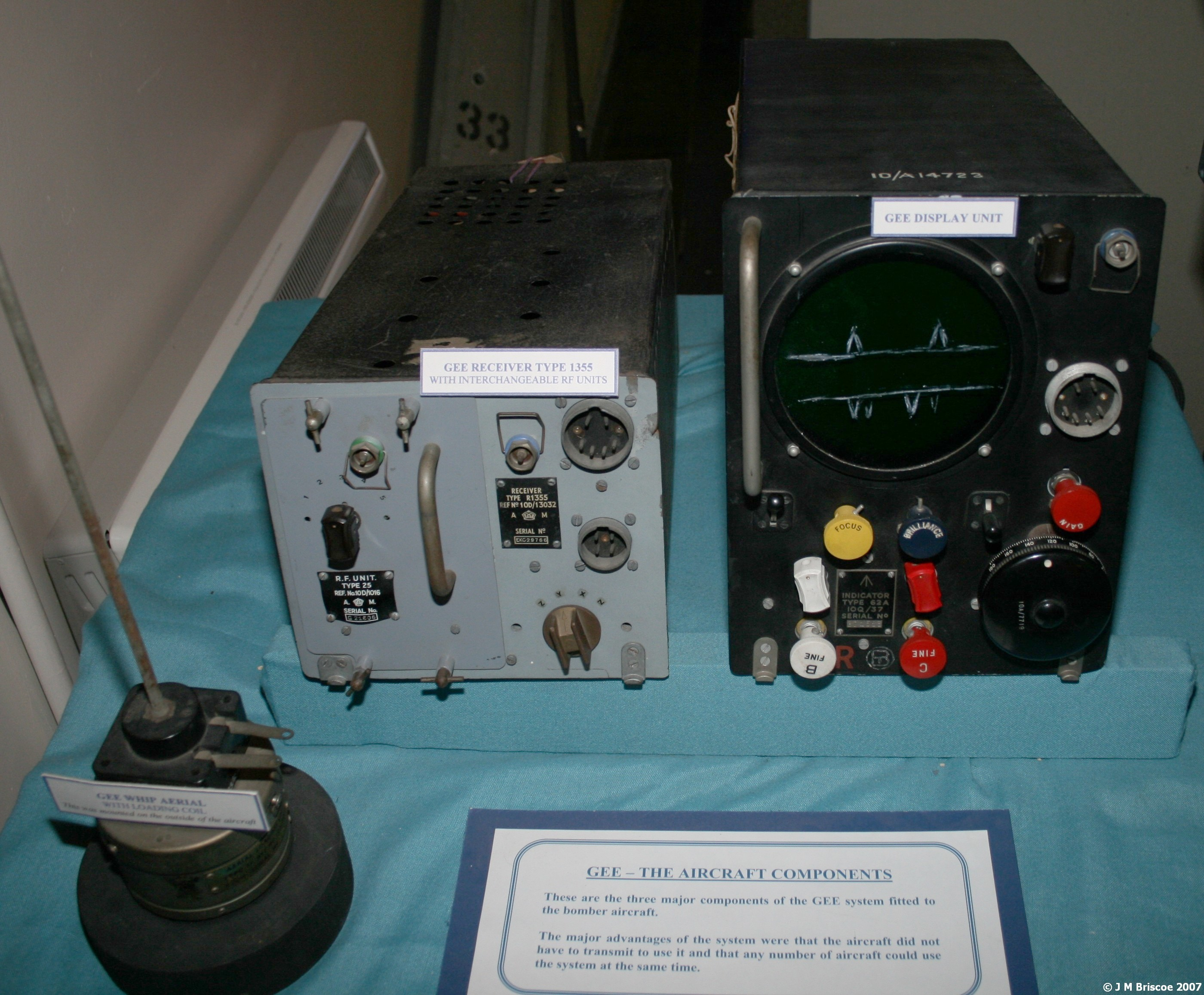
GEE airborne equipment, with the R1355 receiver on the left and the Indicator Unit Type 62A on the right

Gee worked by wireless signals transmitted from three ground stations in England, on a line about 200 mi (320 km) long, being displayed on a cathode ray tube to the navigator and placed on a Gee chart, giving a fix of the aircraft's position in less than a minute. Accuracy varied from 0.5 to 5 mi (0.80 to 8.05 km) and Gee had a range of 300–400 mi (480–640 km), accuracy falling with distance. Gee worked well as a homing device but early hopes of it being accurate enough for blind bombing were not realised. Crews appreciated the value of the apparatus for navigation on the return journey, removing the fear of flying into hills and other obstructions. By August 1942, 80 per cent of the bomber force was equipped and 100 per cent by January 1943.

The Ruhr Valley was covered by the eastern chain and later northern and southern chains were added. Gee was usually ineffective east of the Ruhr and was easy to jam, which began on 4 August 1942, from when Gee fixes were only obtainable over the North Sea and parts of France. Gee lost accuracy with distance and this made it a better target-finding device for Luftwaffe raiders over Britain. The signals were encoded to prevent German use but this made it harder for Bomber Command navigators to get Gee fixes. Anti-jamming devices were short-lived in effectiveness as the Germans quickly overcame them but Gee Mk II was easier for navigators to use.

==== Oboe ====
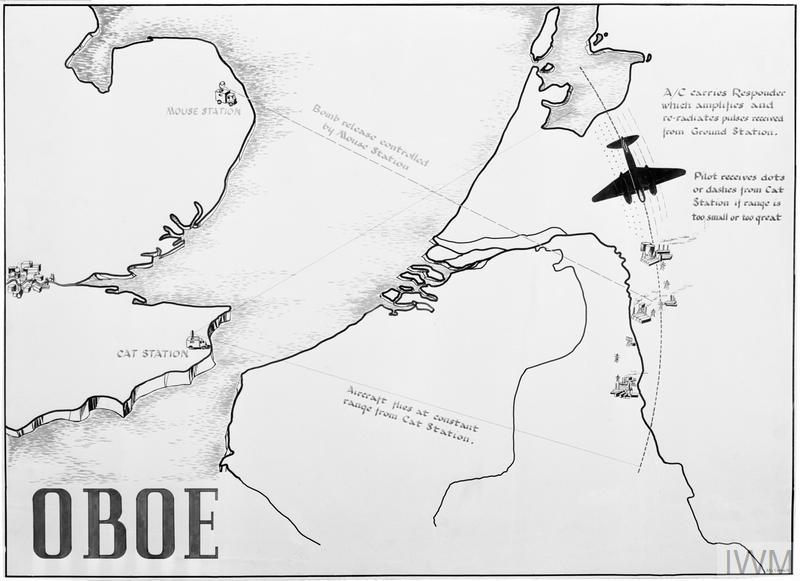
Diagram of the operation of the Oboe system

Oboe was a blind-bombing device controlled by two ground stations in England which measured the distance of an aircraft from them with radar pulses. The ground station known as Cat tracked the aircraft over the target and the ground station known as Mouse calculated the point on the track where the aircraft should bomb. Oboe transmissions did not follow the curvature of the Earth, making the altitude of the aircraft the determinant of range. An aircraft flying at 28,000 ft (8,500 m) could receive Oboe transmissions at about 270 mi (430 km), enough to mark targets in the Ruhr, which led to the device being installed in fast, high-flying Mosquito bombers, which usually navigated with the usual aids until beginning an Oboe run about 10 mi (16 km) from the target. Use of the Mosquito made an Oboe run safer, even when no evasive action could be taken before bombing. Accuracy was measured in hundreds of yards which increased with greater experience of the aircrews and ground operators.

Oboe could be jammed and suffer interference from Monica and other Bomber Command devices. Oboe Mark (Mk) I operated on a frequency of 1.5 metres. K Oboe, less prone to jamming, came in general use from mid-June 1943; centimetric Oboe Mk II (10 cm) and Mk III, using the cavity magnetron, retained the effectiveness of Oboe until the end of the war. Rushing Oboe Mk I into service delayed Mk II but jamming did not begin until August 1943. Cat and Mouse stations could handle only one aircraft at a time and a marking run took ten minutes, allowing six bomb- or marker-runs per hour. The illumination from a Target Indicator bomb usually lasted for six minutes, guaranteeing four-minute gaps in marking. A failed marking run increased the gap to fourteen minutes. The introduction of multi-channel control and more ground stations eventually increased the concentration of Oboe marking. From the introduction of Oboe in December 1942 until the end of the war, Oboe aircraft made 9,624 sorties on 1,797 raids.

By 1943, for the first time since day bombing was abandoned in 1940, Bomber Command was released from the constraints occasioned by the adoption of night bombing. The tactical use of the new devices was developed quickly but the new equipment had limitations. Oboe had a range which was little beyond the Ruhr and research on repeater aircraft to extend its range was stopped because H2S was expected to be a better system and only a few aircraft could use the device simultaneously; although Oboe had the potential for a vast improvement in target finding, it was not of pinpoint accuracy. H2S could be installed on any aircraft but was complicated, difficult to use and emitted radiation which could be detected, paradoxically exposing the aircraft to interception. Gee remained useful as a means of navigation on return journeys but required development to overcome German jamming.

==== Target Indicator bomb ====
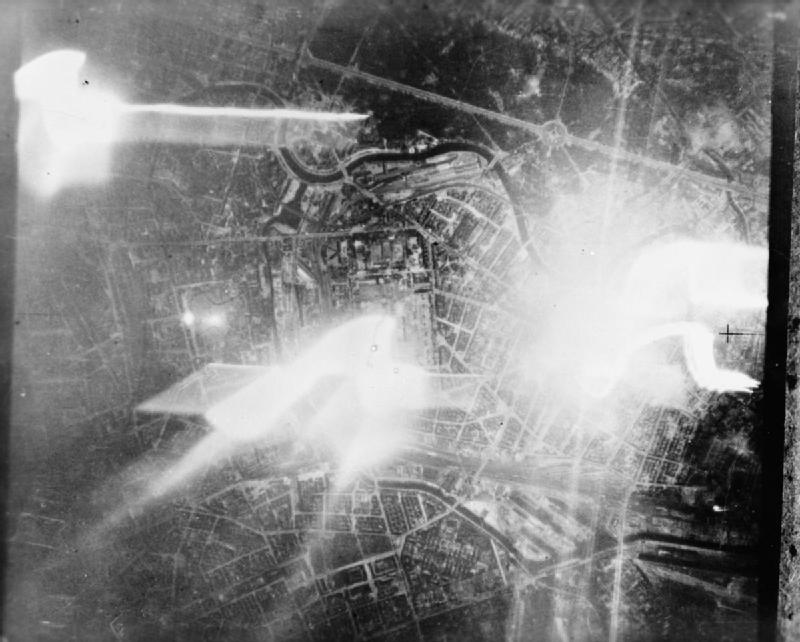
German searchlights and a Target Indicator (on the right) light up Berlin

The Target Indicator bomb (TI) was an aerodynamic metal case which ejected coloured pyrotechnic candles at a set height by a barometric fuze. If set to ignite immediately they made a cascade. When sky marking, the candles were on parachutes and if fuzed for ground burst, they created a pool of coloured fire. The usual 250 lb (110 kg) TI covered an area on the ground of about 100 yd (91 m) and a ground burst TI contained some candles which were explosive, to deter attempts to extinguish them. The TI was introduced on the night of 16/17 January 1943 and was a great success, making pathfinding a practical operation of war.

==== H2S ====
H2S was a device for navigation and blind bombing by radar. The emissions of the radar were reflected and received as echoes which were distinctive of the earth below. Built-up areas returned echoes different from fields and forests, land echoes could be distinguished from the sea and sea echoes from those of a ship. The radar had a scanner which swept vertically and the echoes were detected by a receiver and displayed on a cathode-ray tube, with a sweep rotating at the same speed as the scanner, giving an impression of the earth below. The contrast between water and land made coasts, lakes and rivers particularly recognisable. Towns also stood out and sometimes railway lines, from which the navigator could determine his position. When closer to the target, if it was recognisable, an H2S bombing run could be made; if the target could not be distinguished the bomber could make a timed run from a landmark in the vicinity. Since the device was airborne its range was limited only to that of its aircraft. The apparatus was limited by echoes from towns and cities, which were harder to distinguish than those from countryside and town.

H2S was inferior to Oboe for blind bombing except on coastal targets like Hamburg. A transmitter carried by the aircraft, it was inevitable that H2S would be disclosed to the Germans from parts had been recovered from shot-down bombers and its characteristics analysed. German detectors could find a bomber stream and direct night-fighters into it. Once Bomber Command began to use centimetric H2S in January 1943, it was inevitable that the Germans would retrieve one from a crashed bomber and realise that it was similar to air-to-surface-vessel radar (ASV) used by Coastal Command to detect surfaced submarines. In October 1943, the Germans introduced the Naxos radar detector in night-fighters and U-boats. By mid-January 1943, only 10 Halifax bombers and 13 Stirlings carried H2S; the rate of production was slow and by May 1943, no more than 18 H2S-equipped bombers had participated in one raid; by August, 840 H2S sets had been manufactured.

=== German air defences ===
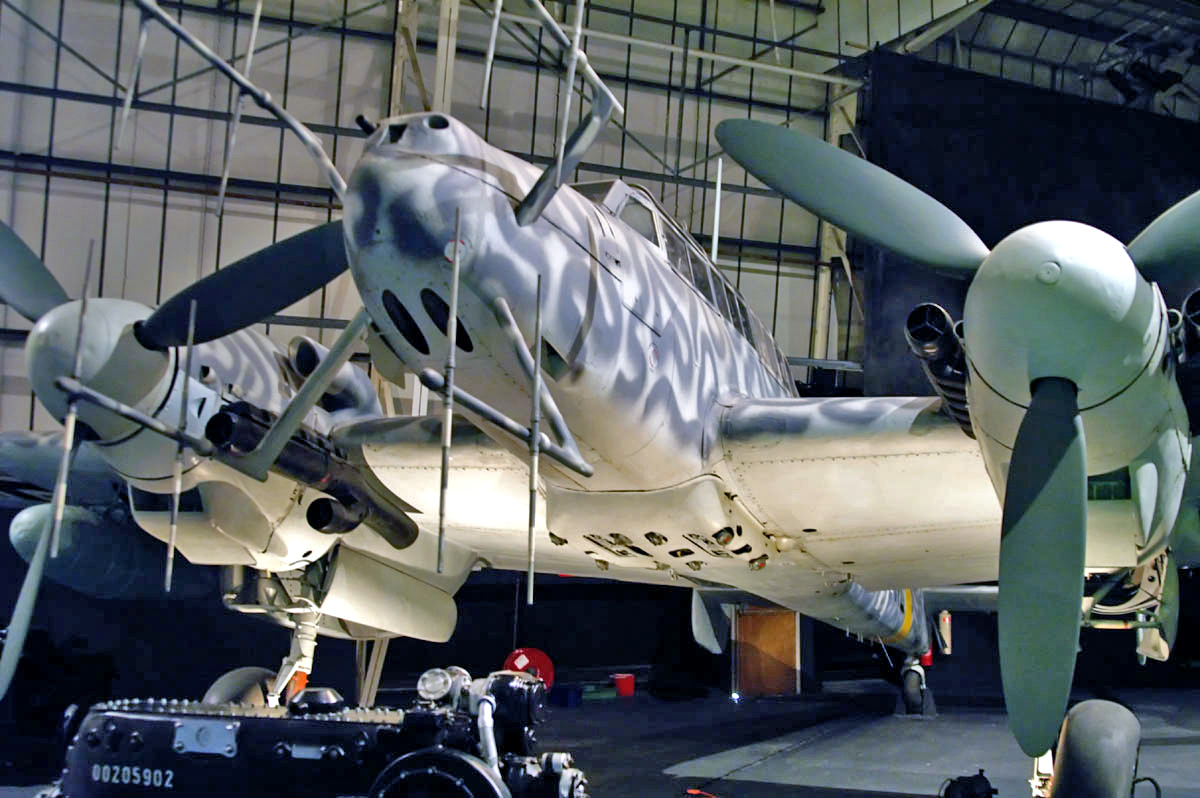
Messerchmitt Bf 110G-4 night fighter on display at RAF Hendon

The threat of Anglo-American strategic bombing had been a concern to German strategists since 1940 at the latest. After the Fall of France, a belt of Freya radar stations was built to give early warning of aircraft entering German-controlled airspace, from Denmark south to Switzerland. Freya lacked the accuracy needed for ground-controlled interception of aircraft and was supplemented later in 1940 by Würzburg radar stations which were accurate enough to guide FlaK and night fighters, a Würzburg-guided FlaK battery shooting down a bomber in September 1940. In October Oberst (Colonel) Josef Kammhuber established three night-fighter zones on the approaches to the Ruhr. The zones were 56 mi (90 km) long and 12 mi (19 km) wide, with a battalion of searchlights and two Würzburg radars in each.

A night-fighter could be guided to within 55 yd (50 m) of an aircraft and then attack when the aircraft was illuminated by the searchlights, a procedure called Helle Nachtjagd (Henaja [Illuminated night fighting]). Forward zones were established along the coast, without searchlights, known as Dunkel Nachtjagd (Dunaja [Dark Nightfighting]). The system lacked effectiveness on cloudy nights, the range of the Würzburg radar [6–31 mi (9.7–49.9 km)] was too short and it could not identify friend or foe, which led occasionally to attacks on friendly night fighters; some night fighter crews disliked ground control for the loss of flexibility. The German system had not been centralised to sift the information provided by radar, searchlights, wireless interception and direction finding to co-ordinate FlaK and night-fighters. To the end of 1940, the new system was credited with the shooting down of 42 bombers by night fighters and 30 by FlaK. (Note: Data from Freya sets went to the navy (Kriegsmarine) and the Luftwaffe; the Luftwaffe forwarded it to Luftflotten (Air Fleets) and to Luftgaue (Air Districts, commanding the FlaK) and to the Reichsluftfahrtministerium (RLM, Air Ministry) in Berlin.)

Map of a section of the Kammhuber Line stolen by Agent Tegal

The system was extended with a line of Henaja about 20 mi (32 km) wide which, by March 1941, ran 430 mi (690 km) from the Danish–German frontier to Maubeuge in France. Another Henaja belt 45 mi (72 km) long was built between Frankfurt and Mannheim later in the year. Three Würzburg guided the searchlights to illuminate bombers as they entered the zone. Dunaja were extended in circumference and the chain was extended along the coasts of France and the Low Countries and around Berlin. Late in 1941 an improved Würzburg with a 50 mi (80 km)-range and the Seeburg plotting table (Seeburg-Tisch) came into service. Kammhuber used the new equipment to revise the night defence system by increasing the width of Henaja from 25–60 mi (40–97 km) with Dunaja in front of them. Kammhuber intended to introduce Dunaja behind the Kammhuber Line, placed Freya stations on either side and installed master searchlights. The system was introduced in September but proved to be too complex and the number of interceptions decreased.

In the spring of 1942 the depth of the belt of searchlights was reduced to 6 mi (9.7 km) and widened to 12 mi (19 km). A new Konaja (combined) method was intended to counter the new and faster four-engined bombers coming into service with Bomber Command but the risk of the FlaK shooting down night-fighters was too great and the system was a failure. In 1941, Bomber Command losses rose to 3.6 per cent from the 2.9 per cent of 1940. During a raid on Berlin on the night of 7/8 November, 12.4 per cent of the 169 bombers were shot down. The night-fighter force shot down 433 bombers and by the end of the year, nine Gruppen and one Staffel were in action. The confused and overlapping jurisdictions of the German defence against night attacks were exacerbated by the lack of effectiveness of the British night bomber offensive and this complacency was not shaken by the declaration of war on the United States in December.

Because of the diversion of night-fighters to the Eastern front and the Mediterranean, by February 1942, there were 265 night-fighters in the west, of an establishment of 367, only half of which were operational. The British resorted to a deliberate campaign of area bombing which immediately increased the amount of destruction achieved by Bomber Command. The bomb tonnage increased from 37,000 long tons (38,000 t) in 1941 to 50,000 long tons (51,000 t) in 1942. The German night defence was not prepared for the change in British methods and the introduction of GEE, the first night navigation aid. The British ended the individual timing of bomber sorties in favour of the concentration of all the bombers in space and time, which made most of the Kammhuber Line redundant, leaving only a few fighters able to attack the bombers. On the 1,000-bomber raid on Cologne, the bombers spent only two hours over Europe, the stream was 18 mi (29 km) wide and only 25 night-fighters could engage the bombers, just over ten per cent of the total; bomber losses fell from 3.6 to 3.0 per cent. In 1942, Bomber Command had been able to inflict considerable damage on several occasions but had failed consistently to disrupt the German war economy.

==== Himmelbett ====
During 1942, the night-fighter command organisation Fliegerkorps XII abolished its Nachtjagddivision for three Jagddivisionen on 1 May and by February 1943, 477 night-fighters were available from an establishment of 653, of which 330 were operational, double that of 1942, 90 per cent of which were in the west. Nearly all of the night-fighters carried Lichtenstein, an aircraft interception (AI) radar, with a maximum range of 3,000 yd (2,700 m) and a minimum range of 20 yd (18 m), sufficient to track a bomber after ground control had brought the night-fighter to within 2 mi (3.2 km). Despite the weight of the apparatus and aerodynamic penalty of its aerial array causing a loss of at least 25 mph (40 km/h) in speed, night-fighter interceptions increased to the extent that searchlight illumination was made redundant and the lights were transferred to the local FlaK units around cities. By June the Kammhuber Line had been extended southwards towards Paris and northwards to the north coast of Denmark.

Kammhuber refused to allow night-fighters to roam freely but made the line more flexible, by deepening the Dunaja zone to 124 mi (200 km) either side of the Henaja to exploit the increased range of Freya and Würzburg, which created the Himmelbett system. In each sector, one Würzburg tracked the bomber and another the night-fighter until it was close enough for the crew to use its Lichtenstein AI for the attack. A zone was limited to one night-fighter but they overlapped by 50 per cent, enabling three night-fighters to operate in one area. GEE was jammed from August, limiting its usefulness to no further than the European coast. Much of the airspace of Europe remained undefended and bomber streams made all but a few night-fighters ineffective, which limited the capacity of German night defences to shoot down no more than about 6 per cent of Bomber Command sorties.

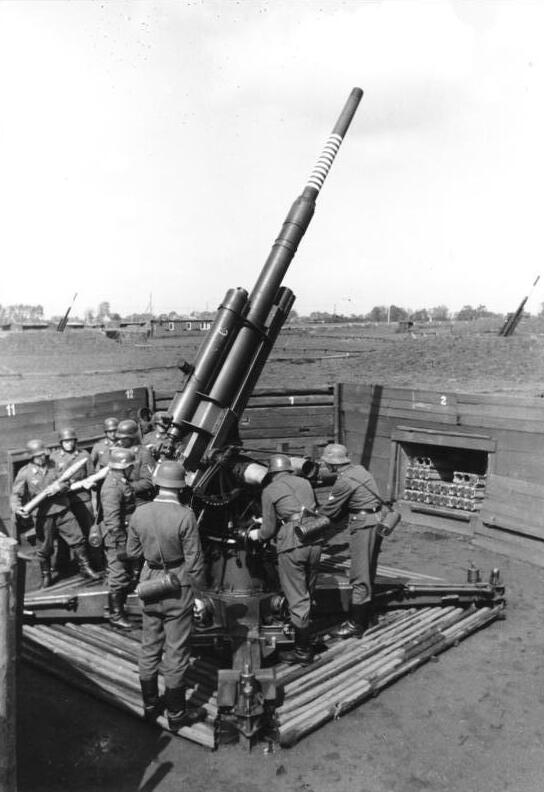
88 mm FlaK battery in firing position

The German night defences managed to shoot down 687 bombers in 1942, 63 per cent more than in 1941 for a loss of 97 night-fighters, 63 per cent more than in 1941 and on 10 September Fliegerkorps XII shot down its 1,000th bomber, 649 by Dunaja, 200 by Henaja, 140 by intruder operations over Britain and 11 bombers crashed after being blinded by searchlights. Night-fighters and FlaK were shooting down an average of 5.6 per cent of Bomber Command aircraft per raid by the autumn. The performance of FlaK also showed an improvement, from July to August 1942, Bomber Command reported the loss of 696 bombers, 269 thought to have been destroyed by night-fighters, 193 by FlaK and 334 loses to unknown causes; 1,394 aircraft were damaged, 153 were hit by night-fighters and 941 by FlaK.

By the end of the year, the Luftwaffe had faced 77,500 night sorties, shooting down 2,859 bombers, a rate of 3.6 per cent and damaged far more bombers. In 1940 Bomber Command lost a bomber crashed in Britain for every 32 sorties and in 1942 the rate had increased to one in twenty. To the end of 1942, the Luftwaffe had dropped 67,000 long tons (68,000 t) of bombs on Britain and the RAF had dropped 78,579 long tons (79,840 t) on Germany and 22,537 long tons (22,899 t) on the occupied territories. According to post-war research by the Allies, bombing cut German production by 0.7 to 2.5 per cent in 1942, compared to the devotion of 33 per cent of the British war economy to the bomber offensive.

Despite the big increase in the German anti-aircraft effort, such concern for the future as existed did not prevent 150 FlaK batteries from being transferred to Italy. Only the Generalluftzeugmeister, Erhard Milch, in charge of Luftwaffe aircraft production, foresaw the crisis that would ensue if fighter output was not given greater emphasis. The advent of British four-engined bombers had increased by 70 per cent the bomb tonnage carried by Bomber Command. Milch predicted that the Anglo-American air fleets would swamp the German air defences and destroy the war economy. On 21 March 1942, Milch advocated to Reichsmarshall Hermann Göring, commander in chief of the Luftwaffe and Hans Jeschonnek, the chief of staff of Oberkommando der Luftwaffe (High Command of the Air Force) the creation of an air umbrella. Milch told Goering that his target of 360 new fighters per month would be insufficient even if it were increased to 3,600, which Jeschonnek dismissed by saying that he would not know what to do with 360 new fighters a month. During the spring of 1943, the Germans increased the ground anti-aircraft defences in the Ruhr; by July there were more than 1,000 large FlaK (anti-aircraft guns of 88 mm or larger) and 1,500 lighter guns (most being 20 mm and 37 mm) about a third of the anti-aircraft guns in Germany, which needed 600,000 men, women and boys to operate.

== Battle ==
The first Bomber Command raid of the battle occurred on the night of 18/19 November 1943. Berlin was attacked by 440 Lancaster heavy bombers of the Main Force and four de Havilland Mosquitos but the city was under cloud and the damage was not severe. The second raid by the Main Force took place on the night of 22/23 November. This was the most effective raid on Berlin by the RAF of the war, causing extensive damage to the residential areas west of the centre, Tiergarten and Charlottenburg, Schöneberg and Spandau. Because of dry weather, several firestorms ignited. The Protestant Kaiser Wilhelm Memorial Church, now a war memorial and the New Synagogue (used as a store house by the Wehrmacht) were badly damaged in the raid.

In the next nights, further attacks followed, damaging or destroying Bethlehem's Church, John's Church, Lietzow Church, Trinity Church, Emperor Frederick Memorial Church, Kirche am Hohenzollernplatz and St. Hedwig's Cathedral. Several other buildings of note were either destroyed or damaged, including the British, French, Italian and Japanese embassies, Charlottenburg Palace, Berlin Zoo, the Ministry of Munitions, the Waffen SS Administrative College, the barracks of the Imperial Guard at Spandau and several arms factories.

On 17 December, extensive damage was done to the Berlin railway system. By this time the cumulative effect of the bombing campaign had made more than a quarter of Berlin's living accommodation unusable. There was another Main Force raid on the night of 28/29 January 1944, when the western and southern districts were hit in the most concentrated attack of this period. On 15/16 February, important war industries were hit, including the large Siemensstadt area in the west, with the centre and south-western districts receiving most of the damage. This was the largest raid by the RAF on Berlin; the campaign continued until March 1944.

== Aftermath ==
=== Analysis ===
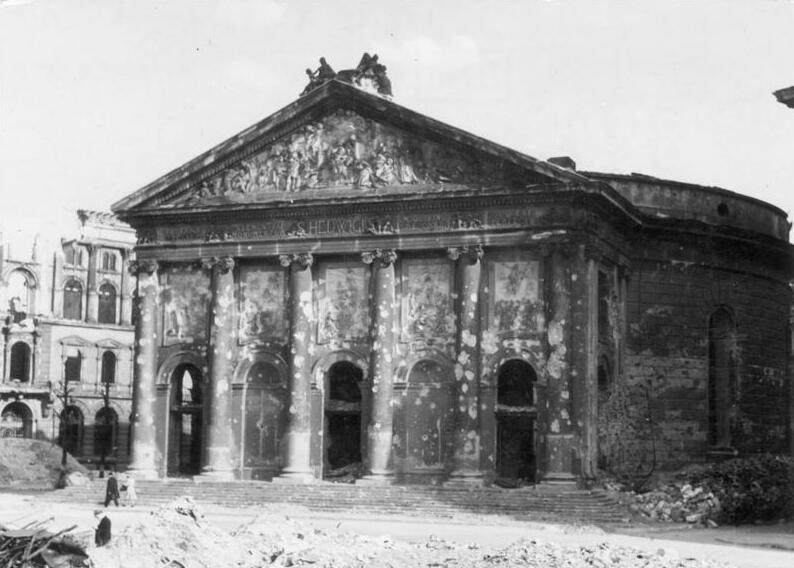
The ruins of St. Hedwig's Cathedral, 1946

In 1961, the British official historians, Charles Webster and Noble Frankland wrote that Bomber Command sent 16 raids comprising 9,111 sorties against Berlin. The attacks cost 492 aircraft, their crews killed or captured and 954 aircraft damaged, a rate of loss of 5.8 per cent, exceeding the 5 per cent threshold that was considered by the RAF to be the maximum sustainable operational loss rate. The Battle of Berlin diverted German military resources from the land war and had an economic effect in physical damage, worker fatalities and injuries, relocation and fortification of industrial buildings and other infrastructure but by 1 April 1944, the campaign had failed to force a German capitulation,

...in the operational sense the Battle of Berlin was more than a failure, it was a defeat....The Battle of Berlin compared unfavourably with the preceding Battles of the Ruhr and of Hamburg and the campaign on the road to Berlin.

In 2005, Kevin Wilson wrote that, despite the devastation of Berlin, the British raids failed to achieve their objectives. The bombing prevented increases in German production and caused resources to be diverted from offensive to defensive purposes but German civilian morale did not break. The Berlin defences and essential services were maintained and war production in greater Berlin did not fall.

In 2006, Adam Tooze, an economic historian, wrote that the British bombing of Hamburg in July 1943 appeared to vindicate the hopes of the British leaders in Bomber Command, that it had become a decisive weapon and that the theory of strategic bombing had been proved. Bomber Command was only able to emulate the Hamburg firestorm of 28 July once, at Kassel in October. In the winter of 1943, the attacks on Berlin began, which Tooze called fruitless,

The Ruhr was the choke point and in 1943 it was within the RAF's grip. The failure to maintain that hold and to tighten it was a tragic operational error.

Berlin was a big manufacturing city but the Ruhr was the principal supplier of coal and steel to Germany. Isolating the Ruhr could strangle the rest of the German war economy; in the campaign against Berlin, the British caused much damage but the evolution of German anti-aircraft defences, particularly night fighters, was able to counter the Bomber Command threat on its long flights to Berlin in winter weather.

=== German casualties ===
In 1982, Laurenz Demps collated loss data using the damage reports of the Berlin police commissioner (Polizeipräsident) issued after each air raid, descriptions of losses and damage indicated by houses and distributed to 100–150 organisations and administrations busy with rescue, repair, planning and other matters, against reports of the main bureau for air raid protection (Hauptluftschutzstelle) of the city of Berlin, which issued more than 100 copies with variable frequency, each summarising losses and damage by the number of air raids; the war diary of the air raid warning command (Luftwarnkommando – (Wako Berlin), a branch of the Luftwaffe and other sources. Demps wrote that 7,480 people had been killed, 2,194 people were reported missing, 17,092 were injured and 817,730 Berliners made homeless. In 2003, Reinhard Rürup wrote that nearly 4,000 people were killed, 10,000 injured and 450,000 made homeless. In 2005, Kevin Wilson described the effects of smoke and dust in the air from the bombing and how long periods spent in shelters gave rise to symptoms that were called cellar influenza (Kellergrippe). In 2006, A. C. Grayling wrote that the campaign caused immense loss of life and devastation in Berlin. The 22 November 1943 raid killed 2,000 Berliners and rendered 175,000 homeless. The following night, 1,000 people were killed and 100,000 bombed out. During December and January, Main Force raids killed hundreds of people and rendered between 20,000 and 80,000 homeless each night.

== Chronology ==
The campaign comprised sixteen Main Force raids on Berlin, sixteen against other targets in Germany and raids on targets in occupied Europe. Bomber Command conducted other strategic operations such as night-fighter and intruder operations against the German night-fighter force, minelaying, nuisance raids and training sorties.

=== November 1943 ===
- Night of 18/19 November 1943, Bomber Command had 513 Avro Lancasters, 271 Handley Page Halifaxes, 137 Short Stirlings, 23 Vickers Wellingtons and 46 de Havilland Mosquitos operational. Bomber Command sent a force of 440 Lancasters to Berlin, 1 Group squadrons provided 153, 3 Group 12, 5 Group182, 6 Group (RCAF) 29 and 8 (Pathfinder Force) Group 64 Lancasters and four Mosquitos to drop spoof fighter flares; 26 Lancasters returned early (5.9 per cent). The raid opened at 20:56 and ended at 21:12; about 1,575 long tons (1,600 t) of bombs, approximately 792 long tons (805 t) high explosive and 783 long tons (796 t) incendiary were dropped. Losses were nine Lancasters (2.0 per cent) with 43 crew killed, 20 taken prisoner and four evading capture. The Berlin police chief reported 154 people killed, 443 injured and 7,500 people bombed out; he estimated that the raid lasted from 20:11 to 22:23 comprising 11 mines, 75 high explosive bombs, 1,600 incendiaries, 940 phosphorus bombs and 36 flares.

A diversionary raid against Ludwigshafen was carried out by 395 bombers (248 Halifaxes, 114 Stirlings and 33 Lancasters); 23 aircraft lost, twelve Halifaxes, nine Stirlings and two Lancasters (5.8 per cent). Ten Mosquitos to Essen, 6 to Aachen, 6 to Frankfurt, 16 Wellington minelayer sorties from Texel to St Nazaire and 7 OTU sorties for no loss. RAF effort 884 sorties 32 losses (3.6 per cent).

- Night of 19/20 November 1943, 266 aircraft to Leverkusen, 170 Halifaxes, 86 Stirlings, 10 Mosquitos; poor weather and pathfinder failures led to one bomb on Leverkusen; many other towns were bombed and 5 aircraft lost (1.9 per cent). Six Mosquitos to Duisburg, 2 to Rheinhausen, 25 minelayer sorties off Biscay ports, 11 OTU sorties no losses. Fog over England led to 2 Halifax and 1 Stirling crashes; 4 Halifaxes of 35 Squadron made safe landings at Graveley which had its first Fog Investigation and Dispersal Operation (FIDO).
- Night of 22/23 November 1943, 764 bombers to Berlin; 469 Lancasters, 234 Halifaxes, 50 Stirlings, 11 Mosquitos; 25 aircraft lost, eleven Lancasters, ten Halifaxes and four Stirlings (3.4 per cent). Three aircraft were lost over England; five losses were attributed to FlaK over Berlin, three to ground-controlled interception (GCI) by night-fighters over the city and three by GCI near Deelen during the return; 80 aircraft were hit by FlaK and one by a fighter, five were hit by incendiaries from above, two collided and seven aircraft were lost to unknown causes. Pathfinders marked at 20:00 with red and green Target indicator bombs. An hour after the raid a wave of Mosquitos bombed. Most of the damage was to the residential areas west of the city centre, Tiergarten and Charlottenburg, Schöneberg and Spandau. Because of the dry weather, several 'firestorms' were caused. Several buildings of note were damaged or destroyed, including the British, French, Italian and Japanese embassies, Charlottenburg Castle and Berlin Zoo. Also the Ministry of Weapons and Munitions, the Waffen-SS Administrative College, the barracks of the Imperial Guard at Spandau, the Osram and Telefunken factories and the Albrecht armaments works employed in the war economy were hit. A German report listed 130 mines, 900 HE bombs, 200,000 incendiaries, 20,000 phosphorus bombs and 60 flares were dropped. Casualties were 1,757 killed, 6.923 injured and about 180,000 people bombed out; 2,791 homes destroyed, 2,300 damaged; some panic and looting ensued, four million ration books were destroyed. After several months of excluding the foreign press from bombed towns, the Press Bureau of the Foreign Office called a conference on 23 November, when the streets were blocked by debris and fires were being extinguished. The most effective raid on Berlin of the war, despite 10/10ths cloud over the city.
- Night of 23/24 November 1943: Berlin, 383 aircraft, 365 Lancasters, ten Halifaxes, six Mosquitos, 46 early returns (12 per cent); 21 bombers lost (5.49 per cent); bombing from 19:58 to 20:15, about 1,377 long tons (1,399 t) of bombs 734 long tons (746 t) high explosive, 643 long tons (653 t) incendiary. Primary blind markers each to drop red TIs and a bundle of flares of red and with green stars by H2S. Other blind markers were to mark the aiming point with salvos of reds and yellows along with four bundles of flares each. Secondary blind markers would drop green TIs and one bundle of flares apiece and early backers-up greens on the reds and yellows if visible and if not the centre of the reds after a two-second overshoot. The Main Force was to bomb on the centre of the greens also with a two-second overshoot or to bomb on H2S of if they were unserviceable, aim at the centre of the flares. The FlaK was as effective as before but the fighter controller commanded a Zahme Sau (Tame Boar) interception from 18:12, ordered them to Berlin at 19:30 and Brandenburg at 20:00, the time for the raid to begin. Fighter interceptions began at 20:08.

Operation Corona (false instructions to German aircraft) broadcast from England had some effect. Two German night-fighters might have been shot down over Berlin and 21 bombers were lost, with 27 damaged, 14 to FlaK, four to fighters and nine to other causes. Four bombers crashed between the Netherlands coast and Leeuwarden, four were shot down by fighters between Groningen and Hanover, one to Flak near Texel. Three aircraft were shot down by FlaK over Berlin, early in the raid, five by fighters during it. Six of the damaged aircraft were write-offs, one by FlaK and the rest in landing accidents. (Note: Middlebrook recorded 20 Lancasters lost (5.2 per cent) plus six Lancasters written off in crashes and accidents; 127 crew killed and 24 captured. Six Oboe Mosquito sorties, one crashed on return, crew killed.) A German report had the raid beginning at 19:26 and that 13,005 people were killed, 6,383 were injured and 300,000 people were rendered destitute; 120 mines, 850 HE bombs, 20,000 phosphorus bombs, 250,000 incendiaries and 70 flares were counted; 1,989 houses were destroyed and 2,443 were badly damaged and 20,000 slightly damaged; a military installation was destroyed, 22 severely and 22 slightly damaged; the Spandau power station was destroyed.

- Night of 24/25 November 1943: Berlin was attacked by six Mosquitos (one lost); nine Operational Training Unit (OTU) Vickers Wellingtons dropping leaflets over France.
- Night of 25/26 November 1943: Frankfurt was the main target for 236 Halifaxes and 26 Lancasters (262 aircraft). Three Mosquitos were sent to Berlin and other targets were bombed.
- Night of 26/27 November 1943: Berlin, the main target, was attacked by 443 Lancasters and seven Mosquitos. The Mosquitos were used to lay Window ahead of the Pathfinder aircraft to draw flak away from them but due to a temporarily clear sky, 21 aircraft were lost to AA guns over Berlin. Most of the damage was in the semi-industrial suburb of Reinickendorf but the city centre and Siemensstadt (with its many electrical equipment factories), was also hit. Stuttgart was raided by 157 Halifaxes and 21 Lancasters as a diversion. Both forces flew the same route almost as far as Frankfurt which Luftwaffe fighter controllers identified as the RAF target. The total sorties for the night, including minelaying operations, was 666 with 34 aircraft (5.1 per cent) lost. Losses over Berlin were high and combined with landing accidents in fog in England, reached 9.3 per cent. The Alkett factory, a big producer of armoured fighting vehicles, was badly hit and Goebbels described it as "almost completely destroyed" and referred to "virtually irreplaceable tools and machines" being out of action in his diary.
- Night of 28/29 November 1943: Essen was attacked by ten Mosquitos, Duisburg by one; ten aircraft laid mines off Brest and Cherbourg; seven OTU sorties, no losses.
- Night of 29/30 November 1943: Bochum, Cologne and Düsseldorf, attacked by 21 Mosquitos for no loss.
- Night of 30 November/1 December 1943: 100 (Bomber Support) Group debuts with four 192 Squadron Wellington Radio Counter Measures (RCM) sorties. Essen attacked by four Mosquitos, 29 Stirling and 15 Wellington minelaying sorties from Brest to Bayonne, seven OTU sorties, no losses.
- Night of 1/2 December 1943: 19 Stirlings and 12 Halifaxes minelaying off Frisian Islands and east coast of Denmark, 2 Stirlings lost.

=== December 1943 ===
- Night of 2/3 December 1943: Berlin, the main target, was attacked by 425 Lancasters, 18 Mosquitos and 15 Halifaxes. The Germans identified Berlin as the target. Unexpected cross winds scattered the bomber stream and German fighters shot down forty bombers, 37 Lancasters, two Halifaxes and a Mosquito (8.7 per cent of the force). The bombing was inaccurate and to the south of the city but two more of the Siemens factories, a ball-bearing factory and several railway installations were damaged.
- Night of 3/4 December 1943: Leipzig, the main target, was attacked by 307 Lancasters, 220 Halifaxes (527 aircraft). The main force took a direct heading to Berlin, then turned south for Leipzig, leaving 9 Mosquitos to carry on, decoying many German night fighters.
- Night of 4/5 December 1943: Duisburg attacked by nine Mosquitos, 48 aircraft minelaying off the Frisians, 9 OTU sorties, one Stirling minelayer and an OTU Whitley lost.
- Night of 5/6 December 1943: 3 Wellington RCM sorties, no loss.
- Night of 9/10 December 1943: 3 Wellington RCM sorties, no loss.
- Night of 10/11 December 1943: Leverkusen attacked by 25 Mosquitos, Krefeld by two, 4 OTU sorties no loss.
- Night of 11/12 December 1943: Duisburg attacked by 18 Mosquitos, 1 Wellington RCM sortie, no loss.
- Night of 12/13 December 1943: 18 Mosquitos to Essen, 9 to Düsseldorf, 1 to Osnabrück, 4 RCM and 4 OTU sorties, 1 Mosquito lost at Essen.
- Night of 13/14 December 1943: 16 Mosquitos to Düsseldorf, 1 to Bonn, 25 OTU sorties, no loss.
- Night of 15/16 December 1943: 4 Mosquitos to Bochum, 4 to Leverkusen and 3 RCM sorties, no loss.
- Night of 16/17 December 1943: Berlin was the main target. It was attacked by 483 Lancasters and 15 Mosquitos. German night fighters were directed to intercept the bombers; 25 Lancasters, 5.2 per cent of the Lancaster force, were lost over enemy occupied territory and 29 aircraft were lost on landing in England due to very low cloud. The raid was unusual in that losses due to bad weather over England were greater than losses due to flak or enemy night fighters. The damage to the Berlin railway system was extensive and 1,000 wagon-loads of war material destined for the Eastern Front were held up for six days. The National Theatre and the building housing Germany's military and political archives were both destroyed. The effect of the bombing campaign had made unusable more than a quarter of the living accommodation in Berlin. Two Beaufighters and two Mosquitos of No. 141 Squadron RAF using Serrate radar detectors managed to damage a Messerschmitt Bf 110, the first successful 'Serrate' patrol. On the same night there was other raids on Tilley-le-Haut and Flixecourt, two flying-bomb sites near Abbeville. The raid failed to destroy the sites but no aircraft were lost.
- Night of 19/20 December 1943: 6 OTU Wellingtons leafleted French towns, no loss.
- Night of 20/21 December 1943: Frankfurt was attacked by 390 Lancasters, 257 Halifaxes and three Mosquitos (650 aircraft). German night fighters got into the bomber stream; 27 Halifaxes and 14 Lancasters were lost, 6.3 per cent of the force. Damage was more than the RAF thought at the time because they knew that the Germans had lit decoy fires, which had some success as diversions. There was a decoy raid on Mannheim by 54 aircraft and a precision attack by eight Lancasters of 617 Squadron and 8 Pathfinder Mosquitos, on an armaments factory near Liege that failed to hit the target.
- Night of 21/22 December 1943: 9 Oboe Mosquitos attacked the Mannesmann factory at Düsseldorf, 4 the Knapsack power station, 4 OTU sorties, no loss.
- Night of 22/23 December 1943: 51 aircraft (29 Stirlings, 11 Lancasters, 8 Mosquitos and three Halifaxes) attacked two flying-bomb sites between Abbeville and Amiens. One site was destroyed but the other was not located. Nine Mosquitos to Frankfurt, two to Bonn, 2 RCM sorties, 16 minelaying sorties off Biscay ports and 21 OTU sorties, no loss.
- Night of 23/24 December 1943: Berlin was attacked by 364 Lancasters, eight Mosquitos and seven Halifaxes. German night-fighters were hampered by the weather and shot down only 16 Lancasters, 4.2 per cent of the force. Little damage was caused to Berlin; several other German towns were attacked by Mosquitos.
- Night of 24/25 December 1943: 35 Halifax minelaying sorties off Frisian islands, no loss.
- Night of 28/29 December 1943: 10 Mosquitos to Duisburg, 9 to Düsseldorf, 1 to Cologne, 11 OTU sorties, no loss.
- Night of 29/30 December 1943: Berlin was the target for 457 Lancasters, 252 Halifaxes and three Mosquitos (712 aircraft), RAF losses were light at 2.8 per cent of the force. Cloud cover frustrated the RAF and little damage was caused.
- Night of 30/31 December 1943: 10 Lancasters of 617 Squadron and six Pathfinder Mosquitos failed to destroy a V1 site. Ten Mosquitos to Cologne, 8 to Duisburg, 3 to Bochum, 6 RCM sorties; 36 Minelayers off Texel and French ports, 28 OTU sorties, no loss.
- Night of 31 December 1943/1 January 1944: 2 Stirling minelayer sorties, no loss.

=== January 1944 ===
- Night of 1/2 January 1944: 421 Lancasters dispatched to Berlin, the main target. German night fighters shot down 6.7 per cent of the force. A small raid on Hamburg by 15 Mosquitos and smaller raids on other towns failed to divert the night fighters.
- Night of 2/3 January 1944: Berlin was the main target. 362 Lancasters, 12 Mosquitos, nine Halifaxes (383 aircraft), night fighters failed to reach the bombers until they were over the city, then shoot down 27 Lancasters, 10 per cent of the force. There were also minor raids on other cities.
- Night of 3/4 January 1944: 6 Mosquitos to Solingen and 2 to Essen, no loss.
- Night of 4/5 January 1944: 80 bombers to a flying bomb site in Pas de Calais and one at Bristillerie, Cherbourg (57 Stirlings, 12 Mosquitos, 11 Lancasters) for no loss. Berlin raided by 13 Mosquitos, 3 to Krefeld, two to Cologne; 4 RCM sorties, 40 minelayer sorties off Lorient and Brest, 8 OTU sorties no loss. (Note: Special Operations Executive (SOE) sorties by 138 Squadron and 161 Squadron noted for the first time; 18 Halifax and 1 Lockheed Hudson sorties flown plus 6 Stirling sorties by 214 Squadron now that Stirlings were not bombing German targets; supplies dropped and agents landed for the Resistance.)
- Night of 5/6 January 1944: Stettin not raided in numbers since September 1941; 348 Lancasters and 10 Halifaxes. Accurate bombing on town centre, later drifting to the west; 244 people killed, 1,016 injured 504 houses and 20 industrial premises destroyed, 1,148 houses and 29 industrial buildings seriously damaged and 8 ships sunk in harbour. Diversion by 13 Mosquitos on Berlin and 25 to four other targets succeeded; 16 aircraft lost, 4.5 per cent of the force. A Mosquito flew an RCM sortie, 6 Lancasters laid mines off Swinemünde and last Bristol Beaufighter Serrate patrol flown. (Note: Subsequent Serrate patrols flown by Mosquitos.)
- Night of 6/7 January 1944: 16 Mosquitos to Duisburg, 2 to Bristillerie, 1 to Dortmund and 1 to Solingen; 57 minelayer sorties to Biscay ports and 10 OTU sorties, no loss.
- Night of 7/8 January 1944: 6 Moaquitos to Krefeld, 5 to Duisburg, 28 OTU sorties. A 138 Squadron Halifax crashed after take-off, crew and the 3 passengers killed.
- Night of 8/9 January 1944: 10 Moaqiutos to Frankfurt, 8 to Solingen, 3 to Aachen and 2 to Dortmund; two losses.
- Night of 10/11 January 1944: 10 Mosquitos to Berlin, 7 to Solingen, 2 to Koblenz, 1 to Krefeld, no loss.
- Night of 13/14 January 1944: 12 Mosquitos to Essen, 9 to Duisburg, 2 to Aachen and 2 to Koblenz, one aircraft lost.
- Night of 14/15 January 1944: Raid on Brunswick, the first of the war, by 496 Lancasters and two Halifaxes. 38 Lancasters were lost to night fighters. 11 of the lost aircraft were Pathfinders and the marking of the city was poor. German authorities reported only 10 houses destroyed and 14 people killed, with some damage and loss of life in villages to the south. 82 aircraft attacked flying bomb sites at Ailly, Bonneton and Bristillerie without loss; 17 Mosquitos raided Magdeburg and Berlin.
- Night of 20/21 January 1944: Berlin was the target; 495 Lancasters, 264 Halifaxes, 10 Mosquitos (769 aircraft) were dispatched; 22 Halifaxes and 13 Lancasters were lost, 4.6 per cent of the force. The damage could not be assessed due to low cloud the next day.
- Night of 21/22 January 1944: Magdeburg was the main target for 421 Lancasters, 224 Halifaxes, 3 Mosquitos (648 aircraft); 57 were lost. The attack failed to identify the target, and little damage was done.
- Night of 27/28 January 1944: Berlin was the target for 515 Lancasters and 15 Mosquitos (530 aircraft). RAF records state that the bombing appeared to have been spread well up- and down-wind. The diversions were partially successful in diverting German night fighters but 33 Lancasters were lost, 6.4 per cent of the heavy bombers; 167 sorties were flown against other targets, one aircraft was lost.
- Night of 28/29 January 1944: Berlin was attacked by 432 Lancasters, 241 Halifaxes and four Mosquitos (677 aircraft). Western and southern districts, partly covered cloud, were hit in what RAF records call the most concentrated attack of this period. German records mention that 77 places outside the city were hit. A deception raid and routing over Northern Denmark did not prevent the German air defences shooting down 46 aircraft, 6.8 per cent of the force. Just over 100 aircraft attacked other targets.
- Night of 29/30 January 1944: 12 Mosquitos to Duisburg, 10 to Herbouville flying-bomb site, 6 OTU sorties, no loss.
- Night of 30/31 January 1944: Berlin was attacked by 440 Lancasters, 82 Halifaxes and 12 Mosquitos (534 aircraft) 33 bombers lost (6.2 per cent). A further 76 sorties were flown against other targets; no loss.

=== February 1944 ===
- Night of 15/16 February 1944: 891 aircraft to Berlin; 561 Lancasters, 314 Halifaxes and 16 Mosquitos, the largest Berlin raid of the war. Despite cloud cover, most important war industries were hit, including Siemensstadt, the centre and south-western districts worst hit. A spoof by 24 Lancasters of 8 Group on Frankfurt-on-the-Oder failed and the RAF lost 43 aircraft, 26 Lancasters and 17 Halifaxes, 4.8 per cent. A further 155 sorties were flown against other targets.
- Night of 19/20 February 1944, 823 aircraft to Leipzig; 561 Lancasters, 255 Halifaxes and 7 Mosquitos; 78 aircraft lost, 44 Lancasters and 34 Halifaxes (9.5 per cent, 13.3 per cent of the Halifax sorties, 14.9 per cent of those reaching as far as the enemy coast). Halifax Mk II and Mk V aircraft withdrawn from Main Force raids on Germany. At Kiel Bay 45 Stirlings and 4 Halifax pathfinders laid mines, 16 Oboe Mosquitos bombed night-fighter bases in the Netherlands, 15 Mosquitos flew a diversion to Berlin, 12 Mosquito Serrate sorties, one Mosquito lost from the Berlin diversion force. Three Mosquitos to Aachen, three to flying-bomb sites in France for no loss. The RAF flew 921 sorties, 79 aircraft lost (8.6 per cent) the largest loss yet (58 aircraft lost on Magdeburg raid 21/22 January 1943).
- Night of 20/21 February 1944, 598 aircraft to Stuttgart; 460 Lancasters, 126 Halifaxes and 12 Mosquitos. Early diversions successful, 9 aircraft lost, 7 Lancasters, 2 Halifaxes, (1.5 per cent). Four Lancasters and a Halifax crashed in England. Training exercise earlier across North Sea, 156 OTU aircraft, 24 from squadrons before raid got the night-fighters up two hours early; 24 Mosquitos attacked airfields in Netherlands, 7 Mosquitos to Munich, 7 Mosquito Serrate sorties no losses. Mining off French ports by 28 Stirlings and 6 Wellingtons, one Wellington lost. RAF flew 836 sorties, ten aircraft lost (1.2 per cent).
- Night of 21/22 February 1944, 17 Mosquitos to Duisburg, Stuttgart and 2 flying-bomb sites, 1 Serrate patrol, 41 aircraft laid mines off Frisian Islands and French ports; 10 OTU sorties, 1 Stirling minelayer lost.
- Night of 22/23 February 1944, 10 Mosquitos to Stuttgart, 8 to Duisburg, 3 to Aachen; 71 Halifax and 40 Stirling minelayer sorties to north German coast called back due to weather over their bases; 2 RCM and 2 Serrate sorties; no loss.
- Night of 23/24 February 1944, 17 Mosquitos to Düsseldorf where first 4,000 lb (1,800 kg) bomb carried by Mosquito dropped; 2 Serrate sorties, 3 OTU flights, no loss.

=== March 1944 ===
- Night of 24/25 March 1944: Berlin was the main target. The bomber stream was scattered and those that reached the city bombed well out to the south-west of the Großstadt. The RAF lost 72 aircraft, 8.9 per cent of the force.
- Night of 26/27 March 1944: Essen attacked by 476 Lancasters, 207 Halifaxes, 22 Mosquitos (705 aircraft).
- Night of 30/31 March 1944: Nuremberg attacked by 572 Lancasters, 214 Halifaxes and nine Mosquitos (795 aircraft). Unusually clear weather, contrails formed lower than usual. Bomber stream flew straight track, no evasive routing, led the Germans quickly to decide that Nuremberg was the target. The night fighters reached the bomber stream at the Belgian border; more than 82 bombers were lost before Nuremberg and 13 bombers were shot down on the return, 11.9 per cent loss. It was the costliest RAF Bomber Command mission of the war and ended the Battle of Berlin. Pilot Officer Cyril Barton, a Halifax pilot of 578 Squadron, was awarded a posthumous Victoria Cross.
- 18/19 November 1943 to 31 March 1944; 100 night operations, five by day; 24,449 night sorties, 1,117 losses (3.8 per cent). Circa 78,447 long tons (79,706 t) bombs dropped. Averages per 24 hours, 219.8 sorties, 8.3 aircraft lost and 585.6 long tons (595.0 t) tons of bombs dropped.

== See also ==
- Flakturm
- The Berlin Raids
- Bombing of Berlin in World War II
- Bombing of Tokyo
