= No. 578 Squadron RAF =

Defunct flying squadron of the Royal Air Force

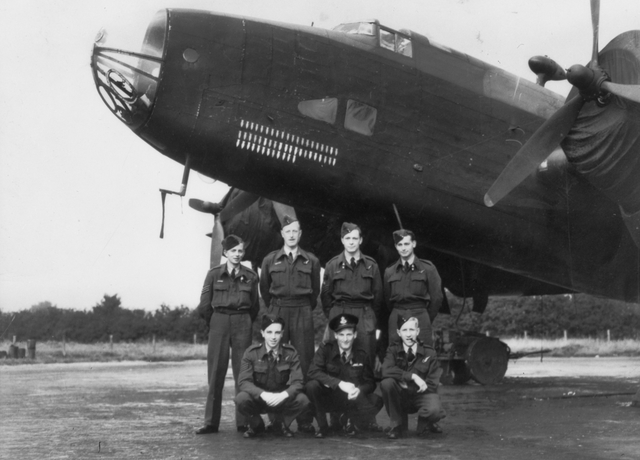
- 578 Squadron aircrew in front of their Handley Page Halifax
- Active: 14 January 1944 – 15 April 1945
- Country: United Kingdom
- Branch: Royal Air Force
- Role: Bomber squadron
- Part of: No. 4 Group RAF, Bomber Command
- Motto(s): Accuracy
- Battle honours: France and Germany, 1944–1945; Honours marked with an asterisk* are emblazoned on the Squadron Standard

Insignia
- Squadron Badge heraldry: An arrow in pale, the point downwards, cleft by another
- Squadron Codes: LK (Jan 1944 – Apr 1945)

Aircraft flown
- Bomber: Handley Page Halifax; Four-engined heavy bomber

No. 578 Squadron RAF was a heavy bomber squadron of the Royal Air Force during the Second World War.

== History ==
578 Squadron was formed at RAF Snaith, East Riding of Yorkshire on 14 January 1944 from 'C' flight of No. 51 Squadron RAF, equipped with Halifax Mk.III bombers, as part of No. 4 Group RAF in Bomber Command. It transferred to RAF Burn, North Yorkshire in February, and was disbanded there on 15 April 1945. The squadron carried out 2,721 operational sorties with the Halifax for a loss 40 aircraft.

=== Notable squadron members ===
The first commanding officer was W/Cdr. D.S.S. Wilkerson, DSO, DFC and the aircrew included Pilot Officer Cyril Joe Barton, VC.

== Aircraft operated ==
Aircraft operated by no. 578 Squadron RAF, data from
From	To	Aircraft	Version
January 1944	March 1945	Handley-Page Halifax	Mk.III

=== Notable aircraft ===
Two of the Halifaxes of 578 squadron passed the century mark and flew more than 100 operational sorties:

No. 578 Squadron RAF aircraft with the most number of operations, data from
Serial no.	Name	Operations	Call-sign	Fate	Remarks
MZ527		105	LK-W, LK-D	Struck off charge, April 1945	
LW587		104	LK-V, LK-A	Scrapped, September 1946	Did their 100th operation together, 3 March 1945

== Squadron bases ==
bases and airfields used by no. 578 Squadron RAF, data from
From	To	Base
14 January 1944	6 February 1944	RAF Snaith, East Riding of Yorkshire
6 February 1944	15 April 1945	RAF Burn, North Yorkshire
