= List of World War II aces credited with 100 or more victories =

This list of World War II aces credited with 100 or more victories is a subset list of all fighter aces in World War II. A flying ace or fighter ace is a military aviator credited with shooting down five or more enemy aircraft during aerial combat. Here, all the fighter pilots with more than 100 aerial victories claimed are listed, all from the German Luftwaffe. According to Edward H. Sims, none of the other air forces of World War II had pilots who claimed more than 100 aerial victories.

== Aces ==
Fate of pilots with more than 100 claims
1. Survived (50.9%)
2. Killed in action (26.9%)
3. Killed in flying accident (11.1%)
4. Missing in action (8.30%)
5. Other reasons (2.80%)

According to Ernst Obermaier, 103 Luftwaffe pilots were credited with more than 100 aerial victories. Further more, the US historian David T. Zabecki states that 105 Luftwaffe pilots were credited with more than 100 aerial victories, adding Friedrich Wachowiak with 140 aerial victories, and Paul-Heinrich Dähne with 100 aerial victories, who were not listed by Obermaier. Additionally, Mike Spick lists Horst-Günther von Fassong with 136 aerial victories, Rudolf Rademacher with 126 aerial victories, and Herbert Rollwage with 102 aerial victories.

This background, along with the symbol "†", indicates that the pilot was killed in action, missing in action, died of wounds, or was killed in a flying accident during World War II.
This background, along with the ? (question mark), indicates doubt regarding the veracity and formal correctness of the listing.

Name	Country	Service(s)	Aerial victories	Other aerial victories	Notes	Image
Erich Hartmann	Germany	Luftwaffe	352		Top ace of all time. First ever with 300 victories, achieved coincident with Double-ace in a day	
Gerhard Barkhorn	Germany	Luftwaffe	301			
Günther Rall	Germany	Luftwaffe	275			
Otto Kittel †	Germany	Luftwaffe	267		Top Focke-Wulf Fw 190 ace Killed in action on 16 February 1945.	
Walter Nowotny †	Germany	Luftwaffe	258		Double-ace in a day on two different occasions. First to 250; Killed in action on 8 November 1944.	
Wilhelm Batz	Germany	Luftwaffe	237			
Erich Rudorffer	Germany	Luftwaffe	224 (Note: According to Spick, Rudorffer was credited with 222 aerial victories.)		Jet ace with 12 victories in Me 262, Double-ace in a day Credited with 11 heavy bombers shot down	
Heinz Bär	Germany	Luftwaffe	221 (Note: According to Spick, Bär was credited with 220 aerial victories.)		Jet ace with 16 victories in Me 262; Credited with 21 heavy bombers shot down	
Hermann Graf	Germany	Luftwaffe	212		First ever with 200 victories	
Heinrich Ehrler †	Germany	Luftwaffe	208		Jet ace with 5 victories in Me 262; Credited with 7 heavy bombers shot down Killed in action on 4 April 1945.	
Theodor Weissenberger	Germany	Luftwaffe	208		Jet ace with 8 victories in Me 262; Credited with 7 heavy bombers shot down	
Hans Philipp †	Germany	Luftwaffe	206		Killed in action on 8 October 1943.	
Walter Schuck	Germany	Luftwaffe	206		Jet ace with 8 victories in Me 262	
Anton Hafner †	Germany	Luftwaffe	204		Killed in action on 17 October 1944.	
Helmut Lipfert	Germany	Luftwaffe	203			
Walter Krupinski	Germany	Luftwaffe	197			
Anton Hackl	Germany	Luftwaffe	192		Credited with 34 heavy bombers shot down	
Joachim Brendel	Germany	Luftwaffe	189			
Max Stotz †	Germany	Luftwaffe	189		Missing in action on 19 August 1943.	
Joachim Kirschner †	Germany	Luftwaffe	188		Killed after taken prisoner of war on 17 December 1943.	
Kurt Brändle †	Germany	Luftwaffe	180		Killed in action on 3 November 1943.	
Günther Josten	Germany	Luftwaffe	178			
Johannes Steinhoff	Germany	Luftwaffe	176		Jet ace with 6 victories in Me 262	
Ernst-Wilhelm Reinert	Germany	Luftwaffe	174			
Günther Schack	Germany	Luftwaffe	174			
Heinz Schmidt †	Germany	Luftwaffe	173		Missing in action on 5 September 1943.	
Emil Lang †	Germany	Luftwaffe	173		Triple-ace in a day Killed in action on 3 September 1944.	
Horst Ademeit †	Germany	Luftwaffe	166		Missing in action on 7 August 1944.	
Wolf-Dietrich Wilcke †	Germany	Luftwaffe	162		Killed in action on 23 March 1944.	
Hans-Joachim Marseille †	Germany	Luftwaffe	158		Top scoring ace outside the Eastern Front. Destroyed most Western Allied aircraft. Triple-ace in a day Killed in flying accident on 30 September 1942.	
Heinrich Sturm †	Germany	Luftwaffe	158 (Note: According to Spick, Sturm was credited with 157 aerial victories.)		Killed in flying accident on 22 December 1944.	
Gerhard Thyben	Germany	Luftwaffe	157			
Hans Beisswenger †	Germany	Luftwaffe	152		Missing in action on 6 March 1943.	
Peter Düttmann	Germany	Luftwaffe	152 (Note: According to Spick, Düttmann was credited with 150 aerial victories.)			
Gordon Gollob	Germany	Luftwaffe	150		First ever with 150 victories	
Fritz Tegtmeier	Germany	Luftwaffe	146			
Albin Wolf †	Germany	Luftwaffe	144		Killed in action on 2 April 1944.	
Kurt Tanzer	Germany	Luftwaffe	143			
Friedrich-Karl Müller †	Germany	Luftwaffe	140		Credited with 23 heavy bombers shot down Killed in flying accident on 29 May 1944.	
Friedrich Wachowiak †	Germany	Luftwaffe	140		Schreier lists him with 130 aerial victories. Obermaier states that the exact number of aerial victories is not known, and lists him with at least 86 aerial victories. Spick also states that he was credited with at least 86 aerial victories. Killed in action on 16 July 1944.	
Karl Gratz	Germany	Luftwaffe	138			
Heinrich Setz †	Germany	Luftwaffe	138		Killed in action on 13 March 1943.	
Rudolf Trenkel	Germany	Luftwaffe	138			
Franz Schall †	Germany	Luftwaffe	137 (Note: According to Zabecki, Schall was credited with 133 aerial victories.)		Jet ace with 14 victories in Me 262; Killed in flying accident on 10 April 1945.	
Walter Wolfrum	Germany	Luftwaffe	137		Double-ace in a day on two different occasions	
Adolf Dickfeld	Germany	Luftwaffe	136			
Horst-Günther von Fassong †	Germany	Luftwaffe	136		Obermaier lists him with 75, potentially about 80, aerial victories. Missing in action on 1 January 1945.	
Otto Fönnekold †	Germany	Luftwaffe	136		Killed in action on 31 August 1944.	
Karl-Heinz Weber †	Germany	Luftwaffe	136		Missing in action on 7 June 1944.	
Joachim Müncheberg †	Germany	Luftwaffe	135		Killed in action on 23 March 1943.	
Hans Waldmann †	Germany	Luftwaffe	134		Ace in a day Killed in flying accident on 18 March 1944.	
Alfred Grislawski	Germany	Luftwaffe	133 (Note: According to Zabecki, Grislawski was credited with 132 aerial victories.)			
Johannes Wiese	Germany	Luftwaffe	133			
Adolf Borchers	Germany	Luftwaffe	132			
Erwin Clausen †	Germany	Luftwaffe	132		Credited with 10 heavy bombers shot down Missing in action on 4 October 1943.	
Wilhelm Lemke †	Germany	Luftwaffe	131		Killed in action on 4 December 1943.	
Gerhard Hoffmann †	Germany	Luftwaffe	130 (Note: According to Spick, Hoffmann was credited with 125 aerial victories.)		Killed in flying accident on 11 April 1945.	
Heinrich Sterr †	Germany	Luftwaffe	130 (Note: According to Zabecki, Sterr was credited with 129 aerial victories.)		Killed in action on 26 November 1944.	
Walther Dahl	Germany	Luftwaffe	129 (Note: According to Spick, Dahl was credited with 128 aerial victories.)		Credited with 30 heavy bombers shot down	
Franz Eisenach	Germany	Luftwaffe	129			
Franz Dörr	Germany	Luftwaffe	128			
Rudolf Rademacher	Germany	Luftwaffe	126		Jet ace with 8 victories in Me 262; Credited with 11 heavy bombers shot down According to Obermaier, he is credited with 97 aerial victories.	
Josef Zwernemann †	Germany	Luftwaffe	126		Credited with 5 heavy bombers shot down Killed in action on 8 April 1944.	
Dietrich Hrabak	Germany	Luftwaffe	125			
Wolf-Udo Ettel †	Germany	Luftwaffe	124		Killed in action on 17 July 1943.	
Herbert Ihlefeld	Germany	Luftwaffe	123	+9 in Spanish Civil War	Ace in each of two wars	
Wolfgang Tonne †	Germany	Luftwaffe	122		Killed in flying accident on 20 April 1943.	
Heinz Marquardt	Germany	Luftwaffe	121			
Heinz-Wolfgang Schnaufer	Germany	Luftwaffe	121		Top night fighter ace. Ace in a day	
Robert Weiß †	Germany	Luftwaffe	121		Killed in action on 29 December 1944.	
Friedrich Obleser	Germany	Luftwaffe	120			
Erich Leie †	Germany	Luftwaffe	118		Killed in action on 7 March 1945.	
Franz-Josef Beerenbrock	Germany	Luftwaffe	117			
Hans-Joachim Birkner †	Germany	Luftwaffe	117		Killed in flying accident on 14 December 1944.	
Jakob Norz †	Germany	Luftwaffe	117		Killed in flying accident on 16 September 1944.	
Walter Oesau †	Germany	Luftwaffe	117	+9 in Spanish Civil War	Credited with 13 heavy bombers shot down Killed in action on 11 May 1944.	
Heinz Wernicke †	Germany	Luftwaffe	117		Killed in action on 27 December 1944.	
August Lambert †	Germany	Luftwaffe	116		Triple-ace in a day Killed in action on 17 April 1945.	
Wilhelm Crinius	Germany	Luftwaffe	114			
Werner Schröer	Germany	Luftwaffe	114		Credited with 26 heavy bombers shot down	
Hans Dammers †	Germany	Luftwaffe	113		Died of wounds on 17 March 1944.	
Berthold Korts †	Germany	Luftwaffe	113		Missing in action on 29 August 1943.	
Kurt Bühligen	Germany	Luftwaffe	112		Credited with 24 heavy bombers shot down	
Kurt Ubben †	Germany	Luftwaffe	111		Killed in action on 27 April 1944.	
Helmut Lent †	Germany	Luftwaffe	110		Night fighter ace Killed in flying accident on 7 October 1944.	
Franz Woidich	Germany	Luftwaffe	110			
Emil Bitsch †	Germany	Luftwaffe	108		Killed in action on 15 March 1944.	
Hans Hahn	Germany	Luftwaffe	108			
Bernhard Vechtel	Germany	Luftwaffe	108			
Viktor Bauer	Germany	Luftwaffe	106			
Werner Lucas †	Germany	Luftwaffe	106		Killed in action on 24 October 1943.	
Günther Lützow †	Germany	Luftwaffe	105	+5 in Spanish Civil War	Missing in action on 24 April 1945.	
Eberhard von Boremski	Germany	Luftwaffe	104			
Adolf Galland	Germany	Luftwaffe	104		Jet ace with 7 victories in Me 262	
Heinz Sachsenberg	Germany	Luftwaffe	104			
Hartmann Grasser	Germany	Luftwaffe	103			
Siegfried Freytag	Germany	Luftwaffe	102			
Friedrich Geisshardt †	Germany	Luftwaffe	102		Died of wounds on 6 April 1943.	
Egon Mayer †	Germany	Luftwaffe	102		Credited with 26 heavy bombers shot down Killed in action on 2 March 1944.	
Herbert Rollwage	Germany	Luftwaffe	102		Toliver and Constable also list him with 102 aerial victories. Obermaier states that the exact number of aerial victories remains unknown, likely to be in the range of 80 to 85.	
Max-Hellmuth Ostermann †	Germany	Luftwaffe	102		Killed in action on 9 August 1942.	
Josef Wurmheller †	Germany	Luftwaffe	102		Killed in action on 22 June 1944.	
Werner Mölders †	Germany	Luftwaffe	101	+14 in Spanish Civil War	Ace in each of two wars, first in aviation history with 100 victories Killed as a passenger in a flying accident on 22 November 1941.	
Rudolf Miethig †	Germany	Luftwaffe	101		Killed in action on 10 June 1943.	
Josef Priller	Germany	Luftwaffe	101			
Ulrich Wernitz	Germany	Luftwaffe	101			
Paul-Heinrich Dähne †	Germany	Luftwaffe	100		Killed in flying accident on 24 April 1945.	
Reinhard Seiler	Germany	Luftwaffe	100	+9 in Spanish Civil War	Includes 15 aerial victories as a night fighter	
