= List of aerial victories claimed by Heinrich Ehrler =

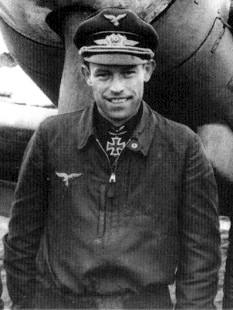
Ehrler before a Messerschmitt Bf 109

Heinrich Ehrler (14 September 1917 – 4 April 1945) was a German Luftwaffe military aviator and wing commander during World War II. As a fighter ace, he is credited with 208 enemy aircraft shot down in over 400 combat missions. The majority of his victories were claimed over the Eastern Front, with nine claims over the Western Front which included eight in the Messerschmitt Me 262 jet fighter.

== List of aerial victories claimed ==
According to US historian David T. Zabecki, Ehrler was credited with 208 aerial victories. While Spick lists Ehrler with 209 aerial victories claimed in an unknown number of combat missions. Of these, ten were claimed over the Western Allies and the remaining 199 on the Eastern Front. Obermaier lists him with 208 aerial victories claimed in over 400 combat missions. Mathews and Foreman, authors of Luftwaffe Aces – Biographies and Victory Claims, researched the German Federal Archives and state that Ehrler was credited with more than 182 aerial victories. This figure includes at least 173 claims made on the Eastern Front and 9 on the Western Front, including seven four-engined bombers and eight victories with the Me 262 jet fighter. However, the authors indicate that the records for JG 5 are incomplete. They speculate that the actual number of confirmed victories could also be as low as 150 to 175.

Victory claims were logged to a map-reference (PQ = Planquadrat), for example "PQ 36 Ost AG". The Luftwaffe grid map (Jägermeldenetz) covered all of Europe, western Russia and North Africa and was composed of rectangles measuring 15 minutes of latitude by 30 minutes of longitude, an area of about 360 square miles (930 km^{2}). These sectors were then subdivided into 36 smaller units to give a location area 3 km × 4 km (1.9 mi × 2.5 mi) in size.

♠ (Ace of spades) indicates those aerial victories which made Ehrler an "ace-in-a-day", a term which designates a fighter pilot who has shot down five or more aeroplanes in a single day.
? (question mark) indicates information discrepancies listed by Prien, Stemmer, Balke, Bock, Mombeek, Mathews and Foreman.

Claim	Date	Time	Type	Location	Claim	Date	Time	Type	Location
– 2. Staffel of Jagdgeschwader 77 – (Note: According to Prien, Stemmer, Rodeike and Bock, Ehrler at the time was assigned to 2. Staffel of Jagdgeschwader 77 although the claim was filed by 4. Staffel of Jagdgeschwader 77.)
1	2 September 1941	15:00~	Beaufort	southwest of Stavanger					
According to Mathews and Foreman, the 2nd aerial victory was not documented.
– 13. Staffel of Jagdgeschwader 77 or Jagdgruppe z.b.V. Petsamo –
3	8 November 1941	—	SB-2	northwest of Loukhi	? (Note: According to Mombeek listed as 1st aerial victory claimed with 1. Staffel of Jagdgeschwader 77.)	30 November 1941	—	unknown	
– 4. Staffel of Jagdgeschwader 5 –
4	24 January 1942	13:20? (Note: According to Mathews and Foreman at 13:29.)	Hurricane	west of Pummanki	9	28 April 1942	11:00	Hurricane	vicinity of Pummanki
5	24 January 1942	15:45	MiG-3	S Tr 14	10	30 April 1942	15:20	Hurricane	vicinity of Shonguy
6	19 February 1942	10:58	I-18? (Note: According to Mathews and Foreman claimed as a Hawker Hurricane.)	vicinity of Loukhi	11? (Note: According to Mombeek listed without an aerial victory number.)	12 May 1942	14:30	Hurricane	south of Murmansk
7	4 March 1942	12:05	Hurricane		12	17 May 1942	09:00	MiG-3?	4–5 km (2.5–3.1 mi) north of Petrijärvi south of Pummanki
8	24 March 1942	18:20	Hurricane						
– 6. Staffel of Jagdgeschwader 5 –
13	28 May 1942	15:00+	P-40	10 km (6.2 mi) west of Murmashi	24	25 June 1942	09:00+? (Note: According to Mombeek claimed at approximately 10:00.)	Hurricane	8 km (5.0 mi) north of Murmansk
14	29 May 1942	23:00+	Hurricane	Kola Bay	25	29 June 1942	—	P-40	7 km (4.3 mi) east of Shonguy
15	29 May 1942	23:00+	Hurricane	Kola Bay	26?	30 June 1942	09:00~	Hurricane	3 km (1.9 mi) east of Shonguy
16	29 May 1942? (Note: According to Mombeek claimed on 30 May 1942.)	09:00+	Hurricane	eastern exit of Kola Bay	27	1 July 1942	17:10~	Hurricane	northern edge of Murmansk
17	1 June 1942	15:30~	Hurricane	5 km (3.1 mi) west of Murmansk	28	7 July 1942	17:00+	Hurricane	15 km (9.3 mi) west of Murmansk
18	2 June 1942	—	P-40	5 km (3.1 mi) west of Murmansk	29	7 July 1942	17:00+	P-40	15 km (9.3 mi) west of Murmansk
19?	13 June 1942	—	Hurricane	20 km (12 mi) west of Murmansk	30	8 July 1942	10:00~	Hurricane	5 km (3.1 mi) south of Murmansk
20	18 June 1942	04:15	Hurricane	30 km (19 mi) northwest of Murmansk	31	18 July 1942	17:00+	Hurricane	10 km (6.2 mi) northwest of Murmansk
21	22 June 1942	—	Hurricane	25 km (16 mi) northwest of Murmansk	32	18 July 1942	17:00+	Hurricane	20–25 km (12–16 mi) north of Murmansk
22	23 June 1942	15:00+	Hurricane	3 km (1.9 mi) south of Murmansk	33	19 July 1942	—	Spitfire	10 km (6.2 mi) south of Murmansk
23	25 June 1942	09:00+?	Hurricane	10 km (6.2 mi) north of Murmansk	34	19 July 1942	10:00+	P-39	6 km (3.7 mi) west of Shonguy
According to Mathews and Foreman, aerial victories 35 to 41 were not documented.
42?	21 August 1942	—	Yak-1		44?	21 August 1942	—	I-180 (Yak-7)	10 km (6.2 mi) south of Murmansk
43?	21 August 1942	—	I-180 (Yak-7)	10 km (6.2 mi) south of Murmansk					
According to Mathews and Foreman, aerial victories 45 to 52 were not documented.
53	8 September 1942	—	Hurricane	10 km (6.2 mi) south of Murmansk	55 (Note: According to Mombeek, this was the 55th aerial victory claimed. Mathews and Foreman list this claim with an unknown claim number.)	9 September 1942	11:00?	Hurricane	vicinity of Kola
54 (Note: According to Mombeek, this was the 54th aerial victory claimed. Mathews and Foreman list this claim with an unknown claim number.)	9 September 1942	11:00?	Hurricane	vicinity of Kola					
According to Mathews and Foreman, aerial victories 56 to 58 were not documented. According to Mombeek, Ehrler claimed three aerial victories of unknown type on 31 August 1942 labelled as victories 56 to 58.
59	19 September 1942	14:00+	Hurricane		60	19 September 1942	14:00+	Hurricane	
According to Mathews and Foreman, aerial victories 61 to 64 were not documented.
65	9 January 1943? (Note: According to Mathews and Foreman claimed on 19 January 1943.)	10:00	LaGG-3	Kandalaksha	67	9 January 1943?	10:00	Hurricane	Kandalaksha
66	9 January 1943?	10:00	LaGG-3	Kandalaksha					
According to Mathews and Foreman, the 68th aerial victory was not documented.
69	25 January 1943	—	Hurricane						
According to Mathews and Foreman, aerial victories 70 to 72 were not documented.
73♠	27 March 1943	14:00~	P-40	vicinity of Tuloma	95	3 June 1943	—	P-39	
74♠	27 March 1943	14:00~	P-40	vicinity of Tuloma	96	6 June 1943	—	Hurricane	
75♠	27 March 1943	14:00~	P-40	vicinity of Tuloma	97	6 June 1943	—	Hurricane	
76♠	27 March 1943	14:00~	P-40	vicinity of Tuloma	98	6 June 1943	—	Hurricane	
77♠	27 March 1943	14:00~	P-40	vicinity of Tuloma	99	6 June 1943	—	Hurricane	
78♠	13 April 1943	—	Hurricane		100	8 June 1943	17:29	Typhoon	vicinity of Kola railroad
79♠	13 April 1943	—	Hurricane		101	8 June 1943	17:30	Typhoon	vicinity of Kola railroad
80♠	13 April 1943	—	Hurricane		102	8 June 1943	—	Typhoon	
81♠	13 April 1943	—	P-40	vicinity of Murmashi	103	8 June 1943	—	Typhoon	
82♠	13 April 1943	17:00+	P-39? (Note: According to Mombeek claimed as a Curtiss P-40 Warhawk.)	15 km (9.3 mi) northwest of Murmashi; 15 km (9.3 mi) northwest of Murmansk	104	15 June 1943	—	P-39	
83♠	13 April 1943	17:00+	P-39	12 km (7.5 mi) north of Murmashi; 12 km (7.5 mi) north of Murmansk	105	15 June 1943	—	P-39	
84	19 April 1943	11:25~	P-39	15 km (9.3 mi) northeast of Murmashi; 10 km (6.2 mi) north of Murmansk	106	15 June 1943	—	P-39	
85	19 April 1943	11:25~	P-39	10 km (6.2 mi) northeast of Murmashi; 10 km (6.2 mi) north of Murmansk	107	21 June 1943	19:41	P-39	3 km (1.9 mi) west of Rutschi
86	19 April 1943	11:25~	P-40	5 km (3.1 mi) northeast of Murmashi; 5 km (3.1 mi) north of Murmansk	108	17 July 1943	—	Pe-2	Vardø/Poluostrov Rybachiy
87?	22 April 1943	13:00+	P-51	6 km (3.7 mi) east of Kola	109	17 July 1943	—	Pe-2	Vardø/Poluostrov Rybachiy
88?	22 April 1943	13:00+	P-40	12 km (7.5 mi) southeast of Kola	110	17 July 1943	—	Pe-2	Vardø/Poluostrov Rybachiy
89	29 April 1943	—	P-39	6 km (3.7 mi) east of Kola	111	20 July 1943	—	Hurricane	
90	29 April 1943	—	P-39		112	20 July 1943	—	Hurricane	
91	29 April 1943	—	P-39		113	18 August 1943	14:35	P-40	northeast of Loukhi airfield
92	30 April 1943	—	P-40		114	18 August 1943	14:36	P-40	north of Loukhi
93	30 April 1943	—	P-39		115	18 August 1943	16:13	La-5	northeast of Loukhi airfield
94	11 May 1943	—	P-39	4 km (2.5 mi) east of Murmashi					
– Stab III. Gruppe of Jagdgeschwader 5 –
116	24 September 1943	08:50	P-40	PQ 36 Ost AG	140♠	11 May 1944	03:20	Yak-9	PQ 37 Ost RE-5/6
117	25 November 1943	11:55	P-40	PQ 37 Ost UE-6/7, 6 km (3.7 mi) southwest of Petsamo airfield 6 km (3.7 mi) southwest of Pechenga	141♠	11 May 1944	07:34	P-39	PQ 37 Ost RC-2/3
118	25 November 1943	11:58	P-40	PQ 37 Ost TC-8/3, 8 km (5.0 mi) southeast of Petsamo airfield 8 km (5.0 mi) southeast of Pechenga	142♠	11 May 1944	07:36	P-39	PQ 37 Ost RD-2/4
119	25 November 1943	12:03	Il-2	PQ 37 Ost TD-7/2, 48 km (30 mi) east of Petsamo airfield 18 km (11 mi) east of Pechenga	143	16 May 1944	21:46	P-39	PQ 37 Ost QB-9/7
120	25 November 1943	12:05	Il-2	PQ 37 Ost TD-8/9, 27 km (17 mi) east of Petsamo airfield 27 km (17 mi) east of Pechenga	144	16 May 1944	21:47	P-39	PQ 37 Ost QB-6/9
121	29 January 1944	12:17	Yak-7	PQ 36 Ost AG-7/7	145	16 May 1944	21:48	P-39	PQ 37 Ost QC-7/7
122	13 March 1944	13:35	P-40	Poluostrov Rybachiy	146	16 May 1944	21:52	Il-2	PQ 37 Ost RA-3/3
123	13 March 1944	13:37	P-39	south of Vayda-Guba	147	25 May 1944	21:43	P-39	northeast of Berlevåg
124	13 March 1944	13:40	Il-2	southwest of Tobowka	148	25 May 1944	21:45	P-39	northeast of Berlevåg
125♠	17 March 1944	10:49? (Note: According to Mombeek, Mathews and Foreman claimed at 13:49.)	Yak-9	PQ 37 Ost PD-5/7 north of Pummanki	149	25 May 1944	21:47	Boston	north-northeast of Berlevåg
126♠	17 March 1944	10:52	P-39	PQ 37 Ost OC-6/9	150	25 May 1944	21:48	P-40	north-northeast of Berlevåg
127♠	17 March 1944	10:52	P-39	PQ 37 Ost OD-5/7 north of Rybachy Peninsula	151♠	26 May 1944	04:48	Boston	northwest of Vadsø
128♠	17 March 1944	10:53	Boston	PQ 37 Ost OC-8/1 north of Pummanki	152♠	26 May 1944	04:49	Boston	northwest of Vadsø
129♠	17 March 1944	15:34	Yak-9	north of Rybachy Peninsula	153♠	26 May 1944	05:02	P-40	northeast of Vadsø northeast of Hamningberg
130♠	17 March 1944	15:35	Yak-9	northwest of Pummanki	154♠	26 May 1944	05:05	P-39	north of Vadsø
131♠	17 March 1944	15:36	Yak-9	north of Pummanki	155♠	26 May 1944	05:06	P-39	north of Vadsø
132	12 April 1944	14:17	Yak-9	PQ 37 Ost TE-6/2	156♠	17 July 1944	18:37	P-39	west of Pechenga
133	12 April 1944	14:19	Yak-9	PQ 37 Ost TF-5/3	157♠	17 July 1944	18:40	P-39	west of Pechenga
134	23 April 1944	10:46	P-39	PQ 37 Ost RD-1/6	158♠	17 July 1944	18:42	P-39	southeast of Pechenga
135	23 April 1944	10:49	P-40	PQ 37 Ost RD-3/8	159♠	17 July 1944	19:16	Yak-9	northeast of Kirkenes
136	23 April 1944	10:50	P-40	PQ 37 Ost RE-4/1	160♠	17 July 1944	19:18	Yak-9	Liinakhamari
137	23 April 1944	10:50	P-40	PQ 37 Ost RE-4/5	161	21 July 1944	06:01	P-40	northwest of Hamningberg
138♠	11 May 1944	03:17	Il-2	PQ 37 Ost QE-7/5	162	21 July 1944	06:05	P-40	northeast of Hamningberg
139♠	11 May 1944	03:19	Yak-9	PQ 37 Ost RE-1/1					
– 11. Staffel of Jagdgeschwader 5 –
163 (Note: According to Mombeek with III. Gruppe of Jagdgeschwader 5.)	17 August 1944	09:45	Yak-9	PQ 37 Ost TB-4	165	17 August 1944	10:07	Boston	PQ 37 Ost RA-6/7 vicinity of Kirkenes
164	17 August 1944	10:06	Boston	PQ 37 Ost RB-7	166	17 August 1944	10:08	Boston	PQ 37 Ost RA-5
– Stab of Jagdgeschwader 5 –
167	23 August 1944	12:37	P-39	PQ 37 Ost RC-6/6	170	16 September 1944	12:06	P-39	PQ 37 Ost RB
168	23 August 1944	12:38	P-39	PQ 37 Ost RD-4/9	171	26 September 1944	14:25	Yak-7	vicinity of Vadsø
169	16 September 1944	12:04	P-39	PQ 37 Ost RB	172	26 September 1944	14:36	Yak-9	vicinity of Vadsø
According to Mathews and Foreman, aerial victories 173 to 198 were not documented.
	16 October 1944	—	Boston			17 October 1944	—	Il-2	
	17 October 1944	—	Il-2		199 (Note: According to Mombeek, this was the 199th aerial victory claimed. Mathews and Foreman list this claim with an unknown claim number.)	22 October 1944	09:15	Boston	
	17 October 1944	—	Il-2		200	20 November 1944	11:00~	Pe-3	vicinity of Banak
– Stab of Jagdgeschwader 7 "Nowotny" –
201	21 March 1945	12:45~? (Note: According to Boehme, the combat leading to this aerial victory claim occurred at 09:15 in the vicinity of Dresden.)	B-17	vicinity of Wittenberge	205	24 March 1945	—	B-17	vicinity of Reichswald
202	22 March 1945	12:45	B-17	Cottbus-Bautzen-Dresden	206	31 March 1945	—	P-51	vicinity of Brandenburg
203	23 March 1945	—	B-24	vicinity of Chemnitz	207	6 April 1945? (Note: According to Mathews and Foreman on 4 April 1945.)	—	B-17	vicinity of Berlin
204	23 March 1945	—	B-24	vicinity of Chemnitz	208	6 April 1945?	—	B-17	vicinity of Berlin
