= List of aerial victories claimed by Kurt Bühligen =

Kurt Bühligen (13 December 1917 – 11 August 1985) was a Luftwaffe wing commander and fighter ace of Nazi Germany during World War II. He was credited with 112 enemy aircraft shot down in over 700 combat missions. His victories were all claimed over the Western Front and included 24 four-engine bombers and 47 Supermarine Spitfire fighters.

== List of aerial victories claimed ==
According to US historian David T. Zabecki, Bühligen was credited with 112 aerial victories. Spick and Obermaier also list him with 112 aerial victories, of which 40 were claimed over the North Africa, 72 over the Western Front including 24 four-engined heavy bombers, claimed in over 700 combat missions and a mission-to-claim ratio of 6.25. Forsyth also lists him with 24 four-engined bombers shot down. Mathews and Foreman, authors of Luftwaffe Aces — Biographies and Victory Claims, researched the German Federal Archives and found records for more than 99 aerial victory claims, plus nine further unconfirmed claims. All of his victories were claimed on the Western Front and include 13 four-engined bombers.

Victory claims were logged to a map-reference (PQ = Planquadrat), for example "PQ 05 Ost 1157". The Luftwaffe grid map (Jägermeldenetz) covered all of Europe, western Russia and North Africa and was composed of rectangles measuring 15 minutes of latitude by 30 minutes of longitude, an area of about 360 square miles (930 km^{2}). These sectors were then subdivided into 36 smaller units to give a location area 3 km × 4 km (1.9 mi × 2.5 mi) in size.

♠ (Ace of spades) indicates those aerial victories which made Bühlingen an "ace-in-a-day", a term which designates a fighter pilot who has shot down five or more airplanes in a single day.
– (dash) indicates unconfirmed aerial victory claims for which Bühlingen did not receive credit.
* (asterisk) indicates an Herausschuss (separation shot)—a severely damaged heavy bomber forced to separate from his combat box which was counted as an aerial victory.
? (question mark) indicates information discrepancies listed by Prien, Stemmer, Rodeike, Bock, Mathews and Foreman.

Claim	Date	Time	Type	Location	Claim	Date	Time	Type	Location
– 2. Staffel of Jagdgeschwader 2 "Richthofen" – At the Channel and over England — 26 June – September 1940
1	4 September 1940	10:00	Hurricane	Dover					
– 6. Staffel of Jagdgeschwader 2 "Richthofen" – At the Channel and over England — September – November 1940
2	11 September 1940	16:35	Hurricane		6	7 October 1940	16:52	Hurricane	südlich Portland
3? (Note: According to Mathews and Foreman this claim is unconfirmed.)	26 September 1940	—	Spitfire		7?	7 October 1940	—	Hurricane	südlich Portland
4	30 September 1940	12:28	Spitfire	north of Portland	8	7 November 1940	15:28	Hurricane	southeast of the Isle of Wight
5?	1 October 1940	—	Hurricane	südlich Bournemouth					
– 4. Staffel of Jagdgeschwader 2 "Richthofen" – At the Channel and over England — November 1940 – 21 June 1941
— (Note: This unconfirmed claim is listed by Mathews and Foreman. However, Prien, Stemmer, Rodeike and Bock do not list this claim.)	10 November 1940	15:45	Spitfire	east of Portland	10	21 June 1941	16:50	Spitfire	Boulogne-Le Touquet
—	28 November 1940	17:20	Spitfire	Isle of Wight	11	21 June 1941	16:51	Spitfire	Boulogne-Le Touquet
9	21 June 1941	16:36	Spitfire	Boulogne-Hardelot					
– 4. Staffel of Jagdgeschwader 2 "Richthofen" – At the Channel and over England — 22 June – August 1941
12	7 July 1941	15:32	Spitfire		16	23 July 1941	13:23	Spitfire	Forest of Éperlecques
13	10 July 1941	12:18	Spitfire		17	23 July 1941	13:27	Spitfire	Forest of Éperlecques
14	10 July 1941	12:21	Spitfire		18	7 August 1941	17:48	Spitfire	
15	11 July 1941	14:55	Spitfire						
– Stab II. Gruppe of Jagdgeschwader 2 "Richthofen" – At the Channel and over England — 22 June – 31 December 1941
19	12 August 1941	19:07	Hurricane		22	21 August 1941	15:09	Spitfire	
20	16 August 1941	19:42	Spitfire		23	26 August 1941	16:22	Spitfire	
21	19 August 1941	12:01	Spitfire		24?	4 September 1941	—	Spitfire	
– 4. Staffel of Jagdgeschwader 2 "Richthofen" – At the Channel and over England — 1 January – 17 November 1942
25	19 August 1942	08:10	Spitfire		27?	19 August 1942	13:24	Spitfire	60 km (37 mi) north of Saint-Valery
26	19 August 1942	13:24	Spitfire	Dieppe harbor	28?	19 August 1942	16:53	Spitfire	60 km (37 mi) north of Saint-Valery
– 4. Staffel of Jagdgeschwader 2 "Richthofen" – Mediterranean Theater — 17 November – 31 December 1942
29	3 December 1942	10:55	Spitfire	south of Tebourba	31	26 December 1942	13:22	P-38	5 km (3.1 mi) east of Djebel Abiod
30	18 December 1942	11:06	Spitfire	10 km (6.2 mi) west of Djebel Quantra	32	26 December 1942	13:40	P-38	south of Djebel Taboussa
– 4. Staffel of Jagdgeschwader 2 "Richthofen" – Mediterranean Theater — 1 January – 22 March 1943
33	4 January 1943	10:40	P-40	3 km (1.9 mi) west of Fondouk; 8 km (5.0 mi) southwest of Tdidjana	51	4 February 1943	16:12	Spitfire	south of Ousseltia
? (Note: According to Mathews and Foreman, on 4 January 1943 Bühlingen shot down a Martin B-26 Marauder bomber for his 28th aerial victory. However, Prien, Stemmer, Rodeike and Bock attribute this claim to Leutnant Werner Klein-Korres.)	4 January 1943	10:44	B-26	Pont du Fahs; 15 km (9.3 mi) south-southwest of Tdidjana	52	4 February 1943	16:13	Spitfire	southwest of Ousseltia
34	8 January 1943	14:41? (Note: According to Mathews and Foreman claimed at 14:47.)	P-38	40 km (25 mi) southwest of Gabès; 20 km (12 mi) south of Kairouan	53	4 February 1943	16:16	Spitfire	20 km (12 mi) south of Ousseltia
35	8 January 1943	15:29	P-38	5 km (3.1 mi) south of Porto Farina; 2 km (1.2 mi) west of Djebel Touil	54	9 February 1943	13:51	P-40	Djebel Bou Dabous
36	8 January 1943	15:42	P-38	southwest of Kairouan south of Djebel Abeid	55	9 February 1943	13:53	P-40	south of Djebel Bou Dabous
37	14 January 1943	12:50	P-38	40 km (25 mi) east of Gabès; 40 km (25 mi) east of El Ayaisch	56	10 February 1943	13:45	Spitfire	east of Sidi Bouzid
38	21 January 1943	08:39	P-40	south of Pichon	57	14 February 1943	08:25	Spitfire	Hajeb El Ayoun
? (Note: According to Mathews and Foreman, on 21 January 1943 Bühlingen shot down a Curtiss P-40 Warhawk fighter for his 34th aerial victory. However, Prien, Stemmer, Rodeike and Bock attribute this claim to Leutnant Lothar Werner.)	21 January 1943	08:44	P-40	west of Djebel-Trozza	58	14 February 1943	11:00	Spitfire	20 km (12 mi) west of Sidi Bouzid
39	28 January 1943	14:15	P-38	9 km (5.6 mi) southwest of Kairouan	59	14 February 1943	11:02	Spitfire	25 km (16 mi) west of Sidi Bouzid
40	30 January 1943	07:38? (Note: According to Mathews and Foreman claimed at 07:36.)	Spitfire	30 km (19 mi) west-northwest of Kairouan northwest of Djebel el Rahan	60	14 February 1943	16:21	Spitfire	northwest of Djebel-Trozza
41	30 January 1943	07:40	Spitfire	35 km (22 mi) northwest of Kairouan	61	15 February 1943	14:59	P-38	15 km (9.3 mi) southwest of Fondouk
42♠	2 February 1943	08:14	P-40	40 km (25 mi) northwest of Kairouan	62	15 February 1943	15:03	P-38	east of Djebel Merhiba
43♠	2 February 1943	08:16	P-40	south of Djebel Dret Dabous	63	15 February 1943	15:13	P-38	north of Djebel-Trozza
44♠	2 February 1943	08:17	P-39	20 km (12 mi) west of Kairouan	64	8 March 1943	09:38	Spitfire	7 km (4.3 mi) west of Kairouan
45♠	2 February 1943	08:20	P-40	20 km (12 mi) southwest of Kairouan	65	8 March 1943	09:39	Spitfire	5 km (3.1 mi) northeast of Djedeida
46♠	2 February 1943	09:15	Spitfire	14 km (8.7 mi) northeast of Kairouan	? (Note: According to Mathews and Foreman, on 12 March 1943 Bühlingen shot down a Lockheed P-38 Lightning fighter for his 62nd aerial victory. However, Prien, Stemmer, Rodeike and Bock do not list this claim.)	12 March 1943	04:27	P-38	southeast of Mateur
47	3 February 1943	09:00	Spitfire	30 km (19 mi) northwest of Kairouan	66? (Note: This claim is not listed by Mathews and Foreman.)	12 March 1943	14:22	B-17	east of La Sebala
48	3 February 1943	09:02	Spitfire	25 km (16 mi) southwest of Kairouan	67	12 March 1943	14:24	P-38	east of La Sebala
49	3 February 1943	09:04	Spitfire	4 km (2.5 mi) east of Pichon	68	12 March 1943	14:27	P-38	southeast of La Sebala
50	3 February 1943	09:06	Spitfire	5 km (3.1 mi) north of Pichon					
– 4. Staffel of Jagdgeschwader 2 "Richthofen" – On the Western Front — May 1943
69	15 May 1943	07:16	P-51	30 km (19 mi) north-northwest of Berck; PQ 05 Ost 1157	70	17 May 1943	10:58	Typhoon	north of Caen; PQ 15 West 1067
– Stab II. Gruppe of Jagdgeschwader 2 "Richthofen" – On the Western Front — July – 31 December 1943
—	1 July 1943	—	Typhoon	Hook of Holland	? (Note: According to Mathews and Foreman, on 2 September 1943 Bühlingen shot down a North American P-51 Mustang fighter for his 77th aerial victory. However, Prien, Stemmer, Rodeike and Bock do not list this claim.)	2 September 1943	09:50	P-51	northwest of Auxi-le-Château
71	4 July 1943	13:22	P-47	10 km (6.2 mi) northwest of Cap D'Antifer	81	6 September 1943	09:48	B-17	Vailly
72	4 July 1943	17:32	Spitfire	Flixecourt/Vauchelles	82?	6 September 1943	13:00	B-17	10 km (6.2 mi) northwest of Melun
73	14 July 1943	09:05	Spitfire	4 km (2.5 mi) northwest of Trouville	83	6 September 1943	13:10	B-17	5 km (3.1 mi) northwest of Fécamp
74	15 July 1943	16:34	Typhoon	Tours-en-Vimeu	84	6 September 1943	14:35	Spitfire	PQ 05 Ost 0178
75	16 July 1943	20:10	Spitfire	15 km (9.3 mi) west of Baie de Somme	85?	8 September 1943	09:00	Boston	20 km (12 mi) south of Lille
76	18 July 1943	18:35	Spitfire	PQ 05 Ost RD-5, Foucaucourt	86	9 September 1943	15:53	Spitfire	PQ 05 Ost 1167
77	30 July 1943	09:25	B-17	north of Rotterdam	87	3 October 1943	18:45	Spitfire	south of Aumale
78	30 July 1943	16:00	Typhoon	PQ 05 Ost 1159	88	14 October 1943	13:45	B-17	vicinity of Sneek
79	17 August 1943	17:22	B-17	south of Tongeren	89	26 November 1943	10:38	B-17	southeast of Paris
80	19 August 1943	12:43	Spitfire	9 km (5.6 mi) west of Abbeville					
– Stab II. Gruppe of Jagdgeschwader 2 "Richthofen" – On the Western Front — 1 January – 28 April 1944
90	29 January 1944	11:15	P-47	PQ 05 Ost PL vicinity of Durbuy	94	24 February 1944	12:30	B-24	PQ 05 Ost FR-9/GR-3; 1 km (0.62 mi) east of Dümmer See
91	5 February 1944	11:00	B-24	vicinity of Vendôme	95	25 February 1944	12:33	B-17	PQ 05 Ost TJ/TK; Dordrecht/Rotterdam
92	5 February 1944	11:50	P-47	southwest of Étampes	96	18 March 1944	13:21	B-24	10 km (6.2 mi) south-southwest of Forges
93	24 February 1944	12:28	B-17*	PQ 05 Ost FR	97	28 April 1944	12:05	B-17	PQ 04 Ost N/HF, 40 km (25 mi) east of Bourges
– Stab of Jagdgeschwader 2 "Richthofen" – On the Western Front — June – July 1944
98	6 June 1944	11:57	P-47	PQ 15 West UU-1/4, 10 km (6.2 mi) south of Orne Estuary	102	5 July 1944	10:55	P-47	PQ 15 West UU-6 vicinity of Dreux
99	7 June 1944	19:07	P-47	vicinity of Carpiquet	103	5 July 1944	15:49	P-47	PQ 05 Ost UB-8 vicinity of Bernay
100	7 June 1944	19:09	P-47	PQ 15 West UU-1, north of Caen	104	5 July 1944	15:52	P-51	PQ 05 Ost UB vicinity of Bernay
101	12 June 1944	06:04	P-47	PQ 04 Ost N/AC-5 vicinity of Dreux					
