= List of aerial victories claimed by Anton Hackl =

Anton "Toni" Hackl (25 March 1915 – 10 July 1984) was a German Luftwaffe military aviator during World War II, a fighter ace credited with 192 enemy aircraft shot down in over 1,000 combat missions. The majority of his victories were claimed over the Eastern Front, with 87 claims over the Western Front. Of his 87 victories over the Western Allies, at least 32 were four-engined bombers, a further 24 victories were unconfirmed.

== List of aerial victories claimed ==
According to US historian David T. Zabecki, Hackl was credited with 192 aerial victories. Bergström and Mikhailov state that Hackl flew about 1,000 combat missions and also list him with shooting down 192 enemy aircraft plus another 24 unconfirmed aerial victories. Of this figure, 105 victories were claimed while serving on the Eastern Front and 87 on the Western Front. Among these numbers are 34 four-engined bombers which puts him in second place behind Georg-Peter Eder as the leading daylight bomber claimant. Mathews and Foreman, authors of Luftwaffe Aces – Biographies and Victory Claims, researched the German Federal Archives and state that Hackl was credited with more than 180 aerial victories. This figure includes at least 103 claims made on the Eastern Front and 44 on the Western Front, including at least 16 four-engined bombers.

Victory claims were logged to a map-reference (PQ = Planquadrat), for example "PQ 35 Ost 53224". The Luftwaffe grid map (Jägermeldenetz) covered all of Europe, western Russia and North Africa and was composed of rectangles measuring 15 minutes of latitude by 30 minutes of longitude, an area of about 360 square miles (930 km^{2}). These sectors were then subdivided into 36 smaller units to give a location area 3 km × 4 km (1.9 mi × 2.5 mi) in size.

♠ (Ace of spades) indicates those aerial victories which made Hackl an "ace-in-a-day", a term which designates a fighter pilot who has shot down five or more airplanes in a single day.
– (dash) indicates unconfirmed aerial victory claims for which Hackl did not receive credit.
! (exclamation mark) indicates those aerial victories listed by Prien, Stemmer, Rodeike and Bock.
# (hash mark) indicates those aerial victories listed by Mathews and Foreman.
* (asterisk) indicates those aerial victories listed by Caldwell.
? (question mark) indicates information discrepancies listed by Prien, Stemmer, Rodeike, Bock, Mathews and Foreman.

| Claim! | Claim# | Date | Time | Type | Location | Claim! | Claim# | Date | Time | Type | Location |
– 5. Staffel of Jagdgeschwader 77 –
| 1 | 1 | 15 June 1940 | 09:07 | Hudson | Stavanger | 65 | 59 | 9 July 1942 | 18:47 | MiG-3 | Yelets |
| 2 | 2 | 15 June 1940 | 09:17 | Hudson | Stavanger | 66 | 60 | 11 July 1942 | 17:45 | LaGG-3 | Ramon |
| 3 | 3 | 21 June 1940 | 16:45 | Hampden | west of Hardangerfjord | 67 | 61 | 11 July 1942 | 18:03 | LaGG-3 | Ramon |
| 4 | 4 | 27 June 1940 | 09:56 | Hudson | southwest of Stavanger off the Norwegian Coast | 68 | 62 | 12 July 1942 | 08:41 | Yak-1 | Krasny Oktyabr |
| 5 | 5 | 1 August 1941 | 17:50 | I-16 | Tiraspol | — | — | 14 July 1942 | — | LaGG-3 | |
| 6 | — | 10 August 1941 | — | I-16 | Nikolajew | — | — | 21 July 1942 | — | LaGG-3 | |
| 7 | 6 | 10 August 1941 | 18:35 | I-16 | Nikolajew | 69♠ | 63 | 21 July 1942 | 16:32 | LaGG-3 | Dubowskoje |
| 8 | 7 | 22 August 1941 | 12:30 | I-15 | Jargolitzkij | 70♠ | — | 21 July 1942 | — | LaGG-3 | Zadonsk |
| 9 | 8 | 1 September 1941 | 15:20 | R-Z? (Note: According to Mathews and Foreman claimed as a Polikarpov R-5.) | Chaplynka | 71♠ | 64 | 21 July 1942 | 18:49 | LaGG-3 | Zadonsk |
| 10 | 9 | 7 September 1941 | 13:50 | I-16 | Ivanovka | 72♠ | 65 | 21 July 1942 | 19:15 | Hurricane | Semljansk |
| 11 | 10 | 11 September 1941 | 18:18 | MiG-3 | Chaplynka | 73♠ | 66 | 21 July 1942 | 19:18 | Hurricane | |
| 12 | 11 | 14 September 1941 | — | MiG-3 | Perekop | 74 | 67 | 22 July 1942 | 17:05 | Pe-2 | Semilniki |
| 13 | 12 | 22 September 1941 | 15:55 | MiG-3 | Bakal | 75♠ | 68 | 23 July 1942 | 12:25 | Pe-2 | Semljansk |
| — | — | 23 September 1941 | — | MiG-3 | Budanowka | 76♠ | 69 | 23 July 1942 | 15:08 | Pe-2 | Semljansk |
| 14 | 13 | 9 October 1941 | 11:35 | Il-2 | Pologi | 77♠ | 70 | 23 July 1942 | 15:15 | Pe-2 | Semljansk |
| 15 | 14 | 11 October 1941 | 12:50 | SB-2 | Taganrog | 78♠ | 71 | 23 July 1942 | 19:03 | Il-2 | Semljansk |
| 16 | 15 | 11 October 1941 | 12:55 | R-Z? | Taganrog | 79♠ | 72 | 23 July 1942 | 19:06 | Il-2 | Priwoje |
| 17 | 16 | 23 October 1941 | 06:25 | MiG-3 | Rostov | 80♠ | 73 | 23 July 1942 | 19:10 | Il-2 | Ramon |
| 18 | 17 | 27 October 1941 | 11:50 | MiG-3 | Rostov | 81 | 74 | 24 July 1942 | 11:05 | Hurricane | Dimitrjaschewska |
| 19 | 18 | 31 October 1941 | 10:50 | MiG-3 | Taganrog | 82 | 75 | 24 July 1942 | 11:28 | Pe-2 | Bol. Bojewka |
| 20 | 19 | 31 October 1941 | 11:05 | MiG-3 | Taganrog | 83 | 76 | 24 July 1942 | 18:25 | Hurricane | Ramon |
| 21 | — | 31 October 1941 | — | MiG-3 | | 84 | 77 | 25 July 1942 | 18:13 | Pe-2 | Malinowo |
| 22 | 20 | 17 November 1941 | 10:40 | MiG-3 | Rostov | 85 | 78 | 25 July 1942 | 18:40 | LaGG-3 | Zadonsk |
| 23 | 21 | 17 November 1941 | 13:37 | I-153 | Rostov | 86 | 79 | 26 July 1942 | 10:30 | Il-2 | Semljansk |
| 24 | 22 | 27 November 1941 | 08:55 | Il-2 | Generalskaja | 87 | 80 | 26 July 1942 | 10:32 | Il-2 | Semljansk |
| 25 | 23 | 27 November 1941 | 11:55 | MiG-3 | Taganrog | 88 | 81 | 26 July 1942 | 10:35 | Il-2 | Semljansk |
| 26 | 24 | 27 November 1941 | 11:57 | DB-3 | | 89 | 82 | 27 July 1942 | 18:03 | MiG-1 | Semljansk |
| 27 | 25 | 24 March 1942 | 15:25 | I-16 | Ak-Monaj | 90 | 83 | 28 July 1942 | 06:25 | MiG-3 | Malinowo |
| 28 | 26 | 26 March 1942 | 07:18 | SB-3 | Armandli | 91 | 84 | 28 July 1942 | 18:15 | Douglas DB-7 (Boston) | PQ 92354, Woronesh; 10 km (6.2 mi) east of Voronezh |
| 29 | 27 | 26 March 1942 | 07:20 | SB-3 | Keneges | 92 | 85 | 29 July 1942 | 06:49 | MiG-1 | Werchnaja-Kolybelka; 55 km (34 mi) south-southeast of Yelets |
| 30 | 28 | 26 March 1942 | 15:25 | SB-3 | Keneges | 93 | 86 | 29 July 1942 | 06:50 | MiG-1 | PQ 93572, Zadonsk; 50 km (31 mi) southwest of Lipetsk |
| 31 | 29 | 4 April 1942 | 09:47 | R-Z? | Oisul | 94 | 87 | 29 July 1942 | 06:53 | MiG-1 | PQ 93532, Borinskoje; 50 km (31 mi) south of Lipetsk |
| 32 | 30 | 8 April 1942 | 17:30 | I-61 (MiG-3) | Alibay | 95 | 88 | 31 July 1942 | 06:35 | R-5 | PQ 83621, Yelets; 20 km (12 mi) south-southeast of Yelets |
| 33 | 31 | 16 April 1942 | 17:05 | I-61 (MiG-3) | Sevastopol | 96 | 89 | 3 August 1942 | 05:20 | Pe-2 | PQ 83554, Zadonsk; 30 km (19 mi) south-southwest of Yelets |
| 34♠ | 32 | 19 April 1942 | 10:10 | I-61 (MiG-3) | Keneges | 97 | 90 | 3 August 1942 | 18:49 | Il-2 | PQ 72282, Kshen; 50 km (31 mi) east-northeast of Tim |
| 35♠ | 33 | 19 April 1942 | 10:13 | R-Z? | Alibay | 98 | 91 | 3 August 1942 | 18:51 | Il-2 | PQ 72231, Wolowo; 55 km (34 mi) south-southeast of Livny |
| 36♠ | 34 | 19 April 1942 | 12:15 | I-61 (MiG-3) | Kurulu | 99 | 92 | 5 August 1942 | 08:40 | Hurricane | PQ 83664, Zadonsk; 40 km (25 mi) southeast of Yelets |
| 37♠ | 35 | 19 April 1942 | 12:20 | R-Z? | Semi Kolodesj | 100 | 93 | 5 August 1942 | 08:45 | Hurricane | PQ 83483, Yelets; 15 km (9.3 mi) southeast of Yelets |
| 38♠ | 36 | 19 April 1942 | 17:15 | I-180 (Yak-7) | Semi Kolodesj | 101 | 94 | 6 August 1942 | 11:10 | MiG-1 | PQ 83851, Malinowo; 60 km (37 mi) north-northwest of Voronezh |
| 39 | 37 | 20 April 1942 | 11:40 | I-26 (Yak-1) | Agibel | 102 | 95 | 6 August 1942 | 11:12 | LaGG-3 | PQ 83871, Semljansk; 60 km (37 mi) northwest of Voronezh |
| 40 | 38 | 2 May 1942 | 12:18 | MiG-1 | | 103 | 96 | 12 August 1942 | 14:05 | MiG-1 | PQ 83511; 50 km (31 mi) south of Yelets |
| 41 | 39 | 2 May 1942 | 12:25 | I-16 | | 104 | 97 | 12 August 1942 | 14:08 | MiG-1 | PQ 83671; 30 km (19 mi) south of Yelets |
| 42 | 40 | 8 May 1942 | 04:32 | I-16 | Wladislawowka | 105 | 98 | 13 August 1942 | 10:49 | Il-2 | PQ 83814; 50 km (31 mi) south of Yelets |
| 43 | 41 | 8 May 1942 | 05:10 | I-153 | Wladislawowka | 106 | 99 | 13 August 1942 | 10:53 | Il-2 | PQ 83672; 30 km (19 mi) south of Yelets |
| 44 | 42 | 8 May 1942 | 06:50 | I-16 | | 107 | | 14 August 1942 | 06:45 | MiG-1 | |
| 45 | 43 | 16 May 1942 | 11:48 | LaGG-3 | Kerch | 108 | 100 | 14 August 1942 | 18:20 | MiG-1 | PQ 82131; 60 km (37 mi) northwest of Voronezh |
| 46 | 44 | 19 May 1942 | 14:55 | Il-2 | 10 km (6.2 mi) east of Kerch | 109 | 101 | 25 August 1942 | 17:32 | Pe-2 | PQ 72292; 55 km (34 mi) east-northeast of Tim |
| 47 | 45 | 20 May 1942 | 13:40 | LaGG-3 | Kerch | 110 | 102 | 5 September 1942 | 17:15 | Il-2 | PQ 82153; 65 km (40 mi) northwest of Voronezh |
| 48 | — | 26 May 1942 | — | MiG-1 | Sevastopol | 111 | 103 | 5 September 1942 | 17:18 | Il-2 | PQ 82124; 65 km (40 mi) northwest of Voronezh |
| 49 | — | 27 May 1942 | — | LaGG-3 | Sevastopol | 112 | 104 | 5 September 1942 | 17:21 | Il-2 | PQ 82131; 60 km (37 mi) northwest of Voronezh |
| 50 | — | 27 May 1942 | — | MiG-1 | Sevastopol | 113 | 105 | 20 December 1942 | 07:45 | P-40 | PQ 13 Ost 62711 |
| 51 | 46 | 3 June 1942 | 13:36 | LaGG-3 | Cherssones | 114 | 106 | 20 December 1942 | 07:47 | P-40 | PQ 13 Ost 62761 |
| 52 | — | 4 June 1942 | — | I-180 (Yak-3) | Cherssones | 115 | 107 | 1 January 1943 | 11:00 | P-40 | 15 km (9.3 mi) south-southeast of airfield Zazur |
| 53 | 47 | 7 June 1942 | 07:03 | Il-2 | PQ 35473, Balaklava | 116 | 108 | 1 January 1943 | 11:07 | P-40 | 12 km (7.5 mi) southwest of airfield Zazur |
| 54 | 48 | 8 June 1942 | 04:30 | LaGG-3 | PQ 35471, Sevastopol | | 109 | 2 January 1943 | 10:22 | P-40 | 50 km (31 mi) west of Buerat |
| 55 | 49 | 8 June 1942 | 13:10 | MiG-1 | PQ 35392, Sevastopol | | 110 | 2 January 1943 | 10:27 | P-40 | southwest of Buerat |
| 56 | 50 | 8 June 1942 | 19:15 | Il-2 | PQ 35442, Sevastopol | | 111 | 2 January 1943 | 11:45 | P-40 | 5 km (3.1 mi) northwest of Buerat |
| 57 | 51 | 9 June 1942 | 19:22 | Il-2 | Sevastopol | 117 | | 2 January 1943 | 15:15 | P-40 | 5 km (3.1 mi) west-southwest of Buerat |
| 58 | 52 | 9 June 1942 | 19:25 | MiG-1? (Note: According to Mathews and Foreman claimed as a Mikoyan-Gurevich MiG-3.) | Sevastopol | 118 | 112 | 7 January 1943 | 12:03 | Spitfire | 10 km (6.2 mi) southeast of Hamraiet |
| 59 | 53 | 10 June 1942 | 08:15 | Il-2 | Sevastopol | 119 | 113 | 8 January 1943 | 16:25 | Spitfire | 20 km (12 mi) east of Bir Dufan; 10 km (6.2 mi) east of Guett el Goshia |
| 60 | 54 | 13 June 1942 | 12:25 | Yak-1 | Sevastopol | 120 | | 11 January 1943 | — | P-40 | |
| 61 | 55 | 13 June 1942 | 18:30 | Il-2 | Sevastopol | 121 | | 11 January 1943 | — | P-40 | |
| 62 | 56 | 2 July 1942 | 11:03 | MiG-3 | Anapa | 122 | | 11 January 1943 | — | P-40 | |
| 63 | 57 | 6 July 1942 | 14:30 | Douglas DB-7 (Boston) | Orlow | — | | 11 January 1943 | — | P-40 | |
| — | — | 8 July 1942 | — | P-39 | | 123 | | 14 January 1943 | — | P-40 | |
| 64 | 58 | 9 July 1942 | 18:45 | MiG-3 | Zadonsk | 124 | 114 | 19 January 1943 | 16:10 | P-40 | 5 km (3.1 mi) northwest of Tarhuna |
– Stab of Jagdgeschwader 11 –
| 125 | 115 | 25 June 1943 | 08:59 | B-17 | 6 km (3.7 mi) southwest of Friesoyte | 126 | 116 | 29 July 1943 | 09:35 | B-17 | 10 km (6.2 mi) northeast of Helgoland |
– Stab III. Gruppe of Jagdgeschwader 11 –
| 127 | 117 | 2 October 1943 | 17:31 | B-17 | PQ 05 Ost S/AO-6; 10 km (6.2 mi) north of Borkum | 139 | — | 18 March 1944 | 15:25~ | B-24 | vicinity of Freiburg |
| 128 | 118 | 8 October 1943 | 15:20 | B-17 | PQ 05 Ost S/DT-4/8 east of Bremen | 140 | 127 | 8 April 1944 | 13:45 | B-24 | PQ 15 Ost S/EB, south of Uelzen |
| 129 | 119 | 26 November 1943 | 12:02 | B-17 | Aurich-Bremen-Löningen | 141 | 128 | 11 April 1944 | 10:40 | B-24 | PQ 05 Ost S/FR/FQ, east of Lingen |
| 130 | 120 | 1 December 1943 | 12:16 | B-24 | Spa-Düren-Solingen | 142 | | 15 April 1944 | — | P-38 | |
| 131 | 121 | 5 January 1944 | 11:45 | P-38 | Neumünster-Itzehoe | 143 | 129 | 4 May 1944 | 10:27 | P-47 | PQ 05 Ost S/ET/ES, west of Verden |
| 132 | 122 | 11 January 1944 | 11:20 | B-17 | Goslar-Oschersleben | 144 | 130 | 8 May 1944 | 10:55 | B-17 | PQ 05 Ost S/ES/EU, west of Verden |
| 133 | 123 | 11 January 1944 | 11:29 | B-17 | Goslar-Oschersleben | 145 | 131 | 8 May 1944 | 12:00 | B-17 | PQ 05 Ost S/EU/ET, vicinity of Verden |
| 134 | — | 3 February 1944 | — | P-47 | north of Oldenburg | 146 | 132 | 12 May 1944 | 12:30 | B-17 | PQ 05 Ost S/QQ, vicinity of Wiesbaden |
| 135 | 124 | 10 February 1944 | 11:40 | B-17 | PQ 15 Ost S/FA, vicinity of Celle | 147 | 133 | 13 May 1944 | 13:50 | P-47 | PQ 15 Ost N/UA/TA, vicinity of Kiel |
| 136 | 125 | 24 February 1944 | 16:20 | B-17 | PQ 05 Ost S/AT-9, vicinity of Stade | 148 | | 19 May 1944 | — | B-17 | |
| 137 | 126 | 18 March 1944 | 15:15 | B-24 | PQ 04 Ost N/DQ, vicinity of Freiburg | 149 | | 22 May 1944 | 13:25~ | B-17 | |
| 138 | — | 18 March 1944 | 15:20~ | B-24 | vicinity of Freiburg | | | | | | |
Aerial victories 150 to 165 are not documented.
| Claim* | Claim# | Date | Time | Type | Location | Claim* | Claim# | Date | Time | Type | Location |
– II. Gruppe of Jagdgeschwader 26 –
| 166 | 134 | 28 October 1944 | 13:25 | Typhoon | Venlo-Kempen | 171 | 139 | 24 December 1944 | 12:30 | P-47 | Liège |
| 167 | 135 | 23 December 1944 | 12:52 | P-51 | Cologne-Bonn | 172 | 140 | 25 December 1944 | 11:55 | P-38 | Wesel |
| 168 | 136 | 23 December 1944 | 12:54 | Lancaster | Cologne | 173 | ? | 1 January 1945 | 09:25 | Spitfire | Brussels |
| 169 | 137 | 23 December 1944 | 12:56 | Mosquito | Cologne-Mönchen-Gladbach | 174 | ? | 14 January 1945 | 12:05 | P-47 | east of Liège |
| 170 | 138 | 24 December 1944 | 12:28 | P-47 | Liège | 175 | ? | 14 January 1945 | 12:15 | P-51 | Remscheid |
– Stab of Jagdgeschwader 300 –
| 176 | ? | 1 February 1945 | — | unknown | | | | | | | |
| Claim! | Claim# | Date | Time | Type | Location | Claim! | Claim# | Date | Time | Type | Location |
– Stab of Jagdgeschwader 11 –
| 177 | 178 | 7 March 1945 | 09:25 | Yak-9 | PQ 15 Ost 43–4–9–8, vicinity of Küstrin | | | | | | |
According to Prien and Rodeike, the 178th aerial victory was not documented.
| 179 | 179 | 23 March 1945 | 14:33 | Il-2 | PQ 15 Ost 43–9–1, vicinity of Küstrin | 180 | 180 | 23 March 1945 | 14:40 | Il-2 | PQ 15 Ost 43–9–1, vicinity of Küstrin |
According to Prien and Rodeike, aerial victories 181 to 192 were not documented.
