= List of aerial victories claimed by Wilhelm Batz =

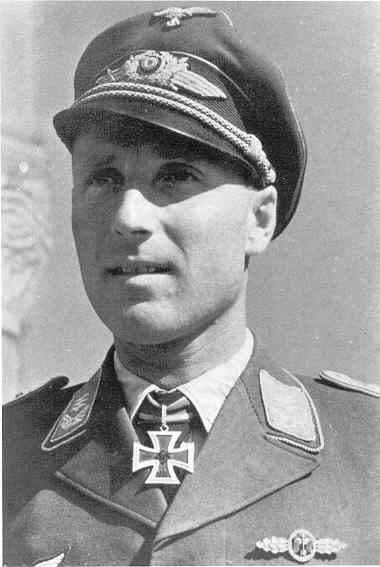
Batz as a Hauptmann (captain)

Wilhelm Batz (21 May 1916 – 11 September 1988) was a German Luftwaffe fighter ace during World War II. A flying ace or fighter ace is a military aviator credited with shooting down five or more enemy aircraft during aerial combat. Batz flew 445 combat missions and claimed 237 enemy aircraft shot down. 234 of these victories were achieved over the Eastern Front, including at least 46 Ilyushin Il-2 ground-attack aircraft, but he did claim three victories, including one four-engine bomber, against the United States Army Air Forces (USAAF) over the Ploieşti oil fields.

== List of aerial victories claimed ==
According to US historian David T. Zabecki, Batz was credited with 237 aerial victories. According to Spick, Batz was credited with 237 aerial victories claimed in 445 combat missions and a mission-to-claim ratio of 1.88. Of this figure, 232 aerial victories were claimed on the Eastern Front and five over the Western Allies, including two four-engine bombers. Mathews and Foreman, authors of Luftwaffe Aces — Biographies and Victory Claims, researched the German Federal Archives and found records for 233 confirmed and eight unconfirmed aerial victories, numerically ranging from 1 to 233, omitting the 223rd claim. All these victories were claimed on the Eastern Front. The authors Daniel and Gabor Horvath compared Soviet enemy loss reports to Batz's claims over Hungary. In the timeframe 13 to 19 March 1945, Batz claimed eight aerial victories, while the authors found seven matching Soviet losses, a corroboration of 88%.

Victory claims were logged to a map-reference (PQ = Planquadrat), for example "PQ 34 Ost 85131". The Luftwaffe grid map (Jägermeldenetz) covered all of Europe, western Russia and North Africa and was composed of rectangles measuring 15 minutes of latitude by 30 minutes of longitude, an area of about 360 square miles (930 km^{2}). These sectors were then subdivided into 36 smaller units to give a location area 3 km × 4 km (1.9 mi × 2.5 mi) in size.

♠ (Ace of spades) indicates those aerial victories which made Batz an "ace-in-a-day", a term which designates a fighter pilot who has shot down five or more airplanes in a single day.
– (dash) indicates unconfirmed aerial victory claims for which Batz did not receive credit.
? (question mark) indicates information discrepancies listed by Barbas, Prien, Stemmer, Rodeike, Balke, Bock, Mathews and Foreman.
! (exclamation mark) indicates that the authors Barbas, Prien, Stemmer, Rodeike, Balke, Bock, Mathews and Foreman disagree on the time of claim.
& (ampersand) indicates that the authors Barbas, Prien, Stemmer, Rodeike, Balke, Bock, Mathews and Foreman disagree on the date of claim.
* (asterisk) indicates that the authors Barbas, Prien, Stemmer, Rodeike, Balke, Bock, Mathews and Foreman disagree on the claimed aircraft type.

Claim	Date	Time	Type	Location	Claim	Date	Time	Type	Location
– Stab II. Gruppe of Jagdgeschwader 52 –
1	11 March 1943	15:15	LaGG-3	PQ 34 Ost 85131; Mingrelskaya	—	20 April 1943	16:10	LaGG-3	northwest of Gelendzhik; Nowor/Gelendzhik
2	13 March 1943	06:40	Boston	PQ 34 Ost 6662	6	20 April 1943	16:12	LaGG-3	PQ 34 Ost 75454, 10 km (6.2 mi) southwest of Kabardinka; Black Sea, 10 km (6.2 mi) south of Novorossiysk
3	15 April 1943	12:05	LaGG-3	PQ 34 Ost 85143; PQ 85113 east of Krymsk	7	20 April 1943	16:14	Il-2 m.H. (Note: The "m.H." refers to an Ilyushin Il-2 with rear gunner (mit Heckschütze).)	PQ 34 Ost 754927 km (4.3 mi) west of Gelendzhik; Black Sea, 10 km (6.2 mi) west of Gelendzhik
4	15 April 1943	15:17	LaGG-3	PQ 34 Ost 85184, 10 km (6.2 mi) southeast of Abinskaya southeast of Tscherkassowski	— (Note: This unconfirmed claim is not listed by Barbas, nor by Prien, Stemmer, Rodeike and Bock..)	6 May 1943	—	Yak-1	
5	20 April 1943	11:05	Il-2 m.H.	PQ 34 Ost 85273; PQ 85373; Gelendzhik	8	9 May 1943	17:00	Yak-1	PQ 34 Ost 76893, southeast of Kijewskoje south of Bakanskij
– 5. Staffel of Jagdgeschwader 52 –
9	10 June 1943	14:45	LaGG-3	PQ 34 Ost 75531, south of Anapa; Black Sea, 45 km (28 mi) west-southwest Gelendzhik	64♠	5 December 1943	05:50	Yak-1	east of Cape Warsowka
10	21 July 1943	16:43	Yak-1	PQ 34 Ost 75474; Black Sea, 10 km (6.2 mi) south of Novorossiysk	65♠	5 December 1943	06:10	Il-2 m.H.	southeast of Eltigen
11	22 July 1943	08:16! (Note: According to Mathews and Foreman claimed at 08:14.)	Il-2 m.H.	PQ 34 Ost 85141 east of Krymsk	66♠	5 December 1943	06:11	Yak-1* (Note: According to Barbas claimed as a Bell P-39 Airacobra.)	east of Eltigen
12	7 August 1943	17:50	P-39	PQ 34 Ost 76863, 8 km (5.0 mi) northwest of Kijewskoje; Kijewskoje	67♠	5 December 1943	08:35! (Note: According to Mathews and Foreman claimed at 08:33.)	P-39	west-southwest of Eltigen
13	9 August 1943	08:04	Yak-1	PQ 34 Ost 75233, Kijewskoje west of Krymsk	68♠	5 December 1943	08:50	Yak-1	southeast of Eltigen south of Eltigen
14	9 August 1943	18:15	Yak-1	PQ 34 Ost 75262, southwest of Krymskaja south of Krymsk	69♠	5 December 1943	14:07	Il-2 m.H.	northwest of Cape Takyl northwest of Cape Tusla
15	15 August 1943	17:35	Spitfire	PQ 34 Ost 76854 east of Varenikovskaya	70	6 December 1943	08:00	Yak-1	northeast of Eltigen
16	5 September 1943	12:19	Yak-1	PQ 35 Ost 60342; 5 km (3.1 mi) southeast of Taranovka	71	6 December 1943	08:06	Yak-1	south of Eltigen
17	5 September 1943	12:25	Yak-1	PQ 35 Ost 60354; 15 km (9.3 mi) southeast of Taranovka	72	6 December 1943	10:41	P-39	east of Eltigen
18	9 September 1943	06:29	Yak-1	PQ 35 Ost 50223; 5 km (3.1 mi) southwest of Olshany	73	7 December 1943	09:30	Yak-1*	north of Ketschegen
19	9 September 1943	06:37	Yak-1	PQ 35 Ost 60142; PQ 60611; Andrejewka	74	7 December 1943	09:38	Yak-1*	southwest of Gorkom
—	9 September 1943	06:45	Yak-1		75	7 December 1943	10:10	Il-2 m.H.* (Note: According to Barbas claimed as a Yakovlev Yak-1.)	southeast of Kerch
20	9 September 1943	16:50	Yak-1	PQ 35 Ost 50212; 20 km (12 mi) south-southeast of Bohodukhiv	76	10 February 1944	09:25	Yak-1	PQ 34 Ost 66641 vicinity of Bulganak east of Bulganak
21	25 September 1943	14:50	Yak-1	PQ 35 Ost 10114; 10 km (6.2 mi) southwest of Perejaslav-Chmel'nickij	77	10 February 1944	09:40	Yak-9	PQ 34 Ost 66562; Grammatikowo
22	3 October 1943	15:00	Yak-1*	PQ 34 Ost 58812; 10 km (6.2 mi) southwest of Bolschoj Tokmak	78	10 February 1944	15:05! (Note: According to Barbas, Mathews and Foreman claimed at 15:00.)	Yak-9	PQ 34 Ost 66641 vicinity of Bulganak east of Bulganak
23	5 October 1943	15:25	P-39	PQ 34 Ost 49323; PQ 49324	79	12 February 1944	10:47	Yak-1	PQ 34 Ost 66642; Majak
24	6 October 1943	07:30	Yak-1	PQ 34 Ost 4918; PQ 49185; 65 km (40 mi) northwest of Dnipropetrovsk	80	12 February 1944	11:15	Yak-1	PQ 34 Ost 66652; PQ 66562; Kerch
25	7 October 1943	06:53	La-5	PQ 34 Ost 49324; 60 km (37 mi) west-northwest of Dnipropetrovsk	81	12 February 1944	15:31	Yak-1	PQ 34 Ost 66564; Kerch
26	8 October 1943	13:20	Yak-1	PQ 34 Ost 66623; Iljitsch	82	14 February 1944	08:15	P-39* (Note: According to Barbas claimed as a Curtiss P-40 Warhawk.)	PQ 34 Ost 66592; Kamysh Burun
27	12 October 1943	09:40	La-5	PQ 34 Ost 49322; 60 km (37 mi) west-northwest of Dnipropetrovsk	83	14 February 1944	11:30	P-39	PQ 34 Ost 66644; Kolonka
28	12 October 1943	15:40	Yak-9	PQ 34 Ost 49314; Borodajewke	84	14 February 1944	11:50	Yak-1	PQ 34 Ost 66653; PQ 66534; Cape Tarchan
29	13 October 1943	15:45	La-5	PQ 35 Ost 10152; 20 km (12 mi) south of Perejaslav-Chmel'nickij	85	15 February 1944	09:10	P-39	PQ 34 Ost 66644; Kolonka
30	15 October 1943	06:15	La-5	PQ 35 Ost 10161; 20 km (12 mi) southeast of Perejaslav-Chmel'nickij	86	15 February 1944	14:30	Yak-1	PQ 34 Ost 66644; Kolonka
31	20 October 1943	10:10	Pe-2	PQ 34 Ost 39281, 2 km (1.2 mi) north of Petrowka; 30 km (19 mi) east-northeast of Mironowka	87	21 February 1944	13:15	Yak-1	PQ 34 Ost 66562; PQ 66562 or 66567 west of Tatarskij
32	20 October 1943	10:12	Yak-1	PQ 34 Ost 39251, 5 km (3.1 mi) northeast of Mlynok; 30 km (19 mi) southeast of Kremenchuk	88	26 February 1944	15:25	Yak-1	PQ 34 Ost 66562; Grammatikowo
33	21 October 1943	15:07	Il-2 m.H.	PQ 34 Ost 39612, northwest of Pjatichatki; Pjatichatki	89	1 March 1944	08:10	P-39	PQ 34 Ost 66644; Kolonka
34	25 October 1943	12:35	Yak-1	PQ 34 Ost 57182; 10 km (6.2 mi) southwest of Melitopol	90	2 March 1944	09:55	Yak-1	PQ 34 Ost 66644; PQ 66534; Cape Tarchan
35	25 October 1943	12:40	Yak-1	PQ 34 Ost 57183; 10 km (6.2 mi) southwest of Melitopol	91	3 March 1944	13:55	P-40	PQ 34 Ost 66642; Majak
36	29 October 1943	11:00	Yak-1	PQ 34 Ost 47183; 25 km (16 mi) northwest of Ivanovka	92	10 March 1944	14:25! (Note: According to Barbas, Mathews and Foreman claimed at 14:28.)	P-39	PQ 34 Ost 66643; Kerch
—	13 November 1943	—	Yak-1	vicinity of Bagerowo	93	10 March 1944	14:33	P-39	PQ 34 Ost 66812; Taman
37	15 November 1943	12:10	Yak-1	PQ 34 Ost 66564; Kerch	94	11 March 1944	11:45	Yak-1	PQ 34 Ost 47773; Tachigary
38	16 November 1943	11:40	Yak-1	PQ 34 Ost 66832, northwest of Bakssy; PQ 66641 east of Bulganak	95	11 March 1944	16:15	Yak-7	PQ 34 Ost 37862; 20 km (12 mi) east of Perekop
39	16 November 1943	13:50	Yak-1	PQ 34 Ost 66692; Achtanisowskaja	96	13 March 1944	13:30	Yak-1	PQ 34 Ost 66613; Malyj
40	16 November 1943	14:15	Yak-1	PQ 34 Ost 66661; Sea, west of Zaporozhskaya	97	14 March 1944	13:06	Yak-1	PQ 34 Ost 47784; 40 km (25 mi) north of Dzhankoi
41	19 November 1943	15:20	Yak-1	PQ 34 Ost 66641, northwest of Bakssy east of Bulganak	98	17 March 1944	08:40	Yak-7	PQ 34 Ost 47744 vicinity of Chigari
42	21 November 1943	09:15	Yak-1	PQ 34 Ost 66643, Kolonka east of Bakssy	99	19 March 1944	07:25! (Note: According to Barbas claimed at 07:28.)	P-39	PQ 34 Ost 66612 east of Cape Khroni
43	21 November 1943	09:40	Yak-1	PQ 34 Ost 66671, east of Kerch	100	22 March 1944	10:43	Yak-1	PQ 34 Ost 66538, south of Cape Tarchan; PQ 66532; Cape Tarchan
44	25 November 1943	11:10	LaGG-3	PQ 34 Ost 66642, north of Majak; Adshim-Uschkaj	101	22 March 1944	14:02	P-39	PQ 34 Ost 66532; Cape Tarchan
45	26 November 1943	07:40	Yak-1	PQ 34 Ost 66561; Malyj	102	1 April 1944	15:50! (Note: According to Mathews and Foreman claimed at 16:10.)	Yak-7*	PQ 34 Ost 65211; Sea, southeast of Cape Takyl
46	26 November 1943	10:37	Yak-1	PQ 34 Ost 66812, northwest of Taman west of Taman	103	1 April 1944	16:20! (Note: According to Barbas claimed at 16:10. Mathews and Foreman state at 16:50.)	Yak-7	PQ 34 Ost 65211; Sea, southeast of Cape Takyl
47	27 November 1943	13:45	Yak-1	PQ 34 Ost 66814, southwest of Taman; Krotkow	104	5 April 1944	17:02! (Note: According to Mathews and Foreman claimed at 17:12.)	Yak-1	PQ 34 Ost 46112; Grammatikowo
48	28 November 1943	11:27	Yak-1	PQ 34 Ost 66594; Kamysh Burun	105	6 April 1944	13:55	Yak-7	PQ 34 Ost 47774; PQ 47771 south of Gromovka
49	28 November 1943	11:33	P-39	PQ 34 Ost 66812, northwest of Taman west of Taman	106	7 April 1944	07:15! (Note: According to Mathews and Foreman claimed at 04:15.)	Yak-7*	PQ 34 Ost 47784; 40 km (25 mi) north of Dzhankoi
50	30 November 1943	10:20	Il-2 m.H.	PQ 34 Ost 66841, south of Kossa Tusla; Sea, southwest of Taman	107♠	8 April 1944	12:25	Yak-7	PQ 34 Ost 37891; 20 km (12 mi) southeast of Perekop
51♠	1 December 1943	07:20	Yak-1	PQ 34 Ost 66733, southeast of Eltigen; Sea, east of Eltigen	108♠	8 April 1944	13:07	Yak-7	PQ 34 Ost 37894; 20 km (12 mi) southeast of Perekop
52♠	1 December 1943	07:23	Il-2 m.H.	west of Cape Tusla	109♠	8 April 1944	14:55	Yak-7*	PQ 34 Ost 47771 south of Gromovka
53♠	1 December 1943	11:10	Il-2	PQ 34 Ost 66731, south of Eltigen east of Eltigen	110♠	8 April 1944	15:08	Yak-7	PQ 34 Ost 47774; Tachigary
54♠	1 December 1943	14:09	Yak-1	southeast of Eltigen	111♠	8 April 1944	16:28! (Note: According to Barbas, Mathews and Foreman claimed at 15:10.)	Il-2 m.H.	PQ 34 Ost 47783; 40 km (25 mi) north of Dzhankoi
55♠	1 December 1943	14:10	Il-2 m.H.	south of Eltigen	112♠	8 April 1944	17:20! (Note: According to Barbas, Mathews and Foreman claimed at 17:10.)	Il-2 m.H.	PQ 34 Ost 46112; Grammatikowo
56♠	2 December 1943	11:05	Yak-1	PQ 34 Ost 66673, west of Taman; PQ 66637; Kossa Tusla	113♠	10 April 1944	12:27	P-39* (Note: According to Barbas claimed as a Yakovlev Yak-7.)	PQ 34 Ost 46114 east of Tomoschewka
57♠	2 December 1943	11:35	Il-2	PQ 34 Ost 66811; Sea, Cape Tusla	114♠	10 April 1944	12:28	P-39	PQ 34 Ost 46114 east of Tomoschewka
58♠	2 December 1943	13:53	LaGG-3	west of Gorkam	115♠	10 April 1944	12:29	P-39	PQ 34 Ost 46114 east of Tomoschewka
59♠	2 December 1943	14:15	Il-2 m.H.	northeast of Eltigen	116♠	10 April 1944	15:45	Yak-7* (Note: According to Barbas, Mathews and Foreman claimed as a Yakovlev Yak-1.)	PQ 34 Ost 46114 east of Tomoschewka
60♠	2 December 1943	14:19	Il-2 m.H.	southeast of Kerch; Kerch	117♠	10 April 1944	15:48	Yak-7	PQ 34 Ost 46114 east of Tomoschewka
61	4 December 1943	06:30	Il-2 m.H.	south of Eltigen	118	11 April 1944	14:15	Yak-7	PQ 34 Ost 36234; 25 km (16 mi) southeast of Perekop
62	4 December 1943	08:20	Yak-1	northeast of Eltigen	119	13 April 1944	11:15	Yak-7* (Note: According to Mathews and Foreman claimed as a Douglas A-20 Havoc "Boston".)	vicinity of Sarabus north-northeast of Sarabus
63	4 December 1943	09:15	Il-2 m.H.	southwest of Eltigen	120	13 April 1944	11:20	Yak-1	PQ 34 Ost 46743; 10 km (6.2 mi) north of Sarabus
– Stab I. Gruppe of Jagdgeschwader 52 –
121	29 April 1944	18:02	Yak-7	PQ 24 Ost 78673 vicinity of Carpiti; 15 km (9.3 mi) north of Iași	128	3 May 1944	15:00! (Note: According to Barbas, Mathews and Foreman claimed at 15:01.)	Yak-7*	PQ 24 Ost 68832, north of Târgu Frumos; PQ 68834
122♠	2 May 1944	13:00	P-39	PQ 24 Ost 78711; 25 km (16 mi) northeast of Iași	129	5 May 1944	12:18	La-5	PQ 24 Ost 68822; 10 km (6.2 mi) west of Târgu Frumos
123♠	2 May 1944	13:07	Yak-1	PQ 24 Ost 68834 north of Târgu Frumos	130	5 May 1944	12:24	La-5	PQ 24 Ost 68831 north of Târgu Frumos
124♠	2 May 1944	15:10	Il-2 m.H.	PQ 24 Ost 78753; 20 km (12 mi) west-northwest of Iași	131	7 May 1944	15:20	Pe-2	PQ 24 Ost 68672; 30 km (19 mi) north-northwest of Kishinev
125♠	2 May 1944	15:15	P-39	PQ 24 Ost 78723; 20 km (12 mi) north-northeast of Roman	132	10 May 1944	11:25	La-5	PQ 24 Ost 98754; 5 km (3.1 mi) south of Grigoriopol
126♠	2 May 1944	17:22! (Note: According to Mathews and Foreman claimed at 14:22.)	P-39	PQ 24 Ost 78742; 20 km (12 mi) west of Iași	133	10 May 1944	11:27	La-5	PQ 24 Ost 98761; 10 km (6.2 mi) southeast of Grigoriopol
127	3 May 1944	14:45! (Note: According to Barbas claimed at 15:45.)	P-39	PQ 24 Ost 78712; 25 km (16 mi) northeast of Iași					
– Stab III. Gruppe of Jagdgeschwader 52 –
134	20 May 1944	13:20	LaGG	PQ 24 Ost 98743; 15 km (9.3 mi) west-southwest of Grigoriopol	182	18 July 1944	15:35	LaGG	PQ 25 Ost 41375; PQ 41395; 30 km (19 mi) south of Wlodzimierz
135	20 May 1944	13:34! (Note: According to Mathews and Foreman claimed at 18:34.)	LaGG	PQ 24 Ost 98742; 15 km (9.3 mi) west-southwest of Grigoriopol	183	18 July 1944	18:00	LaGG	PQ 25 Ost 40259; 10 km (6.2 mi) northwest of Zolochiv
136	20 May 1944	18:35	LaGG	PQ 24 Ost 98742; 15 km (9.3 mi) west-southwest of Grigoriopol	184♠	19 July 1944	15:57	LaGG	PQ 25 Ost 32832; Luboml
137	20 May 1944	18:35	LaGG	PQ 24 Ost 98742; 15 km (9.3 mi) west-southwest of Grigoriopol	185♠	19 July 1944	16:05	LaGG	PQ 25 Ost 42712; Luboml
138	30 May 1944	11:20	LaGG	PQ 24 Ost 78678; 15 km (9.3 mi) north of Iași	186♠	19 July 1944	19:40	LaGG	PQ 25 Ost 32889; PQ 32883; 20 km (12 mi) east-southeast of Kholm
139	30 May 1944	11:29	P-39	PQ 24 Ost 78674; 8 km (5.0 mi) north of Iași	187♠	19 July 1944	19:45	Il-2 m.H.	PQ 25 Ost 31223; 25 km (16 mi) southeast of Kholm
140	30 May 1944	17:36! (Note: According to Mathews and Foreman claimed at 17:31.)	P-39	PQ 24 Ost 78812; 10 km (6.2 mi) south of Iași	188♠	19 July 1944	19:46	Il-2 m.H.	PQ 25 Ost 31234; 25 km (16 mi) northeast of Hostynne
141♠	31 May 1944	06:50	LaGG	PQ 24 Ost 78683; 20 km (12 mi) northeast of Iași	189♠	19 July 1944	19:51	Il-2 m.H.	PQ 25 Ost 32899; PQ 82899
142♠	31 May 1944	06:57	Il-2 m.H.	PQ 24 Ost 78679; 15 km (9.3 mi) north of Iași	190	21 July 1944	16:42	P-39	PQ 25 Ost 40142; Lvov
143♠	31 May 1944	07:05	Il-2 m.H.	PQ 24 Ost 78812 vicinity of Iași; 10 km (6.2 mi) south of Iași	191	26 July 1944	17:12! (Note: According to Barbas, Mathews and Foreman claimed at 17:18.)	LaGG	PQ 25 Ost 30517; PQ 30377; 10 km (6.2 mi) west of Sambir
144♠	31 May 1944	07:13	Il-2 m.H.	PQ 24 Ost 78812; PQ 78814; 10 km (6.2 mi) south of Iași	192	26 July 1944	17:22	LaGG	PQ 25 Ost 30511; 10 km (6.2 mi) southwest of Sambir
145♠	31 May 1944	07:15	Il-2 m.H.	PQ 24 Ost 78812; PQ 78823; 10 km (6.2 mi) south of Iași	193? (Note: According to Mathews and Foreman this claim is unconfirmed. Prien, Stemmer, Balke and Bock do not list this claim.)	7 August 1944	—	B-24	
146♠	31 May 1944	11:17	P-39	PQ 24 Ost 78679; 15 km (9.3 mi) north of Iași	194	12 August 1944	11:50	Pe-2	PQ 25 Ost 11342; 30 km (19 mi) southwest of Opatów
147♠	31 May 1944	11:20	P-39	PQ 24 Ost 78678; 15 km (9.3 mi) north of Iași	195	12 August 1944	11:52	LaGG	PQ 25 Ost 11343; 30 km (19 mi) southwest of Opatów
148♠	31 May 1944	11:24	P-39	PQ 24 Ost 78672; Sulani	196	12 August 1944	15:58	LaGG	PQ 25 Ost 11355; 20 km (12 mi) south-southwest of Opatów
149♠	31 May 1944	11:33	P-39	PQ 24 Ost 78654; PQ 78657; 15 km (9.3 mi) southeast of Tudora	197	15 August 1944	11:45	Il-2 m.H.	PQ 25 Ost 11514; 25 km (16 mi) northwest of Mielec
150♠	31 May 1944	11:39	P-39* (Note: According to Barbas, Mathews and Foreman claimed as a Lavochkin-Gorbunov-Gudkov aircraft.)	PQ 24 Ost 78673; 15 km (9.3 mi) north of Iași	198	15 August 1944	11:50	Il-2 m.H.	PQ 25 Ost 11527; PQ 11524; 20 km (12 mi) north-northwest of Mielec
151♠	31 May 1944	16:30	LaGG	PQ 24 Ost 78812; PQ 78678; 15 km (9.3 mi) north of Iași	199	15 August 1944	11:57! (Note: According to Barbas claimed at 11:51, Mathews and Foreman state at 11:55.)	LaGG	PQ 25 Ost 11525; 20 km (12 mi) north-northwest of Mielec
152♠	31 May 1944	16:45	LaGG	PQ 24 Ost 78812; PQ 78566; 15 km (9.3 mi) southwest of Tudora	200♠	17 August 1944	08:23	LaGG	PQ 25 Ost 11186; 10 km (6.2 mi) west of Opatów
153♠	31 May 1944	17:05	Il-2 m.H.	PQ 24 Ost 78812; PQ 78814; 10 km (6.2 mi) south of Iași	201♠	17 August 1944	12:39	P-39	PQ 25 Ost 11277; 15 km (9.3 mi) east-southeast of Opatów
154♠	31 May 1944	17:08	Il-2 m.H.	PQ 24 Ost 78812; PQ 78813; 10 km (6.2 mi) south of Iași	202♠	17 August 1944	12:41	P-39	PQ 25 Ost 11413; 15 km (9.3 mi) west of Sandomierz
155♠	31 May 1944	19:14	P-39	PQ 24 Ost 78359; 30 km (19 mi) northwest of Tudora	203♠	17 August 1944	12:48	Il-2 m.H.	PQ 25 Ost 11415; 15 km (9.3 mi) west of Sandomierz
156	2 June 1944	16:15	P-39	PQ 24 Ost 78558; 25 km (16 mi) west-southwest of Tudora	204♠	17 August 1944	19:25	P-39	PQ 25 Ost 11278; 15 km (9.3 mi) east-southeast of Opatów
157	3 June 1944	12:45! (Note: According to Barbas claimed at 11:45, Mathews and Foreman state at 19:45.)	P-39	PQ 24 Ost 78677; 15 km (9.3 mi) north of Iași	205♠	17 August 1944	19:30	LaGG	PQ 25 Ost 11261; 40 km (25 mi) east-southeast of Ostrowicz
158	3 June 1944	12:50	P-39	PQ 24 Ost 78677; 15 km (9.3 mi) north of Iași	206♠	22 August 1944	12:33	P-39	PQ 25 Ost 11275; 12 km (7.5 mi) east-southeast of Opatów
159	3 June 1944	13:35	P-39	PQ 24 Ost 78647; 10 km (6.2 mi) south of Tudora	207♠	22 August 1944	12:34	P-39* (Note: According to Barbas, Mathews and Foreman claimed as a Ilyushin Il-2 with rear gunner (mit Heckschütze).)	PQ 25 Ost 11284; PQ 11285; 10 km (6.2 mi) north of Sandomierz
160	4 June 1944	08:45	LaGG	PQ 24 Ost 78598; 15 km (9.3 mi) northwest of Iași	208♠	22 August 1944	12:34	P-39*	PQ 25 Ost 11285; PQ 11284; 10 km (6.2 mi) north of Sandomierz
161	4 June 1944	08:55	LaGG	PQ 24 Ost 78763; 10 km (6.2 mi) west of Iași	209♠	22 August 1944	18:47	P-39	PQ 25 Ost 11413; 15 km (9.3 mi) west of Sandomierz
162♠	5 June 1944	14:50! (Note: According to Barbas claimed at 14:56, Mathews and Foreman state at 14:51.)	LaGG	PQ 24 Ost 78566; 15 km (9.3 mi) southwest of Tudora	210♠	22 August 1944	18:49	P-39	PQ 25 Ost 11413; 15 km (9.3 mi) west of Sandomierz
163♠	5 June 1944	15:04	LaGG	PQ 24 Ost 78641; PQ 78671; 15 km (9.3 mi) north of Iași	211♠	22 August 1944	18:57	Il-2 m.H.	PQ 25 Ost 11287; 10 km (6.2 mi) north of Sandomierz
164♠	5 June 1944	15:06	LaGG	PQ 24 Ost 78569; 15 km (9.3 mi) southwest of Tudora	212	15 October 1944	14:18	Il-2 m.H.	PQ 25 Ost 16689; Resita
165♠	5 June 1944	15:14	LaGG	PQ 24 Ost 78671; 15 km (9.3 mi) north of Iași	213	15 October 1944	14:20! (Note: According to Mathews and Foreman claimed at 14:45.)	Il-2 m.H.	PQ 25 Ost 16689; Resita
166♠	5 June 1944	18:40	P-39	PQ 24 Ost 78586; 25 km (16 mi) northwest of Iași	214	16 October 1944	14:14	LaGG	PQ 25 Ost 25491; 15 km (9.3 mi) southeast of Turnu Serverin
167♠	5 June 1944	19:02	LaGG	PQ 24 Ost 78591; 15 km (9.3 mi) northwest of Iași	215	17 October 1944	09:42	LaGG	PQ 25 Ost 25459; Turnu Serverin
168♠	5 June 1944	19:07	LaGG	PQ 24 Ost 78594; Zahorne	216	17 October 1944	14:05	LaGG	PQ 25 Ost 25455; Turnu Serverin
169♠	5 June 1944	19:17	Il-2 m.H.	PQ 24 Ost 78672; PQ 48672; 20 km (12 mi) north of Bistritz	? (Note: Prien, Stemmer, Balke and Bock list this claim is listed as his 214 aerial victory. However, neither Barbas nor Mathews and Foreman list this claim.)	18 October 1944	—	LaGG	
170	8 June 1944	15:30	LaGG	PQ 24 Ost 78592; 15 km (9.3 mi) northwest of Iași	217	20 October 1944	14:07	La-5*	PQ 25 Ost 25399; 25 km (16 mi) south of Orsova
171	8 June 1944	16:25	LaGG	PQ 24 Ost 78644; PQ 78647; 10 km (6.2 mi) south of Tudora	218	20 October 1944	14:08	Il-2 m.H.	PQ 25 Ost 25477; 15 km (9.3 mi) southeast of Turnu Serverin
? (Note: Prien, Stemmer, Balke and Bock list this claim is listed as his 172nd aerial victory. However, neither Barbas nor Mathews and Foreman list this claim.)	15 June 1944	—	LaGG		219♠	23 October 1944	10:30	Il-2 m.H.	PQ 25 Ost 25388; 25 km (16 mi) northeast of Majdanpek
172?	23 June 1944	—	P-51		220♠	23 October 1944	10:33	LaGG	PQ 25 Ost 25523; 30 km (19 mi) southwest of Turnu Serverin
173?	23 June 1944	—	P-51		221♠	23 October 1944	10:43! (Note: According to Mathews and Foreman claimed at 10:13.)	LaGG	PQ 25 Ost 25533; 25 km (16 mi) south-southwest of Orsova
174?	24 June 1944	—	B-24		222♠	23 October 1944	14:00	LaGG	PQ 25 Ost 25397; 25 km (16 mi) south of Orsova
175	30 June 1944	15:25	LaGG	PQ 25 Ost 84469	223♠	23 October 1944	14:30	LaGG	PQ 25 Ost 25389; PQ 25349; 30 km (19 mi) west-southwest of Orsova
176	30 June 1944	15:33	Il-2 m.H.	PQ 25 Ost 84387; PQ 84287	224	26 October 1944	11:09	LaGG	PQ 25 Ost 25336; Orsova
177	30 June 1944	18:41! (Note: According to Barbas, Mathews and Foreman claimed at 18:49.)	LaGG	PQ 25 Ost 84112; PQ 94112	225	26 October 1944	11:10	LaGG	PQ 25 25338; Orsova
178	15 July 1944	20:00	P-39	PQ 25 Ost 41651; 40 km (25 mi) northwest of Brody	226	29 October 1944? (Note: According to Mathews and Foreman claimed om 26 October 1944.)	14:18	LaGG	PQ 25 Ost 25278; 25 km (16 mi) northwest of Turnu Serverin
179	15 July 1944	20:02	P-39	PQ 25 Ost 41644; 45 km (28 mi) north of Busk	225? (Note: This claim is not listed by Mathews and Foreman. Barbas labeled this claim as Batz's 225th aerial victory, the same number he assigned to his second aerial victory claimed on 26 October 1944.)	18 January 1945	—	Yak-3	
180	16 July 1944	13:25	LaGG	PQ 25 Ost 41375; PQ 41629; 55 km (34 mi) southwest of Lutsk	226? (Note: This claim is not listed by Mathews and Foreman. Barbas labeled this claim as Batz's 226th aerial victory, the same number he assigned to his aerial victory claimed on 29 October 1944.)	19 January 1945	—	Il-2	
181	16 July 1944	13:28	LaGG*	PQ 25 Ost 41688; 30 km (19 mi) northwest of Brody	227? (Note: This claim is not listed by Mathews and Foreman.)	21 January 1945	—	Yak-9	
– Stab II. Gruppe of Jagdgeschwader 52 –
228	13 March 1945	—	Il-2		233	16 March 1945	—	Il-2	
229	13 March 1945	—	Il-2		234	19 March 1945	—	Il-2	
230	14 March 1945	—	Il-2		235	19 March 1945	—	La-5	
231	14 March 1945	—	Il-2		236	5 April 1945	—	Il-2	
232	14 March 1945	—	Boston		237	16 April 1945	—	Il-2	
