= List of aerial victories claimed by Walter Schuck =

Walter Schuck (30 July 1920 – 27 March 2015) was a German military aviator who served in the Luftwaffe from 1937 until the end of World War II. As a fighter ace, he claimed 206 enemy aircraft shot down in over 500 combat missions, eight of which while flying the Messerschmitt Me 262 jet fighter. (Note: For a list of Luftwaffe Jet aces see List of German World War II jet aces)

== List of aerial victories claimed ==
According to US historian David T. Zabecki, Schuck was credited with 206 aerial victories. Spick also lists him with 206 aerial victories, 198 of which on the Eastern Front, and eight over the Western Allies flying the Me 262 jet fighter, including four our-engined heavy bombers. According to Dixon, Schuck flew approximately 500 combat missions. Mathews and Foreman, authors of Luftwaffe Aces — Biographies and Victory Claims, researched the German Federal Archives and found records for 181 aerial victory claims, plus nine further unconfirmed claims. This figure of confirmed claims includes 171 aerial victories on the Eastern Front and 10 on the Western Front, including four four-engined bombers and 8 victories with the Me 262 jet fighter.

Victory claims were logged to a map-reference (PQ = Planquadrat), for example "PQ 36 Ost 3087". The Luftwaffe grid map (Jägermeldenetz) covered all of Europe, western Russia and North Africa and was composed of rectangles measuring 15 minutes of latitude by 30 minutes of longitude, an area of about 360 square miles (930 km^{2}). These sectors were then subdivided into 36 smaller units to give a location area 3 km × 4 km (1.9 mi × 2.5 mi) in size.

♠ (Ace of spades) indicates those aerial victories which made Schuck an "ace-in-a-day", a term which designates a fighter pilot who has shot down five or more airplanes in a single day.
– (dash) indicates unconfirmed aerial victory claims for which Schuck did not receive credit.
! (exclamation mark) indicates those aerial victories listed by Mombeek, Prien, Stemmer, Rodeike and Bock.
# (hash mark) indicates those aerial victories listed by Mathews and Foreman.
? (question mark) indicates information discrepancies listed by Mombeek, Prien, Stemmer, Rodeike, Balke, Bock, Mathews and Foreman.

Claim!	Claim#	Date	Time	Type	Location	Claim!	Claim#	Date	Time	Type	Location
– 7. Staffel of Jagdgeschwader 5 –
1	1	15 May 1942	18:18	MiG-3		8	4	13 June 1942	17:02	Hurricane	
2	2	28 May 1942	16:36	Il-4		9	5	22 June 1942	22:25	I-180 (Yak-7)	
3	3	28 May 1942	16:40	Hurricane		10	6	22 June 1942	22:30	Hurricane	
4	—	5 June 1942	05:00	MiG-3? (Note: According to Mombeek claimed as an unknown fighter.)	southeast of Pechenga	11	7	28 June 1942	16:40	Hurricane	103992/42
5	—	5 June 1942	05:02	MiG-3	southeast of Pechenga	12	8	8 July 1942	14:05	P-40	104557/43
6	—	5 June 1942	05:05	MiG-3	east of Pechenga	13	9	20 July 1942	08:32	Pe-2	vicinity of the Liza Bight
7	—	5 June 1942	05:10	MiG-3	east of Pechenga						
– 9. Staffel of Jagdgeschwader 5 –
13	10	12 November 1942	12:10	P-40	PQ 36 Ost 3087	53	50	20 September 1943	15:24	Boston	PQ 27 Ost NT-3/9
14	11	26 December 1942	10:58	LaGG-3	vicinity of Murmashi	54	51	20 September 1943	15:26	P-39	
15	12	27 December 1942	10:45	P-40	vicinity of Murmashi	55	52	23 September 1943	13:02	P-40	PQ 36 Ost AG, southwest of Murmansk
16	13	31 December 1942	09:10	Pe-2		56	53	23 September 1943	13:07	P-40	PQ 36 Ost AG, southwest of Murmansk
17	14	31 December 1942	09:14	Pe-2		57	54	23 September 1943	13:08	P-39	PQ 36 Ost AG, southwest of Murmansk
18	15	31 December 1942	10:50	P-40		58	55	23 September 1943	13:10	P-40	PQ 36 Ost AG, southwest of Murmansk
19	16	10 January 1943	11:23	P-40	PQ 37 Ost 10552, vicinity of Kirkenes	59	56	24 September 1943	08:56	P-40	PQ 36 Ost AG, southwest of Murmansk
20	17	10 January 1943	11:28? (Note: According to Mombeek, Mathews and Foreman claimed at 11:30.)	Pe-2	PQ 37 Ost 2036, vicinity of Kirkenes	60	57	24 September 1943	08:58	P-40	PQ 36 Ost AG, southwest of Murmansk
21	18	24 January 1943	09:13? (Note: According to Mombeek, Mathews and Foreman claimed at 09:12.)	P-40	PQ 37 Ost 20123, Rybachy Peninsula	61	—	13 October 1943	12:53	Boston? (Note: According to Mombeek, Mathews and Foreman claimed as a Bell P-39 Airacobra.)	between Kiberg and Vadsø
22	19	24 January 1943	09:16	P-40	PQ 37 Ost 20192, Rybachy Peninsula	62	—	13 October 1943	— ? (Note: According to Mombeek, Mathews and Foreman claimed a 13:07.)	Boston	between Kiberg and Vadsø
23	20	26 February 1943	08:43	Pe-2	PQ 37 Ost 30723, Kola Bight	63? (Note: According to Mombeek, this aerial victory is unconfirmed, claimed at 13:07 as a Douglas A-20 Havoc, referred to as a Boston.)		13 October 1943	12:54?	P-40?	between Kiberg and Vadsø
24	21	28 February 1943	11:12	P-40	PQ 36 Ost 29131, vicinity of Pechenga	64	64	29 January 1944	12:08	Yak-7	east of Shonguy
25	22	2 March 1943	12:20? (Note: According to Mombeek, Mathews and Foreman claimed at 12:30 as an aircraft of unknown type.)	P-40?	PQ 36 Ost 29352	65	65	29 January 1944	12:25	Yak-7	southeast of Shonguy
26	23	14 March 1943	17:50	U-2	PQ 36 Ost 2927, on the Liza front	66♠	66	17 March 1944	10:55	Boston	PQ 37 Ost OC-9/7
27	24	19 March 1943	06:03	P-40	PQ 37 Ost 20841, Rybachy Peninsula	67♠	67	17 March 1944	11:00	Boston	PQ 37 Ost OC-9/7
28	25	19 March 1943	06:05	P-40	PQ 37 Ost 20843, Rybachy Peninsula	68♠	68	17 March 1944	11:03	Yak-7	PQ 37 Ost OC-9/5
29	26	25 March 1943	17:40	Il-2	PQ 36 Ost 29273, Murmansk	69♠	69	17 March 1944	11:07	Yak-7	PQ 37 Ost OD-8/4
30	27	25 March 1943	17:47	P-40	PQ 36 Ost 29291, Murmansk	70♠	70	17 March 1944	15:35	P-40	northwest of the Rybachy Peninsula
	—	25 March 1943	—	P-40	Murmashi airfield	71♠	71	17 March 1944	15:39	P-40	west of Eyna Guba
	—	25 March 1943	—	P-40	Murmashi airfield	72♠	72	17 March 1944	15:47	Il-2	
31	28	4 April 1943	13:27? (Note: According to Mombeek, Mathews and Foreman claimed at 13:25.)	P-40	PQ 37 Ost 10551, vicinity of Pechenga	73	73	23 March 1944	13:02	Yak-9	south of Liza Bight
32	29	4 April 1943	13:37? (Note: According to Mombeek, Mathews and Foreman claimed at 13:27.)	P-40	PQ 37 Ost 10761, vicinity of Pechenga	74	74	1 April 1944	13:07	P-40	PQ 37 Ost UE-1/3
33	30	14 April 1943	18:25	Hurricane	PQ 37 Ost 30753, vicinity of Vayenga	75	75	1 April 1944	13:10	P-40	PQ 37 Ost TF-7/7
34	31	14 April 1943	18:28? (Note: According to Mombeek, Mathews and Foreman claimed at 18:26.)	Hurricane	PQ 37 Ost 30752, vicinity of Vayenga	76	76	2 April 1944	16:38	Yak-9	PQ 36 Ost AE-3/1
35	32	7 May 1943	04:08? (Note: According to Mombeek, Mathews and Foreman claimed at 04:01.)	P-39	PQ 37 Ost 20793	77	77	2 April 1944	16:42	Yak-9	PQ 36 Ost AE-4/4
36? (Note: According to Prien, Stemmer, Rodeike and Bock, Schuck filed his 36th aerial victory over an aircraft of unknown type. This claim is not listed by Mombeek, Mathews and Foreman.)		7 May 1943	—	unknown	Motovsky Gulf	78	78	2 April 1944	16:45	Yak-9	PQ 36 Ost AD-3/6
36	33	22 May 1943	18:20? (Note: According to Mombeek, Mathews and Foreman claimed at 18:15.)	Hurricane	PQ 37 Ost 20474	79♠	79	7 April 1944	06:07	P-40	PQ 37 Ost QC-5/3; 10 km (6.2 mi) west of the northern tip of the Rybachy Peninsula
37	34	22 May 1943	18:25	P-39	PQ 37 Ost 20631	80♠	80	7 April 1944	06:11	P-40	PQ 37 Ost QC-7/2; 10 km (6.2 mi) west of the northern tip of the Rybachy Peninsula
38	35	22 May 1943	19:42	P-39	PQ 37 Ost 20492	81♠	81	7 April 1944	06:13	P-40	PQ 37 Ost RD-1/1; 10 km (6.2 mi) west of the northern tip of the Rybachy Peninsula
39	36	22 May 1943	19:50	P-39	PQ 37 Ost 20621	82♠	82	7 April 1944	06:14	Il-2	PQ 37 Ost RD-9/2
40	37	18 August 1943	16:16	Hurricane	east of Cape Korabelnyi east Cape Malzjj-Kerabelngjy	83♠	83	7 April 1944	10:18	P-39	PQ 37 Ost SF-8/6
41	38	18 August 1943	16:22	P-39	southwest of Zyp Nowolok (Note: Cape Zyp Nowolok is the easternmost point on the Rybachy Peninsula.)	84♠	84	7 April 1944	10:21	P-39	PQ 37 Ost SF-9/4
42	39	3 September 1943	19:11	Hurricane	PQ 36 Ost AE-8/8, Liza; 18 km (11 mi) west of Murmashi	85♠	85	25 May 1944	21:32	Boston	east of Oengang
43	40	3 September 1943	19:13	Hurricane	PQ 36 Ost AE-9/7, Liza; 18 km (11 mi) west of Murmashi	86♠	86	25 May 1944	21:35	P-40	east of Oengang
44	41	12 September 1943	14:25	P-40	PQ 36 Ost AF-9/6, Kola east	87♠	87	25 May 1944	21:38	Boston	northeast of Berlevåg
45	42	12 September 1943	14:26	P-40	PQ 36 Ost AF-7/4, Kola east	88♠	88	25 May 1944	21:40	P-40	northeast of Berlevåg
46	43	12 September 1943	17:02	P-40	PQ 36 Ost AF-4/1, Kola east	89♠	89	25 May 1944	21:43	Boston	northeast of Berlevåg
47	44	14 September 1943	18:22	P-39	PQ 37 Ost QC-8/5, Varangerfjord	90♠	90	25 May 1944	21:45	Boston	northeast of Berlevåg
48	45	14 September 1943	18:25	P-39	PQ 37 Ost QC-7/8, Varangerfjord	91	91	26 May 1944	04:56	Il-2	northeast of Vardø
49	46	14 September 1943	18:37	Il-2	PQ 37 Ost RC-8/1, Varangerfjord	92	92	26 May 1944	04:58	P-40	northeast of Vadsø
50	47	14 September 1943	18:39? (Note: According to Mombeek, Mathews and Foreman claimed at 18:40.)	P-39	PQ 37 Ost RC-8/1, Varangerfjord	93	93	26 May 1944	04:59	P-40	northeast of Vadsø
51	48	18 September 1943	13:04	P-40	PQ 36 Ost BC-2/4, Murmashi	—		26 May 1944	—	unknown	
	—	18 September 1943	—	P-40	Murmashi	94	94	26 May 1944	05:02	P-40	southeast of Vadsø
52	49	20 September 1943	15:21	Boston	PQ 27 Ost NT-3/1						
– Eismeerstaffel of Jagdgeschwader 5 –
95	95	12 June 1944	15:11	P-40	west of Zatorski Bay	120♠	120	28 June 1944	00:05	P-39	south of the King Oscar II Chapel
96♠	96	15 June 1944	02:31	P-40	Pechenga Bight	121♠	121	28 June 1944	00:07	P-39? (Note: According to Mombeek claimed as a Douglas A-20 Havoc "Boston".)	southeast of the King Oscar II Chapel
97♠	97	15 June 1944	02:33	P-40	vicinity of Hamningberg	122♠	122	28 June 1944	00:09	P-39	south of the King Oscar II Chapel
98♠	98	15 June 1944	19:11	P-40	north of the Pechenga Bight	123♠	123	28 June 1944	03:50	P-39	PQ 37 Ost SD-2/3
99♠	99	15 June 1944	19:13	P-40	northwest of the Pechenga Bight	124♠	124	28 June 1944	04:15	Yak-9	PQ 37 Ost RB-4/7, northwest of Pummanki
100♠	100	15 June 1944	19:14	P-40	west of Pummanki	125♠	125	28 June 1944	04:17	Yak-9	PQ 37 Ost RB-4/7, northwest of Pummanki
101♠	101	15 June 1944	19:15	P-40	southwest of Pummanki airfield	126	126	4 July 1944	19:00	Boston	PQ 37 Ost SA-6/3
—		15 June 1944	—	unknown		127	127	4 July 1944	19:02	Boston	PQ 37 Ost SB-1/7
102♠	102	17 June 1944	07:43	P-40	southeast of Vårdö	128	128	4 July 1944	19:03	P-39	PQ 37 Ost SB-2/3
103♠	103	17 June 1944	07:44	P-40	southeast of Vårdö	129♠	129	17 July 1944	19:06? (Note: According to Mombeek claimed at 19:05.)	Boston	PQ 37 Ost SB-1/4
104♠	104	17 June 1944	07:50	Il-2	southeast of Vårdö	130♠	130	17 July 1944	19:08	Boston	east of Kirkenes
105♠	105	17 June 1944	07:52	Il-2	southeast of Vårdö	131♠	131	17 July 1944	19:10	Boston	east of Kirkenes
106♠	106	17 June 1944	07:59	P-40	southeast of Kiberg	132♠	132	17 July 1944	19:13	P-39	west of Pechenga Bight
107♠	107	17 June 1944	08:02	Boston	southeast of Kiberg	133♠	133	17 July 1944	19:14	P-39	west of Pechenga Bight
108♠	108	17 June 1944	08:04	Boston	southeast of Vårdö	134♠	134	17 July 1944	19:19	P-39	northeast of Kolmajosjoki northeast of Pechenga Bight
109♠	109	17 June 1944	21:02	P-39	west of Kirkenes	135♠	135	17 July 1944	19:21	P-39	southwest of Pummanki
110♠	110	17 June 1944	21:04	Il-2	north of Kirkenes	136	136	21 July 1944	06:04	P-40	northeast of Havningsberg
111♠	111	17 June 1944	21:09	Il-2	southeast of Kirkenes	137♠	137	22 July 1944	12:16	P-39	east of Kirkenes
112♠	112	17 June 1944	21:12	Il-2	southeast of Kirkenes	138♠	138	22 July 1944	12:21	P-39	north of the King Oscar II Chapel
113	113	18 June 1944	05:10	Spitfire	northwest of Murmansk	139♠	139	22 July 1944	12:23	P-39	north of Pechenga Bight
114	114	24 June 1944	04:00? (Note: According to Mombeek claimed at 04:05.)	Yak-9	northwest of Ura-Guba	140♠	140	22 July 1944	12:24	P-39	northwest of Heinäsaari
115	115	27 June 1944	16:55	P-40	southwest of the King Oscar II Chapel northeast of Kirkenes	141♠	141	22 July 1944	12:32	P-39	southeast of Eyna Guba
116	116	27 June 1944	16:58	P-40	northeast of Kirkenes	142♠	142	22 July 1944	12:35	P-40	east of Eyna Guba
117	117	27 June 1944	17:00	P-39	northwest of the King Oscar II Chapel	143♠	143	22 July 1944	12:36	P-40	southeast of Rybachy Peninsula
118	118	27 June 1944	17:03	P-39	north of the King Oscar II Chapel	144	144	28 July 1944	12:50	P-39	south of Liza Bight
119♠	119	28 June 1944	00:02	P-39	northeast of Kirkenes	145	145	28 July 1944	12:52	P-39	south of Liza Bight
– 10. Staffel of Jagdgeschwader 5 –
146	146	17 August 1944	09:38	Yak-9	PQ 37 Ost SB-5/4	160	160	17 September 1944	17:33	Yak-9	vicinity of Kiberg
147	147	17 August 1944	09:55	P-39	PQ 37 Ost RB-7/3	161	161	17 September 1944	17:36	Yak-9	
148	148	17 August 1944	10:00	Boston	PQ 37 Ost RB-7/8	162	162	17 September 1944	17:41	Yak-9	vicinity of Waido
149	149	17 August 1944	10:03	P-39	PQ 37 Ost RB-6/9	163	163	17 September 1944	17:44	Yak-9	
150♠	150	23 August 1944	12:03	Yak-9	PQ 37 Ost RB	164	164	20 September 1944	15:31	Il-2	PQ 37 Ost SD-5/8
151♠	151	23 August 1944	12:58	P-39	PQ 37 Ost RD, north of Pechenga	165	165	20 September 1944	15:34	P-39	PQ 37 Ost SD-6/3
152♠	152	23 August 1944	13:01	P-39	PQ 37 Ost RD, north of Pechenga	166	166	25 September 1944	15:46	P-39	PQ 37 Ost TC-2/3
153♠	153	23 August 1944	13:03	P-39	PQ 37 Ost RD, north of Pechenga	167	167	25 September 1944	15:50	P-39	PQ 37 Ost TD-2/7
154♠	154	23 August 1944	16:44	P-39	PQ 37 Ost TD	168	168	25 September 1944	16:06	P-39	PQ 37 Ost RD-7/5, northeast of Kirkenes
155	155	15 September 1944	07:05	P-39	PQ 37 Ost RD-4/9	169	169	25 September 1944	16:10	Il-2	PQ 37 Ost RC-8/3
156	156	15 September 1944	07:20	P-39	PQ 37 Ost RD-8/1	170	170	27 September 1944	11:35	Boston	PQ 37 Ost QA-4/1
157	157	16 September 1944	12:06	Il-2	PQ 37 Ost SB-4/3	171	171	27 September 1944	11:43	Boston	PQ 37 Ost QB-3/5
158	158	16 September 1944	12:10	P-39	PQ 37 Ost SB-3/4	—	—	27 September 1944	11:45	Yak-9	
159	159	16 September 1944	16:28	P-39	PQ 37 Ost UB-3/3						
According to Schuck, aerial victories 172–196 were documented by the Kriegsmarine and later verified and confirmed by the Reichsluftfahrtministerium.
197	172	16 February 1945	16:00	P-51	vicinity of Ålesund	198	173	16 February 1945	16:10	P-51	vicinity of Ålesund
– 3. Staffel of Jagdgeschwader 7 "Nowotny" –
199	174	24 March 1945	12:00	P-51	vicinity of Neumünster	203	178	10 April 1945	14:30	B-17	vicinity of Oranienburg
200	175	24 March 1945	12:05	P-51	vicinity of Neumünster	204	179	10 April 1945	14:33	B-17	vicinity of Oranienburg
201	176	28 March 1945	—	P-51	vicinity of Braunschweig	205	180	10 April 1945	14:36	B-17	vicinity of Oranienburg
202	177	7 April 1945	12:15	P-38	vicinity of Seesen	206	181	10 April 1945	14:38	B-17	vicinity of Oranienburg
