= List of aerial victories claimed by Walter Wolfrum =

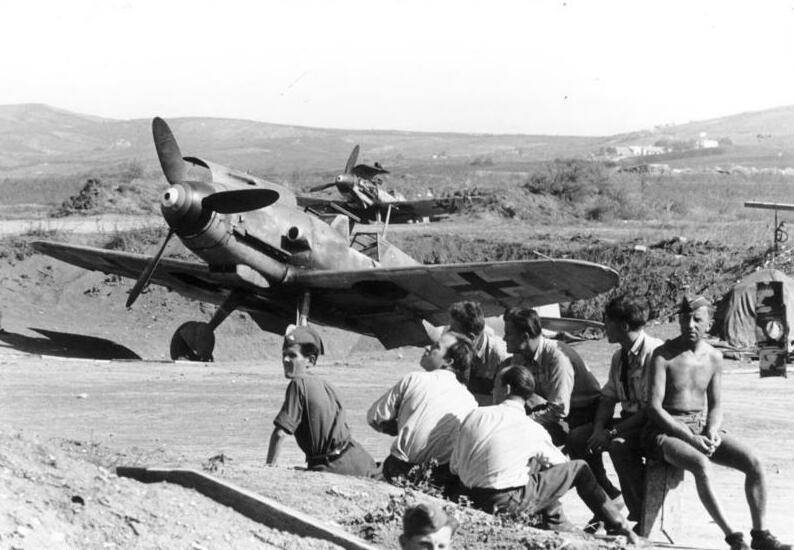
A Bf 109 of JG 52 similar to those flown by Wolfrum

Walter Wolfrum (23 May 1923 – 26 August 2010) was a German military aviator who served in the Luftwaffe during World War II. As a fighter ace, he flew 424 combat missions and claimed 137 aerial victories—that is, 137 aerial combat encounters resulting in the destruction of the enemy aircraft. This ties him for 43rd place among highest scoring fighter aces.

== List of aerial victories claimed ==
According to US historian David T. Zabecki, Wolfrum was credited with 137 aerial victories. Spick also lists him with 137 aerial victories claimed in 423 combat missions and a mission-to-claim ratio of 3.09. Obermaier lists him with 424 combat missions flown. Mathews and Foreman, authors of Luftwaffe Aces — Biographies and Victory Claims, researched the German Federal Archives and state that Wolfrum was credited with 134 aerial victories, plus sixteen further unconfirmed claims. All of his victories were claimed on the Eastern Front.

Victory claims were logged to a map-reference (PQ = Planquadrat), for example "PQ 34 Ost 76891". The Luftwaffe grid map (Jägermeldenetz) covered all of Europe, western Russia and North Africa and was composed of rectangles measuring 15 minutes of latitude by 30 minutes of longitude, an area of about 360 square miles (930 km^{2}). These sectors were then subdivided into 36 smaller units to give a location area 3 km × 4 km (1.9 mi × 2.5 mi) in size.

This and the ♠ (Ace of spades) indicates those aerial victories which made Wolfrum an "ace-in-a-day", a term which designates a fighter pilot who has shot down five or more airplanes in a single day.
This and the – (dash) indicates unconfirmed aerial victory claims for which Wolfrum did not receive credit.
This and the ? (question mark) indicates information discrepancies listed by Barbas, Prien, Stemmer, Rodeike, Balke, Bock, Mathews, Foreman and Wolfrum.

Claim	Date	Time	Type	Location	Claim	Date	Time	Type	Location	
– 5. Staffel of Jagdgeschwader 52 – Eastern Front — 4 February – 31 December 1943
1	28 May 1943	11:16	Yak-1	PQ 34 Ost 76891 vicinity of Kiyevskoye	11	9 September 1943	06:28	Yak-1	PQ 35 Ost 51872; 15 km (9.3 mi) south of Bohodukhiv	
2	21 July 1943	05:16	MiG-1	PQ 34 Ost 88432; 3 km (1.9 mi) southeast of Marienheim (Perekrestovo)	—	3 October 1943	11:00+	LaGG-3	vicinity of Usin	
3	22 July 1943	04:20	Il-2	PQ 34 Ost 88253 vicinity of Stepanovka	12	21 October 1943	09:50	Il-2 m.H. (Note: The "m.H." refers to an Ilyushin Il-2 with rear gunner (mit Heckschütze).)	PQ 35 Ost 10121; 10 km (6.2 mi) south of Pereiaslav	
4	24 July 1943	08:03? (Note: According to Mathews and Foreman claimed at 08:04.)	Yak-1	PQ 34 Ost 88432; 3 km (1.9 mi) southeast of Marienheim (Perekrestovo)	13	21 October 1943	14:45	La-5	PQ 35 Ost 11784, south of Jekrownik vicinity of Pereiaslav	
5	25 July 1943	11:20	Yak-1	PQ 34 Ost 88262 vicinity of Jalisawehino	14	22 October 1943	09:19	La-5	PQ 35 Ost 10134; 15 km (9.3 mi) southeast of Pereiaslav	
—	25 July 1943	11:30	Yak-1		15	22 October 1943	09:20	La-5	PQ 35 Ost 10133; 15 km (9.3 mi) southeast of Pereiaslav	
6	2 August 1943	11:44	Il-2 m.H.	PQ 34 Ost 88261, 3 km (1.9 mi) northeast of Marinowka vicinity of Jalisawehino	16	22 October 1943	09:30	Yak-1	PQ 35 Ost 10124; 10 km (6.2 mi) south of Pereiaslav	
7	8 August 1943	09:37	Yak-1	7 km (4.3 mi) east of Kiyevskoye vicinity of Moldawanskoje	17	3 November 1943? (Note: According to Barbas and Wolfrum's memoires claimed on 2 November 1943.)	14:32	Yak-1	PQ 35 Ost 01332	
8	24 August 1943	05:25	P-39	PQ 34 Ost 75494; Black Sea, 10 km (6.2 mi) southwest of Gelendzhik	18	6 November 1943	09:22	Yak-1	PQ 35 Ost 01564	
9	5 September 1943	13:40	Yak-9	PQ 35 Ost 60182; 15 km (9.3 mi) east of Merefa	19	6 December 1943	09:29	Il-2 m.H.	southeast of Eltigen	
10	6 September 1943	17:35	Yak-1	PQ 35 Ost 50262; 15 km (9.3 mi) northwest of Merefa	20	11 December 1943	12:11	P-39	east of Kerch	
– 5. Staffel of Jagdgeschwader 52 – Eastern Front — 1 January – 31 December 1944
21	7 February 1944	14:15	LaGG-3	PQ 34 Ost 66642 vicinity of Majak	46	22 March 1944	10:45	Yak-1	PQ 34 Ost 66642 vicinity of Bulganak east of Bulganak	
22	10 February 1944	11:54? (Note: According to Barbas claimed at 11:59.)	LaGG-3	PQ 34 Ost 66592 vicinity of Kamysh-Burun	47	22 March 1944	13:59	P-39	PQ 34 Ost 66642 vicinity of Majak	
23	12 February 1944	09:06	Yak-1	PQ 34 Ost 66642 vicinity of Majak	48	26 March 1944	09:16	Yak-7	PQ 34 Ost 47773 vicinity of Tachigary	
24	12 February 1944	14:19	Yak-1	PQ 34 Ost 66594, east of Kamysh-Burun	49	26 March 1944	14:02	Yak-9? (Note: According to Mathews and Foreman claimed as a Yakovlev Yak-7.)	PQ 34 Ost 47784; 40 km (25 mi) north of Dzhankoy	
25	13 February 1944	12:45	Yak-1	PQ 34 Ost 66613; Adshin Uschkaj	50	26 March 1944	15:47	Yak-1	PQ 34 Ost 47741; PQ 47771 south of Gromovka	
26	13 February 1944	13:03	Yak-1	PQ 34 Ost 66641 east-northeast of Bulganak	51	26 March 1944	16:06	Yak-1	PQ 34 Ost 47741; 30 km (19 mi) south of Dornburg	
27	14 February 1944	08:08? (Note: According to Mathews and Foreman claimed at 08:05.)	P-39	PQ 34 Ost 66641 vicinity of Bulganak east of Bulganak	52	1 April 1944	14:50	Yak-7	PQ 34 Ost 65163 over sea, southeast of Cape Takyl	
28	14 February 1944	08:13	P-40	PQ 34 Ost 66643 vicinity of Kerch	53	1 April 1944	14:57	Yak-7	PQ 34 Ost 66872 over sea, southeast of Cape Takyl	
—	14 February 1944	08:20	P-40		54	3 April 1944	10:01	Il-2 m.H.	PQ 34 Ost 56213; Sea of Azov	
29	14 February 1944	11:27	LaGG-3	PQ 34 Ost 66643 vicinity of Kerch	—	7 April 1944	08:00+	Yak-7	vicinity of Perekop	
—	14 February 1944	15:00+	Yak-1	vicinity of Kerch	55? (Note: According to Prien, Stemmer, Balke and Bock this claim was unconfirmed. However, Barbas and in Wolfrum's memoires, this claim was confirmed and is listed as his 55th aerial victory.)	7 April 1944	16:00+	Yak-7	vicinity of Perekop	
30	15 February 1944	06:57	P-39	PQ 34 Ost 66643; PQ 66811 vicinity of Taman	56	8 April 1944	12:31	Il-2 m.H.	PQ 34 Ost 46112; Grammatikowo	
—	26 February 1944	12:30	Yak-1	vicinity of Kerch	57	8 April 1944	16:29? (Note: According to Barbas, Mathews and Foreman claimed at 16:28.)	Il-2 m.H.	PQ 34 Ost 46112; Grammatikowo	
—	27 February 1944	16:00+	Yak-1	vicinity of Perekop	—	8 April 1944	16:30	Il-2 m.H.	vicinity of Perekop	
31	28 February 1944	14:20? (Note: According to Mathews and Foreman claimed at 14:26.)	LaGG-3	PQ 34 Ost 66564 vicinity of Kerch	—	8 April 1944	16:30	Il-2 m.H.	vicinity of Perekop	
32	2 March 1944	10:26	LaGG-3	PQ 34 Ost 66811 vicinity of Taman	58	9 April 1944	07:02	Yak-7	PQ 34 Ost 37833, 3 km (1.9 mi) southwest of Karankij vicinity of An-Najman	
33	2 March 1944	10:33	LaGG-3	PQ 34 Ost 66732 vicinity of Tobetschik	59	9 April 1944	07:23	Yak-7	PQ 34 Ost 47774, 2 km (1.2 mi) east-northeast of Karankij vicinity of Tachigary	
34	11 March 1944	12:13	Yak-7	PQ 34 Ost 66533; PQ 66643 vicinity of Kerch	60	9 April 1944	14:12	Yak-7	PQ 34 Ost 46152 west of Mikhaylovka	
35	11 March 1944	12:25	P-39	PQ 34 Ost 66572 vicinity of Apassnaja	61	9 April 1944	16:40	Yak-7	PQ 34 Ost 46112; Grammatikowo	
—	13 March 1944	13:30	P-39	vicinity of Kerch	—	10 April 1944	13:00+	Yak-7	vicinity of Perekop	
36	14 March 1944	07:27? (Note: According to Barbas, Mathews and Foreman claimed at 07:29.)	Yak-1	PQ 34 Ost 47731; 25 km (16 mi) west of Gelendzhik	62	10 April 1944	17:50	Yak-7	PQ 34 Ost 46114 east of Tomoschewka	
37	16 March 1944	15:31	Yak-1	PQ 34 Ost 37694; 35 km (22 mi) west-northwest of Akkerman	63	11 April 1944	10:56	Il-2 m.H.	PQ 34 Ost 46324 vicinity of Dzhankoy	
38	17 March 1944	06:09	Yak-7	PQ 34 Ost 47772 vicinity of Karankut	64	11 April 1944	15:02	Yak-7	PQ 34 Ost 46172; PQ 46127; 25 km (16 mi) west-northwest of Dzhankoy	
39♠	19 March 1944	07:28? (Note: According to Barbas claimed at 07:25.)	LaGG-3	PQ 34 Ost 66812 vicinity of Taman	65	12 April 1944	16:36	Yak-7	PQ 34 Ost 46514; 25 km (16 mi) southeast of Tokultschak	
40♠	19 March 1944	07:31	LaGG-3	PQ 34 Ost 66674, northeast of Kossa Tulsa vicinity of Kossa Tulsa	66	12 April 1944	16:38	Yak-7	PQ 34 Ost 46574; PQ 46514; 25 km (16 mi) southeast of Tokultschak	
41♠	19 March 1944	10:58	Boston	PQ 34 Ost 26281; 20 km (12 mi) east-northeast of Novyi Buh	67	13 April 1944	11:08	Yak-7	PQ 34 Ost 46742; 15 km (9.3 mi) southeast of Karankut	
42♠	19 March 1944	14:50	Il-2 m.H.	PQ 34 Ost 26833; 20 km (12 mi) northeast of Yartsevo	68	14 April 1944	15:57	Yak-7	PQ 34 Ost 35422; 20 km (12 mi) northeast of Sevastopol	
43♠	19 March 1944	14:54	Il-2 m.H.	PQ 34 Ost 36712; Black Sea, 20 km (12 mi) west of Yevpatoria	69	15 April 1944	06:40	Il-2 m.H.	PQ 34 Ost 35472 vicinity of Balaklawa; 10 km (6.2 mi) south of Sevastopol	
44♠	19 March 1944	14:58	Il-2 m.H.	PQ 34 Ost 36572; 30 km (19 mi) southeast of Ak-Mechet	70	15 April 1944	06:41	Il-2 m.H.? (Note: According to Prien, Stemmer, Balke and Bock claimed as a Lavochkin-Gorbunov-Gudkov LaGG-3. In Wolfrum's memoires, this claim is listed as an Ilyushin Il-2.)	PQ 34 Ost 35611; Black Sea, 10 km (6.2 mi) south of Sevastopol	
45	22 March 1944	10:39	Yak-1	PQ 34 Ost 66641 vicinity of Bulganak east of Bulganak						
– 1. Staffel of Jagdgeschwader 52 – Eastern Front — 16 May – 16 July 1944
71	16 May 1944	18:10	Yak-9	PQ 24 Ost 98785; 15 km (9.3 mi) south of Grigoriopol	100	1 June 1944	11:47	Yak-9	PQ 24 Ost 78824; 10 km (6.2 mi) south of Iași	
72? (Note: According to Prien, Stemmer, Balke and Bock this claim was unconfirmed. However, Barbas and in Wolfrum's memoires, this claim was confirmed and is listed as his 72nd aerial victory.)	16 May 1944	~18:00	Il-2 m.H.		101	1 June 1944	14:14	P-39? (Note: According to Barbas, Mathews and Foreman claimed as a Yakovlev Yak-9.)	PQ 24 Ost 78654; 15 km (9.3 mi) southeast of Țuțora	
73	17 May 1944	13:18? (Note: According to Mathews and Foreman claimed at 13:13.)	Yak-9	PQ 24 Ost 97123; 15 km (9.3 mi) south of Grigoriopol	102	1 June 1944	15:20? (Note: According to Barbas, Mathews and Foreman claimed at 14:20.)	P-39	PQ 24 Ost 78654; 15 km (9.3 mi) southeast of Țuțora	
74	17 May 1944	18:30	Yak-9	PQ 24 Ost 98788; 15 km (9.3 mi) south of Grigoriopol	— (Note: This unconfirmed claim is not listed by Barbas nor by Prien, Stemmer, Balke and Bock.)	1 June 1944	—	P-39		
75♠	20 May 1944	14:47	Yak-1	PQ 24 Ost 98722 vicinity of Grigoriopol	103	4 June 1944	15:07	P-39	PQ 24 Ost 78622, north of Soltozia; PQ 78671; 15 km (9.3 mi) north of Iași	
76♠	20 May 1944	14:50	Yak-1	PQ 24 Ost 98724 vicinity of Grigoriopol	104	4 June 1944	16:35	P-39	PQ 24 Ost 78592; 15 km (9.3 mi) northwest of Iași	
77♠	20 May 1944	14:52	Yak-9	PQ 24 Ost 98727 vicinity of Grigoriopol	105? (Note: According to Prien, Stemmer, Balke and Bock this claim is unconfirmed.)	6 June 1944	16:14	P-39	PQ 78644; 10 km (6.2 mi) south of Țuțora	
78♠	20 May 1944	16:55	Yak-9	PQ 24 Ost 98757; 5 km (3.1 mi) south of Grigoriopol	106	7 July 1944	10:14	Yak-9	PQ 25 Ost 42694; 15 km (9.3 mi) northeast of Kovel	
79♠	20 May 1944	17:16? (Note: According to Mathews and Foreman claimed at 17:14.)	La-5	PQ 24 Ost 98752; 5 km (3.1 mi) south of Grigoriopol	107	7 July 1944	16:50	Yak-9	PQ 25 Ost 42687; 10 km (6.2 mi) north of Kovel	
80? (Note: According to Prien, Stemmer, Balke and Bock this claim was unconfirmed. However, Barbas and in Wolfrum's memoires, this claim was confirmed and is listed as his 80th aerial victory.)	20 May 1944	~17:00	LaGG-3? (Note: According to Barbas and in Wolfrum's memoires, claimed as a Yakovlev Yak-9.)		108	7 July 1944	16:54	Yak-9	PQ 25 Ost 42812; 20 km (12 mi) south-southwest of Kovel	
81	22 May 1944	10:37	La-5	PQ 24 Ost 98725 vicinity of Grigoriopol	109	7 July 1944	16:55	Yak-9	PQ 25 Ost 42813; PQ 50598; 25 km (16 mi) south-southwest of Ternopil	
82♠	30 May 1944	04:20? (Note: According to Barbas, Mathews and Foreman claimed at 04:29.)	La-5	PQ 24 Ost 78811; 40 km (25 mi) west of Țuțora	110	14 July 1944	09:34	P-39	PQ 25 Ost 41622; 55 km (34 mi) southwest of Lutsk	
83♠	30 May 1944	06:30	P-39	PQ 24 Ost 78678; 15 km (9.3 mi) north of Iași	111	14 July 1944	14:37	Yak-9	PQ 25 Ost 50393; 10 km (6.2 mi) west of Ternopil	
84♠	30 May 1944	09:33	P-39	PQ 24 Ost 78685; 20 km (12 mi) northeast of Iași	112	14 July 1944	17:29	Yak-9? (Note: According to Barbas, Mathews and Foreman claimed as a Lavochkin La-5.)	La-5	PQ 25 Ost 50474 vicinity of Ternopil
85♠	30 May 1944	09:47	P-39	PQ 24 Ost 78656; 15 km (9.3 mi) southeast of Țuțora	113	15 July 1944	10:53	Il-2 m.H.	PQ 25 Ost 41624; 55 km (34 mi) southwest of Lutsk	
86♠	30 May 1944	11:17? (Note: According to Barbas, Mathews and Foreman claimed at 11:37.)	P-39	PQ 24 Ost 78684; PQ 78645; 10 km (6.2 mi) south of Țuțora	114	15 July 1944	16:55	P-39	PQ 25 Ost 41643; 45 km (28 mi) north of Busk	
87♠	30 May 1944	14:09	P-39	PQ 24 Ost 78684; PQ 78679; 15 km (9.3 mi) north of Iași	115	15 July 1944	17:02	P-39	PQ 25 Ost 41627; 55 km (34 mi) southwest of Lutsk	
88♠	30 May 1944	14:13	P-39	PQ 24 Ost 78823; PQ 78813; 10 km (6.2 mi) south of Iași	116	15 July 1944	17:14	Yak-9	PQ 25 Ost 41447; PQ 41645; 25 km (16 mi) southeast of Włodzimierz	
89♠	30 May 1944	14:20	P-39	PQ 24 Ost 78813; PQ 78683; 20 km (12 mi) northeast of Iași	117♠	16 July 1944	07:09	Yak-9	PQ 25 Ost 41642; 45 km (28 mi) north of Busk	
90♠	30 May 1944	16:07	Yak-9	PQ 24 Ost 78676; 15 km (9.3 mi) north of Iași	118♠	16 July 1944	07:14	Yak-9	PQ 25 Ost 41645; 45 km (28 mi) north of Busk	
91♠	30 May 1944	16:20	P-39	PQ 24 Ost 78824; 10 km (6.2 mi) south of Iași	119♠	16 July 1944	09:07	Yak-9	PQ 25 Ost 50513; PQ 50315; 20 km (12 mi) north of Ternopil	
92♠	30 May 1944	18:07	P-39	PQ 24 Ost 78643; 10 km (6.2 mi) south of Țuțora	120♠	16 July 1944	09:15	Yak-9	PQ 25 Ost 50176; 15 km (9.3 mi) east of Zolochiv	
93♠	31 May 1944	12:59	P-39	PQ 24 Ost 78649; 10 km (6.2 mi) south of Țuțora	121♠	16 July 1944	12:15	La-5	PQ 25 Ost 50362; 25 km (16 mi) east-northeast of Ternopil	
94♠	31 May 1944	13:18	P-39	PQ 24 Ost 78648; 10 km (6.2 mi) south of Țuțora	122♠	16 July 1944	12:25	La-5	PQ 25 Ost 50369; 25 km (16 mi) east-northeast of Ternopil	
95♠	31 May 1944	13:26	P-39	PQ 24 Ost 78647; 10 km (6.2 mi) south of Țuțora	123♠	16 July 1944	12:27	La-5	PQ 25 Ost 50368; 25 km (16 mi) east-northeast of Ternopil	
96♠	31 May 1944	16:12	P-39	PQ 24 Ost 78633; PQ 78533; 15 km (9.3 mi) west of Țuțora	124♠	16 July 1944	12:30	La-5	PQ 25 Ost 50368; 25 km (16 mi) east-northeast of Ternopil	
97♠	31 May 1944	18:53	P-39	PQ 24 Ost 78843, northwest of Iași; PQ 78643; 10 km (6.2 mi) south of Țuțora	125♠	16 July 1944	15:40	Yak-9	PQ 25 Ost 50173; 15 km (9.3 mi) east of Zolochiv	
98♠	31 May 1944	19:07	P-39	PQ 24 Ost 78617; PQ 78117; 40 km (25 mi) northeast of Botoșani	126♠	16 July 1944	15:52	P-39	PQ 25 Ost 40282 east of Zolochiv; 10 km (6.2 mi) west of Zolochiv	
99	1 June 1944	11:43	Yak-9? (Note: According to Mathews and Foreman claimed as a Lavochkin-Gorbunov-Gudkov aircraft.)	PQ 24 Ost 78687; 20 km (12 mi) northeast of Iași						
– 1. Staffel of Jagdgeschwader 52 – Eastern Front — 1 February – 8 May 1944
127	10 February 1945	16:00~	Yak-9		132	15 March 1945	17:00~	P-39	vicinity of Weidengut	
128	5 March 1945	14:00~	Yak-9	vicinity of Weidengut	133	15 March 1945	17:00~	P-39	vicinity of Weidengut	
129	7 March 1945	13:00~	Pe-2	vicinity of Breslau-Brieg vicinity of Weidengut	134	16 April 1945	11:10~	P-39	vicinity of Weidengut	
—	11 March 1945	16:15~	Yak-9	vicinity of Weidengut	135	16 April 1945	11:10~	P-39	vicinity of Weidengut	
130	15 March 1945	14:10~	Il-2	vicinity of Weidengut	136	17 April 1945	10:15~	Yak-9	vicinity of Görlitz	
131	15 March 1945	17:00~	P-39	vicinity of Weidengut	137	17 April 1945	13:10~	Yak-9	vicinity of Görlitz	
