= List of aerial victories claimed by Adolf Galland =

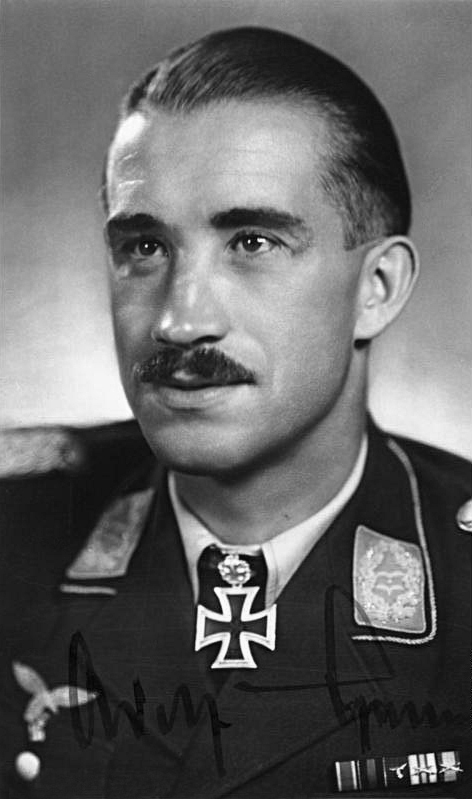
Galland as Oberstleutnant

Adolf Josef Ferdinand Galland (19 March 1912 – 9 February 1996) was a German Luftwaffe general and flying ace who served throughout the Second World War in Europe. He flew 705 combat missions and fought on the Western Front and in the Defence of the Reich. On four occasions, he survived being shot down, and he was credited with 104 aerial victories, all of them against the Western Allies.

== List of aerial victories claimed ==
According to US historian David T. Zabecki, Galland was credited with 104 aerial victories. Mathews and Foreman, authors of Luftwaffe Aces – Biographies and Victory Claims, researched the German Federal Archives and found records for 100 aerial victory claims, plus nine further unconfirmed claims, all of which claimed on the Western Front. This figure of confirmed claims includes two four-engined bombers and six victories with the Me 262 jet fighter.

This and the – (dash) indicates unconfirmed aerial victory claims for which Galland did not receive credit.
This and the ? (question mark) indicates information discrepancies listed by Prien, Stemmer, Rodeike, Bock, Mathews and Foreman.

Claim	Date	Time	Type	Location	Claim	Date	Time	Type	Location
– Stab of Jagdgeschwader 27 – Battle of France — 10 May – 25 June 1940
1	12 May 1940	10:10	Hurricane	10 km (6.2 mi) west of Liège	— (Note: Prien, Stemmer, Rodeike and Bock consider this claim confirmed. Mathews and Foreman list this claim as unconfirmed.)	20 May 1940	20:50	Potez 63	south of Amiens
2	12 May 1940	10:20	Hurricane	18 km (11 mi) south of Liège	7	29 May 1940	12:59	Blenheim	15 km (9.3 mi) north of Gravelines
3	12 May 1940	15:50	Hurricane	7 km (4.3 mi) east-northeast of Tirlemont	8	29 May 1940	13:04	Blenheim	30 km (19 mi) northwest of Gravelines
4	16 May 1940	19:30	Spitfire	Seclin, 5 km (3.1 mi) south of Lille	9	2 June 1940	09:28	Spitfire	west of Dunkirk
5	19 May 1940	20:50	Potez 63	north of Albert-Méaulte	10	9 June 1940	15:55	Curtiss	east of Rotoy
6	19 May 1940	21:45	Potez 63	southwest of Hirson	11	9 June 1940	16:10	Morane MS 406	13 km (8.1 mi) northwest of Meaux
– Stab III. Gruppe of Jagdgeschwader 26 – Battle of France – 10 May – 25 June 1940
12	14 June 1940	17:15	Blenheim	22 km (14 mi) southeast of Vernon	13	14 June 1940	17:28	Defiant	10 km (6.2 mi) south of Évreux
– Stab III. Gruppe of Jagdgeschwader 26 – At the Channel and over England – 26 June 1940 – 21 June 1941
14	24 July 1940	13:35	Spitfire	30 km (19 mi) northeast of Margate	18	14 August 1940	13:30	Hurricane	southwest of Dover
15	25 July 1940	16:17	Spitfire	Dover Harbour	19	15 August 1940	12:55	Spitfire	10 km (6.2 mi) east of Dover; Dover/Folkestone
16? (Note: Prien, Stemmer, Rodeike and Bock consider this claim as unconfirmed. Mathews and Foreman list this claim as unconfirmed.)	28 July 1940	15:14	Spitfire	north-northeast of Dover	20	15 August 1940	16:01? (Note: According to Mathews and Foreman claimed at 16:00.)	Spitfire	15 km (9.3 mi) southeast of Folkestone
17	12 August 1940	12:41? (Note: According to Mathews and Foreman claimed at 12:30.)	Hurricane	north-northwest of Margate	21	15 August 1940	16:07	Spitfire	20 km (12 mi) southeast of Dover
– Stab of Jagdgeschwader 26 "Schlageter" – At the Channel and over England – 26 June 1940 – 21 June 1941
22	25 August 1940	19:50	Spitfire	Dungeness/Folkestone	47	30 October 1940	12:55	Spitfire	east of London
23	28 August 1940	10:08	Defiant	Faversham east of Canterbury	48	30 October 1940	17:30	Spitfire	south of Eastchurch/Maidstone
24	31 August 1940	09:42	Curtiss	20 km (12 mi) southeast of Cambridge	49	30 October 1940	17:40	Spitfire	Canterbury/Maidstone
25	31 August 1940	18:50	Spitfire	Gravesend	50	1 November 1940	12:50	Spitfire	west of Ashford
26	31 August 1940	19:03	Hurricane	Maidstone	51	14 November 1940	15:28	Spitfire	10 km (6.2 mi) south of Dover
27	1 September 1940	14:55? (Note: According to Mathews and Foreman claimed at 19:55.)	Spitfire	southeastern edge of London	52	15 November 1940	14:15? (Note: According to Mathews and Foreman claimed at 10:28.)	Hurricane	Dover
28	3 September 1940	11:32	Hurricane	Chelmsford	53	17 November 1940	10:20	Hurricane	west of Harwich; 20 km (12 mi) east of sunk lightship
29	6 September 1940	10:20	Hurricane	Tonbridge	54	17 November 1940	10:27	Hurricane	Thames Estuary
30	11 September 1940	16:20	Hurricane	northwest of Dungeness	55?	27 November 1940	17:00	Spitfire	5 km (3.1 mi) east of Detling
31	14 September 1940	17:03	Hurricane	southeastern edge of London	56	28 November 1940	15:40	Hurricane	Dartford
32	15 September 1940	15:30? (Note: According to Mathews and Foreman claimed at 16:50.)	Hurricane	Thames Estuary	57	5 December 1940	12:30? (Note: According to Mathews and Foreman claimed at 16:40.)	Spitfire	Dover/Dungeness
33	18 September 1940	13:35	Hurricane		58	4 April 1941	17:50	Spitfire	Dover/Canterbury
34	18 September 1940	13:52	Hurricane	west of Rochester	59	15 April 1941	17:50	Spitfire	Wittering; 30 km (19 mi) west of Dover
35	18 September 1940	13:55	Hurricane	west of Rochester	60	15 April 1941	18:00	Spitfire	Dover/Margate; 3 km (1.9 mi) north of Margate
36	20 September 1940	12:05	Spitfire	south of Hornchurch	—	15 April 1941	18:00	Spitfire	Dover vicinity of Margate
37	21 September 1940	19:25	Spitfire	west of Ashford/Canterbury	61	13 June 1941	13:15	Hurricane	5 km (3.1 mi) west of Dover
38	23 September 1940	10:45	Hurricane	north of Rochester	62	13 June 1941	13:18	Hurricane	10 km (6.2 mi) northeast of Ashford; 10 km (6.2 mi) northeast of Dover
39	23 September 1940	10:45	Hurricane	north of Rochester	63	16 June 1941	16:35	Hurricane	west of Boulogne
40	24 September 1940	10:00	Hurricane	Rochester	64	17 June 1941	19:38	Hurricane	15 km (9.3 mi) west of Saint-Omer
41	30 September 1940	18:05	Hurricane	south of Guildford	65	17 June 1941	19:40	Hurricane	5 km (3.1 mi) southeast of Boulogne
42	10 October 1940	10:20	Spitfire	south of Eastchurch	66	18 June 1941	18:18	Spitfire	1 km (0.62 mi) east of Ardres
43	11 October 1940	17:05	Spitfire	southeast of Chatham; Dartford	67	21 June 1941	12:32	Blenheim	south of Saint-Omer
44	11 October 1940	17:12	Hurricane	Dartford/Rochester	68?	21 June 1941	12:36	Blenheim	Merville north of Saint-Omer
45	15 October 1940	13:50	Spitfire	south of Rochester	69	21 June 1941	16:37	Spitfire	north of Etaples
46	26 October 1940	17:30	Hurricane	Maidstone/south of London					
– Stab of Jagdgeschwader 26 "Schlageter" – On the Western Front – 22 June 1941 – 31 December 1941
70	2 July 1941	12:30	Blenheim	Merville	83	7 September 1941	17:19	Spitfire	20 km (12 mi) west of Boulogne
71?	23 July 1941	13:35	Spitfire	40 km (25 mi) northwest of Gravelines	—	20 September 1941	16:45	Spitfire	Bergues/Bourbourg
72	23 July 1941	20:10	Spitfire	Fruges	—	20 September 1941	16:55	Spitfire	6 km (3.7 mi) northwest of Braye-Dunes
73	23 July 1941	20:15	Spitfire	Fruges	84	21 September 1941	16:23	Spitfire	Etaples/Montreuil
74	7 August 1941	11:23	Spitfire	Lumbres, southwest of Saint-Omer	85	21 September 1941	17:35	Spitfire	south of Dunkirk
75	7 August 1941	17:40	Spitfire	10 km (6.2 mi) northwest of Saint-Omer	86	13 October 1941	14:17	Spitfire	Saint-Omer
— (Note: This claim is not listed by Mathews and Foreman.)	7 August 1941	17:44	Spitfire	north of Ardres	87	13 October 1941	14:27	Blenheim	Samer
76	9 August 1941	11:32	Spitfire	northwest of Saint-Pol-sur-Mer	88	21 October 1941	12:54	Spitfire	west of Samer
77?	9 August 1941	17:44	Spitfire	Gravelines north of Ardres	89	21 October 1941	12:58	Spitfire	6 km (3.7 mi) west of Hardelot
78	12 August 1941	13:12	Spitfire	20–25 km (12–16 mi) west of Vlissingen	90	21 October 1941	18:16	Spitfire	15 km (9.3 mi) west of Boulogne
79	12 August 1941	13:18	Blenheim	west of Haamstede	91	27 October 1941	13:25	Spitfire	south of Dunkirk
—	19 August 1941	11:55	Spitfire	Bergues	92	8 November 1941	12:58	Spitfire	Montreuil
80	19 August 1941	19:32	Spitfire	northwest of Saint-Omer	93	8 November 1941	13:00	Spitfire	10 km (6.2 mi) south of Hazebrouck
81	19 August 1941	19:45	Hurricane	southeast of Gravelines	94	18 November 1941	12:32	Spitfire	20 km (12 mi) west of Boulogne
82	4 September 1941	17:30	Blenheim	north of Saint-Omer					
– Stab of General der Jagdflieger –
—	9 October 1943	—	B-17	vicinity of Marienburg	—	8 March 1944	—	B-17	
—	8 March 1944	—	B-17						
– Jagdverband 44 –
95	3 April 1945	—	P-38		99	21 April 1945	—	B-17	vicinity of Munich
96	5 April 1945	—	B-24		100	26 April 1945	11:50+	B-26	vicinity of Neuburg
97	16 April 1945	—	B-26	vicinity of Lanberg	—	26 April 1945	11:55~	B-26	vicinity of Neuburg
98	16 April 1945	—	B-26	vicinity of Lanberg					
