= List of World War II aces from Germany: G–L =

This is a list of fighter aces in World War II from Germany with their surname starting from G to L. A flying ace or fighter ace is a military aviator credited with shooting down five or more enemy aircraft during aerial combat. Aces are listed alphabetically by last name.

== Aces ==
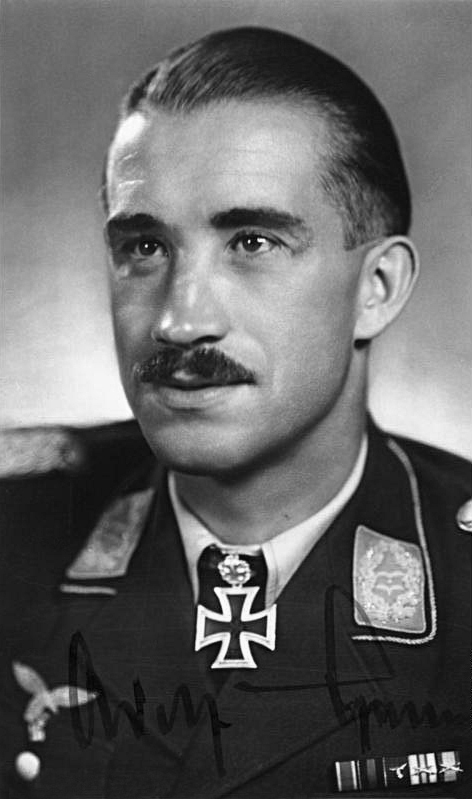
Adolf Galland, the last pilot to claim 100 aerial victories

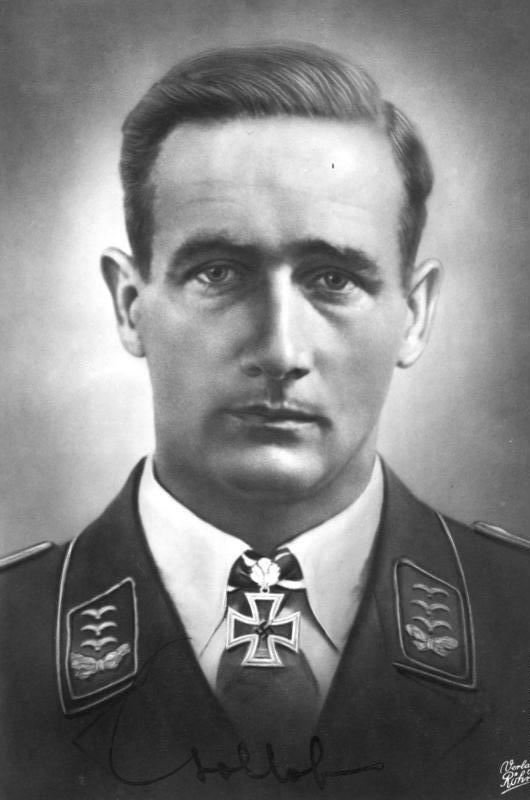
Gordon Gollob, the first pilot to claim 150 aerial victories

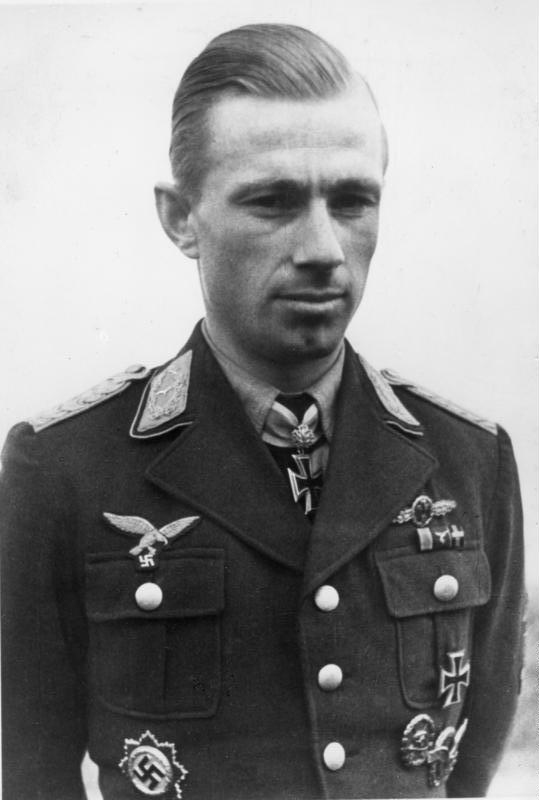
Helmut Lent, the first night fighter pilot to claim 100 aerial victories

By surname: A–F • M–P • Q–S • T–Z

This along with the * (asterisk), indicates that the pilot was either killed in action (KIA), missing in action (MIA), died of wounds (DOW), killed in a flying accident (KIFA), or killed in a car accident (KICA).
This and the / (slash) indicates information discrepancies listed by Aders, Boiten, Caldwell, Girbig, Held, Obermaier, Spick, Ring, Mathews, Foreman and Zabecki.

=== G ===
Name	Rank	Claims	Unit	Notes
Josef Gabl	Oberfeldwebel	42/28+	JG 51	
Kurt Gabler	Oberleutnant	16	JG 300	
Alfred Gädicke*	Feldwebel	5	JG 52, JG 11	KIA 10 February 1944
Andreas Gail*	Gefreiter	9	JG 51	KIA 13 July 1943
Otto Gaiser*	Leutnant	74	JG 51	Knight's Cross; MIA 22 January 1944
"Dolfo" Adolf Galland	Generalleutnant	104/101	JG 27, JG 26, JV 44	Knight's Cross with Oak Leaves, Swords and Diamonds
Paul Galland*	Leutnant	17	JG 26	
Wilhelm-Ferdinand (Wutz) Galland*	Major	54/56	JG 26	Knight's Cross
Bernd Gallowitsch	Major	64	JG 51, JG 7	Knight's Cross
Fritz Gammel*	Oberfeldwebel	19	JG 53	MIA 4 September 1942
Josef Gärtner	Oberfeldwebel	6	JG 26	
Wilhelm Gäth	Major	9	JG 26	
Werner Gayko	Oberleutnant	14	JG 5	
August Geiger*	Hauptmann	53/50	NJG 1	Knight's Cross with Oak Leaves; KIA 29/30 September 1943
Friedrich Geisshardt*	Hauptmann	102/93	LG 2, JG 77, JG 26, JG 27	Knight's Cross with Oak Leaves; KIA 6 April 1942
Wolfgang Gendelmeyer*	Leutnant	8	JG 3	KIA 1 August 1942
Hannes Gentzen	Major	18	JG 102	
Dieter Gerhard	Oberleutnant	5	JG 1	
Günther Gerhards	Leutnant	8	JG 52	
Werner Gerhardt*	Oberfeldwebel	13/12	JG 2, JG 1, JG 26	KIA 19 August 1942
Erich Gerlitz*	Major	18	JG 51, JG 27, JG 53, JG 5	KIA 16 March 1944
Lorenz Gerstmayr	Oberfeldwebel	15	NJG 3	Admitted to Luftwaffe hospital in Amsterdam on 7 July 1944, died 29 May 1945
Werner Gerth*	Hauptmann	38/23	JG 3, JG 300, JG 400	Knight's Cross; KIA 2 November 1944
Herbert Giesecke	Oberfeldwebel	6	NJG 3	
Vinzenz Giessübel	Oberfeldwebel	6	NJG 1, NJG 2	
Paul Gildner*	Oberleutnant	48/43	ZG 1, NJG 1, NJG 2	Knight's Cross with Oak Leaves; KIFA 24/25 February 1943
Gerhard Gleuwitz	Oberleutnant	11+	JG 52	
Rudolf Glöckner	Oberleutnant	33	JG 5, JG 7	German Cross
Adolf Glunz	Oberleutnant	71/69	JG 52, JG 26, JG 7	Knight's Cross with Oak Leaves
Heinz Golinski*	Feldwebel	47	JG 53	Knight's Cross; KIA 16 October 1942
Erich Gollasch*	Oberleutnant	7	NJG 2, NJG 1, NJG 5, NJG 100	MIA 25/26 September 1943
Gordon Gollob	Oberst	150/146	JG 3, JG 77	Knight's Cross with Oak Leaves, Swords and Diamonds
Kurt Goltzsch*	Oberleutnant	43	JG 2	Knight's Cross
Heinz Gomann	Feldwebel	12	JG 26, JG 7	
Heinz Gossow	Oberfeldwebel	12/6	KG 3, JG 300, JG 301, JG 7	Knight's Cross
Heinz Gottlob	Oberleutnant	6	JG 26	
Franz Götz	Major	63	JG 53, JG 26	Knight's Cross
Hans Götz*	Hauptmann	82	JG 54	Knight's Cross
Walter Grabmann	Generalmajor	13 (incl. 7 in Spain)	LG 1, ZG 76	Knight's Cross
Friedrich (Fritz) Graeff	Oberleutnant	6	ZG 26, NJG 1, NJG 4	WIA 8/9 July 1943
Hermann Graf	Oberst	212/206	JG 52, JG 11	Knight's Cross with Oak Leaves, Swords and Diamonds
Hartmann Grasser	Major	103/96+	JG 51	Knight's Cross with Oak Leaves
Berthold Graßmuck*	Oberfeldwebel	65	JG 52	Knight's Cross
Karl Gratz	Leutnant	138	JG 52, JG 2	Knight's Cross
Hans Gref*	Oberleutnant	16	ZG 76, NJG 3, NJG 5, NJG 100, NJGr 10	KIA 26 March 1944
Hermann Greiner	Hauptmann	51/50	NJG 2, NJG 1, NJSch 1	Knight's Cross with Oak Leaves
Karl-Heinz Greisert*	Major	34	JG 2, JG 3	KIA 22 July 1942
Heinrich Griese	Major	13	NJG 1, NJG 4, NJG 6	WIA 12/13 September 1944
Heinz Grimm*	Leutnant	27/26	NJG 1	Knight's Cross; DOW 13 October 1943
Josef Grimm	Unteroffizier	5	JG 27	
Alfred Grislawski	Hauptmann	133/127	JG 52, JG 1	Knight's Cross with Oak Leaves
Helmut Grollmus*	Leutnant	75	JG 54	Knight's Cross
Fritz Gromotka	Leutnant	29	JG 27	Knight's Cross
Alfred Gross	Leutnant	52	JG 54, JG 26	
Detlev Grossfuss	Oberleutnant	18	JG 2	
Erich Groth	Major	11	ZG 2, ZG 76	
Viktor Gruber	Feldwebel	10	JG 27	
Hans Grünberg	Oberleutnant	82/78	JG 3, JG 52, JG 7 JV 44	Knight's Cross
Walter Grünlinger*	Leutnant	7	JG 26	KIA 4 September 1943
Gerhard Grzymalla	Feldwebel	7/8	JG 26	
Hermann Guhl	Leutnant	15	LG 2, JG 26	
Joachim Günther	Leutnant	11	JG 26	
Wolf Gütter	Leutnant	6	NJG 3	WIA 14/15 July 1944
Gerhard Guttmann*	Felwebel	7	JG 26	KIA 27 March 1944

=== H ===
Name	Rank	Claims	Unit	Notes
Gerhard Haak*	Feldwebel	10	JG 54	KIA 25 October 1941
Sigurd Haala	Oberleutnant	42	JG 54, JG 26	German Cross
Friedrich Haas*	Leutnant	74	JG 52	Knight's Cross; KIA 9 April 1945
Ernst Haase*	Oberfeldwebel	8+	JG 302	German Cross; KIA 25 February 1945
Horst Haase*	Major	82/62/54	JG 51, JG 3	Knight's Cross; KIA 26 November 1944
Helmut Haberda*	Oberleutnant	59	JG 52	German Cross; KIA 8 May 1943
Karl Haberland*	Oberleutnant	9	JG 3, JG 2	KIA 27 January 1944
Wilhelm Hachfeld*	Hauptmann	11	LG 2, JG 51, ZG 2	Knight's Cross; KIFA 2 December 1942
August Hachtel	Oberleutnant	5	JG 400	Knight's Cross
Joachim Hacker	Leutnant	32/21	JG 51	
Anton Hackl	Major	192/180+	JG 77, JG 11, JG 26, JG 300	Knight's Cross with Oak Leaves and Swords incl. 34 heavy bombers
Heinrich "Heinz" Hackler*	Leutnant	56	JG 77	Knight's Cross; KIA 1 January 1945
Heinz-Martin Hadeball	Hauptmann	33/28	NJG 1, NJG 4, NJG 6, NJGr 10	Knight's Cross
Alfred Haesler	Major	5	V.(Z)/LG 1, ZG 26, NJG 1, NJG 4	WIA 10/11 August 1943
Anton "Toni" Hafner*	Oberleutnant	204/203	JG 51	Knight's Cross with Oak Leaves; KIA 17 October 1944
Ludwig Häfner*	Leutnant	52	JG 3	Knight's Cross; KIA 10 November 1942
Walter Hagenah	Leutnant	15	JG 3, JG 7	
Johannes Hager	Hauptmann	48/41	NJG 1	Knight's Cross
Franz Hahn*	Hauptmann	17+/14+	JG 77, JG 51, JG 4	KIA 22 January 1944
Hans "Assi" Hahn	Major	108/105	JG 2, JG 54	Knight's Cross with Oak Leaves
Hans von Hahn	Major	31	JG 53, JG 1, JG 103	Knight's Cross
Hans Hahn*	Leutnant	15/11	NJG 1, NJG 2	Knight's Cross; KIA 11/12 October 1941
Siegfried Hahn	Hauptmann	10	ZG 76, NJG 3	
Josef Haiböck	Hauptmann	73	JG 26, JG 52, JG 3	Knight's Cross
Karl Haisch*	Oberfeldwebel	10	NJG 3	KIFA 20 March 1943
Heinz Halstrick	Feldwebel	11	JG 5	
Joachim Hamer	Leutnant	35/29	JG 51	
Alfred Hammer	Hauptmann	26	JG 53	
Karl Hammerl*	Leutnant	67/63	JG 52	Knight's Cross; MIA 2 March 1943
Gotthard Handrick	Oberst	10 (+5 in Spain)	JG 26, JG 77	Gold medal at the 1936 Summer Olympics
Heinz Hanke		9	JG 1	
Günther Hannak	Hauptmann	47	LG 2, JG 77, JG 27	Knight's Cross
Gottfried Hanneck	Oberleutnant	6	NJG 1	WIA 1/2 February 1945
Horst Hannig*	Oberleutnant	98	JG 54, JG 2	Knight's Cross with Oak Leaves; KIA 15 May 1943
Joachim Hanss*	Leutnant	10	NJG 5	KIA 7/8 July 1944
Harro Harder	Hauptmann	22 (+11 in Spain)	JG 53	
Jürgen Harder*	Major	64	JG 53, JG 11	Knight's Cross with Oak Leaves; KIFA 17 February 1945
Hans Hartigs	Oberleutnant	6	JG 26	
Andreas Hartl	Feldwebel	8	JG 302	
Erich Hartmann	Major	352	JG 52, JG 53	Knight's Cross with Oak Leaves, Swords and Diamonds
Ludwig Hartmann	Oberfeldwebel	13	JG 2	
Hans-Dieter Hartwein	Oberleutnant	16	JG 5	
Helmut Haugk	Hauptmann	18	ZG 76, ZG 26	Knight's Cross
Werner Haugk*	Leutnant	9	StG 77, ZG 76	Knight's Cross; KIA 18 October 1944
Hans Hausschild	Feldwebel	7	NJG 100, NJG 200	
Wilhelm Hauswirth	Feldwebel	50	JG 52	
Alfred Heckmann	Oberleutnant	71/69	JG 3, JG 26, JV 44	Knight's Cross
Günther Heckmann	Leutnant	20/16	JG 51, JG 1, JG 7	
Hubert Heckmann	Leutnant	5	JG 1, JG 7	
Ernst Heesen*	Leutnant	32/28	JG 2, NJG 1, JG 3, JG 1	KIA 3 May 1943
Alfred Heidel	Oberfeldwebel	8	JG 27	
Bruno Heilig*	Oberleutnant	7	NJG 2, NJG 3	KIFA 6/7 January 1945
Joseph Heim*	Gefreiter	5	JG 7	KIA 10 April 1945
Friedrich Heimann	Oberfeldwebel	41	JG 51	
Kurt Hein	Feldwebel	8	JG 26	
Hans-Joachim Heinecke	Hauptmann	28	JG 27	
Engelbert Heiner*	Oberleutnant	15	KG 27, NJG 6	Knight's Cross; KIA 18/19 March 1945
Gerd Heintze	Feldwebel	5	NJG 5, NJG 100	
Emil Heinzelmann*	Feldwebel	5	NJG 1	KIFA 7 May 1944
Richard Heller*	Leutnant	22	ZG 26, ZG 10	Knight's Cross; KIA 5 April 1945
Horst Hennig*	Hauptmann	7	KG 77, NJG 3	Knight's Cross; KIFA 7/8 October 1944
Eberhard Henrici	Oberleutnant	6	JG 26	
Wilhelm Henseler	Oberleutnant	10	NJG 1	
Helmut Henz*	Hauptmann	6	JG 77	KIA 25 May 1941
Wilhelm Herget	Major	72	ZG 76, NJG 3, NJG 1, NJG 4, JV 44	Knight's Cross with Oak Leaves; PoW 2 May 1945
Kurt Hermann	Oberleutnant	9	NJG 2	
Rolf Hermichen	Major	64	JG 26, JG 11, JG 104	Knight's Cross with Oak Leaves incl. 26 heavy bombers
Hajo Herrmann	Oberst	9/4	KG 4, KG 30, JG Herrmann, JG 300	Knight's Cross with Oak Leaves and Swords
Kurt Herrmann	Oberleutnant	9	I.(Z)/LG 1, Z./KG 30, NJG 2	PoW 10/11 March 1941
Gerhard Herzog*	Stabsfeldwebel	11	ZG 76, NJG 1, NJG 6	KIA 20/21 October 1943
Heinrich Heuser	Feldwebel	5	JG 26	
Hans-Joachim Heyer*	Leutnant	53	JG 54	Knight's Cross; KIA 9 November 1942
Otto-Heinrich Hilleke	Leutnant	6	JG 26	
Ernst-Erich Hirschfeld*	Oberleutnant	24/17	JG 54, JG 300	Knight's Cross; KIA 28 July 1944
Heinz-Horst Hissbach*	Hauptmann	34/27	KG 28, KG 40, NJG 2	Knight's Cross; KIA 14/15 April 1945
Walter Höckner*	Major	68	JG 77, JG 26, JG 1, JG 4	Knight's Cross; KIFA 25 August 1944
Heinrich Höfemeier*	Oberleutnant	96	JG 51	Knight's Cross; KIA 7 August 1943
Friedrich Hoffmann*	Leutnant	11	JG 27	
Gerhard Hoffmann*	Leutnant	125/130	JG 52	Knight's Cross; KIFA 17 April 1945
Heinrich Hoffmann*	Oberfeldwebel	63	JG 51	Knight's Cross with Oak Leaves; KIA 3 October 1941
Hermann Hoffmann	Oberfeldwebel	7	JG 26	
Reinhold Hoffmann*	Oberleutnant	66	JG 54	Knight's Cross; KIA 24 May 1944
Reinhold Hoffmann	Feldwebel	8	JG 3	
Werner Hoffmann	Major	52/50 or 51	ZG 52, ZG 2, NJG 3, NJG 5	Knight's Cross
Karl-Wilhelm Hofmann*	Oberleutnant	44	JG 26	Knight's Cross; KIA 26 March 1945
Erich Hohagen	Major	56	JG 51, JG 2, JG 27, JG 7, JV 44	Knight's Cross
Werner Hohenberg	Feldwebel	27	JG 52, JG 2	
Walter Holl	Feldwebel	7	JG 26	
Kurt Holler*	Major	19/18/11+	ZG 26, NJG 1, NJG 4	KIA 21/22 June 1943
Otto Holler*	Unteroffizier	5	NJG 100	KIA 9/10 March 1944
Helmuth Holtz	Feldwebel	56	JG 51	
Gerhard Homuth*	Major	63	JG 27, JG 54	Knight's Cross; MIA 2 August 1943
Werner Hopf	Hauptmann	21	NJG 5	
Helmuth Hoppe	Hauptmann	22	JG 26	German Cross
Jürgen Hörschelmann*	Leutnant	16	JGr Süd, JG 3	KIA 12 May 1944
Walter Horten	Oberleutnant	5	JG 26	
Anton Hörwick*	Oberfeldwebel	27	NJG 2, NJG 7	Knight's Cross; KIA 19 February 1945
Dietrich Hrabak	Oberst	125	JG 76, JG 54, JG 52	Knight's Cross with Oak Leaves
Franz Hrdlicka*	Hauptmann	96/60	JG 77, JG 2	Knight's Cross; KIA 25 March 1945
Ferdinand Hromadnik	Leutnant	6	NJG 4	
Herbert Hubatsch	Feldwebel	5	NJG 1, NJG 2, NJG 5, NJG 6	WIA 6 September 1944
Rudolf Hübl	Oberfelwebel	9	JG 1	
Eckhard Hübner*	Leutnant	47	JG 3	Knight's Cross; KIA 28 March 1942
Werner Hübner	Oberfeldwebel	7	JG 51	
Wilhelm Hübner*	Leutnant	62	JG 51	Knight's Cross; KIA 7 April 1945
Rolf Huck	Hauptmann	6	NJG 3	
Karl Hülshoff	Oberleutnant	11/10	KG 54, NJG 1, NJG 2, NJG 102	
Alfred Humor*	Oberleutnant	16	JG 3	KIA 10 February 1944
Herbert Huppertz*	Major	68	JG 51, JG 5, JG 2	Knight's Cross with Oak Leaves; KIA 8 June 1944
Werner Husemann	Major	34/33	NJG 1, NJG 3	Knight's Cross
Wolf-Dietrich Huy	Hauptmann	40	JG 77	Knight's Cross with Oak Leaves

=== I ===
Name	Rank	Claims	Unit	Notes
Hans Iffland	Leutnant	11	JG 3	
Herbert Ihlefeld	Oberst	130 (incl. 7 in Spain)	I(J)/LG 2, JG 77, JG 52, JGr.25, JG 11, JG 1	Knight's Cross with Oak Leaves and Swords
Iro Ilk*	Major	9/8	LG 1, JG 300	Knight's Cross; KIA 25 September 1944
Eduard Isken	Oberfeldwebel	56/44+	JG 77, JGr 200, I(F)/123, JG 53	Knight's Cross

=== J ===
Name	Rank	Claims	Unit	Notes
Egbert Jaacks	Oberfeldwebel	44+	JG 76, JG 77, JG 53	
Hans-Joachim Jabs	Oberstleutnant	50/48	ZG 76, NJG 3, NJG 1	Knight's Cross with Oak Leaves
Ernst Jäckel	Feldwebel	8	JG 26	
Alfred Jakobi	Leutnant	8	JG 77, JG 5	
Wolfgang Jank	Hauptmann	11	NJG 3, NJG 200	
Erich Jauer	Feldwebel	12	JG 26	
Kurt Jenisch*	Leutnant	8	JG 27	
Peter Jenne*	Hauptmann	17/12+	JG 300	Knight's Cross; KIA 2 March 1945
Josef Jennewein*	Leutnant	86/83	JG 26, JG 51	Knight's Cross; MIA 27 July 1943
Heinrich Jessen	Oberleutnant	6	JG 26	
Hans Johannsen	Leutnant	8	JG 26	
Horst John*	Feldwebel	13	JG 52, JG Herrmann, JG 300	KIA 18/19 November 1943
Wilhelm Johnen	Hauptmann	34/33	NJG 1, NJG 5, NJG 6	Knight's Cross
Hermann-Friedrich Joppien*	Hauptmann	70/59	JG 51	Knight's Cross with Oak Leaves; KIA 28 August 1941
Günther Josten	Oberleutnant	178	JG 51	Knight's Cross with Oak Leaves
Erich Jung	Oberleutnant	27	NJG 2	
Harald Jung	Hauptmann	20	JG 51	
Heinrich Jung*	Hauptmann	68/65	JG 54	Knight's Cross; KIA 30 July 1943

=== K ===
Name	Rank	Claims	Unit	Notes
Kurt Kadlcick	Oberleutnant	6	NJG 4	
Erbo Graf von Kageneck*	Hauptmann	67	JG 27	Knight's Cross with Oak Leaves; DOW 12 January 1942
Adolf Kaiser	Oberleutnant	16	NJG 2, NJG 5, NJG 100	
Emil Kaiser	Oberleutnant	13	JG 27	
Herbert Kaiser	Leutnant	68	JG 77, JG 1, JV 44	Knight's Cross
Peter Kalden	Oberleutnant	84	JG 51	Knight's Cross
Rolf Kaldrack*	Hauptmann	21 (+3 in Spain)	ZG 76	Knight's Cross with Oak Leaves; KIA 3 February 1942
Ernst Kalinowski	Oberfeldwebel	5	ZG 76, NJG 1, NJG 3	
Adolf Kalkum	Oberfeldwebel	19	JG 53	
Herbert Kaminski	Major	7	ZG 76, JG 53	Knight's Cross
Hans-Karl Kamp*	Major	24	ZG 76, NJG 1, NJG 4, JG 300	KIA 31 December 1944
Fritz Karch	Hauptmann	47	JG 2	Knight's Cross
Hans Karlewski	Major	6	KG 53, NJG 101, NJG 1, NJG 2	
Eberhard Kaross	Leutnant	11/10	NJG 5, NJG 100	
Kurt Karsten	Oberfeldwebel	6	NJG 4, Luftbeobachterstaffel 7, NJG 6	
Erich Kayser	Leutnant	5+/6	NJG 5, NJG 100	PoW 25 January 1945, east of Labiau (present-day Polessk, Kaliningrad oblast)
Dietrich Kehl	Oberleutnant	6	JG 26	
Georg Keil	Leutnant	20+	JG 2	
Josef Keil	Unteroffizier	16	JG 3, JG 301	
Günther Kelch	Hauptmann	13	JG 26	
Johannes Keller	Unteroffizier	23	JG 51	
Lothar Keller	Hauptmann	23 (incl. 3 in Spain)	JG 3	Knight's Cross
Otto Keller	Leutnant	13	NJG 5	
Kurt Kelter	Leutnant	60	JG 54	
Heinz Kemethmüller	Oberleutnant	89	JG 3, JG 26	Knight's Cross
Karl-Heinz Kempf*	Leutnant	65	JG 54, JG 26	Knight's Cross; KIA 3 September 1944
Karl Kennel	Major	34	ZG 26, ZG 2, SG 1, SG 2	Knight's Cross with Oak Leaves
Gerhard Keppler	Leutnant	7	JG 27	
Georg Kiefner	Leutnant	12	JG 26, JV 44	
Johannes Kiel*	Hauptmann	25	ZG 26, ZG 76	Knight's Cross; KIA 29 January 1944
Willy Kientsch*	Oberleutnant	53	JG 27	Knight's Cross with Oak Leaves; KIA 29 January 1944
Rüdiger von Kirchmayr	Hauptmann	20+	JG 1, JG 11, JV 44	
Joachim Kirschner*	Hauptmann	188/181	JG 3, JG 27	Knight's Cross with Oak Leaves; 17 December 1943
Otto Kittel*	Oberleutnant	267/265+	JG 54	Knight's Cross with Oak Leaves and Swords; 16 February 1945
Ernst Klager	Oberleutnant	22	JG 53	
Alfons Klein	Oberleutnant	39/38	JG 52, JG 11	Knight's Cross
Johann Klein	Stabsfeldwebel	10	JG 52	
Hans Klein*	Stabsfeldwebel	5	JG 2	KIA 14 March 1941
Rudolf Klemm	Major	42/43	JG 54, JG 26	Knight's Cross
Heinrich Klöpper*	Oberleutnant	94/89	JG 51, JG 1	Knight's Cross; KIA 29 November 1943
Reinhold Knacke*	Hauptmann	45/44	ZG 1, NJG 1	Knight's Cross with Oak Leaves; KIA 3/4 February 1943
Kurt Knappe*	Oberfeldwebel	56	JG 51, JG 2	Knight's Cross; KIA 3 September 1943
Hans Knauth	Hauptmann	26	JG 51	
Wolfgang Knieling*	Oberleutnant	8	NJG 1, NJG 3, NJG 5, NJG 6	KIA 6/7 July 1944
Heinz Knoke	Hauptmann	33	JG 1, JG 11	Knight's Cross; 1/2 victory {Not awarded}+12 unconfirmed
Gerhard Koall	Hauptmann	38	JG 3, JG 54	Knight's Cross
Günther Köberich*	Hauptmann	14	NJG 3, NJG 2	KIA 8 April 1944 at Quakenbrück airfield
Hans-Günther Koch	Oberfeldwebel	9+	JG 51	
Harry Koch	Hauptmann	21+	JG 26, JG 2	
Herbert Koch	Oberleutnant	17	NJG 3	
Robert Koch	Feldwebel	5	NJG 1	PoW 6/7 October 1944
Josef Kociok*	Leutnant	33	ZG 76, SKG 210, 10.(NJ)/ZG 1, NJG 200	Knight's Cross; KIA 26/27 September 1943
Hans-Heinrich Koenig*	Hauptmann	28/25	ZG 76, NJG 3, Jagdstaffel Helgoland, JG 11	Knight's Cross; KIA 24 May 1944
Armin Köhler	Major	69	JG 27, JG 77	Knight's Cross
Walter Köhne	Leutnant	20+	JG 52, JG 1, JG 11, EJG 2	
Hans Kolbow	Oberleutnant	27	JG 20, JG 51	Knight's Cross
Reinhard Kollak	Stabsfeldwebel	49	ZG 1, NJG 1, NJG 4	Knight's Cross
Helmut Konter*	Leutnant	15–20/15	NJG 5, NJG 100	MIA in April 1945
Gerhard Köppen*	Leutnant	85	JG 52	Knight's Cross with Oak Leaves; MIA May 5, 1942
Hans-Günter von Kornatzki*	Oberstleutnant	6	JG 132, JG 52, JG 4	KIA 12 September 1944
Friedrich Körner	Oberleutnant	36	JG 27	Knight's Cross
Berthold Korts*	Leutnant	113/108	JG 52	Knight's Cross; KIA 29 August 1943
Eduard Koslowski	Oberfeldwebel	12	JG 53, JG 26	
Wolfgang Kosse	Hauptmann	18+	JG 26, JG 5, JG 1, JG 3	
Alfons Köster	Hauptmann	25/20	NJG 1, NJG 2, NJG 3	Knight's Cross; KIA 6/7 January 1945
Franz Köster	Unteroffizier	6	JG 7, EJG 2, JV 44	
Oskar Köstler*	Leutnant	6	NJG 1	KIA 9/10 April 1943
Willi Kothmann	Leutnant	13	JG 27	
Herbert Kowalski	Oberfeldwebel	5	JG 27	
Heinrich Krafft*	Hauptmann	78	JG 51, JG 3	Knight's Cross; KIA 14 December 1942
Josef Kraft	Hauptmann	56/51	NJG 4, NJG 5, NJG 6, NJG 1	Knight's Cross with Oak Leaves
Josef Krahforst*	Hauptmann	11	NJG 4	KIA 27/28 September 1944
Karl-Heinz Krahl	Hauptmann	24	JG 2, JG 3	Knight's Cross
Erich Krainik	Unteroffizier	12	JG 27	
Benno Kratz	Oberfeldwebel	6	NJG 6	WIA 25/26 March 1945
Hans Krause	Hauptmann	29/28	NJG 3, NJG 101, NJG 4	Knight's Cross
Herbert Krenz	Oberfeldwebel	12	JG 27	
Hans-Joachim Kroschinski	Leutnant	76	JG 54	Knight's Cross
Heinz Krug	Leutnant	9	JG 26	
"the Count" Walter Krupinski	Hauptmann	197	JG 52, JG 11, JG 26, JV 44	Knight's Cross with Oak Leaves
Fritz Kruse*	Oberfeldwebel	6	NJG 1	KIFA 17/18 May 1943
Elias Kühlein	Leutnant	20+	JG 51	
Wilhelm Küken	Oberfeldwebel	45	JG 51, JGr Ost	
Franz Kunz	Oberleutnant	12	JG 53, JG 26	
Josef Kunz	Leutnant	17	JG 5	
Wolfgang Kuthe*	Oberleutnant	8	NJG 3, NJG 2, NJG 1	KIFA 14 April 1943
Herbert Kutscha	Hauptmann	47	JG 3, JG 27, JG 11	Knight's Cross
Otto Kutzner	Feldwebel	10	NJG 3	WIA 7/8 March 1945

=== L ===
Name	Rank	Claims	Unit	Notes
August Lambert*	Oberleutnant	116/103	SG 2, SG 77	Knight's Cross; KIA 17 April 1945
Robert Landau*	Oberleutnant	5	NJG 5	KIA 19/20 July 1943
Günther Landt	Leutnant	22	JG 53	
Emil Lang*	Hauptmann	173/103	JG 54, JG 26	Knight's Cross with Oak Leaves; 18 in one day
Friedrich Lange	Leutnant	7	JG 26	
Heinz Lange	Major	70/73	JG 21, JG 54, JG 51	Knight's Cross
Hans-Joachim Langer	Feldwebel	9+	JG 51, JG 7	
Karl-Heinz Langer	Major	30	JG 3	Knight's Cross
Erwin Laskowski	Oberfeldwebel	46	JG 51, JG 11	Knight's Cross
Kurt Lasse*	Oberleutnant	39	JG 77	Knight's Cross; KIA 8 October 1941
Fritz Lau	Hauptmann	28/23/22	NJG 1	Knight's Cross
Karl Laub	Oberfeldwebel	7	JG 26	
Richard Launer	Oberfeldwebel	8	NJG 1, NJG 4, NJG 6	
Bernhard Lausch	Oberfeldwebel	36	JG 51	
Heinz Leber*	Leutnant	54	JG 51	Knight's Cross; KIA 1 June 1943
Alois Lechner*	Major	45	NJG 2, NJG 5, NJG 100	Knight's Cross; MIA 23 February 1944
Karl-Heinz Leesmann*	Major	37	JG 52, JG 1	Knight's Cross; KIA 25 July 1943
Erwin Leibold	Oberfeldwebel	11	JG 26	
Hans-Robert (Hans) Leickhardt*	Major	13	14.(Z)/LG 1, NJG 1, NJG 3, NJG 5	KIA 5/6 March 1945
Erich Leie*	Major	118/121	JG 2, JG 51, JG 77	Knight's Cross; KIA 7 March 1945
Hermann Leiste	Leutnant	30	JG 54	
Siegfried Lemke	Hauptmann	96	JG 2	Knight's Cross
Wilhelm Lemke*	Hauptmann	131	JG 3	Knight's Cross with Oak Leaves; KIA 4 December 1943
Helmut Lennartz	Feldwebel	8+	JG 11, JG 7, EKdo 262, Kdo Nowotny	
Helmut Lent*	Oberst	110/112	ZG 76, NJG 1, NJG 2, NJG 3	Knight's Cross with Oak Leaves, Swords and Diamonds; DoW 7 October 1944 following crash on 5 October, on approach to Paderborn airfield
Richard Leppla	Major	68	JG 51, JG 105, JG 6	Knight's Cross
Heinrich Lesch	Oberleutnant	7	JG 5	
Heinrich Leschert*	Oberfeldwebel	23	JG 53	KIA 10 August 1942
Hermann Leube*	Hauptmann	20	NJG 3	KIA 27/28 December 1944
Rolf Leuchs	Major	8	NJG 1, NJG 6, NJGr 10	
Rudolf Leuschel*	Hauptmann	9	JG 26	KIA 25 February 1944
Erwin Leykauf	Oberleutnant	33	JG 54	
Fritz Liebelt	Leutnant	15	JG 51	
Kurt Liedke	Hauptmann	11	JG 53, NJG 2, NJG 1, NJG 5	
Karl von Lieres und Wilkau	Oberleutnant	32	JG 27	
Frank Liesendahl*	Hauptmann	~5	JG 53, JG 2	Knight's Cross; KIA 17 July 1942
Arnold Lignitz*	Major	25	JG 51, JG 54	Knight's Cross; MIA 30 September 1941
Friedrich Lindelaub	Oberfeldwebel	5	JG 26	
Anton Lindner	Oberleutnant	73	JG 51	Knight's Cross
Lothar Linke*	Oberleutnant	28/27	ZG 76, NJG 1, NJG 2	Knight's Cross; KIFA 13/14 May 1943
Rudi Linz*	Leutnant	70	JG 5	Knight's Cross; KIA 9 February 1945
Helmut Lipfert	Hauptmann	203/200	JG 52, JG 53	Knight's Cross with Oak Leaves
Egmont Prinz zur Lippe-Weißenfeld*	Major	51/49	ZG 76, NJG 1, NJG 2, NJG 3, NJG 5	Knight's Cross with Oak Leaves; KIFA 12 March 1944
Wolfgang Lippert*	Hauptmann	29 (+4 in Spain)	JG 53, JG 27	Knight's Cross; KIA 3 December 1941
Stefan Litjens	Oberfeldwebel	38	JG 53	Knight's Cross
Gerhard Loos*	Oberleutnant	92	JG 54	Knight's Cross; KIA 6 March 1944
Kurt Loos*	Hauptmann	11	ZG 2, NJG 1, NJG 5, JG 300	KIA 24 March 1945
Walter Loos	Oberfeldwebel	38	JG 301, JG 3	Knight's Cross
Ferdinand Löschenkohl	Leutnant	11	JG 3, JG 7	
Fritz Losigkeit	Major	68	JG 26, JG 1, JG 51, JG 77	Knight's Cross
August Lübking	Oberfeldwebel	38	JG 5, JG 7	
Werner Lucas*	Hauptmann	106/105	JG 3	Knight's Cross; KIA 24 October 1943
Max-Hermann Lücke*	Oberleutnant	81	JG 51	Knight's Cross; KIA 8 November 1943
Fritz Lüddecke*	Oberfeldwebel	51	JG 51	Knight's Cross; KIA 10 August 1944
Robert Lüddeke	Oberfeldwebel	11	2./KG 2, Nachtjagdkette 1, NJG 1, NJG 2	
Franz Lüders	Feldwebel	5	JG 26	
Herbert Ludwig*	Leutnant	13 or 14	NJG 1, NJG 2, NJSch 1, NJG 101, NJG 6	KIA 23/24 April 1945
Herbert Lütje	Oberstleutnant	53/48	12.(N)/JG 2, NJG 1, NJG 6	Knight's Cross with Oak Leaves
Johannes Lutter	Hauptmann	12	ZG 1, ZG 76, ZG 2, SKG 210, SKG 10, SG 4	Knight's Cross
Günther Lützow*	Oberst	108 (incl. 5 in Spain)/105/200	JG 3, JV 44	Knight's Cross with Oak Leaves and Swords; MIA 24 April 1945
August Luy	Oberfeldwebel	5+	JG 5	
