= List of aerial victories claimed by Erich Hartmann =

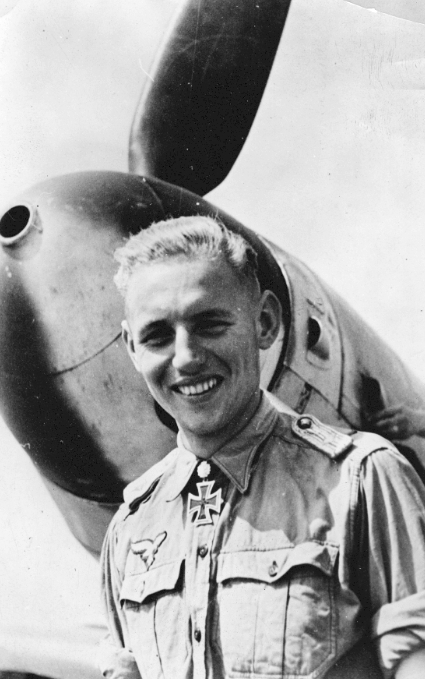
Hartmann before a Messerschmitt Bf 109

Erich Alfred Hartmann (19 April 1922 – 20 September 1993) was a German fighter pilot during World War II and the most successful fighter ace in the history of aerial warfare. He flew 1,404 combat missions and participated in aerial combat on 825 separate occasions. He was credited with shooting down a total of 352 Allied aircraft: 345 Soviet planes and seven American while serving with the Luftwaffe. During the course of his career, Hartmann was forced to crash-land his fighter 16 times due either to mechanical failure or damage received from parts of enemy aircraft he had shot down; he was never shot down from direct enemy action.

== List of aerial victories claimed ==
According to US historian David T. Zabecki, Hartmann was credited with 352 aerial victories. Spick also lists Hartmann with 352 aerial victories claimed in 1,425 combat missions, all of which on the Eastern Front, and a mission-to-claim ratio of 4.05. Mathews and Foreman, authors of Luftwaffe Aces – Biographies and Victory Claims, researched the German Federal Archives and found records for 352 aerial victory claims, plus two further unconfirmed claims. This number includes two claims over United States Army Air Forces flown P-51 Mustangs, and 350 Soviet Air Forces piloted aircraft on the Eastern Front.

Victory claims were logged to a map-reference (PQ = Planquadrat), for example "PQ 44793". The Luftwaffe grid map (Jägermeldenetz) covered all of Europe, western Russia and North Africa and was composed of rectangles measuring 15 minutes of latitude by 30 minutes of longitude, an area of about 360 square miles (930 km^{2}). These sectors were then subdivided into 36 smaller units to give a location area 3 km × 4 km (1.9 mi × 2.5 mi) in size.

♠ (Ace of spades) indicates those aerial victories which made Hartmann an "ace-in-a-day", a term which designates a fighter pilot who has shot down five or more airplanes in a single day.
– (dash) indicates unconfirmed aerial victory claims for which Hartmann did not receive credit.
? (question mark) indicates information discrepancies listed by Barbas, Prien, Stemmer, Rodeike, Balke, Bock, Mathews and Foreman.
! (exclamation mark) indicates that the authors Barbas, Prien, Stemmer, Rodeike, Balke, Bock, Mathews and Foreman disagree on the time of claim.
* (asterisk) indicates that the authors Barbas, Prien, Stemmer, Rodeike, Balke, Bock, Mathews and Foreman disagree on the claimed aircraft type.

Claims with 7. Staffel of Jagdgeschwader 52
Claim	Date	Time	Type	Location	Claim	Date	Time	Type	Location
1	5 November 1942	12:05	Il-2	PQ 44793	45♠	1 August 1943	17:05	LaGG-3* (Note: According to both Barbas, and Mathews and Foreman claimed as a Lavochkin-Gorbunov-Gudkov aircraft.)	PQ 35 Ost 53491
2	27 January 1943	11:30	MiG-1	PQ 15102; PQ 15112	46♠	1 August 1943	19:21	LaGG-3*	PQ 35 Ost 53131 vicinity of Shanlykino
3	9 February 1943	10:20	LaGG-3	PQ 34 Ost 86722 northeast of Tikhovskiy	47♠	1 August 1943	19:40	LaGG-3*	PQ 35 Ost 54584
4	10 February 1943	06:15	Boston	PQ 34 Ost 86671 northeast of Ivanovskaja	48	3 August 1943	11:17	LaGG-3*	PQ 35 Ost 61334; 10 km (6.2 mi) north of Tomarovka
5	24 March 1943	13:00	U-2	PQ 34 Ost 86712 vicinity of Slavyansk-na-Kubani	49	3 August 1943	11:22	LaGG-3*	PQ 35 Ost 61412; 15 km (9.3 mi) north of Belgorod
6	27 March 1943	11:50	I-16	PQ 34 Ost 85171, east of Krymsk vicinity of Usun	50	3 August 1943	11:45	LaGG-3*	PQ 35 Ost 61192, northwest of Belgorod; 10 km (6.2 mi) east of Krasny Liman
7	15 April 1943	15:33	P-39* (Note: According to Barbas claimed as a Lavochkin-Gorbunov-Gudkov aircraft.)	PQ 34 Ost 85192, east of Krymsk; PQ 85712 north Mertschanskaja	51	3 August 1943	18:05	LaGG-3* (Note: According to Barbas claimed as a Lavochkin-Gorbunov-Gudkov aircraft, while Mathews and Foreman list this claim as a Lavochkin La-5.)	PQ 35 Ost 61193; 10 km (6.2 mi) east of Krasny Liman
8	26 April 1943	11:35	R-5	PQ 34 Ost 86722 northeast of Tikhovskiy	52♠	4 August 1943	10:19	LaGG-3*	PQ 35 Ost 61391; 10 km (6.2 mi) southwest of Belgorod
9	28 April 1943	09:30	LaGG-3	PQ 34 Ost 85122; Sswobodnyj	53♠	4 August 1943	10:30	LaGG-3*	PQ 35 Ost 61331; 10 km (6.2 mi) north of Tomarovka
10	30 April 1943	16:00	LaGG-3	PQ 34 Ost 85712; PQ 85112 north of Mertschanskaja	54♠	4 August 1943	10:50	LaGG-3*	PQ 35 Ost 61334; 10 km (6.2 mi) north of Tomarovka
11	30 April 1943	16:20	LaGG-3	PQ 34 Ost 85752; PQ 85152 east of Sorin	55♠	4 August 1943	13:43	LaGG-3*	PQ 35 Ost 61343; 25 km (16 mi) west of Tomarovka
12	7 May 1943	08:05	LaGG-3	PQ 34 Ost 75262 south of Krymsk	56♠	4 August 1943	15:40	LaGG-3*	PQ 35 Ost 51462; 25 km (16 mi) northeast of Grayvoron
13	7 May 1943	16:43	LaGG-3*	PQ 34 Ost 85171, southwest of Abinsk vicinity of Usun	57♠	5 August 1943	09:00	LaGG-3*	PQ 35 Ost 61351; 15 km (9.3 mi) west of Tomarovka
14	11 May 1943	05:45	LaGG-3*	PQ 34 Ost 75234 vicinity of Krymsk	58♠	5 August 1943	11:50	LaGG-3*	PQ 35 Ost 61323; 10 km (6.2 mi) south of Krasny Liman
15	11 May 1943	05:55	LaGG-3*	PQ 34 Ost 85144 vicinity of Abinsk	59♠	5 August 1943	12:00	LaGG-3*	PQ 35 Ost 61314; 15 km (9.3 mi) southwest of Krasny Liman
16	15 May 1943	12:10	U-2	PQ 34 Ost 86544 west of Krasnoarmeysky	60♠	5 August 1943	17:04	LaGG-3*	PQ 35 Ost 61333; 10 km (6.2 mi) north of Tomarovka
17	23 May 1943	05:45	LaGG-3*	PQ 34 Ost 85253 east of Severskaya	61♠	5 August 1943	17:24	LaGG-3*	PQ 35 Ost 61441; 10 km (6.2 mi) north of Belgorod
18	5 July 1943	03:40	Il-2 m.H. (Note: The "m.H." refers to an Ilyushin Il-2 with rear gunner (mit Heckschütze).)	PQ 35 Ost 61663; 10 km (6.2 mi) north of Vovchansk	62	6 August 1943	16:08	LaGG-3*	PQ 35 Ost 61393; 10 km (6.2 mi) southwest of Belgorod
19	5 July 1943	07:10	LaGG-3*	PQ 35 Ost 61151; 10 km (6.2 mi) north of Krasny Liman	63♠	7 August 1943	08:30	LaGG-3*	PQ 35 Ost 61391; 10 km (6.2 mi) southwest of Belgorod
20	5 July 1943	14:00	Il-2 m.H.	PQ 35 Ost 61333; 10 km (6.2 mi) north Tomarovka	64♠	7 August 1943	08:35	LaGG-3*	PQ 35 Ost 61384 vicinity of Orlowka
21	5 July 1943	18:15	LaGG-3*	PQ 35 Ost 61124; Bogatoje	65♠	7 August 1943	11:55	Pe-2	PQ 35 Ost 61561; 20 km (12 mi) south-southwest of Belgorod
22♠	7 July 1943	03:50	Il-2 m.H.	PQ 35 Ost 61183; Krasny Liman	66♠	7 August 1943	12:00	LaGG-3*	PQ 35 Ost 61551; 20 km (12 mi) northeast of Zolochev
23♠	7 July 1943	03:52	Il-2 m.H.	PQ 35 Ost 61154; 10 km (6.2 mi) north of Krasny Liman	67♠	7 August 1943	12:20	Pe-2	PQ 35 Ost 61373; 25 km (16 mi) west-southwest of Tomarovka
24♠	7 July 1943	06:05	Il-2 m.H.	PQ 35 Ost 61331; 10 km (6.2 mi) north of Tomarovka	68	8 August 1943	07:15	LaGG-3*	PQ 35 Ost 61572; 10 km (6.2 mi) east of Zolochev
25♠	7 July 1943	06:10	LaGG-3*	PQ 35 Ost 61182 vicinity of Krasny Liman	69	8 August 1943	09:53	LaGG-3*	PQ 35 Ost 61632; 15 km (9.3 mi) north of Vovchansk
26♠	7 July 1943	17:15	LaGG-3*	PQ 35 Ost 61214 southwest of Prokhorovka	70	8 August 1943	10:15! (Note: According to both Barbas, and Mathews and Foreman claimed at 10:18.)	LaGG-3*	PQ 35 Ost 61612; 15 km (9.3 mi) south of Belgorod
27♠	7 July 1943	17:20	LaGG-3*	PQ 35 Ost 62872, northwest of Prokhorovka; PQ 62873; 10 km (6.2 mi) northwest of Prokhorovka	71	8 August 1943	12:54	LaGG-3*	PQ 35 Ost 60253; 30 km (19 mi) east-southeast of Kharkov
28♠	7 July 1943	17:30	LaGG-3*	PQ 35 Ost 62792; 15 km (9.3 mi) northwest of Prokhorovka	72	9 August 1943	06:14	La-5*	PQ 35 Ost 61821; 15 km (9.3 mi) southwest of Vovchansk
29	8 July 1943	09:05	LaGG-3*	PQ 35 Ost 61223; 10 km (6.2 mi) east of Prokhorovka	73	9 August 1943	09:30	LaGG-3*	PQ 35 Ost 61581; 20 km (12 mi) east of Zolochev
30	8 July 1943	09:10	LaGG-3*	PQ 35 Ost 61221; 10 km (6.2 mi) south of Prokhorovka	74	9 August 1943	16:30	LaGG-3*	PQ 35 Ost 61561; 20 km (12 mi) south-southwest of Belgorod
31	8 July 1943	18:05	LaGG-3*	PQ 35 Ost 62872; 10 km (6.2 mi) north of Prokhorovka	75	9 August 1943	16:40	LaGG-3*	PQ 35 Ost 61814; 25 km (16 mi) west-southwest of Vovchansk
32	8 July 1943	18:25	LaGG-3*	PQ 35 Ost 61134; 10 km (6.2 mi) northwest of Prokhorovka	76	12 August 1943	08:55	LaGG-3*	PQ 35 Ost 61772; 15 km (9.3 mi) northwest of Kharkov
33	9 July 1943	07:25	Il-2 m.H.	PQ 35 Ost 61272	77	15 August 1943	09:14	Pe-2	PQ 35 Ost 60214; 25 km (16 mi) east of Kharkov
34	9 July 1943	09:10	LaGG-3*	PQ 35 Ost 62871, Wesselij; 10 km (6.2 mi) north of Prokhorovka	78	15 August 1943	18:10	LaGG-3*	PQ 35 Ost 70762; 15 km (9.3 mi) southeast of Izium
35	9 July 1943	09:20	LaGG-3*	PQ 35 Ost 62844; 20 km (12 mi) north of Prokhorovka	79	17 August 1943	05:20	LaGG-3*	PQ 35 Ost 70841; 20 km (12 mi) northwest of Krasny Liman
36	10 July 1943	07:05	LaGG-3*	PQ 35 Ost 62872; 10 km (6.2 mi) north of Prokhorovka	80	17 August 1943	12:30	P-39	PQ 35 Ost 70791, Tichocki; 20 km (12 mi) southeast of Izium
37	11 July 1943	16:55	LaGG-3*	PQ 35 Ost 62883; 20 km (12 mi) northeast of Prokhorovka	81	17 August 1943	13:05	P-39*	PQ 35 Ost 70842, Korowin-Jar; 20 km (12 mi) northwest of Krasny Liman
38	15 July 1943	17:20	LaGG-3*	PQ 35 Ost 54562 southwest of Bolkhov	82	17 August 1943	17:40	P-39	PQ 35 Ost 70871; 15 km (9.3 mi) northwest of Krasny Liman
39	16 July 1943	14:15	LaGG-3*	PQ 35 Ost 54661 west of Bolkhov	83	18 August 1943	10:00	LaGG-3*	PQ 35 Ost 60193; 20 km (12 mi) southeast of Kharkov
40	17 July 1943	19:25	LaGG-3* (Note: According to both Barbas, and Mathews and Foreman claimed as a Lavochkin La-5.)	PQ 35 Ost 54497 west of Zubkovo	84	18 August 1943	12:45	LaGG-3*	PQ 35 Ost 61792; 15 km (9.3 mi) northeast of Kharkov
—	21 July 1943	—	La-5	east of Oryol	85	18 August 1943	12:55	LaGG-3*	PQ 35 Ost 60134; 10 km (6.2 mi) east of Kharkov
—	21 July 1943	—	La-5	east of Oryol	86	19 August 1943	10:35	LaGG-3*	PQ 34 Ost 88263; 10 km (6.2 mi) east of Marinowka
41	31 July 1943	10:00	LaGG-3*	PQ 35 Ost 54623	87	19 August 1943	10:50	LaGG-3*	PQ 34 Ost 98132; 15 km (9.3 mi) south of Rovenki
42	31 July 1943	16:55	LaGG-3*	PQ 35 Ost 64541 vicinity of Telchje	88	19 August 1943	16:25	P-39	PQ 34 Ost 88281; 5 km (3.1 mi) southwest of Jalisawehino
43♠	1 August 1943	11:40	LaGG-3*	PQ 35 Ost 64523	89	20 August 1943	06:07	Il-2	PQ 34 Ost 88263 east Marinowka
44♠	1 August 1943	14:40	LaGG-3*	PQ 35 Ost 54663 west of Bolkhov	90	20 August 1943	06:08	Il-2	PQ 34 Ost 88263; 10 km (6.2 mi) east Marinowka
On 2 September 1943, Hartmann was transferred and appointed Staffelkapitän (squadron leader) of 9. Staffel (9th squadron) of JG 52.
Claims with 9. Staffel of Jagdgeschwader 52
Claim	Date	Time	Type	Location	Claim	Date	Time	Type	Location
91	15 September 1943	12:20	Yak-9*	PQ 34 Ost 68314; PQ 68384; 5 km (3.1 mi) north of Polohy	198♠	26 February 1944	11:58	P-39	PQ 34 Ost 29524; PQ 29542; 20 km (12 mi) south-southwest of Kirovograd
92	18 September 1943	07:35	LaGG-3*	PQ 34 Ost 69563; 40 km (25 mi) east-northeast of Pavlohrad	199♠	26 February 1944	12:03	P-39	PQ 34 Ost 29524 vicinity of Alexandrovsk
93	18 September 1943	10:35	LaGG-3	PQ 34 Ost 68391; 15 km (9.3 mi) northeast of Polohy	200♠	26 February 1944	14:40	P-39	PQ 34 Ost 29552 vicinity of Alexandrovsk
94	18 September 1943	13:50	LaGG-3*	PQ 34 Ost 68392; PQ 68372; 15 km (9.3 mi) west-northwest of Polohy	201♠	26 February 1944	14:45	P-39	PQ 34 Ost 29531; PQ 29551; 10 km (6.2 mi) east of Alexandrovsk
95	18 September 1943	13:55	LaGG-3*	PQ 34 Ost 68332; PQ 68312; 25 km (16 mi) southwest of Pokrovskoye	202♠	26 February 1944	14:50	P-39	PQ 34 Ost 29512; 10 km (6.2 mi) west of Alexandrovsk
96	19 September 1943	14:40	LaGG-3*	PQ 34 Ost 58614; 25 km (16 mi) south-southwest of Bolshoy Tokmak	203	23 April 1944	15:45	LaGG*	PQ 34 Ost 35351 vicinity of Chersones over the Black Sea, 20 km (12 mi) west of Sevastopol
97	19 September 1943	15:10	LaGG-3*	PQ 34 Ost 59599; PQ 58591; 20 km (12 mi) west of Bolshoy Tokmak	204	24 April 1944	11:55	LaGG	PQ 34 Ost 35474 north of Balaklava; 10 km (6.2 mi) south of Sevastopol
98	20 September 1943	13:30	LaGG-3	PQ 34 Ost 59394; 30 km (19 mi) southeast of Dnepropetrovsk	205	24 April 1944	12:15	P-39	PQ 34 Ost 35474 southeast of Sevastopol; 10 km (6.2 mi) south of Sevastopol
99	20 September 1943	13:40	LaGG-3*	PQ 34 Ost 59474; 20 km (12 mi) west of Pavlohrad	206	26 April 1944	14:15	P-39* (Note: According to Barbas claimed as an Ilyushin Il-2.)	PQ 34 Ost 35474 north of Balaklava; 10 km (6.2 mi) south of Sevastopol
100	20 September 1943	15:35	P-39	PQ 34 Ost 58682; 5 km (3.1 mi) north of Bolshoy Tokmak	207	26 April 1944	14:20	P-39	PQ 34 Ost 35481; 15 km (9.3 mi) southeast of Sevastopol
101	20 September 1943	15:50	LaGG-3*	PQ 34 Ost 58334; 15 km (9.3 mi) southeast of Zaporizhzhia	208	3 May 1944	15:45	LaGG*	PQ 34 Ost 35273; 20 km (12 mi) north-northeast of Sevastopol
102	25 September 1943	07:55	LaGG-3*	PQ 34 Ost 58532; PQ 58552 vicinity of Vasylivka	209	4 May 1944	16:10	LaGG	PQ 34 Ost 35424; PQ 35724 over the Black Sea, 45 km (28 mi) south-southwest of Sevastopol
103	25 September 1943	12:43	LaGG-3*	PQ 34 Ost 58831; 15 km (9.3 mi) east of Bolshoy Tokmak	210	4 May 1944	17:35	LaGG	PQ 34 Ost 35424; 20 km (12 mi) northeast of Sevastopol
104	25 September 1943	16:35	LaGG-3*	PQ 34 Ost 58611; 25 km (16 mi) south-southwest of Bolshoy Tokmak	211	4 May 1944	17:50	LaGG	PQ 34 Ost 35214 over the Black Sea, 20 km (12 mi) south of Saky
105	26 September 1943	06:55	LaGG-3*	PQ 34 Ost 58631; PQ 58691; 15 km (9.3 mi) west-northwest of Bolshoy Tokmak	212♠	5 May 1944	08:20	LaGG* (Note: According to Mathews and Foreman claimed as a Lavochkin La-7.)	PQ 34 Ost 35421, northeast of Sevastopol; PQ 35421; 20 km (12 mi) north-northeast of Sevastopol
106	26 September 1943	07:05	P-39	PQ 34 Ost 58554 southeast of Vasylivka	213♠	5 May 1944	10:45	LaGG* (Note: According to Mathews and Foreman claimed as a Lavochkin La-5.)	PQ 34 Ost 35614 over the Black Sea, 10 km (6.2 mi) south of Sevastopol
107	26 September 1943	09:55	P-39	PQ 34 Ost 58592; 20 km (12 mi) west of Bolshoy Tokmak	214♠	5 May 1944	10:48	LaGG*	PQ 34 Ost 35612 over the Black Sea, 10 km (6.2 mi) south of Sevastopol
108	27 September 1943	11:15	LaGG-3*	PQ 34 Ost 58611; 25 km (16 mi) south-southwest of Bolshoy Tokmak	215♠	5 May 1944	10:54	LaGG	PQ 34 Ost 35532 over the Black Sea, 20 km (12 mi) south-southwest of Sevastopol
109	27 September 1943	11:25	LaGG-3*	PQ 34 Ost 58643; 15 km (9.3 mi) northwest of Bolshoy Tokmak	216♠	5 May 1944	14:05	LaGG*	PQ 34 Ost 35274; 20 km (12 mi) north-northeast of Sevastopol
110	28 September 1943	16:30	La-5*	PQ 34 Ost 58641; 15 km (9.3 mi) northwest of Bolshoy Tokmak	217♠	5 May 1944	14:15	LaGG*	PQ 34 Ost 35423, northeast of Sevastopol; PQ 35423; 20 km (12 mi) northeast of Sevastopol
111	29 September 1943	06:50	LaGG-3*	PQ 34 Ost 58644; 15 km (9.3 mi) northwest of Bolshoy Tokmak	218	6 May 1944	10:45	LaGG	PQ 34 Ost 35442; Sevastopol
112	29 September 1943	08:55	P-39	PQ 34 Ost 58682; 5 km (3.1 mi) north of Bolshoy Tokmak	219	7 May 1944	09:27	P-39	PQ 34 Ost 35644 over the Black Sea, 25 km (16 mi) south of Sevastopol
113	30 September 1943	06:55	LaGG-3*	PQ 34 Ost 58681; 5 km (3.1 mi) north of Bolshoy Tokmak	220	7 May 1944	09:30	P-39	PQ 34 Ost 35641 over the Black Sea, 25 km (16 mi) south of Sevastopol
114	30 September 1943	14:30	P-39	PQ 34 Ost 58732; 20 km (12 mi) west of Bolshoy Tokmak	221	7 May 1944	09:40	P-39	PQ 34 Ost 35483; 15 km (9.3 mi) southeast of Sevastopol
115	30 September 1943	16:40	P-39	PQ 34 Ost 58583; 20 km (12 mi) northwest of Bilozirka	222	8 May 1944	09:35! (Note: According to both Barbas, and Mathews and Foreman claimed at 09:25.)	LaGG	PQ 34 Ost 35612 over the Black Sea, 10 km (6.2 mi) south of Sevastopol
116	1 October 1943	12:20	LaGG-3*	PQ 34 Ost 58641; 15 km (9.3 mi) northwest of Bolshoy Tokmak	223	8 May 1944	13:45	LaGG	PQ 34 Ost 35362 over the Black Sea, 10 km (6.2 mi) west of Sevastopol
117	1 October 1943	12:30	LaGG-3*	PQ 34 Ost 58762; 20 km (12 mi) north-northeast of Fedorivka	224	20 May 1944	12:24	La-5*	PQ 24 Ost 98754; 5 km (3.1 mi) south of Grigoriopol
118	2 October 1943	08:40	LaGG-3*	PQ 34 Ost 58833; 15 km (9.3 mi) east of Bolshoy Tokmak	225	20 May 1944	18:25	La-5	PQ 24 Ost 98711; PQ 98765; 10 km (6.2 mi) southeast of Grigoriopol
119	2 October 1943	08:50	Pe-2	PQ 34 Ost 58762; 20 km (12 mi) north-northeast of Fedorivka	226	29 May 1944	15:35	P-39	PQ 24 Ost 78764; 10 km (6.2 mi) west of Iași
120	2 October 1943	11:40	P-39	PQ 34 Ost 58851; 10 km (6.2 mi) south of Bolshoy Tokmak	227	30 May 1944	11:25	P-39	PQ 24 Ost 78644; 10 km (6.2 mi) south of Țuțora
121	2 October 1943	13:55	LaGG-3*	PQ 34 Ost 58672; 10 km (6.2 mi) northwest of Bolshoy Tokmak	228	30 May 1944	14:38	P-39	PQ 24 Ost 78613; PQ 78673; 15 km (9.3 mi) north of Iași
122	3 October 1943	10:10	LaGG-3*	PQ 34 Ost 58592; 15 km (9.3 mi) northwest of Iași.	229	31 May 1944	18:05	P-39	PQ 24 Ost 78677; PQ 78647; 10 km (6.2 mi) south of Țuțora
123	3 October 1943	16:05	LaGG-3*	PQ 34 Ost 58591; 20 km (12 mi) west of Bolshoy Tokmak	230	31 May 1944	18:08	P-39	PQ 24 Ost 78614; PQ 78684; 8 km (5.0 mi) north of Iași
124	4 October 1943	07:25	P-39	PQ 34 Ost 58614; 25 km (16 mi) south-southwest of Bolshoy Tokmak	231	31 May 1944	18:13	P-39	PQ 24 Ost 78733; 15 km (9.3 mi) north of Iași
125	11 October 1943	13:10! (Note: According to both Barbas, and Mathews and Foreman claimed at 13:40.)	LaGG-3*	PQ 34 Ost 58123; PQ 58124; 15 km (9.3 mi) north-northeast of Zaporizhzhia	232♠	1 June 1944	11:31	LaGG	PQ 24 Ost 78677; 15 km (9.3 mi) north of Iași
126	12 October 1943	07:00	LaGG-3*	PQ 34 Ost 58134; 20 km (12 mi) northeast of Zaporizhzhia	233♠	1 June 1944	11:38	LaGG	PQ 24 Ost 78813; 15 km (9.3 mi) south of Iași
127	12 October 1943	07:15	LaGG-3*	PQ 34 Ost 58241; 25 km (16 mi) east-northeast of Zaporizhzhia	234♠	1 June 1944	14:20	LaGG	PQ 24 Ost 78648; 10 km (6.2 mi) south of Țuțora
128	12 October 1943	07:35	LaGG-3*	PQ 34 Ost 58211; 30 km (19 mi) northeast of Zaporizhzhia	235♠	1 June 1944	14:30	LaGG	PQ 24 Ost 78673; 15 km (9.3 mi) north of Iași
129	12 October 1943	15:00	LaGG-3*	PQ 34 Ost 58161; 20 km (12 mi) east of Zaporizhzhia	236♠	1 June 1944	14:32	P-39	PQ 24 Ost 78673 vicinity of Carpiti; 15 km (9.3 mi) north of Iași
130	13 October 1943	10:35	LaGG-3*	PQ 34 Ost 58181; 5 km (3.1 mi) southeast of Zaporizhzhia	237♠	1 June 1944	14:35	LaGG* (Note: According to both Barbas, and Mathews and Foreman claimed as a Bell P-39 Airacobra.)	PQ 24 Ost 78675; 15 km (9.3 mi) north of Iași
131	14 October 1943	08:20	LaGG-3*	PQ 34 Ost 58184; 5 km (3.1 mi) southeast of Zaporizhzhia	238	2 June 1944	17:10	P-39	PQ 24 Ost 78658; PQ 78685; 20 km (12 mi) northeast of Iași
132	14 October 1943	08:25	LaGG-3*	PQ 34 Ost 58151 northeast of Zaporizhzhia	239	2 June 1944	17:15	P-39	PQ 24 Ost 7864; PQ 78649; 10 km (6.2 mi) south of Țuțora
133	14 October 1943	15:20	LaGG-3*	PQ 34 Ost 58153 northeast of Zaporizhzhia	240	3 June 1944	13:30	P-39	PQ 24 Ost 78825; 10 km (6.2 mi) south of Iași
134	15 October 1943	08:59	LaGG-3*	PQ 34 Ost 58153 northeast of Zaporizhzhia	241	3 June 1944	13:33	P-39	PQ 24 Ost 78813; PQ 78513; 40 km (25 mi) west of Țuțora
135	15 October 1943	09:05	LaGG-3*	PQ 34 Ost 58154 northeast of Zaporizhzhia	242	3 June 1944	14:00	LaGG	PQ 24 Ost 78733; 15 km (9.3 mi) northwest of Iași
136	15 October 1943	11:50	LaGG-3*	PQ 34 Ost 58181; 5 km (3.1 mi) southeast of Zaporizhzhia	243	3 June 1944	16:17	LaGG	PQ 24 Ost 78568; 15 km (9.3 mi) southwest of Țuțora
137	20 October 1943	07:15	P-39	PQ 34 Ost 39472; 20 km (12 mi) southeast of Mironovka	244♠	4 June 1944	15:10	P-39	PQ 24 Ost 78733; 15 km (9.3 mi) northwest of Iași
138	20 October 1943	07:20	P-39	PQ 34 Ost 39393; 10 km (6.2 mi) east of Stschastliwaja	245♠	4 June 1944	15:25	LaGG	PQ 24 Ost 78595; 15 km (9.3 mi) northwest of Iași
139	20 October 1943	14:42	P-39	PQ 34 Ost 39534; 20 km (12 mi) southwest of Stschastliwaja	246♠	4 June 1944	17:13	P-39	PQ 24 Ost 78596; 15 km (9.3 mi) northwest of Iași
140	21 October 1943	07:40	La-7*	PQ 34 Ost 39481 vicinity of Piatykhatky	247♠	4 June 1944	17:23	P-39	PQ 24 Ost 78591; 15 km (9.3 mi) northwest of Iași
141	24 October 1943	14:10	LaGG-3* (Note: According to Barbas claimed as a Lavochkin-Gorbunov-Gudkov aircraft, while Mathews and Foreman list this claim as a Bell P-39 Airacobra.)	PQ 34 Ost 57753; PQ 59153; 30 km (19 mi) north of Zaporizhzhia	248♠	4 June 1944	17:53	P-39	PQ 24 Ost 7859; PQ 78599; 15 km (9.3 mi) northwest of Iași
142	24 October 1943	14:35	P-39	PQ 34 Ost 58534, Gadkij vicinity of Vasylivka	249♠	4 June 1944	18:15	P-39	PQ 24 Ost 78565; PQ 78560; 15 km (9.3 mi) southwest of Țuțora
143	25 October 1943	10:00	Pe-2	PQ 34 Ost 49523; 60 km (37 mi) west of Dnipropetrovsk	250♠	4 June 1944	18:18	P-39	PQ 24 Ost 7856; 15 km (9.3 mi) southwest of Țuțora
144	25 October 1943	15:30	La-7*	PQ 34 Ost 57182; 10 km (6.2 mi) southwest of Melitopol	251♠	5 June 1944	13:11! (Note: According to both Barbas, and Mathews and Foreman claimed at 13:12.)	P-39	20 km (12 mi) northwest of Iași northwest of Iași; 23 km (14 mi) northwest of Iași
145	26 October 1943	08:08	P-39	PQ 34 Ost 57181; 10 km (6.2 mi) southwest of Melitopol	252♠	5 June 1944	13:19	P-39	5 km (3.1 mi) west of Iași north of Iași vicinity of Iași
146	26 October 1943	08:15	P-39	PQ 34 Ost 57153; 5 km (3.1 mi) northwest of Melitopol	253♠	5 June 1944	15:20! (Note: According to Barbas claimed at 15:15, while Mathews and Foreman state at 15:50.)	LaGG	PQ 24 Ost 78582; PQ 78562; 15 km (9.3 mi) southwest of Țuțora
147	29 October 1943	08:50	La-7*	PQ 34 Ost 38151; 10 km (6.2 mi) southwest of Kryvyi Rih	254♠	5 June 1944	18:07	LaGG	PQ 24 Ost 78562; 15 km (9.3 mi) southwest of Țuțora
148	29 October 1943	11:05	P-39	PQ 34 Ost 39499; PQ 29494 vicinity of Nova Praha	255♠	5 June 1944	18:35	P-39	PQ 24 Ost 78674; 8 km (5.0 mi) north of Iași
149	7 December 1943	13:46	LaGG-3* (Note: According to Barbas claimed as a Lavochkin-Gorbunov-Gudkov aircraft, while Mathews and Foreman list this claim as a Lavochkin La-7.)	south-southeast of Dnjeprovka south of Durgrowka	256♠	5 June 1944	18:40	P-39	PQ 24 Ost 78583; 25 km (16 mi) northwest of Iași
150	13 December 1943	10:10	LaGG-3*	south of Snihurivka	257♠	6 June 1944	15:25	La-5*	PQ 24 Ost 78598; 15 km (9.3 mi) northwest of Iași
151	15 December 1943	12:32	LaGG-3*	northwest of Chervonovershka	258♠	6 June 1944	15:30	La-5*	PQ 24 Ost 78591; 15 km (9.3 mi) northwest of Iași
152	15 December 1943	12:45	LaGG-3*	north of Werbljushka	259♠	6 June 1944	19:15	P-39	PQ 24 Ost 78582; PQ 76582; 20 km (12 mi) north of Silistra
153	15 December 1943	14:16	LaGG-3*	north-northeast of Chervonovershka; Chervonovershka	260♠	6 June 1944	19:25	P-39	PQ 24 Ost 78569; PQ 78579; 40 km (25 mi) west-northwest of Iași
154	17 December 1943	14:10	LaGG-3*	east of Novgorotka	261♠	6 June 1944	19:35	P-39	PQ 24 Ost 78728; 20 km (12 mi) west-northwest of Iași
155	17 December 1943	14:20	P-39	northeast of Novgorotka	262	12 June 1944	14:00	P-39	PQ 24 Ost 78862; 25 km (16 mi) east of Iași
156	17 December 1943	14:24	P-39	south of Werbljushka	263	12 June 1944	14:05	P-39	PQ 24 Ost 78831; 25 km (16 mi) east-northeast of Iași
157	20 December 1943	09:02	LaGG-3	northeast of Verkhniy	264	24 June 1944	09:50	P-51	PQ 24 Ost 65134; PQ 65137; Over the sea, south of Cape-Takhil
158	20 December 1943	12:13	LaGG-3*	west of Tomakivka	265	27 June 1944	18:10	LaGG	PQ 25 Ost 85245; PQ 85229 vicinity of Krepostnaya
159	20 December 1943	12:15! (Note: According to both Barbas, and Mathews and Foreman claimed at 12:13.)	LaGG-3*	northwest of Verkhniy	266	27 June 1944	18:15	LaGG	PQ 25 Ost 85242; PQ 85245 vicinity of Krasny
160	3 January 1944	12:10	LaGG	PQ 34 Ost 38893; 40 km (25 mi) northeast of Beryslav	267	1 July 1944	17:30	LaGG	PQ 25 Ost 94173 vicinity of Parafyanovo
161	7 January 1944	14:20	LaGG	PQ 34 Ost 29361; PQ 29363 vicinity of Nova Praha	268	1 July 1944	17:32	LaGG	PQ 25 Ost 94179 vicinity of Parafyanovo
162	7 January 1944	14:25	LaGG*	PQ 34 Ost 29344; 15 km (9.3 mi) northwest of Kirovograd	269	15 August 1944	11:43	La-5	PQ 24 Ost 01633
163	8 January 1944	14:15	P-39	PQ 34 Ost 29371; PQ 29372; 15 km (9.3 mi) west of Kirovograd	270	15 August 1944	11:45	LaGG	PQ 24 Ost 01663; PQ 01633
164	8 January 1944	14:20	P-39	PQ 34 Ost 29352; 10 km (6.2 mi) north of Kirovograd	271	17 August 1944	12:25	P-39	PQ 24 Ost 11267; 40 km (25 mi) east-southeast of Ostrowiec
165	8 January 1944	14:30	P-39	PQ 34 Ost 29552; 20 km (12 mi) south of Kirovograd	272	17 August 1944	12:30	P-39	PQ 25 Ost 11273; 15 km (9.3 mi) east-southeast of Opatów
166	16 January 1944	10:15	P-39	PQ 34 Ost 29343; 15 km (9.3 mi) northwest of Kirovograd	273	17 August 1944	15:17	LaGG	PQ 25 Ost 11277; 15 km (9.3 mi) east-southeast of Opatów
167	16 January 1944	10:26	LaGG*	PQ 34 Ost 19464; 25 km (16 mi) west-northwest of Kirovograd	274	18 August 1944	16:27	LaGG	PQ 25 Ost 11272; 15 km (9.3 mi) east-southeast of Opatów
168	16 January 1944	10:47	LaGG*	PQ 34 Ost 19492; 25 km (16 mi) west of Kirovograd	275	20 August 1944	12:00	LaGG*	PQ 25 Ost 11779; 10 km (6.2 mi) east of Tarnów
169	17 January 1944	10:47! (Note: According to both Barbas, and Mathews and Foreman claimed at 09:44.)	LaGG	PQ 34 Ost 19492; PQ 29512; 10 km (6.2 mi) west of Alexandrovsk	276	20 August 1944	12:03	LaGG*	PQ 25 Ost 11757; 20 km (12 mi) south-southwest of Mielec
170	17 January 1944	14:15! (Note: According to both Barbas, and Mathews and Foreman claimed at 12:19.)	LaGG	PQ 34 Ost 29521 vicinity of Alexandrovsk	277	20 August 1944	12:10	LaGG*	PQ 25 Ost 11724; 15 km (9.3 mi) southwest of Mielec
171	17 January 1944	14:20! (Note: According to Barbas, and Mathews and Foreman claimed at 12:24.)	Pe-2	PQ 34 Ost 19492; 25 km (16 mi) west of Kirovograd	278♠	22 August 1944	12:20	P-39	PQ 25 Ost 11274; 5 km (3.1 mi) southwest of Sobótka
172	17 January 1944	14:30! (Note: According to both Barbas, and Mathews and Foreman claimed at 14:06.)	LaGG	PQ 34 Ost 29341; 15 km (9.3 mi) northwest of Kirovograd	279♠	22 August 1944	12:30	P-39	PQ 25 Ost 11353; PQ 11335; 20 km (12 mi) south of Opatów
173	23 January 1944	11:30	LaGG*	PQ 34 Ost 29342; 15 km (9.3 mi) northwest of Kirovograd	280♠	22 August 1944	12:31	P-39	PQ 25 Ost 11339; 20 km (12 mi) south of Opatów
174	23 January 1944	13:20	LaGG*	PQ 34 Ost 19262; 20 km (12 mi) southwest of Alexandrovsk	281♠	22 August 1944	15:17	P-39	PQ 25 Ost 11411; 15 km (9.3 mi) west of Sandomierz
175	23 January 1944	13:25	LaGG*	PQ 34 Ost 19264; 20 km (12 mi) southwest of Alexandrovsk	282♠	22 August 1944	15:22	P-39	PQ 25 Ost 11271; 15 km (9.3 mi) east-southeast of Opatów
176	23 January 1944	13:45	LaGG*	PQ 34 Ost 19293; 25 km (16 mi) south-southwest of Alexandrovsk	283♠	23 August 1944	14:15	LaGG	PQ 25 Ost 11411; 15 km (9.3 mi) west of Sandomierz
177	24 January 1944	10:25	LaGG*	PQ 34 Ost 19262; 20 km (12 mi) southwest of Alexandrovsk	284♠	23 August 1944	14:18	LaGG	PQ 25 Ost 11413; 15 km (9.3 mi) west of Sandomierz
178♠	30 January 1944	10:05	LaGG	PQ 34 Ost 19274; 25 km (16 mi) south-southeast of Signajewka	285♠	23 August 1944	14:20	LaGG	PQ 25 Ost 11278; 15 km (9.3 mi) east-southeast of Opatów
179♠	30 January 1944	10:10	LaGG*	PQ 34 Ost 19283; 40 km (25 mi) southwest of Alexandrovsk	286♠	23 August 1944	17:10	LaGG	PQ 25 Ost 11363; 20 km (12 mi) south of Opatów
180♠	30 January 1944	12:25	LaGG	PQ 34 Ost 19241; 20 km (12 mi) south-southeast of Signajewka	287♠	23 August 1944	17:12	LaGG	PQ 25 Ost 11333; 15 km (9.3 mi) south of Opatów
181♠	30 January 1944	12:30	LaGG	PQ 34 Ost 19243; 20 km (12 mi) south-southeast of Signajewka	288♠	23 August 1944	17:15	LaGG	PQ 25 Ost 11412; 15 km (9.3 mi) west of Sandomierz
182♠	30 January 1944	14:25	LaGG	PQ 34 Ost 19261; 20 km (12 mi) southwest of Alexandrovsk	289♠	23 August 1944	17:17	LaGG	PQ 25 Ost 11421 vicinity of Sandomierz
183♠	30 January 1944	14:30	LaGG*	PQ 34 Ost 19432; 25 km (16 mi) northwest of Kirovograd	290♠	23 August 1944	17:30	LaGG*	PQ 25 Ost 11444; 15 km (9.3 mi) southwest of Sandomierz
184	31 January 1944	11:10	LaGG*	PQ 34 Ost 19241; 20 km (12 mi) south-southeast of Signajewka	291♠	24 August 1944	13:15	LaGG	PQ 25 Ost 11417; 15 km (9.3 mi) west of Sandomierz
185	31 January 1944	11:15	LaGG*	PQ 34 Ost 19132; 10 km (6.2 mi) south-southwest of Signajewka	292♠	24 August 1944	13:18	LaGG	PQ 25 Ost 11416; 15 km (9.3 mi) west of Sandomierz
186♠	1 February 1944	08:10	LaGG	PQ 34 Ost 19284; 40 km (25 mi) southwest of Alexandrovsk	293♠	24 August 1944	13:19	LaGG	PQ 25 Ost 11421 vicinity of Sandomierz
187♠	1 February 1944	10:00	LaGG	PQ 34 Ost 19162; 25 km (16 mi) south of Signajewka	294♠	24 August 1944	13:25	LaGG	PQ 25 Ost 11427 vicinity of Sandomierz
188♠	1 February 1944	10:05	LaGG	PQ 34 Ost 19241; 20 km (12 mi) south-southeast of Signajewka	295♠	24 August 1944	13:27	LaGG	PQ 25 Ost 11419; 15 km (9.3 mi) west of Sandomierz
189♠	1 February 1944	12:00	LaGG	PQ 19124; 20 km (12 mi) southwest of Signajewka	296♠	24 August 1944	13:40	P-39	PQ 25 Ost 11443; 15 km (9.3 mi) southwest of Sandomierz
190♠	1 February 1944	12:02	LaGG	PQ 19134; 10 km (6.2 mi) south-southwest of Signajewka	297♠	24 August 1944	16:00	LaGG*	PQ 25 Ost 11335; 15 km (9.3 mi) south of Opatów
191	3 February 1944	13:40	LaGG*	PQ 34 Ost 19152; 25 km (16 mi) south-southwest of Signajewka	298♠	24 August 1944	16:03	LaGG*	PQ 25 Ost 11363; 20 km (12 mi) south of Opatów
192	4 February 1944	11:40	P-39	PQ 34 Ost 10783; 15 km (9.3 mi) west of Signajewka	299♠	24 August 1944	16:06	P-39	PQ 25 Ost 11447; 15 km (9.3 mi) southwest of Sandomierz
193♠	26 February 1944	09:08	P-39	PQ 34 Ost 29381 vicinity of Kirovograd	300♠	24 August 1944	16:10	P-39	PQ 25 Ost 11441; 15 km (9.3 mi) southwest of Sandomierz
194♠	26 February 1944	09:16	P-39	PQ 34 Ost 29384 vicinity of Kirovograd	301♠	24 August 1944	16:20	LaGG	PQ 25 Ost 11422 vicinity of Sandomierz
195♠	26 February 1944	11:45	P-39	PQ 34 Ost 29524 vicinity of Alexandrovsk	302	25 August 1944	13:27	La-5*	PQ 25 Ost 01663
196♠	26 February 1944	11:48	P-39	PQ 34 Ost 29521 vicinity of Alexandrovsk	303	27 August 1944	18:00	P-39	PQ 25 Ost 11353; 20 km (12 mi) south-southwest of Opatów
197♠	26 February 1944	11:53	P-39	PQ 34 Ost 29514; 10 km (6.2 mi) west of Alexandrovsk					
On 30 September 1944, Hartmann was transferred and tasked with creation and leadership of a newly formed 4. Staffel of JG 52.
Claims with 4. Staffel of Jagdgeschwader 52
Claim	Date	Time	Type	Location	Claim	Date	Time	Type	Location
304	27 October 1944	10:16	Yak-9	PQ 24 Ost 18265; PQ 18255 vicinity of Nyíregyháza	320♠	22 November 1944	11:40	Yak-9	PQ 98453; 20 km (12 mi) southwest of Gyöngyös
— ? (Note: This unconfirmed claim is not listed by Prien, Stemmer, Balke and Bock, nor by Mathews and Foreman.)	27 October 1944	—	Il-2		321♠	22 November 1944	11:45	La-5	PQ 98452; 20 km (12 mi) southwest of Gyöngyös
305	31 October 1944	15:30	Yak-7	PQ 14 Ost 98794; PQ 98799; 30 km (19 mi) west-northwest of Nagykőrös	322♠	22 November 1944	—	Il-2	
306	1 November 1944	14:35	La-5	PQ 14 Ost 98832; PQ 98836; 25 km (16 mi) northwest of Szolnok	323♠	22 November 1944	—	Yak-3* (Note: According to Mathews and Foreman claimed as an Ilyushin Il-2.)	
307	7 November 1944	13:35	Yak-7	PQ 14 Ost 98563; 30 km (19 mi) east of Budapest	324♠	23 November 1944	—	Yak-3	
308	13 November 1944	14:10	Yak-9	PQ 14 Ost 9866	325♠	23 November 1944	—	Yak-9	
309	13 November 1944	14:15	Yak-9	PQ 14 Ost 9866	326♠	23 November 1944	—	Yak-9	
310	13 November 1944	14:25	Yak-9	PQ 24 Ost 0857	327♠	23 November 1944	—	Yak-9	
311	13 November 1944	14:30	Yak-9	PQ 14 Ost 98631 southeast of Jászberény	328♠	23 November 1944	—	Yak-9	
312	14 November 1944	11:35	La-5	PQ 98494 southeast of Jászberény	329? (Note: This claim is not listed by Barbas.)	24 November 1944	—	Yak-9	
313	14 November 1944	11:45	LaGG-5	PQ 98661; 35 km (22 mi) south-southwest of Szolnok	330?	24 November 1944	—	Il-2	
314	16 November 1944	08:45	Yak-9	PQ 98368	331?	24 November 1944	—	Yak-9	
315	16 November 1944	08:50	Yak-9	PQ 98487 vicinity of Jászberény	332?	24 November 1944	—	Yak-9	
316	17 November 1944	14:25	Boston	PQ 98584; 25 km (16 mi) southeast of Budapest	333	5 December 1944	13:20	La-5	PQ 98419 southeast of Hatvan
317?	21 November 1944	—	La-5		334	5 December 1944	13:25	La-5	PQ 98278
318♠	22 November 1944	—	Il-2		335	9 December 1944	13:10	Yak-9	PQ 88683; 30 km (19 mi) southwest of Budapest
319♠	22 November 1944	—	Il-2		336	9 December 1944	13:20	Yak-9	PQ 88694; 20 km (12 mi) southwest of Budapest
From 1–14 February, Hartmann briefly led I. Gruppe (1st group) of Jagdgeschwader 53 as acting Gruppenkommandeur (group commander). According to Barbas, Hartmann claimed aerial victories 332 to 337 with I./JG 52 in February 1945.
Claims with I. Gruppe of Jagdgeschwader 53
Claim	Date	Time	Type	Location	Claim	Date	Time	Type	Location
337	4 February 1945	—	Yak-9						
On 1 February, Hartmann was appointed Gruppenkommandeur of I./JG 52.
Claims with I. Gruppe of Jagdgeschwader 52
Claim	Date	Time	Type	Location	Claim	Date	Time	Type	Location
338	20 February 1945	—	P-39		346	16 March 1945	—	unknown	
339	20 February 1945	—	La-5		347	18+ March 1945 (Note: According to Mathews and Foreman after 18 March 1945.)	—	P-51	
340	6 March 1945	—	La-5	vicinity of Opole-Brzeg	348	10 April 1945	—	B-26* (Note: According to Mathews and Foreman claimed as a North American B-25 Mitchell aircraft.)	
341	6 March 1945	—	Yak-9	vicinity of Opole-Brzeg	349	11 April 1945	—	Yak-3	
342	7 March 1945	—	Yak-9	vicinity of Wrocław-Brzeg	350	17 April 1945	—	Yak-9	
343	7 March 1945	—	Yak-9	vicinity of Wrocław-Brzeg	351	25 April 1945	—	P-39	
344	9 March 1945	—	Yak-9		352	8 May 1945	08:30–09:20	Yak-9	city center of Brno
345	11 March 1945	—	Yak-9						
