= List of aerial victories claimed by Alfred Grislawski =

German fighter ace's wins

Alfred Grislawski (2 November 1919 – 19 September 2003) was a German Luftwaffe fighter ace and recipient of the Knight's Cross of the Iron Cross with Oak Leaves during World War II. He was credited with 133 victories claimed in over 800 combat missions. (Note: Grislawski was officially credited with 133 aerial victories. Supposedly his 133rd victory was over a P-38 Lightning shot down on 26 September 1944 at 16:54 south of Dülmen. Grislawski himself denied that he shot down any enemy aircraft on that date, or even having made such a claim.) He recorded 24 victories over the Western Front, including 18 United States Army Air Forces (USAAF) four–engine bombers. Of his 109 claims recorded over the Eastern Front, 16 were Il-2 Sturmoviks.

== List of aerial victories claimed ==
According to US historian David T. Zabecki, Grislawski was credited with 132 aerial victories. Spick lists him with 133 aerial victories. Obermaier also lists Grislawski with 133 aerial victories claimed in 795 combat missions, including 175 close air support missions. He claimed 109 victories over the Eastern Front. Of his 24 victories claimed over the Western Front, eighteen were four-engined bombers. Mathews and Foreman, authors of Luftwaffe Aces — Biographies and Victory Claims, researched the German Federal Archives and found records for 127 aerial victory claims, plus one further unconfirmed claim. This figure includes 108 aerial victories on the Eastern Front and 19 on the Western Front, including 14 four-engined bombers

Victory claims were logged to a map-reference (PQ = Planquadrat), for example "PQ 47654". The Luftwaffe grid map (Jägermeldenetz) covered all of Europe, western Russia and North Africa and was composed of rectangles measuring 15 minutes of latitude by 30 minutes of longitude, an area of about 360 square miles (930 km^{2}). These sectors were then subdivided into 36 smaller units to give a location area 3 km × 4 km (1.9 mi × 2.5 mi) in size.

– (dash) indicates unwitnessed aerial victory claims for which Grislawski did not receive credit.
? (question mark) indicates information discrepancies listed by Bergström, Antipov, Sundin, Prien, Stemmer, Rodeike, Bock, Mathews and Foreman.

Claim	Date	Time	Type	Location	Claim	Date	Time	Type	Location
– 9. Staffel of Jagdgeschwader 52 – Operation Barbarossa — 22 June – 5 December 1941
1	1 September 1941	18:15	I-16	30 km (19 mi) northeast of Kremenchuk	5	14 October 1941	07:14	I-16	15 km (9.3 mi) north of Poltava
2	3 October 1941	17:02	I-16	5 km (3.1 mi) north of Kharkov	6	14 October 1941	09:10	Il-2	10 km (6.2 mi) northeast of Oposhchnaya
3	5 October 1941	13:05	I-26 (Yak-1)	25 km (16 mi) northeast of Krasnohrad	7	30 October 1941	09:35	I-153	20 km (12 mi) north of Simferopol
4	6 October 1941	07:55	V-11 (Il-2)	30 km (19 mi) northwest of Kharkov	—	30 October 1941	—	R-Z	
– 9. Staffel of Jagdgeschwader 52 – Eastern Front — 6 December 1941 – 28 April 1942
8	6 December 1941	10:55	I-16	12 km (7.5 mi) west of Krepkaya	13	8 March 1942	11:18	I-26 (Yak-1)	7 km (4.3 mi) southwest of Savyntsi
9	6 December 1941	14:26	I-16	10 km (6.2 mi) west of Azov	14	15 March 1942	16:35	I-26 (Yak-1)	Katowka
10	8 December 1941	09:46	I-5 (R-Z)	20 km (12 mi) east of Taganrog	15	17 March 1942	08:25	R-5	south of Staryi Saltiv
11	8 December 1941	09:54	I-16	20 km (12 mi) east of Krepkaya	16	26 March 1942	15:53	I-61 (MiG-3)	18 km (11 mi) south-southeast of Staryi Saltiv
12	4 January 1942	14:15	R-10 (Seversky)	10 km (6.2 mi) east of Kotschetowka	17	27 March 1942	08:00? (Note: According to Mathews and Foreman claimed at 07:00.)	Pe-2	vicinity of Kharkov
– 9. Staffel of Jagdgeschwader 52 – Eastern Front — 29 April – September 1942
18	29 April 1942	12:45	MiG-1? (Note: According to Mathews and Foreman claimed as a Mikoyan-Gurevich MiG-3.)	vicinity of Zürichtal; Kerch Peninsula	39	26 May 1942	16:09	Pe-2	west of Savintsy
19	30 April 1942	14:15	I-15	10 km (6.2 mi) northeast of Feodosia	40	27 May 1942	11:30	MiG-1	5 km (3.1 mi) north of Izium
20	30 April 1942	14:20	I-15	5 km (3.1 mi) south of Kerch	41	27 May 1942	11:33	MiG-1	3 km (1.9 mi) north of Izium
21	1 May 1942	04:45	MBR-2	10 km (6.2 mi) south of Sedshent (Sidsheut)	42	28 May 1942	14:15	LaGG-3	15 km (9.3 mi) northeast of Izium
22	1 May 1942	04:55	I-26 (Yak-1)	northwest of Arabat Fortress	43? (Note: According to Mathews and Foreman this claim is unconfirmed. This claim is not listed by Bergström, Antipov and Sundin.)	23 June 1942	19:19	MiG-1	3 km (1.9 mi) west of Kupiansk
23	1 May 1942	05:03	I-26 (Yak-1)	Akmonaj	43	4 September 1942	11:20	I-16	PQ 44482 vicinity of Terek
24	1 May 1942	08:09	I-15	vicinity of Ssal	44	5 September 1942	18:25	Douglas DB-7? (Note: According to Mathews and Foreman claimed as a Petlyakov Pe-8 (TB-7).)	PQ 44443, north of Georgjewsk
25	9 May 1942	12:28	I-15	10 km (6.2 mi) east of Sedshent (Sidsheut)	45	6 September 1942	13:35	Boston	PQ 44419
26	9 May 1942	12:33	MiG-1	10 km (6.2 mi) northeast of Sarylar	46	6 September 1942	13:37	Yak-1	PQ 4441
27	14 May 1942	16:45	MiG-1	Kotomlja	47	8 September 1942	13:55	Boston	PQ 44271 south of Mozdok
28	14 May 1942	16:50	MiG-1	Kotowka	48	8 September 1942	13:56	Boston	PQ 44373
29	15 May 1942	05:17	MiG-1	southeast of Staryi Saltiv	49	8 September 1942	13:57	Boston	PQ 44373
30	15 May 1942	16:05	Su-2 (Seversky)	Staryi Saltiv	50	8 September 1942	13:57	Boston	PQ 44323
31	18 May 1942	10:30	MiG-3	5 km (3.1 mi) north of Staryi Saltiv	51	9 September 1942	14:00	MiG-1	PQ 49481; PQ 44481, vicinity of Terek
32	18 May 1942	13:05	MiG-1	vicinity of Lipzy	52	9 September 1942	14:04	LaGG-3	PQ 44442, south of Mozdok; PQ 44453, vicinity of Terek
33	18 May 1942	18:23	Su-2 (Seversky)	10 km (6.2 mi) west of Staryi Saltiv	53	13 September 1942	13:05	LaGG-3	PQ 44539; PQ 44531, vicinity of Terek
34	20 May 1942	16:47	LaGG-3	15 km (9.3 mi) west of Petrovskaya	54	14 September 1942	10:25? (Note: According to Bergström, Antipov and Sundin claimed at 10:35.)	Su-2? (Note: According to Mathews and Foreman claimed as a Polikarpov I-16.)	PQ 44557; PQ 44521, vicinity of Terek
35	22 May 1942	14:30	MiG-1	10 km (6.2 mi) south of Balakleya	55	14 September 1942	14:25? (Note: According to Mathews and Foreman claimed at 10:35 over a Seversky.)	I-16?	PQ 47582; PQ 44562, vicinity of Terek
36	22 May 1942	14:36	MiG-1	5 km (3.1 mi) northwest of Balakleya	56	16 September 1942	06:15	LaGG-3	PQ 44363 vicinity of Terek
37	24 May 1942	17:00	R-10 (Seversky)	25 km (16 mi) east of Slavyansk	57	17 September 1942	14:27	I-16	PQ 54324 vicinity of Terek
38	25 May 1942	19:03	Su-2 (Seversky)	northeast of Petrowskaya	58	17 September 1942	14:28	Su-2 (Seversky)	PQ 54344 vicinity of Terek
– 7. Staffel of Jagdgeschwader 52 – Eastern Front — October 1942 – 3 February 1943
59	4 October 1942	14:35	Boston	PQ 44283; PQ 34283, vicinity of Terek	76	10 December 1942	12:00	Il-2	PQ 44212; PQ 44282, Mozdok – vicinity of Malgobek
60	15 October 1942	12:50	Il-2	PQ 44434 vicinity of Terek	77	10 December 1942	12:02	Il-2	PQ 44293; Mozdok – vicinity of Malgobek
61	2 November 1942	11:38	I-16	PQ 44842 vicinity of Terek	78	10 December 1942	12:04	Il-2	PQ 44434; Mozdok – vicinity of Malgobek
62	2 November 1942	11:40	I-153	PQ 44814 vicinity of Terek	79	12 December 1942	09:00	MiG-1	PQ 44264 vicinity of Terek
63	5 November 1942	08:25	Il-2	PQ 44792 vicinity of Terek	80	12 December 1942	11:22	MiG-1	PQ 44291 vicinity of Terek
64	5 November 1942	08:27	Il-2	PQ 44861 vicinity of Terek	81	12 December 1942	11:25	MiG-1	PQ 54171 vicinity of Terek
65	5 November 1942	12:00	Il-2	PQ 44714; PQ 44754, vicinity of Terek	82	12 December 1942	11:40	I-16	PQ 54313 vicinity of Terek
66	5 November 1942	12:04	Il-2	PQ 44802; PQ 44872, vicinity of Terek	83	13 December 1942	10:53	LaGG-3	PQ 54174; PQ 54171, vicinity of Terek
67	7 November 1942	11:10	Il-2	PQ 44874 vicinity of Terek	84	14 December 1942	11:42	Yak-1	PQ 44293 vicinity of Terek
68	24 November 1942	11:55	LaGG-3	PQ 43131 vicinity of Terek	85	8 January 1943	06:35	LaGG-3	PQ 35714; Black Sea, 55 km (34 mi) southwest of Sevastopol
69	27 November 1942	11:20	Il-2	PQ 44733 vicinity of Terek	86	8 January 1943	06:40	LaGG-3	PQ 35743
70	27 November 1942	11:24	Il-2	PQ 44765 vicinity of Terek	87	9 January 1943	09:20	I-16	PQ 3416
71	29 November 1942	06:50	Pe-2	PQ 35783 vicinity of Terek	88	9 January 1943	13:35	Il-2	PQ 35721
72	5 December 1942	10:29	I-16	PQ 44721 vicinity of Terek	89	16 January 1943	10:15	I-153	PQ 85182 vicinity of Achtyskaja
73	5 December 1942	13:10	Boston	PQ 44792 vicinity of Terek	90	18 January 1943	09:30	I-16	PQ 85282 vicinity of Smolenskaja
74	5 December 1942	13:39	Il-2	PQ 44763 vicinity of Terek	91	18 January 1943	09:35	I-16	PQ 85252 vicinity of Smolenskaja
75	8 December 1942	09:25	MiG-1	PQ 34644; PQ 34694, vicinity of Terek	92	3 February 1943	13:55	Boston	PQ 66313; PQ 06313, Kuban area
– 7. Staffel of Jagdgeschwader 52 – Eastern Front — 4 February – 31 December 1943
93	4 February 1943	07:23? (Note: According to Mathews and Foreman claimed at 08:23.)	MiG-1	PQ 34 Ost 75481 into the Black Sea	102	6 May 1943	14:35	LaGG-3	PQ 34 Ost 75261, southwest of Krymskaja
94	10 February 1943	06:45	Pe-2	PQ 34 Ost 85152 east of Sorin	103	14 May 1943	11:17	DB-3	PQ 34 Ost 7585
95	19 April 1943	11:10	LaGG-3	PQ 34 Ost 75343 south of Tscheshskij	104	28 May 1943	06:25	LaGG	PQ 34 Ost 76864
96	20 April 1943	16:05	LaGG-3	PQ 34 Ost 75422 northwest of Novorossiysk	105	28 May 1943	12:12	LaGG	PQ 34 Ost 76874, north of Krymskaja
97	21 April 1943	05:55	LaGG-3? (Note: According to Mathews and Foreman claimed as a Lavochkin La-5.)	PQ 34 Ost 75474; 5 km (3.1 mi) southeast of Novorossiysk	106	29 May 1943	11:20	LaGG-3	PQ 34 Ost 75232, north of Krymskaja
98	23 April 1943	17:05	LaGG-3	PQ 34 Ost 75451; 8 km (5.0 mi) south of Novorossiysk	107	31 May 1943	09:53	Il-2 m.H. (Note: The "m.H." refers to an Ilyushin Il-2 with rear gunner (mit Heckschütze).)	PQ 34 Ost 75234
99	23 April 1943	17:12	LaGG-3	PQ 34 Ost 75424; 4 km (2.5 mi) east of Novorossiysk	108	3 June 1943	08:55	La-5	PQ 34 Ost 85112, east of Krymskaja
100	27 April 1943	10:50	LaGG-3	PQ 34 Ost 85268	109	3 June 1943	11:02	La-5	PQ 34 Ost 76861 north of Kessjetowa
101	3 May 1943	15:25	Il-2 m.H.	PQ 34 Ost 75262; Kuban area					
– 1. Staffel of Jagdgruppe Süd – Defense of the Reich — August 1943
110	17 August 1943	11:30	B-17	vicinity of Mannheim	111	17 August 1943	15:30	B-17	5 km (3.1 mi) southwest of Rheinböllen
– 1. Staffel of Jagdgeschwader 50 – Defense of the Reich — September – October 1943
112	6 September 1943	10:40	B-17	southeast of Stuttgart	113	14 October 1943	14:38	B-17	5 km (3.1 mi) southwest of Schweinfurt
– 1. Staffel of Jagdgeschwader 1 – Defense of the Reich — November – 31 December 1943
114	29 November 1943	14:45? (Note: According to Bergström, Antipov and Sundin claimed at 14:30.)	B-17	Bremen-Oldenburg area	117	16 December 1943	14:04	B-17	PQ DK-5, off De Koog, Texel
115	1 December 1943	11:45	B-17	Düren-Solingen area	118	20 December 1943	11:50	B-17	PQ CS, Brake-Beverstedt area
116	1 December 1943	11:45	B-17	Düren-Solingen area	119	22 December 1943	14:45	B-17	PQ GO-8, north of Enschede
– 1. Staffel of Jagdgeschwader 1 – Defense of the Reich — January 1944
120	11 January 1944	11:08	B-17	PQ FR-7/8, Dümmer See	121	24 January 1944	11:40	B-17	Aachen-Brussels
– 8. Staffel of Jagdgeschwader 1 – Defense of the Reich — April – June 1944
122	9 April 1944	15:40	B-17	vicinity of Schleswig	124	13 April 1944	15:50~	B-24	
123	9 April 1944	15:40	B-17	vicinity of Schleswig	125	22 April 1944	18:20	P-51	Kassel-Nordenbeck
– 8. Staffel of Jagdgeschwader 1 – Invasion of France — June – August 1944
126	13 July 1944	18:15	Typhoon	PQ 95 Ost S/UU-7, vicinity of Caen	128	19 July 1944	20:32	Typhoon	PQ 95 Ost S/UU-1/2, vicinity of Caen
127	14 July 1944	19:17	P-51	PQ 94 Ost N/AU, south of Caen vicinity of Falaise	129	12 August 1944	14:15	Spitfire	PQ 04 Ost N/BB-9, south of L'Aigle
– 11. Staffel of Jagdgeschwader 53 – Defense of the Reich — July – September 1944
130	unknown	unknown	unknown	unknown	132	12 September 1944	11:10	B-17	PQ DG-EG 34/33, vicinity of Templin-Berlin
131	12 September 1944	11:05	B-17	PQ DG-EG 34/33, vicinity of Templin-Berlin					
– 11. Staffel of Jagdgeschwader 53 – Defense of the Reich — September – December 1944
133?	26 September 1944	16:54	P-38	south of Dülmen					
