= List of aerial victories claimed by Hermann Graf =

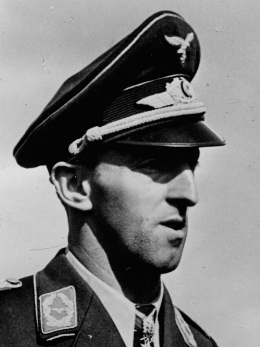
Hermann Graf

Hermann Graf (24 October 1912 – 4 November 1988) was a German Luftwaffe World War II fighter ace. (Note: A flying ace or fighter ace is a military aviator credited with shooting down five or more enemy aircraft during aerial combat.) He served on both the Eastern and Western Fronts. He became the first pilot in aviation history to claim 200 aerial victories—that is, 200 aerial combat encounters resulting in the destruction of the enemy aircraft. In about 830 combat missions, he claimed a total of 212 aerial victories, almost all of which were achieved on the Eastern Front.

== List of aerial victories claimed ==
According to US historian David T. Zabecki, Graf was credited with 212 aerial victories. He claimed these aerial victories in 830 combat missions, 10 on the Western Front which included six four-engined-bombers and one Mosquito, and 202 on the Eastern Front.

Victory claims were logged to a map-reference (PQ = Planquadrat), for example "PQ 85 423". The Luftwaffe grid map (Jägermeldenetz) covered all of Europe, western Russia and North Africa and was composed of rectangles measuring 15 minutes of latitude by 30 minutes of longitude, an area of about 360 square miles (930 km^{2}). These sectors were then subdivided into 36 smaller units to give a location area 3 km × 4 km (1.9 mi × 2.5 mi) in size.

♠ (Ace of spades) indicates those aerial victories which made Graf an "ace-in-a-day", a term which designates a fighter pilot who has shot down five or more airplanes in a single day.
* (asterisk) indicates an Herausschuss (separation shot)—a severely damaged heavy bomber forced to separate from his combat box which was counted as an aerial victory.

Chronicle of aerial victories
Claim	Date	Time	Type	Location	Claim	Date	Time	Type	Location
– 1941 –
1	4 August 1941	6:20	I-16	10 km (6.2 mi) SSE of Kiev	22	8 November 1941	11:58	MiG-3	S of Rostov
2	5 August 1941	6:20	I-16	3 km (1.9 mi) S of Kiev	23	9 November 1941	14:35	I-16	10 km (6.2 mi) E of Shakhty
3	11 August 1941	14:35	MiG-3	2 km (1.2 mi) E of Kaniv	24	11 November 1941	14:35	MiG-3	N of Rovenkiy
4	30 August 1941	8:40	DB-3	of 4 BAK; 60 km (37 mi); NE of Dnipropetrovsk	25	17 November 1941	14:38	I-16	10 km (6.2 mi) E of Rostov
5	6 September 1941	18:23	I-16	25–30 km (16–19 mi) E of Kremenchug	26	20 November 1941	13:52	Su-2	20 km (12 mi) NE of Agrafenovka
6	13 September 1941	10:46	Yak-1	of VVS-ChF; 15 km (9.3 mi); NW of Perekop	27	23 November 1941	13:36	Il-2	of 4 ShAP; S of Rostov
7	24 September 1941	12:10	DB-3	of 52 DBAD; Balakliia	28	29 November 1941	10:21	I-16	10 km (6.2 mi) NNE of Rostov
8	27 September 1941	14:22	DB-3	of 8 BAP; 50 km (31 mi) W of Kharkov	29	29 November 1941	10:27	DB-3	ENE of Rostov
9	3 October 1941	17:00	Yak-1	10 km (6.2 mi) E of Kharkov	30	29 November 1941	13:07	I-16	S of Bataysk
10	3 October 1941	17:05	I-16	E of Kharkov	31	2 December 1941	12:19	I-16	20 km (12 mi) S of Taganrog
11	11 October 1941	7:10	SB-2	10 km (6.2 mi) E of Lozova	32	6 December 1941	12:52	Il-2	of 4 ShAP; E of Lysogorskaya
12	11 October 1941	7:15	I-153	20 km (12 mi) E of Lozova	33	6 December 1941	14:25	I-16	W of Azov
13	14 October 1941	16:10	Yak-1	10 km (6.2 mi) N of Valki	34	6 December 1941	14:32	I-16	E of Azov
14	14 October 1941	16:13	Yak-1	15 km (9.3 mi) N of Valki	35	8 December 1941	9:43	R-Z	20 km (12 mi) E of Taganrog
15	24 October 1941	12:50	MiG-3	of VVS-ChF; Boysovka	36	8 December 1941	9:44	R-Z	25 km (16 mi) E of Taganrog
16	24 October 1941	12:52	MiG-3	of VVS-ChF; Boysovka	37	8 December 1941	9:52	I-16	SW of Rabovka
17	25 October 1941	15:21	Yak-1 (MiG-3 claimed)	Ltn Mikhail Avdeyev (17v) of 32 IAP; Aibary	38	27 December 1941	12:01	I-16	of 88 IAP; 30 km (19 mi) E of Taganrog
18	27 October 1941	15:38	Yak-1 (MiG-3 claimed)	of VVS-ChF; 10 km (6.2 mi); S of Yushno	39	27 December 1941	12:05	I-16	of 88 IAP; 10 km (6.2 mi) E of Asov
19	28 October 1941	10:02	Yak-1 (MiG-3 claimed)	of VVS-ChF; SE of Aibary	40	27 December 1941	14:25	I-16	NE of Golodayevka
20	28 October 1941	10:03	R-5	of VVS-ChF; SE of Aibary	41	27 December 1941	14:30	SB-2	NE of Golodayevka
21	1 November 1941	16:15	Yak-1 (MiG-3 claimed)	of 32 IAP, VVS-ChF; N of Sevastopol	42	28 December 1941	13:32	Yak-1	20 km (12 mi) SW of Taganrog
– 1942 –
43	7 January 1942	14:50	I-16	Sansnoye	123	17 August 1942	11:43	I-153	of 238 ShAD; Kuban area, PQ 85 423
44	7 January 1942	14:55	I-16	Novaya Slobodka	124	17 August 1942	15:36	I-153	of 238 ShAD; Kuban area, PQ 85 433
45	8 January 1942	11:25	Unknown	E of Prilepiy	125	17 August 1942	15:48	I-153	of 238 ShAD; 25 km (16 mi); NE of Tuapse, PQ 95 581
46	25 January 1942	15:42	I-16	10 km (6.2 mi) E of Izyum	126	18 August 1942	16:42	I-153	of 238 ShAD; 25 km (16 mi); Severskaya, PQ 85 253
47	3 February 1942	9:35	Su-2	of 135 BBAP?; Nuvo	127	18 August 1942	16:43	R-5	of 763 LBAP; 40 km (25 mi); NNW of Tuapse, PQ 85 494
48	23 March 1942	13:06	Yak-1	8 km (5.0 mi) SE of Gniliza	128	22 August 1942	13:55	Il-2	Don River, 20 km (12 mi); WNW of Kotluban, PQ 30 892
49	23 March 1942	13:14	MiG-3	3 km (1.9 mi) SE of Burluk	129	22 August 1942	14:03	Yak-1	20 km (12 mi) NW of Stalingrad; PQ 49 154
50	23 March 1942	17:26	Su-2	of 135 BBAP?; E of Kotovka	130	23 August 1942	7:22	LaGG-3	20 km (12 mi) SW of Kotluban; PQ 49 413
51	25 March 1942	6:25	Yak-1	15 km (9.3 mi) E of Staryy Saltov	131	23 August 1942	7:27	LaGG-3	Stalingrad, PQ 49 194
52	27 March 1942	10:11	Yak-1	15 km (9.3 mi) E of Volchansk	132	23 August 1942	13:28	LaGG-3	northern Stalingrad, PQ 49 271
53	27 March 1942	17:18	MiG-3	10 km (6.2 mi) NE of Burluk	133	23 August 1942	13:31	LaGG-3	Stalingrad, PQ 49 194
54	28 March 1942	5:53	I-16	3 km (1.9 mi) W of Burluk	134	24 August 1942	9:28	Yak-1 (Yak-7 claimed)	of 512 IAP; 8 km (5.0 mi); E of Stalingrad, PQ 49 421
55	28 March 1942	6:18	Yak-1	3 km (1.9 mi) W of Kotovka	135	24 August 1942	9:58	Il-2	13 km (8.1 mi) N of Stalingrad; PQ 49 243
56	28 March 1942	17:08	MiG-3	5 km (3.1 mi) E of Staryy Saltov	136	25 August 1942	11:51	LaGG-3	5 km (3.1 mi) E of Stalingrad; PQ 49 412
57	28 March 1942	17:41	I-16	Gniliza	137	25 August 1942	17:27	LaGG-3	5 km (3.1 mi) E of Stalingrad; PQ 49 412
58	30 March 1942	12:05	MiG-3	15 km (9.3 mi) W of Burluk	138	29 August 1942	14:22	LaGG-3	24 km (15 mi) E of Stalingrad; PQ 59 173
59	6 April 1942	6:02	I-16	2 km (1.2 mi) NE of Staryy Saltov	139	30 August 1942	16:52	Pe-2	of 270 BAD; 10 km (6.2 mi); SW of Stalingrad, PQ 49 382
60	6 April 1942	6:04	I-16	10 km (6.2 mi) E of Staryy Saltov	140	30 August 1942	17:07	Il-2	5 km (3.1 mi) SW of Stalingrad; PQ 49 361
61	29 April 1942	—	Yak-1	of 247 IAP; Kerch Peninsula	141♠	2 September 1942	9:12	P-40	of 731 IAP; southern Stalingrad; PQ 49 362
62	29 April 1942	—	Yak-1?	of 247 IAP; Kerch Peninsula	142♠	2 September 1942	9:15	Il-2	5 km (3.1 mi) SE of Stalingrad; PQ 49 441
63	29 April 1942	—	Yak-1?	of 247 IAP; Kerch Peninsula	143♠	2 September 1942	13:32	Pe-8	30 km (19 mi) ENE of Stalingrad; PQ 59 143
64♠	30 April 1942	—	Unknown	Kerch Peninsula	144♠	2 September 1942	17:05	LaGG-3	5 km (3.1 mi) SW of Stalingrad; PQ 49 361
65♠	30 April 1942	—	I-16	May Kartuzov, of 36 IAP; Kerch Peninsula	145♠	2 September 1942	17:11	P-40	of 731 IAP; 12 km (7.5 mi); SE of Stalingrad, PQ 49 453
66♠	30 April 1942	—	Unknown	Kerch Peninsula	146	3 September 1942	13:48	LaGG-3	35 km (22 mi) ENE of Stalingrad; PQ 40 872
67♠	30 April 1942	16:42	Unknown	Kerch Peninsula	147	3 September 1942	13:51	Yak-1	50 km (31 mi) ENE of Stalingrad; PQ 40 852
68♠	30 April 1942	16:47	Unknown	Kerch Peninsula	148	3 September 1942	17:06	Yak-1	35 km (22 mi) N of Stalingrad; PQ 40 871
69♠	30 April 1942	16:50	Unknown	Kerch Peninsula	149	3 September 1942	17:13	Yak-1	36 km (22 mi) NE of Stalingrad; PQ 49 234
70♠	2 May 1942	c. 4:00	I-16	Kerch Peninsula	150	4 September 1942	10:12	Yak-1	of 220 IAD; 20 km (12 mi); N of Stalingrad, PQ 49 241
71♠	2 May 1942	c. 4:00	I-16	Kerch Peninsula	151	5 September 1942	16:58	I-153	of 629 IAP; 40 km (25 mi); NNE of Stalingrad, PQ 40 881
72♠	2 May 1942	c. 4:00	I-16	Kerch Peninsula	152	6 September 1942	13:21	Il-2	18 km (11 mi) NW of Stalingrad; PQ 49 163
73♠	2 May 1942	11:15	I-153	of 214 ShAP; Kerch Peninsula	153	6 September 1942	13:23	Yak-1	28 km (17 mi) NW of Stalingrad; PQ 49 124
74♠	2 May 1942	11:15	Unknown	Kerch Peninsula	154	6 September 1942	13:27	Yak-1	4 km (2.5 mi) ENE of Kotluban; PQ 40 784
75♠	2 May 1942	—	Unknown	Kerch Peninsula	155	7 September 1942	16:05	Yak-1	northern Stalingrad, PQ 49 271
76♠	2 May 1942	—	Unknown	Kerch Peninsula	156	8 September 1942	11:28	La-5	of 27 IAP; 4 km (2.5 mi); NW of Stalingrad, PQ 49 192
77	3 May 1942	—	Unknown	Crimea	157	8 September 1942	11:29	Il-2	of 206 ShAD; Stalingrad, PQ 49 194
78	5 May 1942	—	Unknown	Crimea	158	8 September 1942	11:35	La-5	of 27 IAP; Volga River, 5 km (3.1 mi); NE of Stalingrad, PQ 49 253
79♠	8 May 1942	—	MiG-3	Crimea	159	9 September 1942	13:21	La-5	of 27 IAP; 4 km (2.5 mi); E of Stalingrad, PQ 49 414
80♠	8 May 1942	10:58	Unknown	Crimea	160	9 September 1942	13:34	La-5	of 27 IAP; Volga River, 7 km (4.3 mi); SE of Stalingrad, PQ 49 444
81♠	8 May 1942	11:02	Unknown	Crimea	161	10 September 1942	15:34	La-5	of 287 IAD; Volga River, 7 km (4.3 mi); SE of Stalingrad, PQ 49 444
82♠	8 May 1942	11:07	Unknown	Crimea	162	10 September 1942	15:35	La-5	of 287 IAD; Volga River, 7 km (4.3 mi); SE of Stalingrad, PQ 49 444
83♠	8 May 1942	—	I-16	Kerch Peninsula	163	11 September 1942	15:58	Pe-2	of 270 BAD; 3 km (1.9 mi); N of Kotluban, PQ 40 781
84♠	8 May 1942	13:32	Unknown	Kerch Peninsula	164	11 September 1942	16:09	P-40	of 731 IAP; 35 km (22 mi); ENE of Stalingrad, PQ 40 884
85♠	8 May 1942	17:28	MiG-3	Crimea	165	12 September 1942	16:47	I-153	of 629 IAP; 5 km (3.1 mi); E of Stalingrad, PQ 49 412
86	9 May 1942	—	Unknown	Crimea	166	12 September 1942	17:13	I-153	of 629 IAP; 20 km (12 mi); NW of Stalingrad, PQ 49 161
87	9 May 1942	—	Unknown	Crimea	167	14 September 1942	8:00	I-16	of 629 IAP; 20 km (12 mi); SE of Stalingrad, PQ 49 453
88	11 May 1942	—	I-16	Kerch Peninsula	168	14 September 1942	8:04	I-16	of 629 IAP; 20 km (12 mi); ESE of Stalingrad, PQ 49 424
89	11 May 1942	—	I-16	Kerch Peninsula	169	14 September 1942	8:09	Yak-1	Stalingrad, PQ 49 411
90	12 May 1942	—	Unknown	Zürichtal to Kharkiv transfer flight	170	15 September 1942	6:35	I-16	St.Lt. Nikolay Lysenko of 629 IAP; 12 km (7.5 mi) E of Stalingrad, PQ 49 423
91♠	13 May 1942	~11.30	Unknown	E of Kharkiv	171	15 September 1942	6:39	I-153	of 629 IAP; 20 km (12 mi); SE of Stalingrad, PQ 49 453
92♠	13 May 1942	~11.30	Unknown	E of Kharkiv	172	15 September 1942	7:05	LaGG-3	5 km (3.1 mi) NE of Stalingrad; PQ 49 272
93♠	13 May 1942	~11.30	Unknown	E of Kharkiv	173	16 September 1942	7:35	Su-2	of 270 BAD; 5 km (3.1 mi); N of Stalingrad, PQ 49 271
94♠	13 May 1942	~11.30	Unknown	E of Kharkiv	174	16 September 1942	7:39	P-40	of 731 IAP; 40 km (25 mi); NE of Stalingrad, PQ 40 882
95♠	13 May 1942	—	Unknown	Kharkiv area	175	17 September 1942	8:48	Yak-1	8 km (5.0 mi) NE of Kotluban, PQ 40 782
96♠	13 May 1942	—	Unknown	Kharkiv area	176	17 September 1942	8:52	Yak-1	35 km (22 mi) NNE of Stalingrad, PQ 40 872
97♠	14 May 1942	—	Unknown	Kharkiv area	177	17 September 1942	14:36	LaGG-3	40 km (25 mi) NE of Stalingrad, PQ 59 111
98♠	14 May 1942	—	Su-2	of 13 GBAP; Kharkiv area	178	18 September 1942	11:57	LaGG-3	4 km (2.5 mi) S of Kotluban, PQ 49 124
99♠	14 May 1942	—	Su-2	of 13 GBAP; Kharkiv area	179	18 September 1942	11:59	LaGG-3	2 km (1.2 mi) SW of Kotluban, PQ 49 121
100♠	14 May 1942	—	Yak-1? (MiG-3 claimed)	Staryy Saltov-Kotovka	180	18 September 1942	12:12	Il-2	of 228 ShAD?; 24 km (15 mi); NNW of Stalingrad, PQ 49 134
101♠	14 May 1942	16:45	Yak-1? (MiG-3 claimed)	Staryy Saltov-Kotovka	181	20 September 1942	8:20	LaGG-3	2 km (1.2 mi) NE of Kotluban, PQ 40 784
102♠	14 May 1942	16:45	Yak-1? (MiG-3 claimed)	Staryy Saltov-Kotovka	182	21 September 1942	11:32	Yak-1	12 km (7.5 mi) SSW of Kotluban, PQ 49 151
103♠	14 May 1942	16:45	Yak-1? (MiG-3 claimed)	Staryy Saltov-Kotovka	183	21 September 1942	11:40	Yak-1	16 km (9.9 mi) E of Kotluban, PQ 49 132
104♠	14 May 1942	16:45	Yak-1? (MiG-3 claimed)	Staryy Saltov-Kotovka	184	21 September 1942	16:24	Il-2	5 km (3.1 mi) E of Stalingrad, PQ 49 412
105	15 May 1942	—	Unknown	Kharkiv area	185	21 September 1942	17:02	Yak-1	14 km (8.7 mi) E of Stalingrad, PQ 49 421
106	20 May 1942	17:37	Pe-3	of 99 BAP?; Kharkiv area	186	22 September 1942	11:20	I-16	of 629 IAP; northern Stalingrad, PQ 49 272
107	21 May 1942	—	MiG-3	SE of Kharkiv	187	22 September 1942	16:45	Yak-1	35 km (22 mi) NE of Stalingrad, PQ 49 261
108	23 May 1942	16:28	I-16	Savintsy	188♠	23 September 1942	10:42	Yak-1	Volga River, E of Stalingrad, PQ 49 274
109	30 June 1942	—	Unknown	over Kharkiv-Rogan	189♠	23 September 1942	11:03	Il-2	8 km (5.0 mi) ESE of Kotluban, PQ 49 131
110	30 June 1942	—	Unknown	Kharkiv area	190♠	23 September 1942	11:06	LaGG-3	16 km (9.9 mi) ENE of Kotluban, PQ 40 792
111	30 June 1942	—	Unknown	Kharkiv area	191♠	23 September 1942	11:07	LaGG-3	70 km (43 mi) S of Stalingrad, PQ 49 764
112	3 August 1942	18:35	Il-2	of 7 GShAP; Caucasus area	192♠	23 September 1942	14:30	Yak-1	24 km (15 mi) NNW of Stalingrad, PQ 49 134
113	5 August 1942	9:37	LaGG-3	Caucasus area	193♠	23 September 1942	14:31	Su-2	of 270 BAD; 27 km (17 mi); NNW of Stalingrad, PQ 49 132
114	12 August 1942	14:32	Yak-1	Kuban area; PQ 86 754	194♠	23 September 1942	14:33	Su-2	of 270 BAD; 16 km (9.9 mi); E of Kotluban, PQ 40 794
115	13 August 1942	15:38	I-16	Kuban area; PQ 85 123	195♠	23 September 1942	16:37	Yak-1	4 km (2.5 mi)NE of Kotluban, PQ 40 782
116	14 August 1942	10:14	I-16	5 km (3.1 mi) SE of Krasnodar; PQ 95 112	196♠	23 September 1942	16:42	Yak-1	8 km (5.0 mi) NE of Kotluban, PQ 40 763
117	14 August 1942	10:20	I-16	5 km (3.1 mi) S of Krasnodar; PQ 95 113	197♠	23 September 1942	16:55	LaGG-3	14 km (8.7 mi) E of Stalingrad, PQ 49 423
118	14 August 1942	13:37	Yak-1	10 km (6.2 mi) SSW of Krasnodar; PQ 85 263	198	25 September 1942	14:41	La-5	of 287 IAD; 45 km (28 mi); ENE of Stalingrad, PQ 59 144
119	14 August 1942	13:52	Hurricane	10 km (6.2 mi) SW of Krasnodar; PQ 85 224	199	25 September 1942	14:46	La-5	of 287 IAD; 16 km (9.9 mi); E of Stalingrad, PQ 49 284
120	14 August 1942	13:57	LaGG-3	30 km (19 mi) SSW of Krasnodar; PQ 85 241	200	26 September 1942	8:53	I-153	of 629 IAP; 30 km (19 mi); E of Stalingrad, PQ 49 294
121	15 August 1942	16:41	Yak-1	20 km (12 mi) S of Krasnodar; PQ 95 174	201	26 September 1942	16:42	LaGG-3	27 km (17 mi) N of Stalingrad, PQ 49 211
122	16 August 1942	16:54	I-16	35 km (22 mi) SSW of Krasnodar; PQ 85 314	202	26 September 1942	16:58	Yak-1	16 km (9.9 mi) SE of Stalingrad, PQ 49 451
– 1943 –
203	June? 1943	—	Mosquito	Groningen	205	6 September 1943	10:50	B-17	30–50 km W of Stuttgart
204	28 or 30 July 1943	—	B-17	—	206	6 September 1943	11:08	B-17	southern Black Forest
– 1944 –
207	10 February 1944	11:50	B-17	5 km (3.1 mi) S of Celle; PQ 15 Ost S/FA-7	210	8 March 1944	—	P-51	near Celle; PQ FA-FE
208	24 February 1944	13:40	B-24	of 2 BD; Giessen area; PQ 05 Ost S/QT	211	29 March 1944	—	P-51	of 4 FG; N of Hanover
209	6 March 1944	—	B-24*	of 453 BG; W of Berlin	212	29 March 1944	—	P-51	of 4 FG; Schwarmstedt area
