= List of aerial victories claimed by Walter Krupinski =

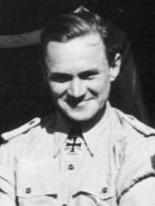
Krupinski, 28 August 1943

Walter Krupinski (11 November 1920 – 7 October 2000) was a German Luftwaffe fighter ace in World War II and a senior West German Air Force officer during the Cold War. He was one of the highest-scoring pilots in the war, credited with 197 victories in 1,100 sorties. He was called by his fellow pilots Graf Punski (Count Punski) due to his Prussian origins. Krupinski was one of the first to fly the Messerschmitt Me 262 jet fighter in combat as a member of Jagdverband 44 led by Adolf Galland.

== List of aerial victories claimed ==
According to US historian David T. Zabecki, Krupinski was credited with 197 aerial victories. Spick also lists Krupinski with 197 aerial victories, claimed in approximately 1,100 combat missions. This figure includes 177 aerial victories claimed over the Eastern Front and 20 in the western theatre of operations and includes one heavy bomber. Mathews and Foreman, authors of Luftwaffe Aces — Biographies and Victory Claims, researched the German Federal Archives and found records for 197 aerial victory claims, plus five further unconfirmed claims. This figure of confirmed claims includes 178 aerial victories on the Eastern Front and 19 on the Western Front, including one four-engined bomber and two victories with the Me 262 jet fighter.

Victory claims were logged to a map-reference (PQ = Planquadrat), for example "PQ 28472". The Luftwaffe grid map (Jägermeldenetz) covered all of Europe, western Russia and North Africa and was composed of rectangles measuring 15 minutes of latitude by 30 minutes of longitude, an area of about 360 square miles (930 km^{2}). These sectors were then subdivided into 36 smaller units to give a location area 3 km × 4 km (1.9 mi × 2.5 mi) in size.

♠ (Ace of spades) indicates those aerial victories which made Krupinski an "ace-in-a-day", a term which designates a fighter pilot who has shot down five or more airplanes in a single day.
– (dash) indicates unconfirmed aerial victory claims for which Krupinski did not receive credit.
! (exclamation mark) indicates those aerial victories listed by Braatz, Caldwell, Mombeek, Prien, Stemmer, Rodeike and Bock.
# (hash mark) indicates those aerial victories listed by Mathews and Foreman.
? (question mark) indicates information discrepancies listed by Braatz, Prien, Stemmer, Rodeike, Bock, Mathews and Foreman.

Claim!	Claim#	Date	Time	Type	Location	Claim!	Claim#	Date	Time	Type	Location
– 6. Staffel of Jagdgeschwader 52 –
1	1	16 August 1941	05:48	I-18 (MiG-1)	12 km (7.5 mi) north of Shimsk	18	18	24 July 1942	11:52	LaGG-3	PQ 28472
2	2	17 September 1941	17:47	DB-3		19	19	25 July 1942	08:35	Il-2	PQ 18621
3	3	21 September 1941	05:56	I-153		20	20	26 July 1942	05:40	R-5	PQ 28574
4	4	4 October 1941	13:30	SB-2	30 km (19 mi) north of Kholm	21	21	23 August 1942	05:30	LaGG-3	PQ 49652; 50 km (31 mi) south-southeast of Stalingrad
5	5	17 October 1941	15:15	I-18 (MiG-1)		22	22	23 August 1942	05:37	LaGG-3	PQ 49429; 25 km (16 mi) east of Stalingrad
6	6	23 October 1941	14:15	R-5		23	23	23 August 1942	11:55	LaGG-3	PQ 49651; 50 km (31 mi) south-southeast of Stalingrad
7	7	28 November 1941	10:30	Il-2	southeast of Zaluchye	24	24	23 August 1942	12:02	LaGG-3	PQ 49622; 35 km (22 mi) south-southeast of Stalingrad
8	8	4 June 1942	18:54	MiG-1	10 km (6.2 mi) northwest of Kupiansk	25	25	24 August 1942	13:15	I-180 (Yak-7)	PQ 44273; 15 km (9.3 mi) east of Stalingrad
9	9	5 June 1942	16:48	LaGG-3		26	26	25 August 1942	17:35	I-180 (Yak-7)	PQ 49112; 20 km (12 mi) north-northeast of Pitomnik Airfield
10	10	14 June 1942	15:45	LaGG-3		27	27	26 August 1942	17:20	LaGG-3	PQ 49274; 10 km (6.2 mi) east of Stalingrad
11	11	22 June 1942	07:28	MiG-1		28	28	27 August 1942	12:11	LaGG-3	PQ 49332 vicinity of Stalingrad
12	12	24 June 1942	11:51	LaGG-3		29	29	28 August 1942	14:01	LaGG-3	PQ 5932
13	13	30 June 1942	09:20	LaGG-3		30	30	29 August 1942	16:42	Il-2	PQ 40427
14	14	14 July 1942	03:45	DB-3		31	31	31 August 1942	08:47	Il-2	PQ 49533; 35–40 km (22–25 mi) south of Stalingrad
15	15	23 July 1942	04:40	I-16	PQ 28351; 30 km (19 mi) southwest of Zymlianskaja	32	32	2 September 1942	08:38	MiG-1	PQ 66663; Kerch Strait, west of Zaporozhskaya
16	16	23 July 1942	06:48	Il-2	PQ 18453	33	33	7 September 1942	09:20	MiG-1	PQ 44652
17	17	24 July 1942	11:45	LaGG-3	PQ 28322; 20 km (12 mi) southwest of Zymlianskaja	34	34	7 September 1942	09:30	LaGG-3	PQ 44484
– 4. Staffel of Jagdgeschwader 52 –
35	35	13 September 1942	15:50? (Note: According to Mathews and Foreman claimed at 15:15.)	Yak-1	PQ 54642 west of Bolkhov	42	42	25 September 1942	05:03	Il-2	PQ 05342
36	36	19 September 1942	10:50	U-2	PQ 54653	43	43	25 September 1942	05:08	Il-2	PQ 05511
37	37	23 September 1942	12:10	LaGG-3	PQ 95793 vicinity of Lazarevskoye	44	44	25 September 1942	12:24	R-5	PQ 94161, Lazarevskoye vicinity of Lazarevskoye
38	38	24 September 1942	05:55	I-153	PQ 95713; 10 km (6.2 mi) north of Tuapse	45	45	25 September 1942	15:16	R-5	PQ 94411
39	39	24 September 1942	06:00	I-15	PQ 95743 vicinity of Tuapse	46	46	26 September 1942	16:20? (Note: According to Mathews and Foreman claimed at 16:24.)	I-153	PQ 94411
40	40	24 September 1942	06:02	I-153	PQ 95742 vicinity of Tuapse	47	47	27 September 1942	11:45? (Note: According to Braatz claimed at 11:35.)	I-15	PQ 04541
41	41	24 September 1942	15:53	LaGG-3	PQ 94133						
– 6. Staffel of Jagdgeschwader 52 –
48	48	7 October 1942	06:10	Yak-1	PQ 95552; 30 km (19 mi) north-northeast of Tuapse	58	58	30 October 1942	15:30	Yak-1	PQ 94163 vicinity of Lazarevskoye
49	49	9 October 1942	12:45	I-153	PQ 95552; 30 km (19 mi) north-northeast of Tuapse	59	59	30 October 1942	15:40	I-15	PQ 94161 vicinity of Lazarevskoye
50	50	9 October 1942	13:20	LaGG-3	PQ 95772; Black Sea, 10 km (6.2 mi) south of Tuapse	60	60	1 November 1942	14:07	I-153	PQ 95743 vicinity of Tuapse
51	51	11 October 1942	05:20	LaGG-3	PQ 95752, Kosalsaki; 15 km (9.3 mi) east of Tuapse	61	61	1 November 1942	14:35? (Note: According to Mathews and Foreman claimed at 14:25.)	Yak-1	PQ 94133
52	52	11 October 1942	05:35	I-153	PQ 95751; 15 km (9.3 mi) east of Tuapse	62	62	11 November 1942	08:00	Yak-1	PQ 94161, Lazarevskoye vicinity of Lazarevskoye
53	53	11 October 1942	05:37	I-153	PQ 95751; 15 km (9.3 mi) east of Tuapse	63	63	11 November 1942	08:14	Yak-1	PQ 94161, Lazarevskoye vicinity of Lazarevskoye
54	54	16 October 1942	05:55	Yak-1	PQ 94121	64	64	11 November 1942	11:03	I-15	PQ 94152
55	55	22 October 1942	16:20	I-153	PQ 95541, north of Maikop; 30 km (19 mi) north of Tuapse	65	65	13 November 1942	11:17	I-153	PQ 95721 vicinity of Tuapse
56	56	23 October 1942	16:10	Il-2	PQ 94473	66	66	19 November 1942	07:15	Yak-1	PQ 94491
57	57	29 October 1942	15:40	Yak-1	PQ 95791; 20 km (12 mi) east-southeast of Tuapse						
– 7. Staffel of Jagdgeschwader 52 –
67	67	2 May 1943	17:41? (Note: According to Mathews and Foreman claimed at 17:43.)	Yak-1	PQ 34 Ost 85171, southwest of Abinsk east of Krymsk	123	123	25 September 1943	11:10	LaGG-3	PQ 34 Ost 58281; 40 km (25 mi) east of Zaporizhia
68	68	4 May 1943	10:40? (Note: According to Mathews and Foreman claimed at 12:40.)	LaGG-3	PQ 34 Ost 85311 vicinity of Schapssugskaja	124	124	27 September 1943	08:45	LaGG-3	PQ 34 Ost 59752; 25 km (16 mi) southeast of Grischino
69	69	6 May 1943	14:55? (Note: According to Mathews and Foreman claimed at 14:35.)	LaGG-3	PQ 34 Ost 85213 vicinity of Rekrowskij	125	125	27 September 1943	08:50	LaGG-3	PQ 34 Ost 59843; 45 km (28 mi) northeast of Zaporizhia
70	70	11 May 1943	08:05	LaGG-3	PQ 34 Ost 85181 northeast of Usun	126	126	27 September 1943	14:21	LaGG-3	PQ 34 Ost 58192; 15 km (9.3 mi) east-southeast of Zaporizhia
71	71	11 May 1943	16:07	LaGG-3	PQ 34 Ost 86682 north of Nowowelitschkowskaja	127	127	27 September 1943	16:05	LaGG-3	PQ 34 Ost 59813; 45 km (28 mi) south-southwest of Pawlohrad
72	72	16 May 1943	14:55	U-2	PQ 34 Ost 85152, north of Abinsk east of Sorin	128	128	28 September 1943	10:33	Il-2 m.H. (Note: The "m.H." refers to an Ilyushin Il-2 with rear gunner (mit Heckschütze).)	PQ 34 Ost 58193; 15 km (9.3 mi) east-southeast of Zaporizhia
73	73	28 May 1943	09:35	LaGG-3	PQ 34 Ost 86751 east of Trojzkaja	129	129	30 September 1943	12:17	P-39	PQ 34 Ost 58643; 15 km (9.3 mi) northwest of Bolschoj Tokmak
74	74	28 May 1943	09:50	Spitfire	PQ 34 Ost 86774 vicinity of Bondarenka	130	130	1 October 1943	06:15	LaGG-3	PQ 34 Ost 58362; 25 km (16 mi) southeast of Zaporizhia
75	75	29 May 1943	11:53	LaGG-3	PQ 34 Ost 75232, north of Krymskaja north of Krymsk	131	131	1 October 1943	07:49	LaGG-3	PQ 34 Ost 58133; 20 km (12 mi) northeast of Zaporizhia
76	76	29 May 1943	18:07	LaGG-3	PQ 34 Ost 76894 vicinity of Kijewakoje	132	132	1 October 1943	08:13	LaGG-3	PQ 34 Ost 58132; 20 km (12 mi) northeast of Zaporizhia
77	77	30 May 1943	15:30	Pe-2	PQ 34 Ost 76863, north of Kijewskoje north of Kessjetowa	133	133	1 October 1943	11:17	LaGG-3	PQ 34 Ost 58184; 5 km (3.1 mi) southeast of Zaporizhia
78	78	31 May 1943	14:15	LaGG-3	PQ 34 Ost 86714 south of Slavyansk-Na	134	134	2 October 1943	10:55	LaGG-3	PQ 34 Ost 58674; 10 km (6.2 mi) northwest of Bolschoj Tokmak
79	79	2 June 1943	13:03	LaGG-3	PQ 34 Ost 75231, northwest of Krymskaja northwest of Krymsk	135	135	3 October 1943	15:10	LaGG-3	PQ 34 Ost 58124; 15 km (9.3 mi) north-northeast of Zaporizhia
80	80	3 June 1943	04:53? (Note: According to Mathews and Foreman claimed at 04:43.)	LaGG-3	PQ 34 Ost 86732 south of Trojzkaja	136	136	4 October 1943	11:10	LaGG-3	PQ 34 Ost 58113; 20 km (12 mi) north-northwest of Zaporizhia
81	81	3 June 1943	13:20? (Note: According to Mathews and Foreman claimed at 13:30.)	I-180 (Yak-7)	PQ 34 Ost 75232, north of Krymskaja north of Krymsk	137	137	5 October 1943	07:09	LaGG-3	PQ 34 Ost 49171; 55 km (34 mi) east-northeast of Mironowka
82	82	5 June 1943	11:20	La-5	PQ 34 Ost 75232, north of Krymskaja north of Krymsk	138	138	6 October 1943	10:02	LaGG-3	PQ 34 Ost 49184; 65 km (40 mi) northwest of Dnepropetrovsk
83	83	5 June 1943	15:18	La-5	PQ 34 Ost 86774 vicinity of Bondarenka	139	139	7 October 1943	06:45	LaGG-3	PQ 34 Ost 49133; 75 km (47 mi) east-southeast of Kremenchuk
84	84	9 June 1943	14:42	La-5	PQ 34 Ost 85132 northwest of Nowo-Petrowskij	140	140	7 October 1943	11:55	LaGG-3	PQ 34 Ost 49362; 45 km (28 mi) west-northwest of Dnepropetrovsk
85	85	10 June 1943	18:42	LaGG-3	PQ 34 Ost 86783 east of Bondarenka	141	141	8 October 1943	07:33	Pe-2	PQ 34 Ost 58472; 30 km (19 mi) north of Bolschoj Tokmak
86	86	13 June 1943	07:37	Boston	PQ 34 Ost 75251	142	142	9 October 1943	11:51	P-39	PQ 34 Ost 49171; 55 km (34 mi) east-northeast of Mironowka
87	87	20 June 1943	10:25	LaGG-3	PQ 34 Ost 85341 vicinity of Tscheshskij	143	143	9 October 1943	11:52	P-39	PQ 34 Ost 49322, west of Schulgowka; 60 km (37 mi) west-northwest of Dnepropetrovsk
88	88	26 June 1943	15:15	La-5	PQ 34 Ost 85372 vicinity of Gelendzhik	144♠	144	10 October 1943	06:55	LaGG-3	PQ 34 Ost 58163, east of Zaporizhia vicinity of Barbastedt
89	89	5 July 1943	07:15	LaGG-3	PQ 35 Ost 61154; 10 km (6.2 mi) north of Krasnyi Lyman	145♠	145	10 October 1943	07:10	LaGG-3	PQ 34 Ost 58163, east of Zaporizhia vicinity of Barbastedt
90	90	5 July 1943	18:05	LaGG-3	PQ 35 Ost 61121; 5 km (3.1 mi) northeast of Bogatoje	146♠	146	10 October 1943	08:40	P-39	PQ 34 Ost 49183; 65 km (40 mi) northwest of Dnepropetrovsk
91	91	12 August 1943	17:15? (Note: According to Mathews and Foreman claimed at 17:25.)	LaGG-3	PQ 35 Ost 61751; 20 km (12 mi) north of Kharkov	147♠	147	10 October 1943	09:40	P-39	PQ 34 Ost 49183; 65 km (40 mi) northwest of Dnepropetrovsk
92	92	13 August 1943	14:07	LaGG-3	PQ 35 Ost 60212; 15 km (9.3 mi) west of Losowaja	148♠	148	10 October 1943	12:18	LaGG-3	PQ 34 Ost 58154 northeast of Zaporizhia
93	93	15 August 1943	09:04	Pe-2	PQ 35 Ost 61721; 20 km (12 mi) east-southeast of Zolochev	149♠	149	10 October 1943	15:35? (Note: According to Mathews and Foreman claimed at 15:25.)	LaGG-3	PQ 34 Ost 58194; 15 km (9.3 mi) east-northeast of Zaporizhia
94	94	15 August 1943	11:54	LaGG-3	PQ 35 Ost 51813; 10 km (6.2 mi) north of Bohodukhiv	150	150	12 October 1943	06:52	LaGG-3	PQ 34 Ost 58161, Zaporizhia; 20 km (12 mi) east of Zaporizhia
95	95	16 August 1943	17:56	LaGG-3	PQ 35 Ost 70792; 20 km (12 mi) southeast of Izum	151	151	12 October 1943	07:18	Il-2 m.H.	PQ 34 Ost 58122; 15 km (9.3 mi) north-northeast of Zaporizhia
96	96	17 August 1943	08:07	LaGG-3	PQ 35 Ost 70794; 20 km (12 mi) southeast of Izum	152? (Note: Not listed by Braatz.)	152	12 October 1943	13:56	LaGG-3	PQ 34 Ost 58114; 15 km (9.3 mi) north-northeast of Zaporizhia
97	97	17 August 1943	10:00	LaGG-3	PQ 35 Ost 70794; 20 km (12 mi) southeast of Izum		153	12 October 1943	15:45	La-5	20 km (12 mi) north-northwest of Zaporizhia
98	98	17 August 1943	17:30	P-39	PQ 35 Ost 70762; 15 km (9.3 mi) southeast of Izum	153	154	13 October 1943	07:51	LaGG-3	PQ 34 Ost 58161, Zaporizhia; 20 km (12 mi) east of Zaporizhia
99	99	18 August 1943	09:55	LaGG-3	PQ 35 Ost 60241; 25 km (16 mi) east-southeast of Kharkov	154	155	13 October 1943	11:50	LaGG-3	PQ 34 Ost 58782; 20 km (12 mi) north-northeast of Zaporizhia
100	100	18 August 1943	12:47	LaGG-3	PQ 35 Ost 61794; 15 km (9.3 mi) northeast of Kharkov	155	156	19 October 1943	07:12	P-39	PQ 34 Ost 39474, 6 km (3.7 mi) east of Scheltoje; 20 km (12 mi) southeast of Mironowka
101	101	19 August 1943	12:55	LaGG-3	PQ 34 Ost 88293, southwest of Kuybyshev; 15 km (9.3 mi) east of Jalisawehino	156	157	20 October 1943	06:00	LaGG-3	PQ 34 Ost 39413; 20 km (12 mi) northeast of Mironowka
102	102	20 August 1943	07:29	LaGG-3	PQ 34 Ost 88294, west of Kuybyshev; 15 km (9.3 mi) east of Jalisawehino	157	158	21 October 1943	06:13	P-39	PQ 34 Ost 39463; 40 km (25 mi) east-southeast of Mironowka
103	103	20 August 1943	07:55	LaGG-3	PQ 34 Ost 88291; 15 km (9.3 mi) east of Jalisawehino	158	159	21 October 1943	09:28	P-39	PQ 34 Ost 39621; 10 km (6.2 mi) east of Pjatichatki
104	104	20 August 1943	11:37	LaGG-3	PQ 34 Ost 88264 vicinity of Jalisawehino	159	160	29 October 1943	07:03	P-39	PQ 34 Ost 39532; 20 km (12 mi) southwest of Stschastliwaja
105	105	20 August 1943	13:32	LaGG-3	PQ 34 Ost 88282, west of Kuybyshev; 5 km (3.1 mi) southeast of Jalisawehino	160	161	29 October 1943	11:15	P-39	PQ 34 Ost 39534; 20 km (12 mi) southwest of Stschastliwaja
106	106	21 August 1943	13:02	LaGG-3	PQ 34 Ost 88272; 15 km (9.3 mi) west-southwest of Jalisawehino	161	162	6 November 1943	09:12	P-39	PQ 34 Ost 39694; 25 km (16 mi) southeast of Pjatichatki
107	107	21 August 1943	13:15	LaGG-3	PQ 34 Ost 88282, west of Kuybyshev; 5 km (3.1 mi) southeast of Jalisawehino	162	163	6 November 1943	12:20	LaGG-3	PQ 34 Ost 48211; 25 km (16 mi) east-northeast of Apostolove
108	108	22 August 1943	10:08	P-39	PQ 34 Ost 88271, Amwrosijewka; 20 km (12 mi) northeast of Kuteinykove	163	164	6 November 1943	14:45	LaGG-3	PQ 34 Ost 49714; 65 km (40 mi) east-northeast of Kriwoj-Rog
109	109	22 August 1943	15:43	P-39	PQ 34 Ost 88293, southwest of Kuybyshev; 15 km (9.3 mi) east of Jalisawehino	164	165	6 November 1943	15:00	LaGG-3	PQ 34 Ost 49544; 60 km (37 mi) east-southeast of Stschastliwaja
110	110	23 August 1943	15:20	P-39	PQ 34 Ost 88242; 20 km (12 mi) northeast of Kuteinykove	165	166	22 November 1943	14:00	LaGG-3	PQ 34 Ost 49713; 65 km (40 mi) east-northeast of Kriwoj-Rog
111	111	24 August 1943	11:59	LaGG-3	PQ 34 Ost 88284; 10 km (6.2 mi) southwest of Jalisawehino	166	167	27 November 1943	09:23	LaGG-3	PQ 34 Ost 48591; 25 km (16 mi) south of Nikopol
112	112	26 August 1943	08:27	P-39	PQ 34 Ost 88431 vicinity of Marienkeim	167	168	27 November 1943	12:56	LaGG-3	PQ 34 Ost 58341; 20 km (12 mi) south of Zaporizhia
113	113	26 August 1943	15:51	LaGG-3	PQ 34 Ost 89891; 25 km (16 mi) northeast of Jalisawehino	168	169	27 November 1943	13:11	LaGG-3	PQ 34 Ost 48434; 20 km (12 mi) southwest of Zaporizhia
114	114	27 August 1943	06:32	P-39	PQ 34 Ost 88421; 20 km (12 mi) south of Jalisawehino	169	170	28 November 1943	08:16	LaGG-3	PQ 34 Ost 58174; 5 km (3.1 mi) southwest of Zaporizhia
115	115	27 August 1943	13:20	Spitfire	PQ 34 Ost 88412, west of Uspenskaja; 20 km (12 mi) southwest of Jalisawehino	170	171	28 November 1943	13:25	LaGG-3	PQ 34 Ost 58194; 15 km (9.3 mi) east-northeast of Zaporizhia
116	116	27 August 1943	13:40	P-39	PQ 34 Ost 88194; 10 km (6.2 mi) east of Kuteinykove	171	172	29 November 1943	07:05	Boston	PQ 34 Ost 48424; 25 km (16 mi) northeast of Nikopol
117	117	29 August 1943	11:25? (Note: According to Mathews and Foreman claimed at 11:26.)	Pe-2	PQ 34 Ost 88672; 25 km (16 mi) west-northwest of Taganrog	172	173	29 November 1943	14:40	LaGG-3	PQ 34 Ost 48432; 20 km (12 mi) southwest of Zaporizhia
118	118	21 September 1943	11:27	Il-2 m.H.	PQ 34 Ost 58123; 15 km (9.3 mi) north-northeast of Zaporizhia	173	174	30 November 1943	07:57	LaGG-3	PQ 34 Ost 39862; 15 km (9.3 mi) east of Perekop
119	119	21 September 1943	16:13	LaGG-3	PQ 34 Ost 58421; 25 km (16 mi) east-northeast of Zaporizhia	174	175	26 February 1944	12:00	P-39	PQ 29522; Alekandrovka
120	120	22 September 1943	12:10	LaGG-3	PQ 34 Ost 58271; 25 km (16 mi) east of Zaporizhia	175	176	9 March 1944	10:53	La-5	PQ 60421; 20 km (12 mi) southeast of Malinovka
121	121	23 September 1943	13:15	LaGG-3	PQ 34 Ost 58163 vicinity of Barbastedt	176	177	11 March 1944	12:30	Il-2	PQ 70552; 20 km (12 mi) northwest of Izum
122	122	24 September 1943	14:10	LaGG-3	PQ 34 Ost 58132; 20 km (12 mi) northeast of Zaporizhia	177	178	16 March 1944	15:05	La-5	PQ 51532; 20 km (12 mi) west of Dubno
– 2. Staffel of Jagdgeschwader 5 –
178	179	10 May 1944	11:30	B-17	PQ 14 Ost S/GN, south of Wiener Neustadt	180	181	11 May 1944	19:25	P-51	vicinity of Saarbrücken
179	180	11 May 1944	19:17	P-51	vicinity of Saarbrücken	181	182	12 May 1944	11:52	P-47	PQ 05 Ost S/TS-6
– Stab II. Gruppe of Jagdgeschwader 11 –
182	183	19 May 1944	12:45	P-47	PQ 05 Ost S/ET/FT, south of Verden	187	188	14 June 1944	20:45	P-47	PQ 15 Ost S/RG/SG, vicinity of Saint-Quentin
183	184	19 May 1944	12:55	P-47	PQ 05 Ost S/FS/FT, southwest of Verden	188	189	28 June 1944	07:45	P-38	PQ 05 Ost S/NH/OH, south of Ghent
184	185	24 May 1944	10:28? (Note: According to Mathews and Foreman claimed at 10:40.)	P-51	PQ 05 Ost S/UT-4/4, southeast of Heide	189	190	1 July 1944	19:55	P-47	PQ 05 Ost S/PG/QG, vicinity of Valenciennes
185	186	30 May 1944	11:10? (Note: According to Mathews and Foreman claimed at 11:20.)	P-51	PQ 15 Ost S/JC, southwest of Magdeburg	190	191	1 July 1944	19:55	P-47	PQ 05 Ost S/PG/QG, vicinity of Valenciennes
186	187	30 May 1944	11:10?	P-51	PQ 15 Ost S/JC, southwest of Magdeburg	191	192	1 July 1944	19:58	P-47	PQ 05 Ost S/PG/QG, vicinity of Valenciennes
– Stab III. Gruppe of Jagdgeschwader 26 –
192	—	27 September 1944	18:21	Spitfire			—	27 November 1944	—	P-51	Rheine
	—	12 October 1944	15:50	P-51		194	194	17 December 1944	—	Tempest? (Note: According to Mathews and Foreman a North American P-51 Mustang.)	
193	193	21 November 1944	12:58	P-51	PQ 05 Ost HP/JP; Coesfeld	195	195	17 December 1944	—	Tempest?	
	—	27 November 1944	—	P-51	Rheine						
– Jagdverband 44 –
	196	4 April 1945	—	P-51	vicinity of Stuttgart	197	—	26 April 1945	15:05	B-26	
196	197	16 April 1945	—	B-26	vicinity of Stuttgart						
