= List of World War II aces from Germany: A–F =

This is a list of fighter aces in World War II from Germany with their surname starting from A to F. A flying ace or fighter ace is a military aviator credited with shooting down five or more enemy aircraft during aerial combat. Aces are listed alphabetically by last name.

== Aces ==
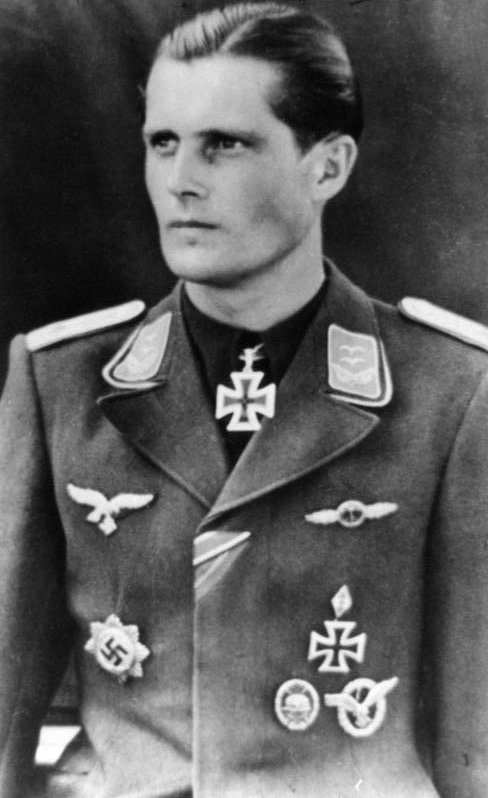
Egon Albrecht, 25 claims

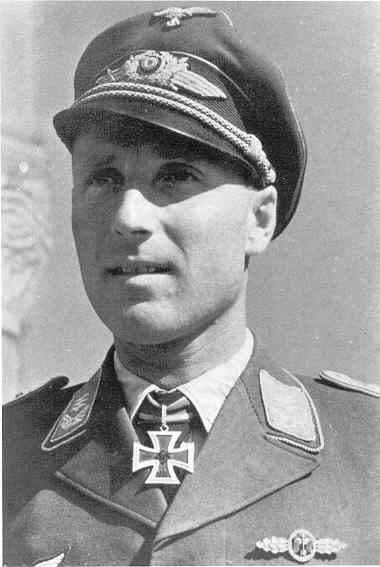
Wilhelm Batz, 237 claims

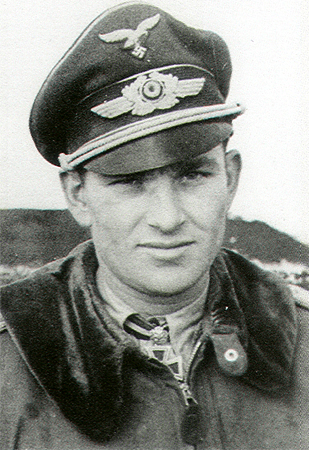
Gerhard Barkhorn, 301 claims

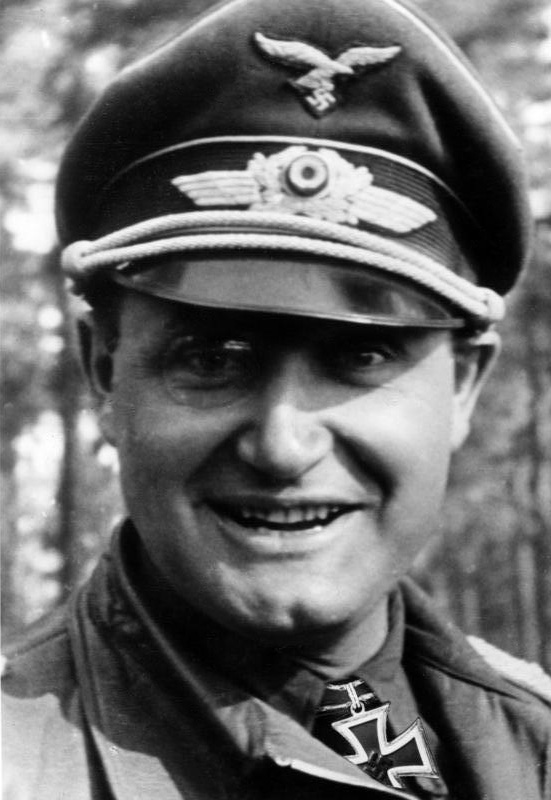
Friedrich Beckh

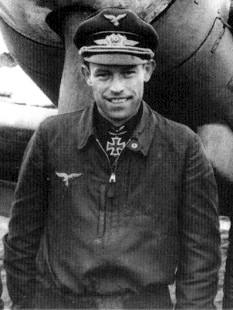
Heinrich Ehrler, 209 claims

By surname: G–L • M–P • Q–S • T–Z

This along with the * (asterisk), indicates that the pilot was either killed in action (KIA), missing in action (MIA), died of wounds (DOW), killed in a flying accident (KIFA), or killed in a car accident (KICA).
This and the / (slash) indicates information discrepancies listed by Aders, Boiten, Caldwell, Girbig, Held, Obermaier, Spick, Ring, Toliver, Constable, Mathews, Foreman and Zabecki.

=== A ===
Name	Rank	Claims	Unit	Notes
Hans Adam*	Leutnant	11	JG 51	KIA 12 March 1945
Heinz-Günther Hans Adam*	Leutnant	5	JG 26	KIFA 20 December 1942
Helmut Adam*	Unteroffizier	12	EJGr Ost, JG 52	KIA 1 July 1942
Hans Adelhütte*	Oberleutnant	15–20	KG 41, KG 3, NJG 7, NJG 3	KIA 13 August 1944
Horst Ademeit*	Major	166/160	JG 54	Knight's Cross with Oak Leaves; KIA 7 August 1944 mission-to-claim ratio of 3.61.
Walter Adolph*	Hauptmann	28/25/24 (+1 in Spain; +4 unconfirmed)/21	J/88, JG 27, JG 26	Knight's Cross; KIA 18 September 1941 mission-to-claim ratio of 2.82.
Gustav Ahlbrand*	Unteroffizier	14	JG 52	KIA 22 August 1943
Heinrich-Wilhelm Ahnert*	Oberfeldwebel	57	JG 52	Knight's Cross; KIA 15 August 1942
Peter Ahrens*	Leutnant	11	JG 26	KIFA 4 March 1945
Johann Aistleitner*	Hauptmann	13/11/12	JG 26	KIA 14 January 1944
Egon Albrecht-Lemke*	Hauptmann	25/18+	ZG 76, SKG 210, ZG 1, JG 76	Knight's Cross; KIA 25 August 1944
Heinz Albrecht*	Oberfeldwebel	6+	JG 11	KIA 2 May 1945
Vicente Aldecoa	Leutnant	8	JG 51	
Herbert Aloe*	Hauptmann	31/35	JG 54	German Cross; MIA 21 June 1944
Heinz Hans Altendorf	Oberleutnant	24	JG 53	German Cross; POW 16 December 1941
Rudolf Altendorf	Hauptmann	29/25/24	LG 1, NJG 3, NJG 4, NJG 1, NJG 5	KIA 1. Januar 1945
Herbert Altner	Leutnant	23/21	ZG 76, NJG 3, NJG 5, NJG 11	
Ernst-Georg Altnorthoff	Oberleutnant	11	JG 27	
Alfred Ambs	Leutnant	8	JG 7	
Hermann Amend*	Unteroffizier	10	JG 5	KIA 5 August 1944
Georg Amon	Oberfeldwebel	9	JG 53	POW 2 April 1945
Peter "Pit" Andel	Leutnant	6	JG 26	KIA 10. April 1944
Werner Andres	Oberstleutnant	5	JG 3	
Lorenz Andresen*	Oberleutnant	5+	JG 5	KIA 20 July 1944
Heinz Angres*	Fahnenjunker-Feldwebel	8	JG 3	KIA 16 October 1944
Paul Angst	Leutnant	5	JG 3, EJG 1	
Robert Anlauf*	Feldwebel	10	JG 52	KIA 28 March 1945
Walter Appel*	Gefreiter	5	JG 27	KIA 14 June 1944
Jose Damaso Arango-Lopez	Hauptmann	6	JG 51	
Elmar Arensmeyer	Feldwebel	16/10	JG 51, JG 101, EJGr Ost	
Heinz Arnold*	Oberfeldwebel	48	JG 5, JG 7	KIA 17 April 1945
Walter Arnold	Leutnant	8/6	JG 27	
Rudolf Artner	Unteroffizier	20	JG 5	
Heinrich Asche	Unteroffizier	8	JG 54	
Roloff von Aspern*	Oberleutnant	19	JG 21, JG 76, JG 54	KIA 17 November 1940
Hermann Aubrecht	Oberfeldwebel	31/28	JG 51	German Cross
Hans-Heinz Augenstein*	Oberleutnant	46/41/40	NJG 1	Knight's Cross; KIA 6 December 1944 – 10 km NW of Münster-Handorf airfield by a 85 Sqdn Mosquito
Jakob Augustin*	Leutnant	16	JG 2	MIA 15 July 1942
Hans Autenrieth	Hauptmann	23/22/21	NJG 1, NJG 4	German Cross
Vdenko Avdic	Leutnant	8	JG 52, JG 104	
Luis Azqueta-Brunet	Oberleutnant	5	JG 51	

=== B ===
Name	Rank	Claims	Unit	Notes
Sophus Baagoe*	Oberleutnant	14	ZG 76	Knight's Cross; KIA 14 May 1941
Werner Baake	Hauptmann	43/41/40	NJG 1	Knight's Cross
Emil Babenz	Oberfeldwebel	24/23	JG 26, JG 53	German Cross
Otto Rudolf Bach*	Leutnant	9+	JG 2, EJGr West, JG 1	incl. 8 heavy bombers KIA 7 August 1944
Fridolin Bachhuber*	Feldwebel	11/10	JG 103, JG 105, JG 54	MIA 1 January 1945
Friedrich-Karl Bachmann*	Oberleutnant	31	JG 52	KIA 4 September 1942
Fritz Bachmann	Leutnant	5	JG 5, JG 2	
Herbert Bachnick*	Leutnant	80/78	JG 52	Knight's Cross; KIA 7 August 1944
Johann Badum*	Leutnant	54/50+	JG 77	Knight's Cross; KIA 12 January 1943
Hans Baer*	Hauptmann	9	10.(N)/JG 72, 12.(N)/JG 2, NJG 3, NJG 5	KIFA 20/21 December 1943 in crash at Garwitz near Parchim due to engine exploding on takeoff
Jens Bahnsen*	Feldwebel	18	JG 27, JG 53	KIA 19 August 1943
Günther Bahr	Oberfeldwebel	37/35	NJG 6	Knight's Cross
Hans-Joachim Bahr*	Leutnant	8+	JG 2, JG 5	KIA 13 July 1942
Eberhard Baier	Unteroffizier	6	KG 51	
Josef Baldes	Oberfeldwebel	5	JG 5	
Wilfried Balfanz*	Oberleutnant	8	JG 51, JG 53	KIA 24 June 1941
Wilhelm Balthasar*	Major	47 (incl. 7 in Spain)/45	JG 27, JG 3, JG 2, JG 1	Knight's Cross with Oak Leaves; KIA 3 July 1941
Fritz Bär	Feldwebel	8	JG 51	
"Pritzel" Heinrich Bär	Oberstleutnant	222/221/220/208	JG 51, JG 77, JG 1, JG 3, EJG 2, JV 44	Knight's Cross with Oak Leaves and Swords incl. 21 heavy bombers
Wilfried Balfanz*	Oberleutnant	10	JG 51	KIA 24 June 1941
Kuno Balz*	Feldwebel	12	JG 51	KIA 18 March 1943
Herbert Bareuther*	Leutnant	55	JG 51, JG 3	German Cross; KIA 30 April 1945
Gerhard Barkhorn	Major	301/300	JG 2, JG 52, JG 6, JV 44	Knight's Cross with Oak Leaves and Swords mission-to-claim ratio of 3.67.
Gerhard-Alfred Bärsdorf*	Leutnant	7/5	JG 300	KIA 28 July 1944
Walter Barte	Major	18	NJG 1, NJG 3	
Heinrich Bartels*	Oberfeldwebel	99/94	JG 5, JG 27	Knight's Cross; KIA 23 December 1944
Franz Barten*	Hauptmann	52	JG 51, JG 53	Knight's Cross; KIA 4 August 1944
Günther Bartling*	Unteroffizier	11	JG 54	KIA February 1944
Hieronymus Bartosch*	Unteroffizier	13	JG 51	KIA 21 February 1944
Erich Bartz	Unteroffizier	30	JG 51	
Wilhelm Batz	Major	237/233	JG 52	Knight's Cross with Oak Leaves and Swords mission-to-claim ratio of 1.88.
Helmut Baudach*	Oberfeldwebel	20+	JG 2, EKdo 262, Kdo Nowotny, JG 7	KIA 22 February 1945
Alfons Bauer*	Unteroffizier	5	JG 51	KIA 8 August 1941
Franz Bauer*	Hauptmann	9	JG 53	KIA 18 June 1944
Herbert Bauer	Major	11	StG 2, SG 103	Knight's Cross with Oak Leaves
Konrad Bauer	Oberfeldwebel	68/57/38+	JG 51, JG 3, JG 300	Knight's Cross incl. 32 heavy bombers
Ludwig Bauer*	Oberleutnant	12	JG 27	MIA
Viktor Bauer	Oberst	106/104	JG 3	Knight's Cross with Oak Leaves mission-to-claim ratio of 3.77.
Wolfrat Bauer	Oberleutnant	6	NJG 1	KIA 4 January 1943 in crash at Duisburg-Hamborn; shot down by 'friendly' Flak
Helmut Bauhuber*	Unteroffizier	13	JG 51	KIA 12 July 1944
Heinz Baum*	Feldwebel	24	JG 3	MIA 12 December 1942
Helmut Baumann*	Leutnant	38	JG 51	KIA 17 February 1944
Hans-Joachim Beck	Oberleutnant	5	NJG 101	
Rudolf Beck*	Feldwebel	10	JG 51	KIA 27 November 1942
Karl-Heinz Becker	Feldwebel	7	NJG 11	
Ludwig Becker*	Hauptmann	46/44	14.(Z)/LG 1, NJG 1, NJG 2	Knight's Cross with Oak Leaves; KIA 26 February 1943
Martin Becker	Hauptmann	64/58/56	NJG 4, NJG 6	Knight's Cross with Oak Leaves
Paul Becker	Leutnant	20/19	JG 27	
Friedrich Beckh*	Oberstleutnant	48/40	JG 51, JG 52	Knight's Cross; KIA 21 June 1942
Gerhard Beckh*	Oberleutnant	12	JG 51	KIA 11 January 1944
Helmut Beckmann	Leutnant	18	JG 27	
Franz-Josef Beerenbrock	Leutnant	117/111	JG 51	Knight's Cross with Oak Leaves mission-to-claim ratio of 3.41.
Artur Beese	Oberleutnant	22	JG 26	German Cross
Wilhelm Beier	Oberleutnant	38/37/36	NJG 2, NJG 1	Knight's Cross
Hans Beißwenger*	Oberleutnant	152/150	JG 54	Knight's Cross with Oak Leaves; MIA 6 March 1943 mission-to-claim ratio of 3.29.
Kurt Bell*	Leutnant	7	JG 54	KIA 24 December 1944
Theodor Bellinghausen	Hauptmann	8/7	NJG 100	
Helmut Belser*	Hauptmann	36	JG 53	Knight's Cross; KIA 19 June 1942
Jakob Bender	Oberleutnant	6	ZG 76, NJG 1, NJ-Schule 1, NJG 101, NJG 102	
Karl-Heinz Bendert	Oberleutnant	55/54/44	JG 27, JG 104	Knight's Cross
Helmut Bennemann	Oberstleutnant	93/92/89	JG 52, JG 53	Knight's Cross
Anton Benning	Leutnant	28/14/13+	JG Herrmann, JG 300, JG 301, JG 302	Knight's Cross
Sigfried Benz	Leutnant	6	JG 26	
Friedrich Berger	Oberleutnant	5	NJG 3, NJGr 10	
Horst Berger*	Oberleutnant	26	JG 5	KIA 8 May 1944
Götz Bergmann*	Leutnant	16+	JG 51	KIA 20 July 1944
Helmut Bergmann	Hauptmann	36/33	NJG 4, NJG 1	Knight's Cross
Max Bernhardt*	Unteroffizier	11+	JG 51	KIA 10 August 1943
Heinz-Edgar Berres*	Hauptmann	53/52/49	JG 53	Knight's Cross; MIA 25 July 1943
Paul Bernd	Feldwebel	10	JG 11, JG 54	
Hans Berschwinger*	Oberfeldwebel	20/12/11	NJG 2, NJG 1	KIA 15 February 1944
Günther Bertram	Oberleutnant	35/29/28	KG 4, NJG 100	
Otto Bertram	Major	22 (incl. 9 in Spain)/21 (incl. 8 in Spain)/24	J/88, JG 2, JG 101, JG 6	Knight's Cross
Arthur Beth	Feldwebel	17	JG 5	
Siegfried Bethke	Hauptmann	12	JG 2	
Erich Beulich*	Oberfeldwebel	10	JG 5	KIA 14 September 1943
Ernst Beutelspacher*	Oberleutnant	5	SG 2	Knight's Cross; KIA 22 July 1944
Gerhard Beutin*	Oberfeldwebel	60	JG 54	KIA 1 February 1943
Franz Beyer*	Major	84/83/81	JG 3	Knight's Cross; KIA 11 February 1944
Georg Beyer	Oberleutnant	8/7	JG 26	
Heinz Beyer	Oberfeldwebel	33/27	JG 5	
Konrad Beyer	Feldwebel	13	NJG 4	
Helmut Biederbick	Leutnant	14	JG 54	
Werner Bielefeld	Leutnant	21	JG 51	
Ludwig Bietmann	Hauptmann	6	NJG 1	KIA 10/11 September 1942
Heinrich Bierwirth	Oberfeldwebel	8	JG 26	
Josef Bigge	Leutnant	6	JG 2, JGr West, EJG 1	WIA 6 September 1943 in crash on landing at Saint-André-de-l’Eure
Heinz Birk	Oberfeldwebel	14	JG 5	
Hans-Georg Birkenstock	Oberleutnant	7	NJG 1, NJG 4, NJG 6	KIA 19/20 May 1944 in crash at Vossenack/Eifel
Hans-Joachim Birkner*	Leutnant	117	JG 52	Knight's Cross; KIFA 14 December 1944 mission-to-claim ratio of 2.42.
Emil Bitsch*	Hauptmann	108/106	JG 3	Knight's Cross; KIA 15 March 1944
Helmut Bittkau	Oberleutnant	11	JG 51	
Franz Blazytko	Oberfeldwebel	30/29	JG 27	
Joachim Blechschmidt*	Oberstleutnant	17	ZG 1	Knight's Cross; MIA 13 July 1943
Günther Bleckmann*	Major	33	SG 1, SG 2	Knight's Cross; KIA 1 June 1944
Paul Bley*	Oberleutnant	8	ZG 26	KIFA 28 October 1944
Walter Blume	Major	14/8	JG 26, JG 27	
Hans-Ekkehard Bob	Major	60/57	JG 54, JG 3, JG 51, EJG 2, JV 44	Knight's Cross
Eberhard Bock*	Hauptmann	28	JG 3, JG 1, JG 104, JG 27	KIA 28 May 1944
Heinz Bock*	Leutnant	5	NJG 101, NJG 1	KIA 2/3 October 1943
Karl Böhm-Tettelbach	Oberstleutnant	6	ZG 26	
Kurt Bohn	Feldwebel	5	JG 26	
Paul Bohn	Oberleutnant	5	NJG 2	
Otto Böhner	Oberleutnant	5	JG 53	
Herbert Bönsch*	Hauptmann	11	Z./KG 30, NJG 1, NJG 2	KIA night of 31 July/1 August 1942
Karl Bolte*	Leutnant	6	JG 27	KIA
Helmut-Felix Bolz	Hauptmann	56/22	JG 2	
Eckart-Wilhelm von Bonin	Major	39/35/33	14.(Z)/LG 1, NJG 3, NJG 1, NJG 102	Knight's Cross
Hubertus von Bonin*	Oberstleutnant	77 (incl. 4 in Spain)/65	JG 26, JG 52, JG 54	Knight's Cross; KIA 15 December 1943
Kurt Bonow	Hauptmann	8	NJG 100, NJGr 10	
Hans Boos*	Oberleutnant	41	JG 51	KIA 21 April 1943
Adolf Borchers	Major	132	JG 51, JG 52	Knight's Cross
Walter Borchers*	Oberstleutnant	59/43/40	ZG 76, NJG 3, NJG 5	Knight's Cross; KIA 6 March 1945
Eberhard von Boremski	Hauptmann	90/88+	JG 3, EJG 1	Knight's Cross
Ernst Börngen	Hauptmann	45/41/35	JG 27	Knight's Cross
Hans-Joachim Borreck	Unteroffizier	5	JG 26	
Karl Borris	Major	43	JG 26	Knight's Cross
Oskar Bösch	Feldwebel	18	JG 3, JG 301, JG 7	
Wolfgang Böwing-Treuding*	Oberleutnant	46	JG 51	Knight's Cross; KIA 11 February 1943
Richard Brand	Oberfeldwebel	32	JG 51	
Felix-Maria Brandis*	Oberleutnant	14	JG 5	
Kurt Brändle*	Major	180/170	JG 53, JG 3	Knight's Cross with Oak Leaves; KIA 3 November 1943
Paul Brandt	Leutnant	34/30/29	JG 54	Knight's Cross; KIA 24 December 1944
Walter Brandt	Oberleutnant	57/42	LG 2, JG 77, JG 3	Knight's Cross
Hans-Heinrich Breitfeld*	Hauptmann	9	NJG 5	KIA 9/10 April 1945 on approach to Lübeck-Blankensee
Peter Bremer	Oberfeldwebel	38	JG 54	
Joachim Brendel	Hauptmann	189	JG 51	Knight's Cross with Oak Leaves
Heinz Bretnütz*	Hauptmann	37/32	JG 53	Knight's Cross; DOW 27 June 1941
Klaus Bretschneider*	Oberleutnant	34/24/22	JG 300	Knight's Cross; KIA 24 December 1944
Wendelin Breukel*	Leutnant	13	NJG 2	KIFA 1 March 1944 during low level transit flight
Adolf Breves	Hauptmann	18/17	NJG 1	
Walter Briegleb	Oberleutnant	24	NJG 3, NJG 2	
Franz Brinkhaus	Hauptmann	13	NJG 1, NJG 2, NJG 3	
Arnold Brinkmann	Hauptmann	16	NJG 3	
Hugo Broch	Leutnant	81	JG 54	Knight's Cross mission-to-claim ratio of 4.00.
Wilhelm Bromen	Oberleutnant	7	SG 2, SG 151, SG 9	Knight's Cross
Friedrich Brock	Oberleutnant	8/5	JG 54, JG 26	
Horst Brock*	Leutnant	17+	JG 3	KIA 3 November 1943
Jürgen Brocke*	Leutnant	42/39	JG 77	Knight's Cross; KIA 15 September 1942 mission-to-claim ratio of 3.57.
Hugo Brönner	Oberleutnant	16	JG 51	
Herbert Broennle*	Leutnant	59/58	JG 54	Knight's Cross; KIA 4 July 1943
Albert Brunner*	Oberfeldwebel	53	JG 5	Knight's Cross; KIA 7 May 1943 mission-to-claim ratio of 2.55.
Josef Brunner	Feldwebel	7	NJG 1, NJG 6	
Hermann Buchner	Leutnant	58	SG 2, JG 7	Knight's Cross
Horst Bucholz	Leutnant	5	JG 51	
Max Bucholz	Major	30/28	JG 3, JG 5, JG 101	Knight's Cross
Alfred Budde*	Leutnant	20	JG 54	KIA 27 December 1944
Adolf Buhl*	Oberleutnant	5	LG 2	KIA 27 September 1940
Kurt Bühligen	Oberstleutnant	112/99+	JG 2	Knight's Cross with Oak Leaves and Swords incl. 24 heavy bombers
Johannes Bunzek*	Leutnant	75/78	JG 52	Knight's Cross; KIA 11 December 1943
Eberhard Burath	Oberleutnant	6	JG 1, JG 51	
Lutz-Wilhelm Burckhardt	Hauptmann	69/61/58/57+	JG 77, JG 1	Knight's Cross
Alfred Burk	Oberleutnant	28/27	JG 52, JG 27	
Josef Bürschgens	Hauptmann	10	JG 26	
Erwin Busch	Oberleutnant	8	JG 26	
Rudolf Busch*	Hauptmann	40/27+	JG 51	KIA 17 January 1943
Franz Buschmann*	Hauptmann	10/8	NJG 2, NJG 1, NJG 3	KIA 28 June 1944
Heinz Busse*	Oberleutnant	22/19	JG 51	KIA 25 August 1944
Rolf Bussmann	Hauptmann	23/20	Z./KG 30, NJG 1, NJG 2, NJG 3, NJG 5	
Erich Büttner*	Oberfeldwebel	24/21	JG 51, EKdo 262, Kdo Nowotny, JG 7	KIA 20 March 1945
Johannes Büttner	Oberfeldwebel	16	JG 51	

=== C ===
Name	Rank	Claims	Unit	Notes
Horst Carganico*	Major	60	JG 5	Knight's Cross; KIA 27 May 1944
Franz Cech	Feldwebel	60	JG 3	
Georg Christl	Major	7	ZG 26, JG 10	Knight's Cross
Herbert Christmann*	Oberleutnant	5	JG 11, JG 50	KIA 20 August 1944
Ernst Christof	Feldwebel	9	JG 26	
Emil Clade	Hauptmann	27/26	JG 27	
Georg Claus*	Oberleutnant	18	JG 51	KIA 11 November 1940
Erwin Clausen*	Major	132/100	JG 77, JG 11	Knight's Cross with Oak Leaves; KIA 4 October 1943
Max Clerico	Hauptmann	7	JG 54	
Helmut Conter	Leutnant	15	NJG 100	
Karlheinz Cordes	Leutnant	62/43+	JG 54	
Wilhelm Crinius	Leutnant	114	JG 53	Knight's Cross with Oak Leaves
Peter Crump	Oberleutnant	31/24	JG 26	
Franz Czech	Feldwebel	60/33	JG 3	

=== D ===
Name	Rank	Claims	Unit	Notes
Klaus Dadd*	Feldwebel	14	JGr Ost, JG 52	KIA 19 June 1943
Walther Dahl	Oberst	129/128/90+	JG 3, JG 300	Knight's Cross with Oak Leaves
Hans Dahmen*	Gefreiter	5	JGr West, JG 105, JG 300	KIA 2 March 1945
Hugo Dahmer	Hauptmann	45/36	JG 26, JG 5, JG 2	Knight's Cross
Helmut Dahms	Oberfeldwebel	28/24	NJG 5, NJG 100	
Friedrich Dahn	Leutnant	25	JG 77, JG 5	
Paul-Heinrich Dähne*	Hauptmann	99+	JG 52, JG 1	Knight's Cross; KIFA 24 April 1945
Hans Dammers*	Leutnant	113/103	JG 52	Knight's Cross; DOW 17 March 1944
Emil Darjes	Leutnant	82	JG 54	
Franz Daspelgruber*	Oberleutnant	46	JG 3	KIA 16 July 1943
Rudi Dassow	Leutnant	22/22+	ZG 76, JG 6	Knight's Cross
Richard Delakowitz	Oberleutnant	7	NJG 4	
Karl-Emil Demuth	Oberleutnant	10+	JG 1	
Gustav Denk*	Oberleutnant	67	JG 52	Knight's Cross; KIA 13 February 1943
Robert Denzel*	Leutnant	9	NJG 1, NJG 3, NJG 2	KIA 25/26 June 1943
Adolf Dickfeld	Oberst	136/132	JG 52, JG 2, JG 11	Knight's Cross with Oak Leaves
Erwin Diekwisch	Hauptmann	12	StG 1	Knight's Cross
Ulrich Diesing*	Generalmajor	15	ZG 1	Knight's Cross; KICA 17 April 1945
Willi Dimter*	Oberleutnant	7	NJG 1, NJG 3, NJG 2	KIA 17 September 1942
Fritz Dinger*	Oberleutnant	67/64	JG 53	Knight's Cross; KIA 27 July 1943
Hans Dipple	Hauptmann	21	JG 26	
Heinrich Dittlmann	Oberfeldwebel	60	JG 51	
Gottfried Dietze	Leutnant	5	JG 26	
Anton Döbele*	Leutnant	94/93	JG 54	Knight's Cross; KIA 11 November 1943
Hans Döbrich	Feldwebel	65	JG 5	Knight's Cross
Kurt Dombacher	Oberleutnant	68	JG 5, JG 51	Knight's Cross
Otto Dommeratzky*	Leutnant	38/11+	LG 2, SG 1, SG 2, SG 151	Knight's Cross with Oak Leaves; KIA 13 October 1944
Georg Dörffel*	Major	30+	LG 2, SG 1, SG 4	Knight's Cross with Oak Leaves; KIA 26 May 1944
Arnold Döring	Leutnant	23/5+/5	KG 53, NJG 300, JG 3, JG 5	Knight's Cross
Wilhelm Dormann	Hauptmann	14	NJG 1, NJG 102	
Werner Dörnbrack	Major	29/23+	LG 2, SG 1, SG 2, SG 4	Knight's Cross with Oak Leaves
Franz Dörr	Hauptmann	128/122	JG 5	Knight's Cross
Edgar Dörre	Feldwebel	9	JG 26	
Karl Dörscheln	Oberleutnant	7	NJG 101, NJG 6	
Hans Dortenmann	Oberleutnant	39/38	JG 26, JG 54	Knight's Cross
Heinrich Dreisbach	Oberfeldwebel	16	JG 5	
Martin Drewes	Major	52/48/45	ZG 76, NJG 3, NJG 1	Knight's Cross with Oak Leaves
Ernst-Georg Drünkler	Hauptmann	47 (incl. two by day)/45/43	ZG 2, NJG 1, NJG 5, NJG 3	Knight's Cross
Alfred Druschel*	Oberst	7+	LG 2, SG 1, SG 4	Knight's Cross with Oak Leaves and Swords; MIA 1 January 1945
Rudi Düding	Oberfeldwebel	18/16	NJG 5, NJG 100	
Ewald Duhn*	Feldwebel	17	JG 52	KIA 23 October 1941
Ernst Düllberg	Major	50/45/43	JG 3, JG 27, JG 76, JG 7	Knight's Cross
Friedrich Dünkel	Hauptmann	10	NAG 2, NAG 4, NAG 1	
Otto Dürkop	Unteroffizier	8	KG 2, JG 54	
Peter Düttmann	Leutnant	152/150/147	JG 52	Knight's Cross

=== E ===
Name	Rank	Claims	Unit	Notes
Karl Ebbighausen	Hauptmann	7/10	JG 26	
Heinz Ebeling	Oberleutnant	18	JG 26	Knight's Cross
Kurt Ebener	Oberleutnant	57/51	JG 3, JG 11	Knight's Cross
Kurt Ebersberger	Hauptmann	30/31/27	JG 26	
Helmut Eberspächer	Hauptmann	7	SKG 10, NSGr 20, SG 151	Knight's Cross
Manfred Eberwein	Oberleutnant	56/44+	JG 54	
Reinhold Eckardt*	Oberleutnant	24/22/20	ZG 52, ZG 76, NJG 1, NJG 3	Knight's Cross; KIA 30 July 1942
Franz Eckerle*	Hauptmann	62/59	JG 54	Knight's Cross with Oak Leaves; MIA 14 February 1942
Georg-Peter Eder	Major	78/50+	JG 51, JG 26, JG 1, JG 2	Knight's Cross with Oak Leaves incl. 36 heavy bombers
Johannes Edmann*	Oberfeldwebel	5	JG 5, JG 26, JGr. West	KIA 21 March 1944
Walter Ehle*	Major	36/34/33	ZG 1, NJG 1	Knight's Cross; KIA 17 November 1943
Karl-Heinz Ehlen	Leutnant	7	JG 26	
Hans Ehlers*	Major	55/54/48	JG 3, JG 1	Knight's Cross; KIA 27 December 1944 incl. 24 heavy bombers
Rudolf Ehrenberger*	Oberfeldwebel	49/47	JG 53	Knight's Cross; KIA 8 March 1944
Peter Ehrhardt	Oberleutnant	22/20	NJG 1, NJG 5, NJG 11	
Heinrich Ehrler*	Major	209/205/182+	JG 5, JG 7	Knight's Cross with Oak Leaves; KIA 4 April 1945
Diethelm von Eichel-Streiber	Major	96/91	JG 1, JG 26, JG 51, JG 27, JV 44	Knight's Cross
Günther Eichhorn	Leutnant	8	JG 5	
Heinrich Eickhoff	Oberleutnant	6	JG 27	
Heinrich Graf von Einsiedel	Oberleutnant	35	JG 3	German Cross
Franz Eisenach	Major	129	JG 54	Knight's Cross
Xaver Ellenrieder	Leutnant	13/12	JG 26	
Franz Elles	Feldwebel	5	JG 27	
Willi Elstermann	Hauptmann	7	JGr 152, ZG 52, ZG 2, NJG 3, ZG 26, JG 6	
Walter Engel	Hauptmann	10/9	KG 3, NJG 5	Knight's Cross
Wilhelm Engel	Oberleutnant	20/18	NJG 1, NJG 4, NJG 6	WIA 23/24 February 1945
Siegfried Engfer	Oberleutnant	59/58	JG 3, JG 1	Knight's Cross
Egon Engling*	Feldwebel	12	NJG 2, NJG 3	KIA 26 March 1945
Hubert Engst	Oberfeldwebel	10+/5	JG Herrmann, JG 300	
Albert Espenlaub*	Oberfeldwebel	14	JG 27	
Wolf-Udo Ettel*	Oberleutnant	124/121	JG 3, JG 27	Knight's Cross with Oak Leaves; KIA 17 July 1943
Heinz Ewald	Leutnant	84/83	JG 5, JG 52	Knight's Cross
Wolfgang Ewald	Major	78 (incl. 1 in Spain)/65	JG 52, JG 3	Knight's Cross
Waldemar Eyrich*	Feldwebwel	36	JG 53, JG 3	KIA 11 April 1944

=== F ===
Name	Rank	Claims	Unit	Notes
Helmut Fahlbusch*	Leutnant	6	ZG 76	KIA 1 May 1940
Hans Fahrenberger	Feldwebel	8	JG 27, JGr Süd	
Gottfried Fahrmann	Leutnant	7	JG 77, JG 7, JV 44	
Wolfgang Falck	Oberst	7	ZG 1, NJG 1	Knight's Cross
Horst-Günther von Fassong*	Hauptmann	136/75–136/63	JG 51, JG 11	Knight's Cross; KIA 1 January 1945
Hans-Joachim Fast	Unteroffizier	5	JG 26	
Josef Federle	Oberfeldwebel	7	NJG 6	WIA 14/15 March 1945
Leopold Fellerer	Hauptmann	41/36/35	NJG 1, NJG 2, NJG 5, NJG 6	Knight's Cross
Georg Fengler	Oberleutnant	16/14	NJG 1	
Walter Fenske*	Hauptmann	15	LG 1, NJG 1, NJG 4, NJG 2, NJG 5, NJG 100, NJGr 10	Died at 27 March 1944 due to injuries sustained in a non-operational crash at 26 March
Frithjof Fensch	Leutnant	12	NJG 4	
Heinz Ferger*	Hauptmann	19	NJG 1, NJG 3, NJG 2	KIA 9/10 April 1945 on approach to Lübeck-Blankensee
Herbert Findeisen	Hauptmann	67	JG 54	Knight's Cross
Günter Fink*	Hauptmann	56/46/48	JG 54	including 11 aerial victories as a night fighter Knight's Cross; MIA 15 May 1943
August Fischer	Hauptmann	12/10	NJG 5, NJG 100	
Siegfried Fischer	Oberfeldwebel	15	StG 1, SG 1	Knight's Cross
Kurt Fladrich	Hauptmann	15	NJG 1, NJG 4	
Erwin Fleig	Leutnant	66/55+	JG 51	Knight's Cross
Otto Fönnekold*	Oberleutnant	136/134	JG 52	Knight's Cross; KIA 31 August 1944
Hermann Förster*	Oberfeldwebel	13/12	11.(N)/JG 2, NJG 1, JG 27	KIA 14 December 1941
Josef Förster	Oberleutnant	15	NJG 2, NJG 3	
Paul Förster	Major	8	ZG 26, NJG 1	
Josef Fözö	Major	27 (3 incl. Spain)/23	JG 51, JG 108	Knight's Cross
Gustav Francsi	Leutnant	56/60/59	NJG 200, NJG 100	Knight's Cross
Hans-Dieter Frank*	Major	55/53/51	ZG 1, NJG 1	Knight's Cross with Oak Leaves; KIA 27/28 September 1943
Heinz Frank*	Major	8	LG 2, SG 1, SG 2, SG 151	Knight's Cross with Oak Leaves; DOW 7 October 1944
Rudolf Frank*	Leutnant	46/45/43	NJG 3	Knight's Cross with Oak Leaves; KIA 26/27 April 1944
Alfred Franke*	Leutnant	60/59/58	JG 53	Knight's Cross; KIA 9 September 1942
Richard Franz	Oberleutnant	15	JG 27, JG 77, JG 3, JG 11	
Ludwig Franzisket	Major	43/39	JG 27	Knight's Cross
Max Franzisket*	Hauptmann	6+	ZG 76, JG 77, JG 5, ZG 1	MIA 19 July 1943
Hans Frese	Leutnant	44	JG 3	
Wilhelm Freuwörth	Oberfeldwebel	58/48	JG 52, JG 26	Knight's Cross
Hugo Frey*	Hauptmann	32/17	JG 11, JG 1	Knight's Cross; KIA 6 March 1944
Siegfried Freytag	Major	102/89	JG 77	Knight's Cross
Herbert Friebel*	Leutnant	58/57	JG 51	Knight's Cross; KIA 15 May 1944
Gerhard Friedrich*	Major	30/29	NJG 2, NJG 1, NJG 4, NJG 6	Knight's Cross; KIA 16 March 1945
Günther Friedrich*	Hauptmann	6	NJG 4, NJG 1	KIA 27/28 September 1943
Gustav Frielinghaus	Hauptmann	74/69	JG 3	Knight's Cross
Heinz de Fries	Oberfeldwebel	10	NJG 100	
Otto Fries	Leutnant	15	NJG 1	
Hans-Jürgen Frölich	Feldwebel	5	JG 26	
Karl Fuchs*	Leutnant	67/64	JG 54	KIA 10 October 1943
Robert Fuchs	Oberfeldwebel	39/23/17+	JG 51, JG 54	
Erich Führmann	Oberfeldwebel	5	JG 11	
Heinrich Füllgrabe*	Oberleutnant	65/63	JG 52	Knight's Cross; KIA 30 January 1945
Erich Führmann	Oberfeldwebel	5	JG 11	
Ralph Furch	Leutnant	31/30	JG 51	
Georg Fureder	Leutnant	26/22	JG 54, JG 11	
Hans Fuß*	Leutnant	71/69	JG 3	Knight's Cross; KIFA 10 November 1942
Hugo Fütscher	Feldwebel	5	NJG 3	PoW night of 31 December 1944 - 1 January 1945
