= List of World War II aces from Germany: T–Z =

This is a list of fighter aces in World War II from Germany with their surname starting from T to Z. A flying ace or fighter ace is a military aviator credited with shooting down five or more enemy aircraft during aerial combat. Aces are listed alphabetically by last name.

== Aces ==
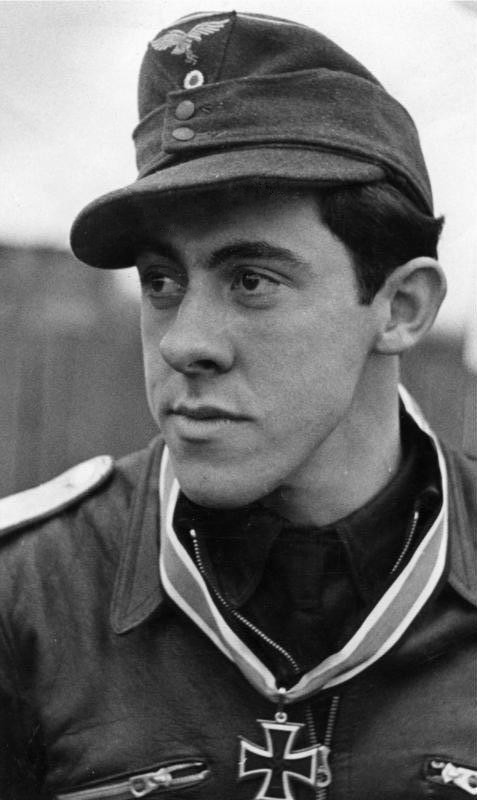
Gerhard Thyben, 157 claims

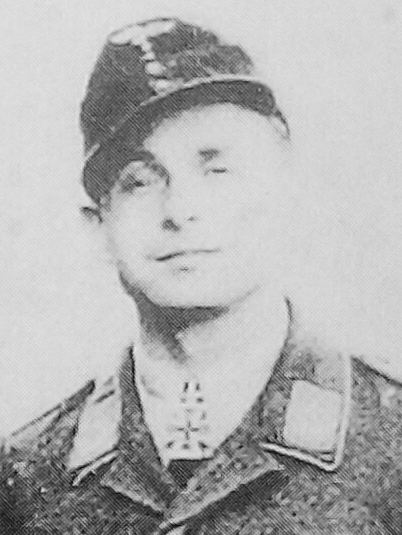
Willy Unger, 22 heavy bombers

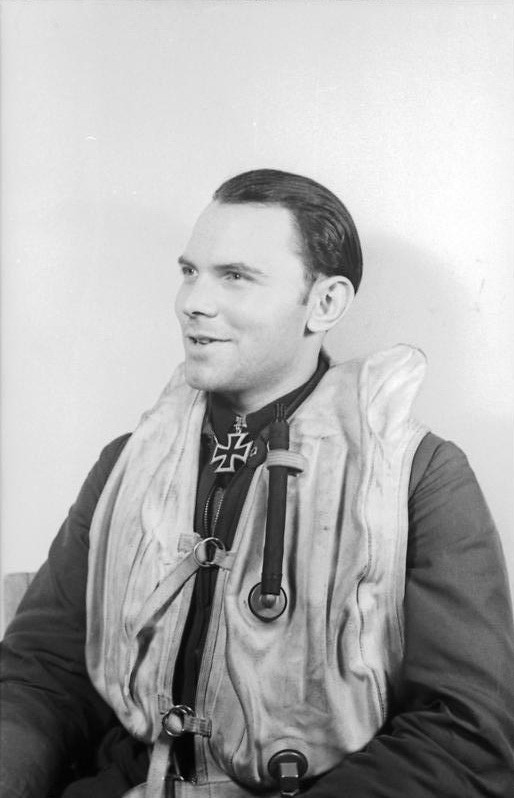
Heinz Vinke, night fighter pilot

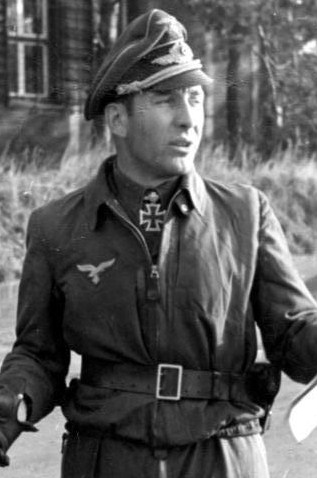
Theodor Weissenberger, 206 claims

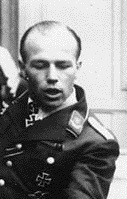
Helmut Wick, the leading Luftwaffe fighter pilot when killed in action

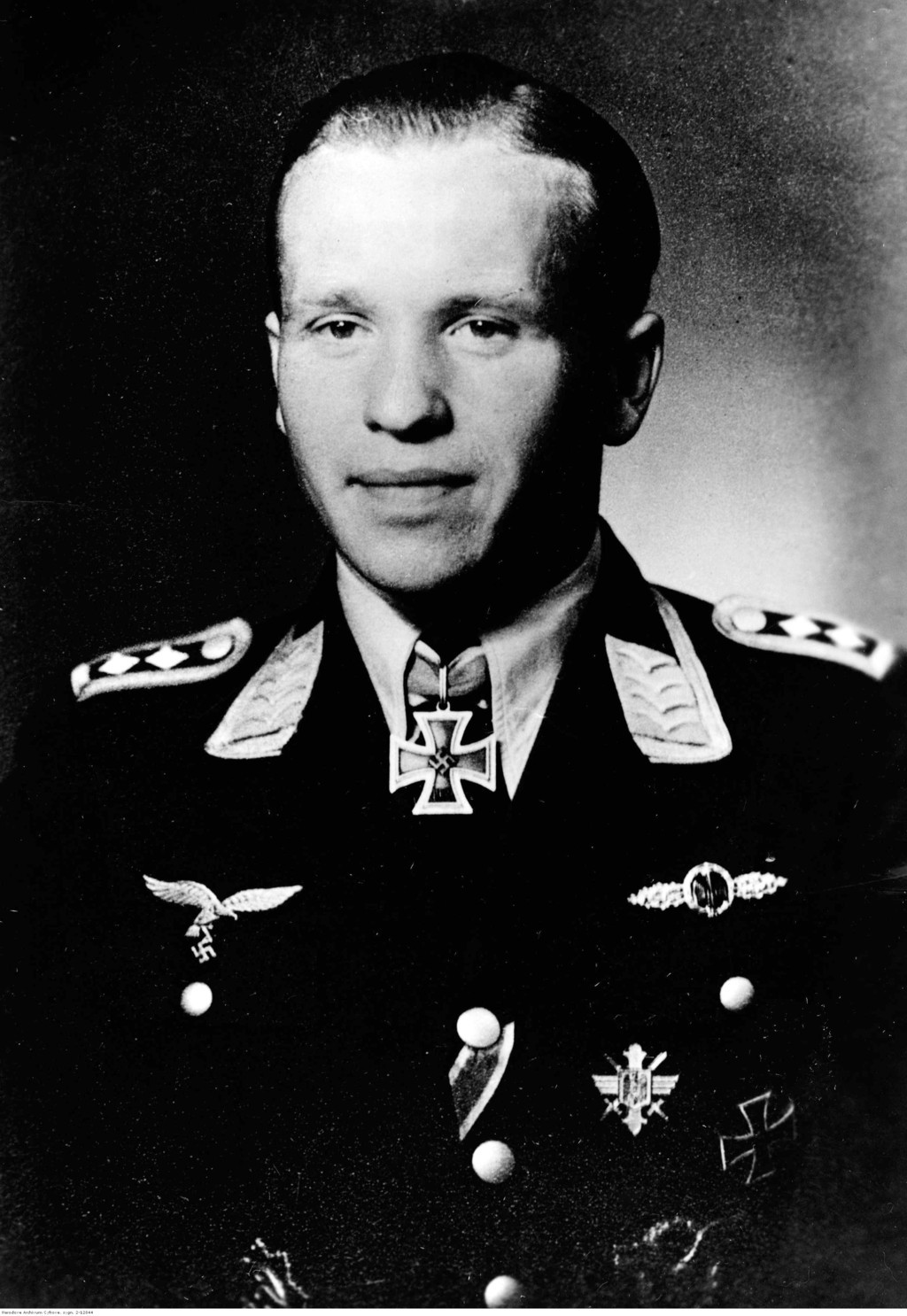
Josef Zwernemann, 126 claims

By surname: A–F • G–L • M–P • Q–S

This along with the * (asterisk), indicates that the pilot was either killed in action (KIA), missing in action (MIA), died of wounds (DOW), killed in a flying accident (KIFA), or killed in a car accident (KICA).
This and the / (slash) indicates information discrepancies listed by Aders, Boiten, Caldwell, Girbig, Held, Obermaier, Prien, Spick, Ring, Mathews, Foreman and Zabecki.

=== T ===
Name	Rank	Claims	Unit	Notes
Heinrich Tammen*	Unteroffizier	19	JG 52	KIA 30 November 1944
Otto Tange*	Oberleutnant	68/63	JG 51	Knight's Cross; KIA 30 July 1943
Hermann Tangerding*	Oberleutnant	7	NAGr 21, JG 27	KIA 31 August 1942
Kurt Tangermann	Leutnant	45	JG 54, JG 52	
Ewald Tankink	Oberfeldwebel	8+	LG 2	German Cross
Kurt Tanzer	Leutnant	143/35+	JG 51	Knight's Cross
Hans-Ulrich Tartsch*	Leutnant	5	JGr West, JG 2	KIA 8 June 1944
Rudolf Täschner*	Oberfeldwebel	20	JG 53, JG 2	KIA 28 August 1943
Hans Taubenberger	Oberleutnant	34/13+	JG 51	
Gabriel Tautscher*	Unteroffizier	58/55	JG 51	German Cross; KIA 12 January 1944
Fritz Tegtmeier	Oberleutnant	146	JG 54, JG 7	Knight's Cross
Waldemar Teige*	Oberleutnant	12	KG 53	Knight's Cross; KIA 3 October 1942
Wilhelm Telge*	Hauptmann	14/13	NJG 1	KIA 1 September 1943
Paul Temme	Oberleutnant	5	JG 2, JG 27	
Ernst Terry*	Oberleutnant	10/9 (incl. 2 in Spain)	J/88, JG 51	KIA 29 October 1940
Herbert Ter Steegen*	Feldwebel	10–12	NJG 5	KIA 24 May 1944
Otto Teschner*	Leutnant	6	NJG 1	KIFA 25 December 1944
Gerd Tetteroo	Leutnant	8	JG 51	
Helmut Tetzner	Fahnenjunker-Feldwebel	7+	NAGr 5	
Alfred Teumer*	Oberleutnant	76/74	JG 54, JG 7	Knight's Cross; KIFA 4 October 1944 mission-to-claim ratio of 3.95.
Hans Tewes	Unteroffizier	5	JG 53	
Bruno Tezzele*	Unteroffizier	13	JG 54	MIA 14 September 1944
Karl Thaler*	Leutnant	27	JG 54	KIA 23 November 1944
Gustav Tham	Hauptmann	14	NJG 5, NJG 10	
Willi Theimann*	Leutnant	45/42	JG 51	German Cross; MIA 29 July 1943
Hans Theis	Feldwebel	7	JG 300, JG 7	
Ludwig Theopold*	Oberleutnant	10	JG 77	KFIA 26 January 1943
Edwin Thiel*	Hauptmann	76/71	JG 52, JG 51	Knight's Cross; KIA 14 July 1944
Werner Thielen*	Leutnant	10	JG 54	KIA 12 June 1944
Werner Thierfelder*	Hauptmann	27	ZG 26	Knight's Cross; KIFA 18 July 1944
Oskar Thimm	Feldwebel	7	JG 5	
Wolfgang Thimmig	Oberstleutnant	23	NJG 1, NJG 2, NJG 4	German Cross
Ernst Thoma	Unteroffizier	7	JG 77	
Hans Thomann*	Unteroffizier	8	JG 5	KIA 19 August 1943
Erich Thomas	Oberleutnant	15+/12	JG 52	
Helmut Thomas*	Leutnant	8	JG 52	KIA 12 January 1944
Friedrich Thorl*	Oberleutnant	6	NJG 4	KIA 13 September 1944
Franz Thümer*	Unteroffizier	5	JG 3	KIA 27 December 1942
Rudolf Thun	Oberleutnant	7| 5+	NJG 5, NJG 6	
Heinrich Thüroff	Leutnant	8/5	JG 53	
Gerhard Thyben	Oberleutnant	157	JG 3, JG 54	Knight's Cross with Oak Leaves mission-to-claim ratio of 2.45.
Ekkehard Tichy*	Hauptmann	25	JG 53, JG 3	Knight's Cross; KIA 16 August 1944
Helmut Tiedmann	Hauptmann	7	JG 3	
Horst Tietzen*	Hauptmann	27 (incl. 7 in Spain)	JG 51	Knight's Cross; KIA 18 August 1940
Hans Tilly*	Oberfeldwebel	7	JG 2	KIA 7 July 1941
Horst Timme*	Unteroffizier	13	JG 52	KIA 28 August 1943
Manfred Tischtau*	Oberleutnant	9/5	NJG 5	KIFA 20 August 1944
Werner Tismar*	Hauptmann	5	LG 2, JG 77	KIFA 26 April 1942
Joachim Titze*	Feldwebel	25	JG 54	KIA 29 April 1943
Johann-Jobst Todt	Oberfeldwebel	10	JG 301, JG 7	
Günther Toll	Oberfeldwebel	47+	JG 2, JG 52	German Cross
Günther Tonne*	Major	~20	SKG 210, SKG 10, ZG 1	Knight's Cross with Oak Leaves; KIA 15 July 1943
Wolfgang Tonne*	Hauptmann	122/120	JG 53	Knight's Cross with Oak Leaves; KIA 20 April 1943
Hans Torfer*	Leutnant	7	JG 27, JGr Süd	KIA 11 September 1944
Heinz Tornow*	Leutnant	12/8 (incl. 2 in Spain)	J/88, JG 51	KIA 29 October 1940
Willi Trabert	Leutnant	6	JG 27	
Rudolf Traphan*	Oberfeldwebel	8	JG 3	KIA 11 April 1944
Eduard Tratt*	Major	38/35	ZG 1, ZG 26	Knight's Cross with Oak Leaves; KIA 22 February 1944
Hannes Trautloft	Oberst	58 (incl. 5 in Spain)	JG 51, JG 54	Knight's Cross
Johann Trenke	Feldwebel	9	KG 51	Knight's Cross
Rudolf Trenkel	Hauptmann	138/132	JG 77, JG 52	Knight's Cross mission-to-claim ratio of 3.62.
Günther Treptau*	Oberfeldwebel	5	JG 11	KIA 4 January 1945
Horst Trepte*	Leutnant	7	JG 52	MIA 3 August 1943
Johannes Trestler*	Oberfeldwebel	5+	ZG 1, ZG 26	KIA 31 January 1945
Eberhard Graf von Treuberg*	Oberleutnant	17	JG 3, JG 52	KIA 1 January 1945
Werner Treusch*	Leutnant	5	Kommando Herrmann, JG 300	KIFA 3 January 1944
Willi Tritsch	Oberleunant	20/12	LG 2, SG 1, SG 151, SG 152	Knight's Cross
Franz Trowal*	Leutnant	7	JG 77	KIA 15 July 1944
Hans Trübenbach	Major	8	JG 132, JG 52, LG 2	
Martin Tschiersch*	Leutnant	11	NJG 2	KIA 21 February 1945
Kurt Tyralla*	Unteroffizier	7+	LG 2, SG 1, SG 2	KIA 7 September 1942

=== U ===
Name	Rank	Claims	Unit	Notes
Kurt "Kuddel" Ubben*	Major	111/110/93	JG 77, JG 2	Knight's Cross with Oak Leaves; KIA 27 April 1944
Richard Ubelbacher*	Feldwebel	7	JG 2	KIA 3 March 1943
Hans-Joachim Uhl*	Unteroffizier	5	JG 54	KIA 11 August 1943
Lothar Uhlig*	Oberfeldwebel	8	ZG 1, JG 76	KIA 25 August 1944
Martin Uhlmann	Feldwebel	5	NJG 4	
Friedrich Graf von Uiberacker*	Leutnant	7	JG 26	KIA 6 December 1942
Martin Ulbrich	Oberfeldwebel	35+/32+	JG 51	
Albert Ullrich	Feldwebel	11	JG 77, JGr Süd	
Günter Ulrich*	Fähnrich	5	JG 27, JG 7	KIA 25 March 1945
Horst Ulenberg*	Leutnant	16	JG 26	KIA 12 July 1941
Hans Umbach*	Oberfeldwebel	5	JG 1, JG 27	KIFA 27 June 1941
Johanes Ungar	Unteroffizier	5	JG 52	
Willy Unger	Leutnant	21	JG 3, JG 7	Knight's Cross
Oswald Unterlerchner	Leutnant	11+	JG 54	
Robert Unzeitig*	Leutnant	10/9	JG 26	KIA 12 April 1942
Werner Ursinus	Hauptmann	5	JG 53	
Ludwig Uschmann	Unteroffizier	5	JG 54	

=== V ===
Name	Rank	Claims	Unit	Notes
Martin von Vacano	Oberleutnant	8	JG 53, JGr Süd	
Heinrich Vandeweerd	Oberfähnrich	6	JG 26	
Bernhard Vechtel	Oberleutnant	108	JG 51	Knight's Cross
Ulrich Veh*	Oberfeldwebel	5	JG 300	KIFA 8 March 1944
Otto Venjakob*	Unteroffizier	25	JG 54	KIA 23 June 1944
Heinz Venth*	Oberleutnant	17/14	JG 51	MIA 16 July 1944
Erich Viebahn	Hauptmann	5	JG 51, JG 50, JGr Süd	
Helmut Viedebantt*	Major	23	ZG 1, SG 10	Knight's Cross; KIA 1 May 1945
Martin Villing	Oberfeldwebel	19+	JG 77, JG 5	
Heinz Vinke*	Oberfeldwebel	54/51	NJG 1	Knight's Cross with Oak Leaves; KIA 26 February 1944
Otto Vinzent*	Oberleutnant	45	JG 54	KIA 4 January 1944
Hermann Virchow	Oberfeldwebel	5	SKG 10	
Gerhard Vivroux*	Feldwebel	10	JG 3	KIA 25 October 1944
Karl Vockelmann*	Leutnant	9/8	JG 53	KIA 19 May 1943
Karl-Heinrich Vögel*	Leutnant	7	JG 5	MIA 16 January 1944
Veit Vögel	Stabs Adjutant	7	JG 51	
Wolfgang Vögel*	Unteroffizier	21	JG 3	MIA 1 August 1942
Ferdinand Vögl	Hauptmann	33/29	JG 27	German Cross
Heinz Völker*	Leutnant	9/8	NJG 2	KIA 22 July 1944
Helmut Vogel	Fahnenjunker-Oberfeldwebel	10	JG 53	
Heinz-Gerhard Vogt*	Oberleutnant	48/47	JG 26	Knight's Cross; KIA 14 January 1945 mission-to-claim ratio of 3.63.
Dieter Voigt	Feldwebel	17	SG 2	German Cross
Maximilian Volke*	Oberfeldwebel	36	JG 77	German Cross; Remains of plane and pilot found in 2007 near Modena, Italy.
Wilhelm-Erich Volkmann*	Oberleutnant	8	JG 51, JG 3	KIA 2 December 1944
Hans Vollet	Leutnant	5	JG 5	
Karl-Heinz Völlkopf*	Leutnant	6	NJG 2, NJG 1	KIA 21 June 1943
Hans Vorhauer*	Feldwebel	8	JG 1	KIA 10 October 1943
Kurt Votel*	Leutnant	9	JG 2	DOW 4 May 1941

=== W ===
Name	Rank	Claims	Unit	Notes
Friedrich Wachowiak*	Leutnant	140/86	JG 52, JG 3	Knight's Cross; KIA 16 July 1944
Edmund Wagner*	Oberfeldwebel	58/57	JG 51	Knight's Cross; KIA 13 November 1941
Erich Wagner*	Leutnant	6	JG 53	KIA 21 October 1943
Gerhard Wagner	Leutnant	13	NJG 5	
Rudolf Wagner*	Leutnant	81	JG 51	Knight's Cross; MIA 11 December 1943
Harry Wald	Feldwebel	10+	JG 3	
Hans Waldmann*	Oberleutnant	134/131	JG 52, JG 3, JG 7	Knight's Cross; KIFA 18 March 1945 mission-to-claim ratio of 3.93.
Ernst Wallner*	Hauptmann	5	NJG 6	KIA 4 December 1944
Otto Wallner*	Feldwebel	12	JG 51	KIFA 28 August 1943
Karl-Heinz Wallrath*	Unteroffizier	5	JG 3	KIA 13 February 1942
Alfred Wallys*	Unteroffizier	5	JG 51	KIFA 8 October 1943
Adolf Walter*	Oberfeldwebel	5	JG 52	MIA 1 September 1941
Albert Walter*	Oberleutnant	37/35	JG 51	German Cross; KIA 13 July 1944
Albert Walter*	Oberleutnant	10	NJG 4, NJG 6	KIA 24 February 1944
Gustav Walter*	Feldwebel	7	JG 54	KIA 16 April 1942
Clemens Walterscheid*	Leutnant	8	JG 2	KIA 2 July 1943
Horst Walther	Oberleutnant	35/34	JG 51	German Cross
Rudolf Walther	Leutnant	22+	JG 52	
Albrecht Walz*	Oberleutnant	26	JG 3	German Cross; KIA 11 April 1943
Siegfried Wandam*	Oberleutnant	14	NJG 1, NJG 5	KIA 4 July 1943
Joachim Wandel*	Hauptmann	75	JG 54	Knight's Cross; KIA 7 October 1942
Rudi Wangner*	Hauptmann	5	ZG 1	KIA 27 June 1944
Alfred Warrelmann	Feldwebel	6	ZG 1, NJG 3, NJG 2	
Erich Wassermann*	Feldwebel	7	JG 27	KIA 22 December 1941
Joachim Weber*	Leutnant	11	ZG 26, JG 7	KIA 21 March 1945
Karl-Heinz Weber*	Hauptmann	136/132	JG 51, JG 1	Knight's Cross with Oak Leaves; KIA 7 June 1944 mission-to-claim ratio of 3.68.
Karl-Heinz Weber*	Unteroffizier	31	JG 51	KIFA 22 September 1943
Hermann Weeber	Hauptmann	5	ZG 76	
Heinrich Wefers*	Oberfeldwebel	51	JG 54	German Cross; KIA 18 May 1943
Günther Wegmann	Oberleutnant	14	ZG 26, EKdo 262, JG 7	German Cross
Alfred Wehmeyer*	Oberleutnant	18	ZG 26	Knight's Cross; KIA 1 June 1942
Herbert Wehnelt	Hauptmann	25	JG 20, JG 51, EJGr West	German Cross
Joachim von Wehren	Oberleutnant	9	JG 77	
Josef Weichmann	Feldwebel	5	JG 4	
Bruno Weidlich	Feldwebel	30	JG 77	German Cross
Kurt Weigand*	Feldwebel	7	JG 300	KIA 24 August 1944
Hans-Dieter Weihs	Leutnant	8	JG 7	
Hans Weik	Hauptmann	36	JG 3, EJGr Ost, EJG 2	Knight's Cross mission-to-claim ratio of 2.78.
Leoplod Weinberger*	Unteroffizier	5	NJG 4	KIA 28 April 1944
Emil Weinmann	Feldwebel	10	NJG 6	
Walter Weinzierl*	Gefreiter	5	JG 302	KIA 28 July 1944
Gustav Weippert	Oberfeldwebel	7+	NAG 4	Knight's Cross
Ernst Weismann*	Oberleutnant	69	JG 51	Knight's Cross; MIA 13 August 1942 mission-to-claim ratio of 3.74.
Robert "Bazi" Weiss*	Hauptmann	121/122	JG 54	Knight's Cross with Oak Leaves; KIA 29 December 1944
Theodor "Theo" Weissenberger	Major	208	JG 5, JG 7	Knight's Cross with Oak Leaves mission-to-claim ratio of 2.40.
Paul-Adolf Weitzberg*	Leutnant	5	JG 5, JG 4	KIA 2 November 1944
Hugo Welsch*	Feldwebel	28	JG 54	KIA 29 October 1944
Kurt Welter	Oberleutnant	63	JG 300, NJGr 10, NJG 11	Knight's Cross with Oak Leaves
Rupert Weninger*	Oberleutnant	11	JG 53	KIA 24 June 1944
Hans-Gerd Wennekers	Oberfeldwebel	11	JG 11	
Eberhard Wenninger*	Leutnant	8	JG 51	KIA 16 April 1944
Werner Wenzel	Hauptmann	8	JG 27, JG 3, JG 7	
Peter Werfft, Dr.	Major	26	JG 27	Knight's Cross
Adolf Wermter	Gefreiter	11+	JG 54	
Horst Wernecke*	Unteroffizier	5	JG 51, JG 302	KIA 29 July 1944
Otto Werner*	Hauptmann	10	JG 2	KIA 17 March 1943
Otto Werner	Unteroffizier	15	NAG 4, JG 77	
Heinz Wernicke*	Leutnant	117/118	JG 54	Knight's Cross; KIFA 27 December 1944
Ulrich Wernitz	Leutnant	101	JG 54	Knight's Cross mission-to-claim ratio of 2.38.
Franz von Werra*	Hauptmann	21	JG 3, JG 53	Knight's Cross; KIFA 25 October 1941
Johannes Werth	Hauptmann	8	NJG 2	
Johann Werthner	Feldwebel	7	NJG 2, NJG 3	
Otto Weßling*	Oberleutnant	83	JG 3	Knight's Cross with Oak Leaves; KIA 19 April 1944
Helmut Wester*	Oberleutnant	10	JG 52	KIA 17 August 1944
Josef Westner*	Leutnant	6	JG 51	KIA 10 August 1943
Hans-Jürgen Westphal	Hauptmann	13	JG 26, EJGr West, JG 53, JG 106	
Helmut Wettstein	Hauptmann	20+	JG 54, JGr Ost	
Walther Wever*	Oberleutnant	44	JG 51, JG 7	Knight's Cross; KIFA 10 April 1945
Hubert-York Weydenhammer*	Hauptmann	6	LG 1, JG 3	KIA 25 December 1944
Gerhard Weyl	Oberleutnant	8+	JG 5, JG 6	
Helmut Wichmann	Feldwebel	5	JG 3	
Helmut Wick*	Major	56	JG 2	Knight's Cross with Oak Leaves; MIA 28 November 1940
Karl Wick	Oberfeldwebel	7+	JG 54, JG 11	
Bruno Wickert	Feldwebel	5	JG 52	
Fritz-Dietrich Wickop*	Hauptmann	12	JG 52, JG 2, JG 1	KIA 16 May 1943
Wulf-Dietrich Widowitz*	Oberleutnant	29	ZG 76, JG 77, JG 5	German Cross; KIA 28 July 1943
Gerhard Wiegand	Leutnant	25	JG 26	German Cross
Heinrich-Friedrich Wiegand	Feldwebel	9	JG 5	
Werner Wiegand*	Feldwebel	6	JG 1	KIA 29 March 1944
Edmund Wieland	Feldwebel	7	JG 27	
Paul Wielebinski*	Feldwebel	5	JG 3	DOW 25 June 1944
Franz-Josef Wienhusen*	Hauptmann	6	JG 5, JG 77, EJGr Ost, JG 4	KIA 3 December 1944
Johannes Wiese	Major	133/118	JG 52, JG 77	Knight's Cross with Oak Leaves; 12 in one mission
Reinhard Wiese*	Unteroffizier	9	JG 3	KIA 29 October 1942
Wilhelm Wiesinger*	Oberleutnant	10	JG 27	KIA 23 June 1941
Gustav Wiesmahr*	Leutnant	20	JG 52	KIFA 5 October 1943
Ernst Wiggers*	Hauptmann	9	JG 51	KIA 11 September 1940
Wolf-Dietrich Wilcke*	Oberst	162/155	JG 53, JG 3	Knight's Cross with Oak Leaves and Swords; KIA 23 March 1944
Karl-Heinz Wilke	Oberleutnant	8	NAG 4	Knight's Cross
Gerhard Wille	Feldwebel	13	JG 51	MIA 10 February 1942
Egbert Willenbrink	Unteroffizier	7	JG 53	
Dieter Willers	Unteroffizier	11	JG 51	
Karl Willius*	Oberleutnant	50	JG 26	Knight's Cross; KIA 8 April 1944
Alexander von Winterfelt*	Oberstleutnant	13	JG 2, JG 77	Knight's Cross; KIFA 16 May 1942
Eugen Wintergerst*	Oberfeldwebel	8	JG 77, JG 1	KIA 4 September 1943
Hermann Wischnewski	Oberfähnrich	28	JG 300	Knight's Cross
Heinrich Wohlers*	Major	29	NJG 4, NJG 6	Knight's Cross; KIFA 15 March 1944
Ulrich Wöhnert	Leutnant	86	JG 54	Knight's Cross
Franz Woidich	Oberleutnant	110/81	JG 27, JG 52, JG 400	Knight's Cross
Erich Woitke	Hauptmann	26 (+4 in Spain)	J/88, JG 3, JG 52, JG 77, JG 27, JG 11, JG 300, JG 1	German Cross in Gold
Albin Wolf*	Oberleutnant	144/142	JG 54	Knight's Cross with Oak Leaves; KIA 22 April 1944
Hermann Wolf	Leutnant	57/55	JG 52, JG 11, JG 7	Knight's Cross
Robert Wolf	Leutnant	33	NJG 5	
Walter Wolfrum	Oberleutnant	137/134	JG 52	Knight's Cross mission-to-claim ratio of 3.09.
Helmut Woltersdorf*	Oberleutnant	23	NJG 1	German Cross; KIA 2 June 1942
Waldemar Wübke	Hauptmann	14	JG 54, JG 101	German Cross
Helmut Wunderlich	Obergefreiter	7	JG 77	
Horst Wunderlich*	Leutnant	13	JG 51	KIA 30 November 1942
Karl Wünsch*	Leutnant	22/20	JG 27	German Cross; MIA 21 November 1944
Karl Wunschelmeyer*	Oberleutnant	16	JG 54, JG 26	KIA 24 February 1944
Otto Würfel*	Leutnant	79/77	JG 51	Knight's Cross; MIA 23 February 1944
Heinz Wurm*	Oberleutnant	12	ZG 1	KIA 16 September 1943
Josef "Sepp" Wurmheller*	Major	102/103	JG 53, JG 2	Knight's Cross with Oak Leaves and Swords; KIA 22 June 1944
Wilhelm Würtz	Unteroffizier	6	JG 54, JG 26	
Heinrich Wurzel	Hauptmann	12	JG 302, JG 301	German Cross

=== Z ===
Name	Rank	Claims	Unit	Notes
Hans Zacher*	Feldwebel	6	JG 51	KIA 17 October 1944
Friedrich Zander*	Oberfeldwebel	34	JG 54, JG 1	incl. 1 heavy bomber KIA 26 December 1944
Ernst Zechlin	Hauptmann	10/8	NJG 2, NJG 5	
Karl-Ludwig Zeddies*	Feldwebel	7	JG 51	KIA 26 March 1943
Otmar Zehart*	Oberleutnant	6	Sturmstaffel 1, JG 3, JG 4	incl. 6 heavy bombers KIA 26 December 1944
Josef Zeiner*	Fähnrich	5	JG 3	incl. 5 heavy bombers KIA 3 March 1945
Alfred Zeis	Leutnant	53	JG 53	
Joachim Zeller	Fahnenjunker-Feldwebel	6	JG 26	
Walter Zellot*	Leutnant	85/84	JG 53	Knight's Cross; KIA 10 September 1942 mission-to-claim ratio of 3.48.
Ulrich Zemper*	Feldwebel	6	JG 53	KIA 28 July 1944
Emil Zibler*	Feldwebel	35	JG 3	KIA 5 July 1943
Siegfried Zick	Leutnant	20	JG 1, JG 11	
Kurt Ziegenfuss*	Feldwebel	6	JG 51	KIA 22 April 1944
Helmut Ziegenhagen	Oberleutnant	15	JG 76, JG 5, JG 54, JG 11	
Helmut Ziehm*	Oberleutnant	20	JG 51	KIA 9 April 1945
Kurt Ziemann*	Oberfeldwebel	6+	SG 4	KIA 23 January 1945
Heinz Ziemer	Feldwebel	6	JG 11	
Helmut Zilken*	Oberleutnant	12	JG 54	KIA 16 March 1942
Horst Ziller	Oberfeldwebel	8	JG 27	
Günther Zilling*	Oberfähnrich	6	JG 54	KIA 2 August 1944
Herbert Zimmer*	Feldwebel	20	JG 3	incl. 1 heavy bomber KIA 20 March 1944
Claus Zimmermann*	Leutnant	7	JG 52	KIA 29 July 1942
Hans-Jörg Zimmermann*	Oberleutnant	6	JG 52	KIA 1 September 1941
Oskar Zimmermann	Leutnant	34/28+	JG 51, JG 3	Knight's Cross
Dieter Zink	Leutnant	11	JG 3	incl. 10 heavy bombers
Füllbert Zink*	Hauptmann	36	JG 26	German Cross; KIA 14 March 1943
Igor Zirkenbach*	Leutnant	7/6	JG 27	KIA 8 August 1940
Josef Zirngibl*	Oberfeldwebel	9	JG 26	incl. 3 heavy bombers KIA 21 June 1944
Paul Zorner	Major	59/58	NJG 2, NJG 3, NJG 100, NJG 5	Knight's Cross with Oak Leaves
Franz-Josef Zoufahl*	Oberfeldwebel	26	JG 51	German Cross; KIA 24 July 1944
Gerhard Zschäbitz	Feldwebel	12	JG 52	
Herwig Zusig*	Oberleutnant	12	JG 77, JG 1	KIA 19 August 1943
Eugen-Ludwig Zweigart*	Oberleutnant	69/66	JG 54	Knight's Cross; KIA 12 January 1943
Josef Zwernemann*	Hauptmann	126/123	JG 52, JG 11	Knight's Cross with Oak Leaves incl. 5 heavy bombers KIA 8 April 1944
Rudi Zwesken	Oberfeldwebel	45~/23+	JG 52, JG 300	incl. 14+ heavy bombers Knight's Cross
Ludwig Zwittnig*	Oberleutnant	6	JG 3	incl. 2 heavy bombers KIA 18 April 1945
