= Otto Würfel =

WWII Luftwaffe fighter ace

- Würfel as an Oberfeldwebel
- Born: 3 December 1920
- Died: 22 December 1944 (aged 24); POW camp
- Burial place: German War Cemetery Donetsk
- Military career
- Allegiance: Nazi Germany
- Branch: Luftwaffe
- Service years: 1939–1944
- Rank: Leutnant posthumous
- Unit: JG 51
- Conflicts: World War II; Eastern Front
- Awards: Knight's Cross of the Iron Cross

Otto Würfel (3 December 1920 – 22 December 1944) was a former Luftwaffe fighter ace and recipient of the Knight's Cross of the Iron Cross during World War II. Würfel was credited with 79 aerial victories all over the Eastern Front (World War II). In 1944 his aircraft had a mid air collision with another Luftwaffe aircraft over the Rogachev–Zhlobin offensive and he was captured by the Russians and died in a POW camp.

== Career ==
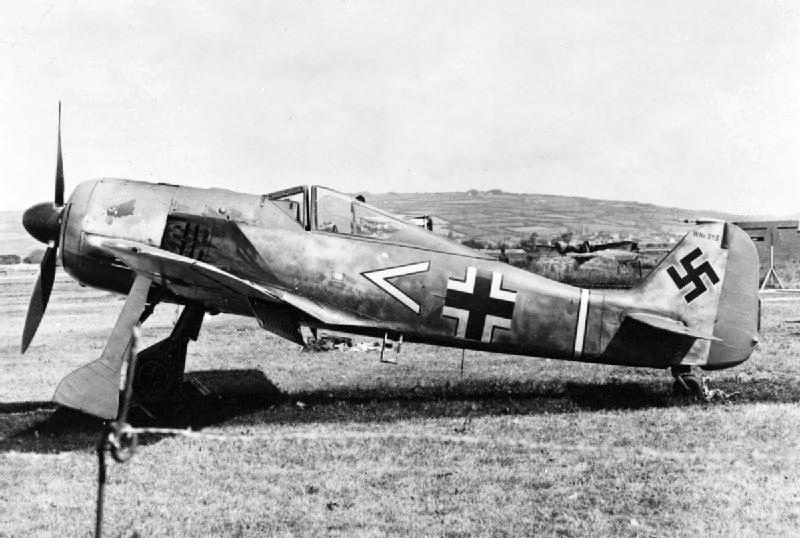
Würfel crashed while piloting his Focke-Wulf Fw 190 over Russia (Note: It is not known how many different aircraft Würfel flew while accumulating his 79 kills, his unit was known for flying the Messerschmitt Bf 109 in 1943.)

On 10 March 1939, Würfel was assigned to 9. Staffel (9th squadron) of Jagdgeschwader 51 (JG 51—51st Fighter Wing). In the fall of 1943, Würfel was briefly transferred to Ergänzungs-Jagdgruppe Ost, a fighter pilot training unit for pilots destined for the Eastern Front, as an instructor.

On 23 February 1944, Würfel was piloting his Focke-Wulf Fw 190 A-5 (Werknummer 2599—factory number) over Rogachev when he Luftwaffe pilot, Oberfeldwebel Heinrich Dittlmann flying Fw 190 A-5 (Werknummer 2555) were involved in a mid-air collision. Following the collision, Dittlmann was reported as missing in action while Würfel bailed out over Soviet held territory. Taken prisoner of war, he contracted Typhus and died on 22 December 1944 at Camp 280/5 near Stalino. On 4 May 1944 while in Soviet captivity, Würfel had been awarded the Knight's Cross of the Iron Cross (Ritterkreuz des Eisernen Kreuzes) for his 79 aerial victories claimed.

== Summary of career ==
=== Aerial victory claims ===
According to US historian David T. Zabecki, Würfel was credited with 79 aerial victories. Mathews and Foreman, authors of Luftwaffe Aces – Biographies and Victory Claims, researched the German Federal Archives and found documentation for 77 aerial victory claims, all of which claimed on the Eastern Front.

Victory claims were logged to a map-reference (PQ = Planquadrat), for example "PQ 47731". The Luftwaffe grid map (Jägermeldenetz) covered all of Europe, western Russia and North Africa and was composed of rectangles measuring 15 minutes of latitude by 30 minutes of longitude, an area of about 360 square miles (930 km^{2}). These sectors were then subdivided into 36 smaller units to give a location area 3 km × 4 km (1.9 mi × 2.5 mi) in size.

Chronicle of aerial victories
This and the ♠ (Ace of spades) indicates those aerial victories which made Würfel an "ace-in-a-day", a term which designates a fighter pilot who has shot down five or more airplanes in a single day. This and the ? (question mark) indicates information discrepancies listed by Prien, Stemmer, Rodeike, Balke, Bock, Mathews and Foreman.
Claim	Date	Time	Type	Location	Claim	Date	Time	Type	Location
– 9. Staffel of Jagdgeschwader 51 "Mölders" – Eastern Front — September 1942 – March 1943
1	2 September 1942	08:45	LaGG-3	southwest of Karmanovo	5	9 September 1942	17:07	Il-2	PQ 47731; 5 km (3.1 mi) southeast of Rzhev
2	3 September 1942	06:20	LaGG-3	southwest of Karmanovo	6	10 September 1942	07:13	Il-2	PQ 47734; 5 km (3.1 mi) southeast of Rzhev
3	3 September 1942	10:30	LaGG-3	southeast of Zubtsov	7	28 January 1943	13:48	Pe-2	PQ 46251; 25 km (16 mi) northeast of Konaja
4	4 September 1942	17:35	Pe-2	south of Zubtsov	8	18 March 1943	08:12	LaGG-3	PQ 35 Ost 53 64
– 8. Staffel of Jagdgeschwader 51 "Mölders" – Eastern Front — September – 31 December 1943
9	5 September 1943	15:15	Pe-2	Seredyna-Buda	32	19 October 1943	13:51	Yak-7	Chernihiv
10	10 September 1943	15:07	Il-2 m.H. (Note: The "m.H." refers to an Ilyushin Il-2 with rear gunner (mit Heckschütze).)	13 km (8.1 mi) southeast of Starodub	33	20 October 1943	11:21	Yak-7	over Loyew
11	10 September 1943	15:09	Il-2 m.H.	27 km (17 mi) southeast of Starodub	34	21 October 1943	07:38	Yak-7	over Loyew
12? (Note: This claim is not listed by Mathews and Foreman.)	11 September 1943	14:32	LaGG-3	south of Kirov	35	21 October 1943	07:43	Yak-7	Loyew
13	11 September 1943	14:35	LaGG-3	22 km (14 mi) southeast of Kirov	36	21 October 1943	07:47	Yak-9	6 km (3.7 mi) south of Loyew
14	12 September 1943	11:32	MiG-3	15 km (9.3 mi) southwest of Kirov	37	22 October 1943	12:04	Yak-9	Loyew
15	12 September 1943	11:33	Il-2 m.H.	12 km (7.5 mi) southwest of Kirov	38	22 October 1943	12:23	Yak-7	5 km (3.1 mi) northeast of Loyew
16	15 September 1943	09:52	Il-2 m.H.	6 km (3.7 mi) southeast of Yelnya	39	25 October 1943	15:42	LaGG-3	Loyew
17	15 September 1943	09:56	Il-2 m.H.	9 km (5.6 mi) southeast of Yelnya	40	25 October 1943	15:46	LaGG-3	Gomel
18	15 September 1943	12:20	La-5	15 km (9.3 mi) north of Yelnya	41	28 October 1943	15:02	P-39	Rechytsa
19	15 September 1943	16:37	Yak-9	10 km (6.2 mi) northwest of Yelnya	42	28 October 1943	15:05	P-39	Gomel
20	17 September 1943	17:32	La-5	Yelnya	43	30 October 1943	13:22	Yak-7	Radul
21	27 September 1943	16:07	Il-2 m.H.	Surazh	44	5 November 1943	14:15	Yak-9	southeast of Nevel
22	7 October 1943	15:21	Yak-7	southeast of Nevel	45	6 November 1943	07:12	Yak-7	Orsha
23	10 October 1943	17:40	LaGG-3	southeast of Nevel	46	6 November 1943	12:31	P-51	Nevel
24	11 October 1943	09:07	Yak-9	northwest of Velizh	47	10 November 1943	11:32	Yak-7	15 km (9.3 mi) southeast of Nevel
25	13 October 1943	11:05	Yak-7	57 km (35 mi) east of Orsha	48	11 November 1943	11:32	Il-2 m.H.	east of Vitebsk
26	13 October 1943	11:06	Yak-7	55 km (34 mi) southeast of Orsha	49	11 November 1943	11:58	La-5	east of Vitebsk
27	14 October 1943	06:50	LaGG-3	62 km (39 mi) east of Orsha	50	11 November 1943	12:02	La-5	east of Vitebsk
28	14 October 1943	07:07	La-5	50 km (31 mi) east of Orsha	51	22 November 1943	08:30	Yak-7	20 km (12 mi) northeast of Gomel
29	14 October 1943	07:08	La-5	east of Orsha	52	22 November 1943	08:34	Yak-7	25 km (16 mi) southeast of Gomel
30	15 October 1943	07:34	Yak-7	Orsha	53	12 December 1943	10:58	La-5	PQ 25 Ost 96655
31	19 October 1943	13:39	Yak-9	Chernihiv					
– 8. Staffel of Jagdgeschwader 51 "Mölders" – Eastern Front — 1 January – 23 February 1944
54	13 January 1944	14:34	Yak-9	PQ 25 Ost 93483	67	9 February 1944	14:53	La-5	PQ 35 Ost 06544
55	16 January 1944	12:31	LaGG-3	PQ 25 Ost 93523	68	12 February 1944	10:13	La-5	PQ 25 Ost 96655
56	24 January 1944	10:17	Yak-7	PQ 25 Ost 93445	69	12 February 1944	13:40	Yak-7	PQ 25 Ost 96698
57	24 January 1944	10:22	Yak-7	PQ 25 Ost 93483	70	12 February 1944	13:44	Yak-7	PQ 25 Ost 96636
58	6 February 1944	07:40	Il-2	PQ 25 Ost 96667	71♠	21 February 1944	11:50	Il-2	PQ 35 Ost 04779
59	6 February 1944	07:45	Il-2	PQ 25 Ost 96656	72♠	21 February 1944	11:51	Il-2	PQ 35 Ost 04789
60	6 February 1944	12:27	Yak-9	PQ 25 Ost 96656	73♠	21 February 1944	15:16	La-5	PQ 35 Ost 04568
61	6 February 1944	14:51	LaGG-3	PQ 25 Ost 96656	74♠	21 February 1944	15:17	La-5	PQ 35 Ost 04567
62	7 February 1944	07:44	La-5	PQ 35 Ost 06785	75♠	21 February 1944	15:31	Yak-9	PQ 35 Ost 03176
63	7 February 1944	10:39	La-5	PQ 35 Ost 06881	76♠	21 February 1944	15:42	Yak-7	PQ 35 Ost 03118
64	7 February 1944	10:46	La-5	PQ 35 Ost 06788	77	22 February 1944	11:20	Pe-2	PQ 35 Ost 03119
65	7 February 1944	15:15	La-5	PQ 35 Ost 06768	78	22 February 1944	13:31	Yak-9	PQ 25 Ost 93267
66	9 February 1944	14:47	La-5	PQ 25 Ost 96668					

=== Awards ===
- Iron Cross 2nd and 1st Class
- Honor Goblet of the Luftwaffe (13 December 1943)
- German Cross in Gold on 26 December 1943 as Feldwebel in the 8./Jagdgeschwader 51
- Knight's Cross of the Iron Cross on 4 May 1944 as Oberfeldwebel and pilot in the 9./Jagdgeschwader 51 "Mölders" (Note: According to Scherzer as pilot in the 8./Jagdgeschwader 51 "Mölders".)
