= List of aerial victories claimed by Gerhard Barkhorn =

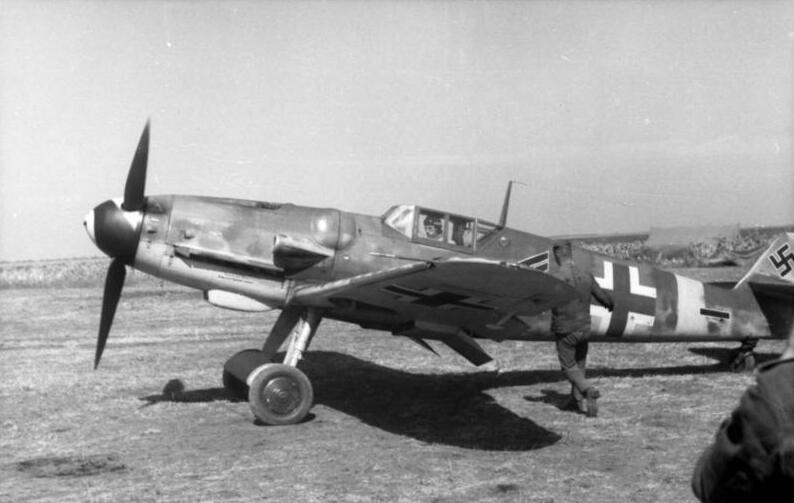
Barkhorn in a Bf 109, Anapa, 1943.

Gerhard "Gerd" Barkhorn (20 March 1919 – 11 January 1983) was a German military aviator and wing commander in the Luftwaffe during World War II. As a fighter ace, he was the second most successful fighter pilot of all time after fellow pilot Erich Hartmann. Other than Hartmann, Barkhorn is the only fighter ace to ever exceed 300 claimed victories.

== List of aerial victories claimed ==
According to US historian David T. Zabecki, Barkhorn claimed 301 victories in 1,100 combat missions. He was shot down nine times, bailed out once and was wounded twice. Author Spick states his total number of combat missions was 1,104 and a mission-to-claim ratio of 3.67. Mathews and Foreman, authors of Luftwaffe Aces – Biographies and Victory Claims, researched the German Federal Archives and found records for 300 aerial victory claims, plus one further unconfirmed claim. All of his aerial victories were claimed on the Eastern Front.

Victory claims were logged to a map-reference (PQ = Planquadrat), for example "PQ 44793". The Luftwaffe grid map (Jägermeldenetz) covered all of Europe, western Russia and North Africa and was composed of rectangles measuring 15 minutes of latitude by 30 minutes of longitude, an area of about 360 square miles (930 km^{2}). These sectors were then subdivided into 36 smaller units to give a location area 3 km × 4 km (1.9 mi × 2.5 mi) in size.

♠ (Ace of spades) indicates those aerial victories which made Barkhorn an "ace-in-a-day", a term which designates a fighter pilot who has shot down five or more airplanes in a single day.
– (dash) indicates unconfirmed aerial victory claims for which Barkhorn did not receive credit.
? (question mark) indicates information discrepancies listed by Barbas, Prien, Stemmer, Rodeike, Bock, Mathews and Foreman.

Barkhorn joined 6. Staffel (6th squadron) of Jagdgeschwader 52 (JG 52—52nd Fighter Wing) on 18 August 1940.

Claim	Date	Time	Type	Location	Claim	Date	Time	Type	Location
– 6. Staffel of Jagdgeschwader 52 –
1	2 July 1941	18:50	DB-3		6	25 August 1941	10:40	I-153	
2	28 July 1941	11:20	I-16		7	25 August 1941	12:59	I-18 (MiG-1)	
3	29 July 1941	17:34	DB-3		8	23 September 1941	16:30	I-18 (MiG-1)	
4	19 August 1941	13:35	I-18 (MiG-1)		9	4 October 1941	13:37	DB-3	
5	22 August 1941	12:25	V-11 (Il-2)		10	30 November 1941	10:07	I-61 (MiG-3)	

On 1 March 1942, Barkhorn was transferred and appointed Staffelkapitän (squadron leader) of 4. Staffel of JG 52.

Claim	Date	Time	Type	Location	Claim	Date	Time	Type	Location
– 4. Staffel of Jagdgeschwader 52 –
11	16 May 1942	06:18	MiG-1		87	8 December 1942	10:15	P-40	10 km (6.2 mi) south of Prudboy
12	18 May 1942	05:50	R-5		88	10 December 1942	14:30	P-40	3 km (1.9 mi) east of Barizynskij
13	25 May 1942	09:24	Il-2		89	11 December 1942	09:25	Yak-1	2 km (1.2 mi) west of Kulpinskij
14	26 May 1942	05:28	LaGG-3	3 km (1.9 mi) east of Protopopowka	90	11 December 1942	09:27	Yak-1	2.5 km (1.6 mi) northwest of Kulpinskij
15	26 May 1942	11:30	Il-2		91	11 December 1942	09:30	Yak-1	4 km (2.5 mi) northwest of Kulpinskij
16	27 May 1942	08:30	MiG-1		92	13 December 1942	10:45	P-40	5 km (3.1 mi) northwest of Ssamochin
17	27 May 1942	15:28	Pe-2	6 km (3.7 mi) northeast of Petrovskaja	93	13 December 1942	10:50	P-40	5 km (3.1 mi) south of Kamenko
18	5 June 1942	04:45	MiG-1		94	13 December 1942	11:30	Il-2	5 km (3.1 mi) north of Tschilekow
19	9 June 1942	14:52	LaGG-3		95	17 December 1942	07:50	Yak-1	1 km (0.62 mi) south of Abganerovo
20	11 June 1942	09:45	LaGG-3		96	17 December 1942	10:10	Yak-1	5 km (3.1 mi) west of Abganerovo
21	14 June 1942	13:55	LaGG-3		97	17 December 1942	13:11	Yak-1	5 km (3.1 mi) north of Shutow 2
22♠	22 June 1942	05:52	LaGG-3	Kupiansk	98	18 December 1942	09:45	Yak-1	15 km (9.3 mi) east of Werch, Komskij
23♠	22 June 1942	05:55	LaGG-3	Kupiansk	99	18 December 1942	10:35	Yak-1	8 km (5.0 mi) west of Shutowo
24♠	22 June 1942	05:57	LaGG-3	Kupiansk	100	19 December 1942	09:15	P-40	3 km (1.9 mi) south of Sety
25♠	22 June 1942	06:25	LaGG-3	Kupiansk	101	19 December 1942	09:20	P-40	1 km (0.62 mi) south of Turguta
26♠	22 June 1942	11:45	LaGG-3		102	20 December 1942	08:00	LaGG-3	5 km (3.1 mi) east of Gratschij
27	23 June 1942	12:55	Yak-1		103	9 January 1943	12:45	Yak-1	PQ 28783, 9 km (5.6 mi) north of the Kuberke train station vicinity of Zimovniki
28	24 June 1942	07:48	LaGG-3		104	9 January 1943	12:50	Yak-1	PQ 28783, 2 km (1.2 mi) northwest of Zimovniki
29	24 June 1942	07:52	LaGG-3		105	10 January 1943	06:17	Yak-1	PQ 28852, Remontnaja
30	25 June 1942	18:05	LaGG-3		106	4 February 1943	09:10	Yak-4	PQ 44 Ost 08892, 5 km (3.1 mi) northeast of Korsertschy-Chomuty
31	26 June 1942	13:05	LaGG-3		107	7 February 1943	12:10	Il-2	PQ 44 Ost 99472, 5 km (3.1 mi) northeast of Budjonowka
32	30 June 1942	18:05	LaGG-3		108	11 February 1943	07:15	I-16	PQ 44 Ost 8532, 5 km (3.1 mi) southwest of Eriwanskaja
33	30 June 1942	18:09	LaGG-3		109	11 February 1943	13:25	LaGG-3	PQ 44 Ost 8537, 5 km (3.1 mi) southeast of Gelendzhik
34	1 July 1942	06:05	LaGG-3		110	11 February 1943	13:30	LaGG-3	PQ 44 Ost 8537, 5 km (3.1 mi) northwest of Gelendzhik
35	1 July 1942	10:07	Il-2		111	11 February 1943	13:40	I-153	PQ 44 Ost 7564, 5 km (3.1 mi) southeast of Novorossiysk
36	1 July 1942	10:11	Boston		112	12 February 1943	06:03	I-16	PQ 34 Ost 75464, 5 km (3.1 mi) southeast of Kabardinka
37	1 July 1942	19:04	Hurricane		113	12 February 1943	06:10	I-16	PQ 34 Ost 75462, east of Kabardinka
38	2 July 1942	07:20	LaGG-3		114	12 February 1943	11:55	Yak-1	PQ 34 Ost 86552, 4 km (2.5 mi) southeast of Peltawskaja
39	2 July 1942	09:20	LaGG-3		115	12 February 1943	12:03	Yak-1	PQ 34 Ost 8659, 5 km (3.1 mi) northwest of Iwanowskaja
40	4 July 1942	06:27	LaGG-3		116	13 February 1943	13:34	Yak-1	PQ 34 Ost 8522, 4 km (2.5 mi) northwest of Georgije; Afipskaja
41	4 July 1942	10:30	LaGG-3		117	22 February 1943	08:15	LaGG-3	PQ 34 Ost 75422, 1 km (0.62 mi) north of Hight 446
42	5 July 1942	17:43	Hurricane		118	22 February 1943	08:20	LaGG-3	PQ 34 Ost 75422, 3 km (1.9 mi) east of Schirokoja-Balka (Balker)
43	6 July 1942	15:30	LaGG-3		119	26 February 1943	10:45	LaGG-3	PQ 34 Ost 75463, 7 km (4.3 mi) southwest of Kabardinka
44	9 July 1942	15:55	LaGG-3		120	27 February 1943	14:00	Yak-1	PQ 34 Ost 86533, 6 km (3.7 mi) northwest of Staromyschastowskaja
45	10 July 1942	16:40	LaGG-3		121	28 April 1943	09:45	LaGG-3	PQ 34 Ost 86794, 10 km (6.2 mi) east of Mingrelskaja
46♠	19 July 1942	07:00	LaGG-3		122	29 April 1943	13:20	LaGG-3	PQ 34 Ost 86792, 8 km (5.0 mi) northeast of Mingrelskaja
47♠	19 July 1942	07:35	Hurricane	vicinity of Rostov	123	29 April 1943	13:50	LaGG-3	PQ 34 Ost 85211, 2 km (1.2 mi) northwest of Nowo-Iwanowskoje
48♠	19 July 1942	07:36	Hurricane	vicinity of Rostov	124	29 April 1943	17:30	LaGG-3	PQ 34 Ost 85161, 5 km (3.1 mi) north of Kholmskaya
49♠	19 July 1942	11:25	LaGG-3		125	30 April 1943	07:45	Spitfire	PQ 34 Ost 85161, 5 km (3.1 mi) north of Kholmskaya
50♠	19 July 1942	15:20	LaGG-3		126	30 April 1943	17:15	LaGG-3	PQ 34 Ost 85173, 3 km (1.9 mi) southwest of Usun
51♠	19 July 1942	15:30	I-16		127	9 May 1943	16:55	LaGG-3	PQ 34 Ost 76864, Kruglik
52♠	20 July 1942	07:07	LaGG-3		128	28 May 1943	09:18	Spitfire	PQ 34 Ost 76893, 4 km (2.5 mi) southeast of Kijewskoje
53♠	20 July 1942	13:16	LaGG-3		129	28 May 1943	09:48	Yak-1	PQ 34 Ost 76894, 10 km (6.2 mi) east of Kijewskoje
54♠	20 July 1942	13:18	LaGG-3		130	29 May 1943	18:20	Il-2	PQ 34 Ost 75231, 4 km (2.5 mi) northwest of Krymskaja
55♠	20 July 1942	13:20	LaGG-3		131	29 May 1943	18:25	Yak-1	PQ 34 Ost 76894, 8 km (5.0 mi) east of Kijewskoje
56♠	20 July 1942	16:00	LaGG-3		132	31 May 1943	10:40	P-39	PQ 34 Ost 86573, 4 km (2.5 mi) south of Slavyanskaya
57	21 July 1942	09:55	I-16		133	31 May 1943	13:15	Yak-1	PQ 34 Ost 75231, northwest of Krymskaja
58	22 July 1942	17:46	Hurricane		134	8 June 1943	09:28	LaGG-3	PQ 34 Ost 76831, 2 km (1.2 mi) north of Anastasiewskaja
59	23 July 1942	04:15	LaGG-3		135	10 June 1943	11:59	La-5	PQ 34 Ost 85132, Abinskaja
60	23 July 1942	04:25	LaGG-3		136	10 June 1943	18:28	La-5	PQ 34 Ost 76861, 10 km (6.2 mi) north of Kijewskoje
61	23 July 1942	13:50	I-153		137	10 June 1943	18:34	La-5	PQ 34 Ost 86731, 8 km (5.0 mi) east of Krymskaja
62	24 July 1942	10:20	I-16		138	30 July 1943	06:40	Yak-1	PQ 34 Ost 76893, 2 km (1.2 mi) southeast of Kijewskoje
63	24 July 1942	15:13	LaGG-3		139	2 August 1943	08:00	Yak-1	PQ 34 Ost 99778, 2 km (1.2 mi) east of Wagoltschik
64	24 July 1942	15:14	LaGG-3		140	2 August 1943	12:15	Yak-1	PQ 34 Ost 88292, Kuybyshev
65	7 October 1942	08:05	LaGG-3	3 km (1.9 mi) northeast Tuapse	141	4 August 1943	15:35	La-5	PQ 35 Ost 61355, Tomarovka
66	7 October 1942	13:25	LaGG-3	PQ 95674, Gunaiberg	142	4 August 1943	16:03	La-5	PQ 35 Ost 61365, Belgorod
67	7 October 1942	13:29	LaGG-3	PQ 95674, Gunaiberg	143	5 August 1943	09:58	La-5	PQ 35 Ost 61365, Belgorod
68	7 October 1942	13:29	LaGG-3	PQ 95674, Gunaiberg	144	5 August 1943	15:55	Yak-1	PQ 35 Ost 61339, northwest of Belgorod
69	9 October 1942	12:50	I-16	3 km (1.9 mi) south of Nelkokow	145	5 August 1943	16:02	Yak-1	PQ 35 Ost 61418, Belgorod
70	20 October 1942	14:15	R-5	15 km (9.3 mi) southeast of Tuapse	146	7 August 1943	07:05	Yak-1	PQ 35 Ost 61254, Melinowka
71	25 October 1942	13:30	LaGG-3	15 km (9.3 mi) southeast of Slepsowskaja	147	7 August 1943	15:20	La-5	PQ 35 Ost 51474, Dorogoschtsch
72	25 October 1942	13:35	LaGG-3	16 km (9.9 mi) southeast of Slepsowskaja	148	7 August 1943	15:27	La-5	PQ 35 Ost 51424, Protopopowka
73	26 October 1942	15:30	LaGG-3	16 km (9.9 mi) east of Aponka	149	7 August 1943	18:32	La-5	PQ 35 Ost 60832, Sergejewka
74	26 October 1942	15:32	LaGG-3	PQ 44811, Bataku-Jurt	150	8 August 1943	06:10	Il-2 m.H. (Note: The "m.H." refers to an Ilyushin Il-2 with rear gunner (mit Heckschütze).)	PQ 35 Ost 61523, Bessonowka
75	29 October 1942	12:42	Yak-1	2 km (1.2 mi) north of Altebinal	151	8 August 1943	06:13	Il-2 m.H.	PQ 35 Ost 61523, Bessonowka
76	30 October 1942	08:50	Yak-1	6 km (3.7 mi) south of Lazarevskoye	152	12 August 1943	15:45	La-5	PQ 35 Ost 51843, 30 km (19 mi) east of Bogodacha
77	30 October 1942	11:50	LaGG-3	10 km (6.2 mi) east of Schatschi	153	21 August 1943	08:07	La-5	PQ 34 Ost 88295, Kurykitschewo
78	30 October 1942	12:05	LaGG-3	3 km (1.9 mi) southwest of Alexejewka	154	21 August 1943	11:07	Il-2 m.H.	PQ 34 Ost 88256, 3 km (1.9 mi) east of Kalinowka
79	3 November 1942	14:45	LaGG-3	10 km (6.2 mi) north of Tuapse	155	22 August 1943	14:20	La-5	PQ 35 Ost 70763, south of Krasnij-Oskol
80	10 November 1942	11:15	LaGG-3	3 km (1.9 mi) southeast of Lazarevskoye	156	23 August 1943	10:00	La-5	PQ 34 Ost 79131, Dolegaskaja
81	15 November 1942	09:00	LaGG-3	3 km (1.9 mi) southeast of Lazarevskoye	157	23 August 1943	10:27	La-5	PQ 35 Ost 70843, 15 km (9.3 mi) east of Krassnij-Oskol
82	28 November 1942	11:00	P-40	10 km (6.2 mi) northeast of Bussinowka	158	23 August 1943	14:28	La-5	PQ 35 Ost 70792, 3 km (1.9 mi) east of Krassnij-Oskol
83	30 November 1942	08:30	P-40	10 km (6.2 mi) west of Tundutow	159	23 August 1943	14:50	La-5	PQ 35 Ost 70792, 5 km (3.1 mi) east of Kamyschewicha
84	30 November 1942	08:40	Yak-1	5 km (3.1 mi) south of Kauschino	160	24 August 1943	06:15	Yak-1	PQ 35 Ost 70812, 15 km (9.3 mi) east of Izium
85	30 November 1942	08:45	LaGG-3	10 km (6.2 mi) north of Wertjatschi	161	24 August 1943	14:34	Yak-1	PQ 35 Ost 70784, 15 km (9.3 mi) south of Izium
86	2 December 1942	13:50	Yak-1	5 km (3.1 mi) south of Tundutow	162? (Note: According to Prien, Stemmer, Rodeike and Bock, this claim was with 4./JG 52 as Barkhorn was Staffelkapitän of 4. Staffel until 31 August 1943. Mathews and Foreman state that this claim was with Stab II./JG 52.)	26 August 1943	17:05	Il-2 m.H.	PQ 34 Ost 76681, 15 km (9.3 mi) northwesth of Anastasijewskaja

On 1 September 1943, Barkhorn was appointed Gruppenkommandeur (group commander) of II. Gruppe (2nd group) of JG 52.

Claim	Date	Time	Type	Location	Claim	Date	Time	Type	Location
– Stab II. Gruppe of Jagdgeschwader 52 –
163	2 September 1943	17:55	Yak-9	PQ 35 Ost 60151, 1 km (0.62 mi) north of Besljudowka	233	3 January 1944	10:45	Yak-1	PQ 66623 vicinity of Iljitsch
164	4 September 1943	16:55	Il-2 m.H.	PQ 35 Ost 40232, 1 km (0.62 mi) north of Kotelwa; Kolontajew	234	12 January 1944	10:07	Il-2 m.H.	east of Bulganak
165	5 September 1943	10:55	La-5	PQ 35 Ost 40273	235	18 January 1944	11:27	P-39	vicinity of Kerch
166	5 September 1943	11:05	La-5	PQ 35 Ost 40222	236	23 January 1944	09:27	Yak-1	PQ 66642 vicinity of Majak
167	6 September 1943	14:15	Yak-1	PQ 35 Ost 60342, 2 km (1.2 mi) northwest of Taranowka	237	23 January 1944	09:29	Yak-1	vicinity of Kerch
168	6 September 1943	14:25	Yak-1	PQ 35 Ost 6035, 3 km (1.9 mi) east of Taranowka	238	23 January 1944	12:15	P-39	PQ 66671 east of Kerch
169	6 September 1943	17:24	Yak-1	PQ 35 Ost 60312, 3 km (1.9 mi) west of Ssokolowo	239	24 January 1944	14:56	Yak-1	Cape Tarchan
170	8 September 1943	07:45	Il-2 m.H.	PQ 35 Ost 60394, 10 km (6.2 mi) west of Andrejewka	240	25 January 1944	12:50	P-39	PQ 66592 vicinity of Kamysh Burun
171	8 September 1943	07:55	La-5	PQ 35 Ost 60352, 7 km (4.3 mi) east of Taranowka	241	26 January 1944	12:00	P-39	PQ 6667
172	8 September 1943	17:23	La-5	PQ 35 Ost PQ 60314, 5 km (3.1 mi) southeast of Taranowka	242	28 January 1944	12:19? (Note: According to Mathews and Foreman claimed at 12:18.)	P-39	PQ 66614 vicinity of Majak-Bakny
173	9 September 1943	14:35	Yak-1	PQ 35 Ost 51794	243	10 February 1944	13:45	Yak-9	east of Bulganak
174	9 September 1943	17:13	La-5	PQ 35 Ost 51853	244	10 February 1944	15:00	Yak-9	east of Bulganak
175	13 September 1943	13:25	Yak-1	PQ 35 Ost 60342, northwest of Taranowka	245	10 February 1944	15:35	Yak-9	PQ 66533 vicinity of Bagerovo
176	13 September 1943	13:50	Yak-1	PQ 35 Ost 60234	246	12 February 1944	10:46	Yak-9	PQ 66643 vicinity of Kerch
177	20 September 1943	09:20	R-5	PQ 35 Ost 11212	247	12 February 1944	12:58	Yak-1	east-northeast of Bulganak
178	15 November 1943	10:07	Yak-1	PQ 34 Ost 66812, northwest of Taman	248	12 February 1944	13:20	Yak-1	PQ 66473; 25 km (16 mi) southeast of Rusa
179	15 November 1943	10:20	Yak-1	PQ 34 Ost 66594	249	12 February 1944	15:50	Yak-9	PQ 66614 vicinity of Majak-Bakny
180	16 November 1943	11:57	P-39	PQ 34 Ost 66832	250	13 February 1944? (Note: According to Mathews and Foreman claimed on 12 February 1944.)	12:46	Yak-1	Adzymuskaj
181	16 November 1943	12:25	P-39	PQ 34 Ost 66591	251	25 February 1944	12:00	Pe-2	PQ 4641
182	16 November 1943	14:17	Yak-1	PQ 34 Ost 6664, 2 km (1.2 mi) east of Bakssy	252	24 April 1944	11:25	Boston	PQ 35443 vicinity of Sevastopol
183	19 November 1943	09:07	Yak-1	PQ 34 Ost 66644	253	24 April 1944	13:55	Yak-7	vicinity of Balaklava over the Black Sea, 10 km (6.2 mi) south of Sevastopol
184	19 November 1943	14:15	P-39	PQ 34 Ost 66734, south of Kerch over the sea east of Elitigen	254	26 April 1944	12:08	Yak-7	north of Balaklava; 10 km (6.2 mi) south of Sevastopol
185	19 November 1943	14:20	Yak-1	PQ 34 Ost 66811, west of Taman	255	26 April 1944	17:10	Yak-7	vicinity of Belbek
186	20 November 1943	10:15	Yak-1	PQ 34 Ost 66677	256	26 April 1944	17:50	Yak-7	vicinity of Balaklava over the Black Sea, 10 km (6.2 mi) south of Sevastopol
187	20 November 1943	13:40	Yak-1	PQ 34 Ost 66643, Kolonka	257	27 April 1944	10:48	Yak-7	vicinity of Belbek vicinity of Sevastopol
188	20 November 1943	13:45	P-39	Kerch harbor	258	28 April 1944	12:35	Yak-7	PQ 35452; 15 km (9.3 mi) east of Sevastopol
189	21 November 1943	09:22	Yak-9	PQ 34 Ost 66641, northwest of Bakssy	259	28 April 1944	15:23	Yak-7	PQ 35481; 15 km (9.3 mi) southeast of Sevastopol
190	21 November 1943	13:35	Yak-1	PQ 34 Ost 66613, northeast of Bulganak	260	28 April 1944	15:25	Yak-7	vicinity of Sevastopol; 15 km (9.3 mi) east of Sevastopol
191	26 November 1943	10:38	Yak-1	southeast of Kerch	261	1 May 1944	11:05	Yak-7	vicinity of Balaklava; 10 km (6.2 mi) south of Sevastopol
192	26 November 1943	14:03	Yak-1	southwest of Kertsch	262	4 May 1944	12:24	Yak-7	PQ 35624; 25 km (16 mi) southeast of Sevastopol
193	26 November 1943	14:05	Yak-1	southeast of Kertsch	263	5 May 1944	10:52	Il-2 m.H.	vicinity of Belbek over the Black Sea, 15 km (9.3 mi) northwest of Sevastopol
194	27 November 1943	09:45	P-39	east of Sentinel 3	264	5 May 1944	11:00	Yak-7	PQ 35273; 10 km (6.2 mi) north-northeast of Sevastopol
195	28 November 1943	08:44	Yak-1	PQ 34 Ost 66732, east of Eltigen	265	6 May 1944	15:10	Yak-7	vicinity of Katscha
196	28 November 1943	08:47	Yak-1	PQ 34 Ost 66534	266	8 May 1944	09:11	Yak-7	vicinity of Balaklava over the Black Sea, 10 km (6.2 mi) south of Sevastopol
197	28 November 1943	09:00	Yak-1	PQ 34 Ost 66594	267	8 May 1944	09:17	Il-2 m.H.	vicinity of Balaklava; 10 km (6.2 mi) south of Sevastopol
198	29 November 1943	10:15	P-39	west of Cape Takyl	268	30 May 1944	16:55	P-39	PQ 78643; 10 km (6.2 mi) south of Tudora
199	29 November 1943	14:20	Yak-1	PQ Ost 66734, southeast of Eltigen	269	30 May 1944	17:05	P-39	PQ 78643; 10 km (6.2 mi) south of Tudora
200	30 November 1943	09:50	Yak-1	western Kolonka	270	31 May 1944	05:38	P-39	vicinity of Huși; 8 km (5.0 mi) north of Iași
201	1 December 1943	14:12	Il-2 m.H.	southeast of Eltigen	—	31 May 1944	05:45	P-39	vicinity of Huși
202♠	2 December 1943	10:27	Yak-1	Kossa Tusla	271	31 May 1944	06:10	Il-2 m.H.	PQ 78823; 10 km (6.2 mi) south of Iași
203♠	2 December 1943	10:39	P-39	south of Eltigen	272	31 May 1944	06:15	Yak-9	PQ 78643; 10 km (6.2 mi) south of Tudora
204♠	2 December 1943	10:48	Il-2	east of Eltigen	273	26 October 1944	14:25	Yak-3	PQ 18287; 15 km (9.3 mi) south of Nyregynaza
205♠	2 December 1943	14:15	Yak-1	Kamysh Burun	274	14 November 1944	11:45	Yak-9	PQ 08471; 35 km (22 mi) west-northwest of Karcag
206♠	2 December 1943	14:18	Yak-1	east of Kamysh Burun	275	14 November 1944	12:00	Yak-9	PQ 98635 vicinity of Jászberény
207♠	2 December 1943	14:23	Yak-1	northwest of Cape Takyl	276♠	16 November 1944	—	Il-2	
208	4 December 1943	09:06	Il-2 m.H.	east of Eltigen	277♠	16 November 1944	—	Il-2	
209	4 December 1943	14:09	Il-2 m.H.	east of Eltigen	278♠	16 November 1944	—	Il-2	
210	6 December 1943	14:21	Yak-1	west of Kossal Tusla	279♠	16 November 1944	13:40	Yak-9? (Note: According to Mathews and Foreman claimed as a Yakovlev Yak-3.)	PQ 98478 vicinity of Jászberény
211	6 December 1943	14:37	Il-2	southeast of Eltigen	280♠	16 November 1944	13:45	Yak-9? (Note: According to Mathews and Foreman claimed as a Lavochkin La-5.)	PQ 98452; 20 km (12 mi) southwest of Gyöngyös
212	9 December 1943	10:18	Il-2 m.H.	south of Dshankoj	281	17 November 1944	10:23	La-5	PQ 98615; 40 km (25 mi) east-northeast of Budapest
213	9 December 1943	10:25	Yak-1	east of Kolonka	282	17 November 1944	15:00	La-5?	PQ 98622; 30 km (19 mi) southwest of Gyöngyös
214	17 December 1943	10:13	P-39	northeast of Bakssy	283	23 November 1944	—	Il-2	
215	27 December 1943	12:11	P-39	PQ 34 Ost 6664, northwest of Bakssy	284	24 November 1944	—	Pe-2	
216♠	28 December 1943	08:47	Yak-1	north of Cape Warsowka	285	25 December 1944	—	Yak-9	
217♠	28 December 1943	08:53	Il-2 m.H.	near Dshankoj	286	25 December 1944	—	Yak-9	
218♠	28 December 1943	10:20	Yak-1	east of Cape Khroni	287	29 December 1944	—	Il-2	
219♠	28 December 1943	10:23	Yak-1	west of Cape Khroni	288	29 December 1944	—	Boston	
220♠	28 December 1943	12:07	Yak-1	Kertsch harbor	289	2 January 1945	—	Il-2	
221♠	28 December 1943	12:10	P-39	north of Bakssy	290	2 January 1945	—	Il-2	
222♠	28 December 1943	12:21	Yak-1	Kertsch harbor	291	2 January 1945	—	Yak-9	
223	29 December 1943	09:38	Yak-9	north of Katerles	292	3 January 1945	—	Il-2	
224	29 December 1943	13:35	P-39	east of Opassnaja	293	3 January 1945	—	Il-2	
225	29 December 1943	13:45	Yak-1	south of Bulganak	294	3 January 1945	—	Yak-9	
226	29 December 1943	13:48	Yak-1	north of Dshankoj	295	3 January 1945	—	Yak-9	
227	30 December 1943	09:30	Yak-1	northern Bulganak	296	4 January 1945	—	La-5	
228	30 December 1943	13:23	Yak-1	east of Bulganak	297	4 January 1945	—	La-5	
229	1 January 1944	10:43	Yak-1	PQ 66654 over the sea east of Kerch	298	4 January 1945	—	La-5	
230	1 January 1944	13:08	Pe-2	Cape Tarchan	299	4 January 1945	—	Yak-9	
231	1 January 1944	13:09	Pe-2	Cape Tarchan	300	5 January 1945	—	La-5	
232	1 January 1944	13:10	Pe-2	Cape Khroni					
