= List of aerial victories claimed by Oskar-Heinrich Bär =

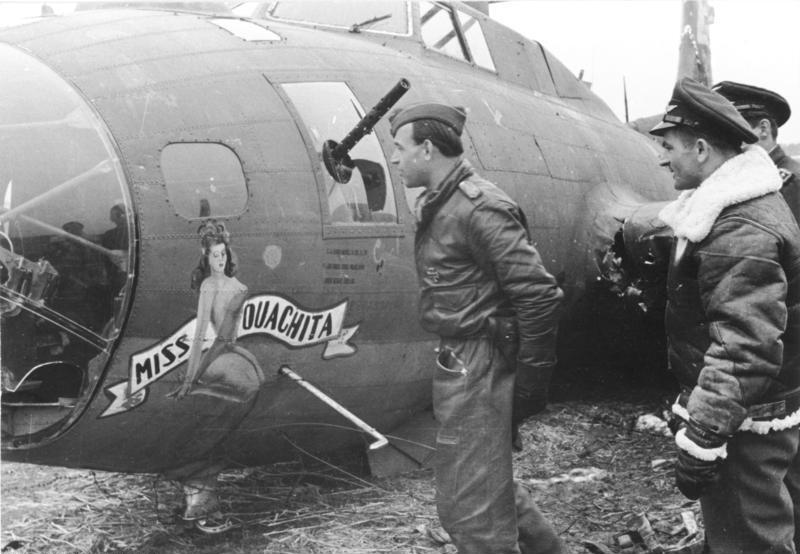
Bär inspecting his 184th aerial victory, a Boeing B-17F of 91st Bomb Group on 21 February 1944. His wingman Leo Schuhmacher is standing to his right.

Oskar-Heinrich Bär (25 May 1913 – 28 April 1957) was a German Luftwaffe flying ace who served throughout World War II in Europe. Bär flew more than one thousand combat missions, and fought in the Western, Eastern and Mediterranean theatres. On 18 occasions he survived being shot down, and according to records in the German Federal Archives, he claimed to have shot down 228 enemy aircraft and was credited with 208 aerial victories, 16 of which were in a Messerschmitt Me 262 jet fighter. Sources credit him with 220 – 96 on Eastern Theatre and 124 on Western Theatre – up to 222 aerial victories may also be possible.

== List of aerial victories claimed ==
According to US historian David T. Zabecki, Bär was credited with 221 aerial victories. Obermaier also lists him with 221 aerial victories. The highest figure is given by Aders and Held who list Bär with 222 aerial victory claims. According to Spick, as well as by Morgan and Weal, Bär was credited with 220 aerial victories. Mathews and Foreman, authors of Luftwaffe Aces – Biographies and Victory Claims, researched the German Federal Archives and found records for 208 aerial victory claims, plus 20 further unconfirmed claims. This figure includes 95 aerial victories on the Eastern Front and 113 on the Western Front, including 14 four-engined bombers and 15 victories with the Me 262 jet fighter.

Victory claims were logged to a map-reference (PQ = Planquadrat), for example "PQ 05 Ost S/FN". The Luftwaffe grid map (Jägermeldenetz) covered all of Europe, western Russia and North Africa and was composed of rectangles measuring 15 minutes of latitude by 30 minutes of longitude, an area of about 360 square miles (930 km^{2}). These sectors were then subdivided into 36 smaller units to give a location area 3 km × 4 km (1.9 mi × 2.5 mi) in size.

♠ (Ace of spades) indicates those aerial victories which made Bär an "ace-in-a-day", a term which designates a fighter pilot who has shot down five or more airplanes in a single day.
– (dash) indicates unconfirmed aerial victory claims for which Bär did not receive credit.
* (asterisk) indicates an Herausschuss (separation shot)—a severely damaged heavy bomber forced to separate from his combat box which was counted as an aerial victory.
! (exclamation mark) indicates those aerial victories listed by Prien, Stemmer, Rodeike and Bock.
# (hash mark) indicates those aerial victories listed by Mathews and Foreman.
? (question mark) indicates information discrepancies listed by Prien, Stemmer, Rodeike, Bock, Heaton, Lewis, Mathews and Foreman.

Claim!	Claim#	Date	Time	Type	Location	Claim!	Claim#	Date	Time	Type	Location
– 1. Staffel of Jagdgeschwader 51 –
1	1	25 September 1939	12:30	Curtiss P-36	Weissenburg-Lauterburg	20	17	22 June 1941	09:45	SB-2? (Note: According to Mathews and Foreman claimed as a Mikoyan-Gurevich MiG-1.)	vicinity of Starnice
2	2	21 May 1940	16:20	Hurricane	Samer	21	18	25 June 1941	11:30	SB-2	vicinity of Terespol
3	3	23 May 1940	11:10	Hurricane	Béthune	22	19	25 June 1941	11:33	SB-2	vicinity of Terespol
4	—	18 August 1940	19:45	Hurricane	Thames Estuary	23♠	20	30 June 1941	10:55	DB-3	vicinity of Histowka
5	4	20 August 1940	16:10	Spitfire	Thames Estuary	24♠	21	30 June 1941	11:12	DB-3	vicinity of Histowka
6	5	24 August 1940	14:13	Hurricane	Margate	25♠	22	30 June 1941	19:20	DB-3	vicinity of Histowka
7	6	29 August 1940	20:10	Spitfire	Hawkinge	26♠	23	30 June 1941	19:35	DB-3	vicinity of Histowka
8	7	2 September 1940	09:15	Spitfire	Canterbury	27♠	24	30 June 1941	19:40	DB-3	vicinity of Histowka
9	8	8 September 1940	13:20	Spitfire		28	25	1 July 1941	13:45	I-16	vicinity of Nowo Histowka
10	9	9 September 1940	18:33	Hurricane		29	26	2 July 1941	11:29	I-16	vicinity of Histowka
11	—	15 September 1940	—	Spitfire		30	27	3 July 1941	13:45	V-11 (Il-2)	vicinity of Babruysk
12	10	8 November 1940	12:18	Hurricane	Strait of Dover	31	28	5 July 1941	11:27	I-18 (MiG-1)	vicinity of Babruysk
13	—	8 November 1940	15:05	Hurricane	north of Dungeness	32	29	5 July 1941	13:44	DB-3	vicinity of Babruysk
14	11	16 April 1941	18:25	Hurricane	20 km (12 mi) west of Le Touquet	33	30	5 July 1941	13:45	DB-3	vicinity of Babruysk
15	12	21 April 1941	20:07	Hurricane	northwest of Ashford	34	31	6 July 1941	20:15	V-11? (Note: According to Mathews and Foreman claimed as a Seversky.)	vicinity of Babruysk
16	13	6 May 1941	14:10	Spitfire	20 km (12 mi) northwest of Calais	35	32	6 July 1941	20:20	V-11!	vicinity of Babruysk
17	14	11 May 1941	21:40	Spitfire	8 km (5.0 mi) east of Deal	36	33	8 July 1941	19:35	SB-2	vicinity of Babruysk
18		22 June 1941	07:25	I-18 (MiG-1)		37	34	11 July 1941	15:02	DB-3	vicinity of Babruysk
19	15	22 June 1941	09:40	SB-2	vicinity of Starnice	38	35	11 July 1941	15:05	DB-3	vicinity of Babruysk
	16	22 June 1941	09:42	SB-2	vicinity of Starnice	39	36	11 July 1941	16:45	DB-3	
– 12. Staffel of Jagdgeschwader 51 –
40	37	22 July 1941	10:50	I-153	vicinity of Dankowow	66	62	19 August 1941	19:15	Pe-2	
41	38	22 July 1941	15:03	I-153	vicinity of Dankowow	67	63	19 August 1941	19:20	Pe-2	
42	39	23 July 1941	12:57	Pe-2	vicinity of Dankowow	68	64	20 August 1941	08:55	I-15	
43	40	23 July 1941	13:02	Pe-2	vicinity of Dankowow	69	65	20 August 1941	09:10	I-16	
44	41	23 July 1941	13:10	R-3? (Note: According to Mathews and Foreman claimed as an Ilyushin Il-2.)		70	66	22 August 1941	10:25	I-15	
45	42	24 July 1941	06:15	I-18 (MiG-1)		71	67	28 August 1941	18:12	Pe-2	southeast of Novgorod
46	43	26 July 1941	04:25	R-3?		72	68	28 August 1941	18:15	Pe-2	southeast of Novgorod
47	44	28 July 1941	07:45	DB-3		73♠	69	30 August 1941	12:00	I-61 (MiG-3)	
48	45	29 July 1941	04:12	SB-3		74♠	70	30 August 1941	12:02	DB-3	
49	46	29 July 1941	18:10	Pe-2		75♠	71	30 August 1941	12:03	DB-3	
50	—	29 July 1941	—	DB-3		76♠	72	30 August 1941	12:08	I-61 (MiG-3)	
51	47	2 August 1941	17:40	Pe-2		77♠	73	30 August 1941	18:05	SB-3	
52	48	3 August 1941	13:55	R-3?		78♠	74	30 August 1941	18:06	SB-3	
53	49	9 August 1941	13:30	DB-3		79	75	31 August 1941	11:20	Pe-2	
54	50	9 August 1941	13:34	DB-3		80	76	31 August 1941	11:25	Pe-2	
55	51	9 August 1941	19:00	SB-2		81	77	28 November 1941	13:40	SB-3	
56	52	10 August 1941	10:40	I-61 (MiG-1)		82	78	2 December 1941	08:45	I-61 (MiG-1)	
57	53	10 August 1941	10:55	I-15		83	79	2 December 1941	09:00	I-61 (MiG-1)	
58	54	11 August 1941	14:25	I-16		84	80	2 December 1941	10:15	Pe-2	
59	55	12 August 1941	07:55	SB-3		85	81	2 December 1941	12:07? (Note: According to Mathews and Foreman claimed at 14:07.)	I-61 (MiG-1)	
60	56	12 August 1941	08:30	SB-2? (Note: According to Mathews and Foreman claimed as a Petlyakov Pe-2.)		86	82	5 December 1941	12:05	I-61 (MiG-1)	
61	57	13 August 1941	11:30	I-18 (MiG-1)		87	83	7 December 1941	11:30	Pe-2	
62	58	14 August 1941	18:55	I-18 (MiG-1)		88	84	7 December 1941	13:57	Pe-2	
63	59	15 August 1941	16:30	I-61 (MiG-1)		89	—	11 February 1942	—	Pe-2	
64	60	18 August 1941	16:55	I-15		90	—	11 February 1942	—	Pe-2	
65	61	19 August 1941	17:15	I-16		91	—	22 February 1942	—	I-61 (MiG-3)	10 km (6.2 mi) south of Mologino
– Stab I. Gruppe of Jagdgeschwader 77 –
92	85	16 May 1942	10:35	LaGG-3		135	131	10 December 1942	15:10	P-40	northwest of El Agheila
93	86	16 May 1942	10:40	LaGG-3		136	132	10 December 1942	15:15	P-40	northwest of El Agheila
94	87	17 May 1942	13:05	I-16		137	133	11 December 1942	15:32	P-40	east of Ras Umm er Garanigh
95	88	17 May 1942	13:35	I-16		138	134	14 December 1942	11:20	P-40	west of El Agheila
96	92	17 May 1942	13:40	I-16		139	135	14 December 1942	11:25	P-40	west of El Agheila
97	93	18 May 1942	12:10	LaGG-3		140♠	136	14 January 1943	08:39? (Note: According to Mathews and Foreman claimed at 10:39.)	P-40	
98	94	18 May 1942	16:05	LaGG-3		141♠	137	14 January 1943	10:43	B-25	north of Tamet
99♠	95	19 May 1942	09:42	R-5		142♠	138	14 January 1943	10:44	B-25	north of Tamet
100♠	96	19 May 1942	16:42	I-16		143♠	139	14 January 1943	14:32	Spitfire	
101♠	97	19 May 1942	16:45	I-16		144♠	140	14 January 1943	14:37	Spitfire	
102♠	98	19 May 1942	16:46	I-16		145	141	22 January 1943? (Note: According to Mathews and Foreman claimed on 21 January 1943.)	15:15	P-38	vicinity of Tripolitania
103♠	99	19 May 1942	16:50	I-16		146	142	22 January 1943?	15:16	P-38	vicinity of Tripolitania
104	100	5 June 1942	09:32	DB-3		147	143	23 January 1943	11:40	P-40	
105	101	13 June 1942	12:35	I-16		148	144	25 January 1943	12:35	P-40	
	—	13 June 1942	—	unknown		149	145	25 January 1943	12:38	P-40	
106	102	14 June 1942	18:58	I-16		150	146	27 January 1943	14:48	P-40	vicinity of Djebel Cheraline
107	103	14 June 1942	19:00	I-16		151	147	27 January 1943	15:01	P-40	vicinity of Djebel Cheraline
108	104	17 June 1942	17:35	MBR-2		152	148	27 January 1943	15:05	P-40	vicinity of Djebel Cheraline
109	105	19 June 1942	04:17	I-16		153	149	4 February 1943	14:40	B-17	
110	106	21 June 1942	18:35	I-16		154	—	4 February 1943	—	P-39? (Note: According to Mathews and Foreman claimed as a Boeing B-17 Flying Fortress.)	
111	107	21 June 1942	18:41	I-16		155	150	15 February 1943	07:45	Spitfire	vicinity of Thélepte
112	108	27 June 1942	06:35	I-16		156	151	15 February 1943	07:46	Spitfire	vicinity of Thelepte
113	109	27 June 1942	06:43	I-16		157♠	152	26 February 1943	10:55	Spitfire	vicinity of Gabès
—	—	11 October 1942	—	Spitfire		158♠	153	26 February 1943	14:05	P-40	vicinity of Gabès
114	110	13 October 1942	07:58	Spitfire	north of Malta	159♠	154	26 February 1943	14:15	P-40	vicinity of Gabès
115	111	13 October 1942	08:14	Spitfire	10 km (6.2 mi) north of Marsa Scirocco	160♠	155	26 February 1943	17:03	P-40	vicinity of Gabès
116	112	14 October 1942	17:59	Spitfire	30 km (19 mi) northwest of St. Paul's Bay	161♠	156	26 February 1943	17:08	P-40	vicinity of Gabès
117	113	17 October 1942	13:32	Spitfire	southeast of La Valletta, Malta	162	157	27 February 1943	10:50	Beaufighter	
118	114	2 November 1942	14:50	Spitfire	southwest of El Alamein	163	158	1 March 1943	14:58? (Note: According to Mathews and Foreman claimed at 14:56.)	Spitfire	
119♠	115	3 November 1942	12:08	P-40	southeast of El Alamein	164	159	3 March 1943	07:40	P-40	
120♠	116	3 November 1942	12:10	P-40	southeast of El Alamein	165	160	3 March 1943	07:45	P-40	
121♠	117	3 November 1942	15:55	P-40	northwest of Quotafiya	166	161	5 March 1943	07:58	P-40	
122♠	118	3 November 1942	15:59? (Note: According to Mathews and Foreman claimed at 15:58.)	P-40	northwest of Quotafiya	167	162	5 March 1943	08:20? (Note: According to Mathews and Foreman claimed at 13:23.)	Spitfire	
123♠	119	3 November 1942	16:12	P-40	northwest of El Alamein	168	163	6 March 1943	09:26? (Note: According to Mathews and Foreman claimed at 13:26.)	Spitfire	
124	120	5 November 1942	13:40	P-40	vicinity of Fuka	169	164	6 March 1943	09:28? (Note: According to Mathews and Foreman claimed at 13:28.)	Spitfire	
125	121	5 November 1942	13:50	P-40	vicinity of Fuka	170	165	7 March 1943	12:27	P-40	vicinity of Medenine
126	122	9 November 1942	14:50	P-40	east of Sollum	171	166	10 March 1943	16:33	P-40	vicinity of Medenine
127	123	10 November 1942	14:34	P-40	east of Sollum		—	13 March 1944	—	P-40	
128	124	10 November 1942	14:38	P-40	east of Sollum	172	167	23 March 1943	10:43	B-25	
129	125	11 November 1942	09:30	P-40	southeast of Gambut		—	23 March 1943	—	P-39	
130	126	11 November 1942	09:38	P-40	southeast of Gambut	173	168	24 March 1943	10:10	P-40	northwest of Fatnassa
131	127	7 December 1942	14:50	P-40	west of El Agheila	174	169	24 March 1943	10:12	P-40	northwest of Fatnassa
132	128	7 December 1942	14:52	P-40	west of El Agheila	175	170	25 March 1943	12:09	Boston	
133	129	8 December 1942	10:40	P-40		176	171	16 April 1943	15:50	Spitfire	northwest of Cap Bon
134	130	8 December 1942	10:55	P-40		177	172	29 April 1943	17:25	Spitfire	Ras Mostafa
– Stab of Jagdgruppe Süd –
178	173	2 December 1943	13:04	P-38	southeast of Saintes-Maries-de-la-Mer	179	174	2 December 1943	13:06	B-17	southeast of Saintes-Maries-de-la-Mer
– 6. Staffel of Jagdgeschwader 1 –
180	175	10 February 1944	11:13	B-17	PQ 05 Ost S/FN, vicinity of Zwolle	189*	180	25 February 1944	13:30	B-17	PQ 05 Ost S/US, vicinity of Heilbronn
181	—	10 February 1944	11:18	P-47	PQ 05 Ost S/FO, east of Zwolle	—	—	25 February 1944	13:43	B-17	PQ 04 Ost N/AT-8/9, vicinity of Stuttgart
182	176	21 February 1944	13:58	B-17	PQ 05 Ost S/GT/GU, 12–14 km (7.5–8.7 mi) west of Hanover	190*	181	25 February 1944	14:45	B-17	PQ 05 Ost S/US-1/5, vicinity of Heilbronn
183	177	21 February 1944	14:03	P-51	PQ 05 Ost S/GT-5, 5 km (3.1 mi) north of Stadthagen	191	—	25 February 1944	14:55	B-24	PQ 05 Ost S/UR-2/3, vicinity of Germersheim
184	178	21 February 1944	15:25	B-17	PQ 05 Ost S/GT-5, north-northwest of Rheine	192	182	3 March 1944	11:40	P-51	PQ 05 Ost S/EU-3/6, vicinity of Verden
185	—	22 February 1944	12:51	B-17	PQ 05 Ost S/KO, northwest of Bottrop	193	183	6 March 1944	12:00	B-17	PQ 05 Ost S/FR-4, east of Lingen
186	—	22 February 1944	14:18	B-17	PQ 05 Ost S/HO-1/4, north of Grevenbroich	194	184	6 March 1944	12:10	B-17	PQ 05 Ost S/FS-4/5, southwest of Verden
187	179	24 February 1944	12:30	B-24	PQ 05 Ost S/GR-8, vicinity of Osnabrück	195	—	6 March 1944	14:45	B-17	PQ 05 Ost S/GO/GN, vicinity of Deventer
188	—	24 February 1944	12:34	B-24	PQ 05 Ost S/GS-9, east of Osnabrück						
– Stab II. Gruppe of Jagdgeschwader 1 –
196	185	29 March 1944	13:25	P-51	PQ 15 Ost S/HB-9, south of Söllingen	200	188	22 April 1944	20:08	B-24	PQ 05 Ost S/JQ, vicinity of Ahlen
197	186	29 March 1944	13:35	P-51	PQ 15 Ost S/JB-9, west of Halberstadt	201	189	29 April 1944	10:56	P-47	PQ 15 Ost S/HB, northwest of Halberstadt
198	187	8 April 1944	13:50	B-24	PQ 15 Ost S/EB/FB, southwest of Salzwedel	202	190	29 April 1944	10:59	B-24	PQ 15 Ost S/GB, east-southeast of Braunschweig
199	—	11 April 1944	10:59	B-17	PQ 15 Ost S/FB-7, 10 km (6.2 mi) northeast of Fallersleben						
– Stab of Jagdgeschwader 3 –
203	191	7 August 1944	14:40	P-51	PQ 04 Ost N/CD-2/5 southeast of Chartres	205	193	1 January 1945	19:25	Typhoon	Eindhoven air base
204	192	1 January 1945	09:23	Typhoon	Eindhoven air base						
– Stab III. Gruppe of Ergänzungsjagdgeschwader 2 –
206	194	19 March 1945	12:00+	P-51	vicinity of Dresden	214	199	9 April 1945	10:05	B-26	9 km (5.6 mi) southwest of Amberg
207	195	21 March 1945	—	B-24		215	200	9 April 1945	10:??	B-26	vicinity of Amberg
208	196	24 March 1945	—	B-24	vicinity of Stuttgart	216	201	12 April 1945? (Note: According to Mathews and Foreman claimed on 17 April 1945.)	—	B-26	
209	197	24 March 1945	—	P-51	vicinity of Stuttgart	217	202	18 April 1945	—	P-47	
210	—	27 March 1945	—	P-47	vicinity of Lechfeld	218	203	18 April 1945	—	P-47	
211	—	27 March 1945	—	P-47	vicinity of Lechfeld	219	204	19 April 1945	—	P-51	
212	—	27 March 1945	—	P-47	vicinity of Lechfeld	220	205	19 April 1945	—	P-51	
213	198	4 April 1945	15:00+	P-51							
– Jagdverband 44 –
221	206	27 April 1945	—	P-47		223	208	28 April 1945? (Note: According to Mathews and Foreman claimed on 29 April 1945.)	—	P-47	vicinity of Bad Aibling
222	207	27 April 1945	—	P-47							
