= Egon Albrecht-Lemke =

German fighter ace and Knight's Cross recipient (1918–1944)

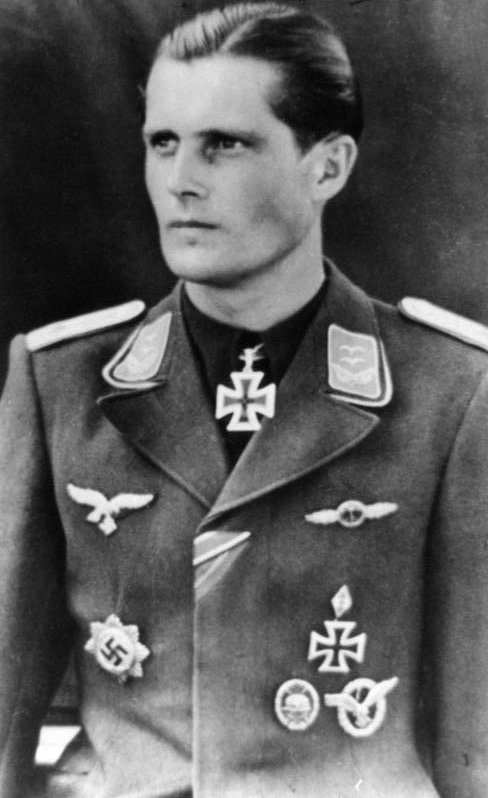
- Born: 19 May 1918; Curitiba, Brazil
- Died: 25 August 1944 (aged 26); St. Claude, France
- Cause of death: Killed in action
- Burial place: War cemetery in Beauvais, France
- Military career
- Allegiance: Nazi Germany
- Branch: Luftwaffe
- Service years: 1939–1944
- Rank: Hauptmann (captain)
- Units: ZG 76, SKG 210, ZG 1, JG 76
- Conflicts: World War II: Operation Barbarossa; Defense of the Reich; Operation Overlord
- Awards: Knight's Cross of the Iron Cross

Egon Albrecht-Lemke (Note: According to Scherzer name is Egon Albrecht-Lemke.) (19 May 1918 – 25 August 1944) was a German-Brazilian Luftwaffe fighter pilot and recipient of the Knight's Cross of the Iron Cross during World War II. Albrecht claimed 25 aerial victories, 10 over the Western Front and 15 over the Eastern Front.

== Career ==
Albrecht-Lemke was born on 19 May 1918 in Curitiba, Brazil. He was the son of Frederico Albrecht and Hedwig Elditt Albrecht, and moved to Germany before turning 18, and joined the Nazi Party in 1937. By 1940, Albrecht-Lemke was serving with 6. Staffel of Zerstörergeschwader 1 (ZG 1—1st Destroyer Wing) operating Messerschmitt Bf 110 Zerstörer (destroyer) heavy fighter. After redesignation as 9./Zerstörergeschwader 76 (ZG 76) in June 1940, and then 6. Staffel of Schnellkampfgeschwader 210 (SKG 210—210th Fast Bomber Wing) in April 1941, Albrecht flew combat operation over the Eastern Front. In January 1942 6./SKG 210 became 6./ZG 1.

Albrecht-Lemke was appointed Staffelkapitän (squadron leader), 1./ZG 1 in June 1942. Now an Oberleutnant, Albrecht-Lemke was awarded the Knight's Cross of the Iron Cross (Ritterkreuz des Eisernen Kreuzes) in May 1943 for 15 aerial victories, along with 11 aircraft, 162 motor vehicles, 254 covered vehicles, 3 locomotives, 8 Flak positions, 12 anti-tank gun positions and 8 infantry positions destroyed on the ground.

In October 1943, Albrecht succeeded Hauptmann Karl-Heinrich Matern who was killed in action on 8 October as Gruppenkommandeur (group commander) of II. Gruppe of ZG 1. The unit was relocated to the Western Front, based on the Atlantic coast of France, flying missions over the Bay of Biscay. Later in 1943, the Gruppe was transferred to Austria to combat the incursions from the Italian-based United States Army Air Forces (USAAF) 15th Air Force.

After heavy losses in July 1944, II./ZG 1 converted to the Messerschmitt Bf 109 G fighter and were redesignated as III./Jagdgeschwader 76. Albrecht-Lemke then led the unit in operations over the Invasion front in western France.

On 25 August 1944 Albrecht was intercepted by USAAF P-51 Mustang fighters and shot down in his Bf 109 G-14 near Creil. Albrecht-Lemke bailed out of his stricken aircraft but was dead when found on the ground.

Albrecht-Lemke was credited with 25 victories, with 15 victories claimed over the Eastern Front and 10 over the Western Front. This total included at least six B-24 four-engine USAAF bombers. In addition he claimed 11 aircraft destroyed on the ground on the Eastern Front.

== Summary of career ==
=== Aerial victory claims ===
Mathews and Foreman, authors of Luftwaffe Aces — Biographies and Victory Claims, researched the German Federal Archives and found records for more than 18 aerial victory claims. This figure includes at least eleven aerial victories on the Eastern Front and seven four-engined bombers on the Western Front.

=== Awards ===
- Front Flying Clasp of the Luftwaffe
- Wound Badge (1939)
  - in Black or Silver
- Iron Cross (1939)
  - 2nd Class
  - 1st Class
- Honour Goblet of the Luftwaffe on 21 September 1942 as Leutnant and pilot
- German Cross in Gold on 3 December 1942 as Leutnant in the II./Zerstörergeschwader 1
- Knight's Cross of the Iron Cross on 22 May 1943 as Oberleutnant and Staffelführer of the 9./Zerstörergeschwader 76 (Note: According to Scherzer as Staffelkapitän of the 6./Zerstörergeschwader 1.)
