= Ergänzungs-Jagdgruppe Ost =

- Active: 1942–44
- Country: Nazi Germany
- Branch: Luftwaffe
- Type: Fighter Aircraft
- Role: Training Unit
- Decorations: World War II

Ergänzungs-Jagdgruppe Ost (EJGr Ost) (Note: For an explanation of the meaning of Luftwaffe unit designation see Luftwaffe Organization) (Supplementary Fighter Group, East) was a fighter pilot training unit of the German Luftwaffe in World War II. It was formed on 27 January 1942 in Krakau and renamed Jagdgruppe Ost (JGr Ost) on 25 November 1942. Its main purpose was to provide specialized training for new fighter pilots destined for the Eastern Front. Training was provided by experienced Eastern Front veterans, who were rotated in and out of this unit.

== History ==
On 3 January 1942, the Luftwaffe ordered the disbandment of the various Ergänzungs-Jagdgruppen, supplementary fighter groups attached to the various fighter wings. The order was carried out by 10 January and the subsequently released commanding officers and infrastructure was used to form new regular fighter groups as well as new training units. In consequence the following regular fighter groups were created:

- a new III. and IV. Gruppe (3rd and 4th group) of Jagdgeschwader 1
- a new I. Gruppe (1st group) of Jagdgeschwader 3
- a III. Gruppe (3rd group) of Jagdgeschwader 5

Additionally, three new training units were also formed, these were the Ergänzungs-Jagdgruppen West, Ost and Süd. Ergänzungs-Jagdgruppe Ost was created from the Ergänzungs-Jagdgruppe of Jagdgeschwader 51 (JG 51—51st Fighter Wing). In January 1942, Erg./JG 51 was based in La Rochelle, France. In February, Erg./JG 51 was moved to Krakau where it formed the nucleus of Ergänzungs-Jagdgruppe Ost.

== Commanding officers ==
=== Gruppenkommandeure ===
- Hauptmann Günther Beise, February 1942 – 12 May 1942
- Hauptmann Hubertus von Bonin, May 1942 – 22 May 1942
- Major Werner Andres, 23 May 1942 – 31 January 1943
- Oberstleutnant Hermann Graf, 1 February 1943 – April 1943
- Major Werner Andres, April 1943 – 30 June 1943
- Major Viktor Bauer, 1 July 1943 – 4 November 1944
