= Ergänzungs-Jagdgruppe West =

- Active: 1942–44
- Country: Nazi Germany
- Branch: Luftwaffe
- Type: Fighter Aircraft
- Role: Training Unit

Ergänzungs-Jagdgruppe West (EJGr West) (Supplementary Fighter Group, West) was a fighter pilot training unit of the German Luftwaffe in World War II. It was formed on 6 February 1942 in Cazaux and renamed Jagdgruppe West (JGr West) on 30 November 1942.

== Commanding officers ==
=== Gruppenkommandeure ===
- Major Jürgen Roth, 6 February 1942 – 4 January 1943
- Major Georg Michalek, 5 January 1943 – 3 January 1944
- Hauptmann Herbert Wehnelt, 4 January 1944 – 4 November 1944
