= List of World War II aces from Germany: M–P =

This is a list of fighter aces in World War II from Germany with their surname starting from M to P. A flying ace or fighter ace is a military aviator credited with shooting down five or more enemy aircraft during aerial combat. Aces are listed alphabetically by last name.

== Aces ==
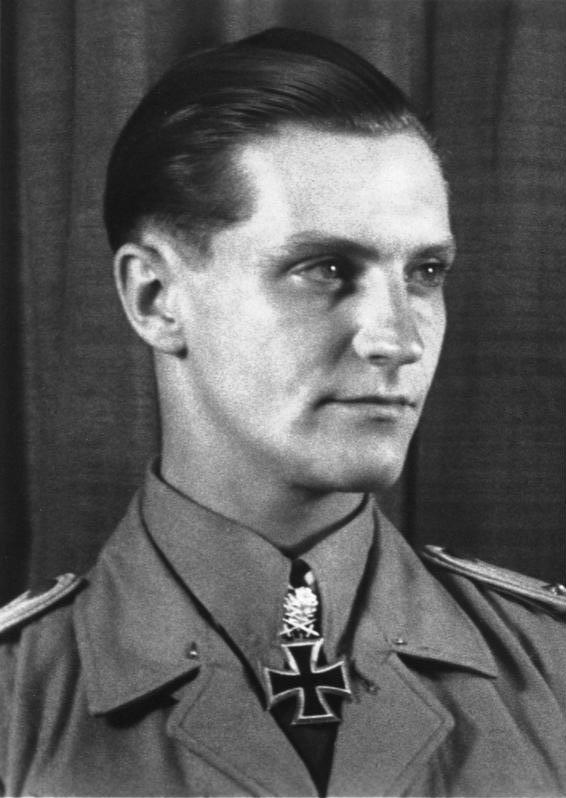
Hans-Joachim Marseille, the highest scoring German ace over the Western Allies

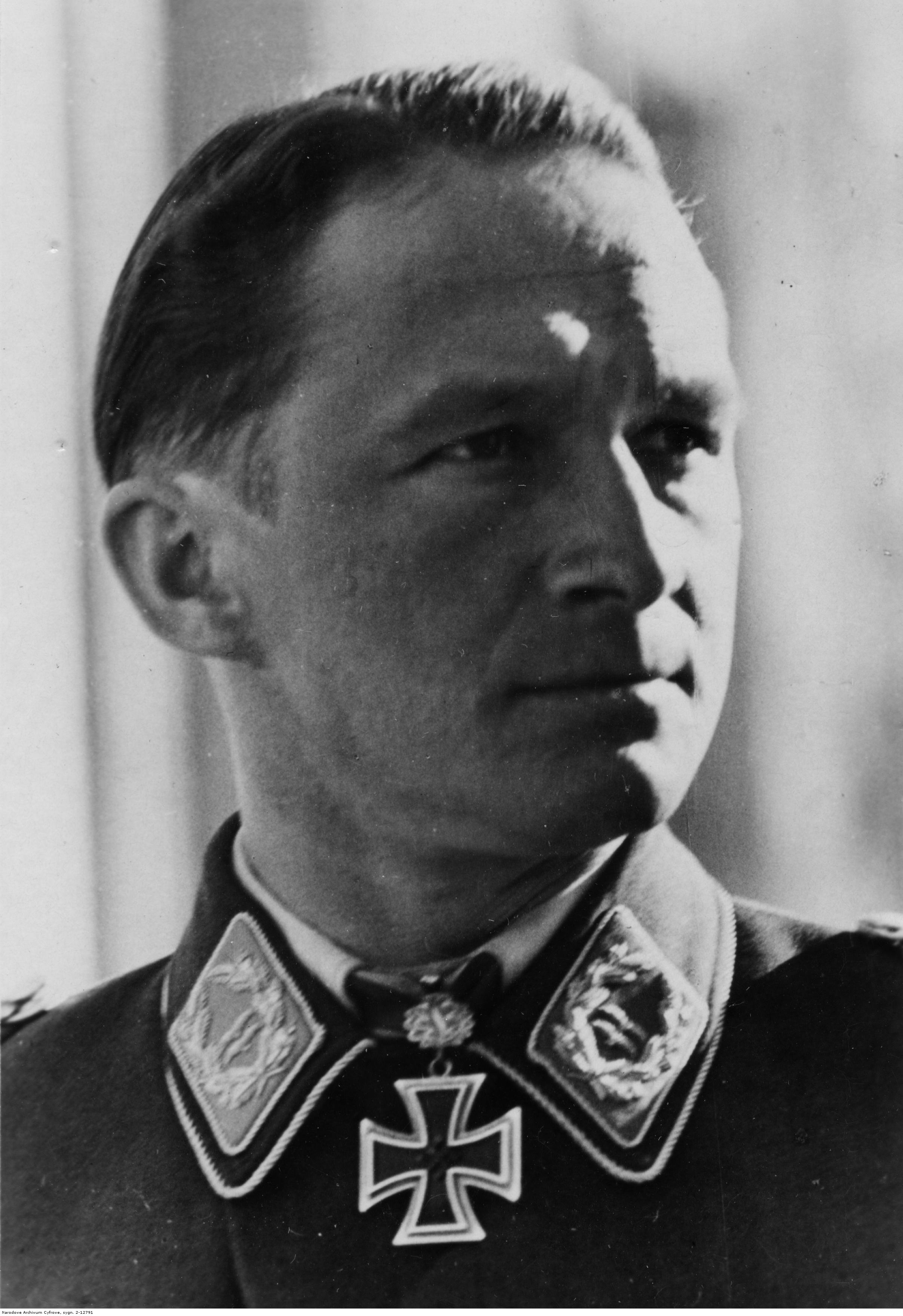
Egon Mayer, claimed 26 heavy bombers shot down

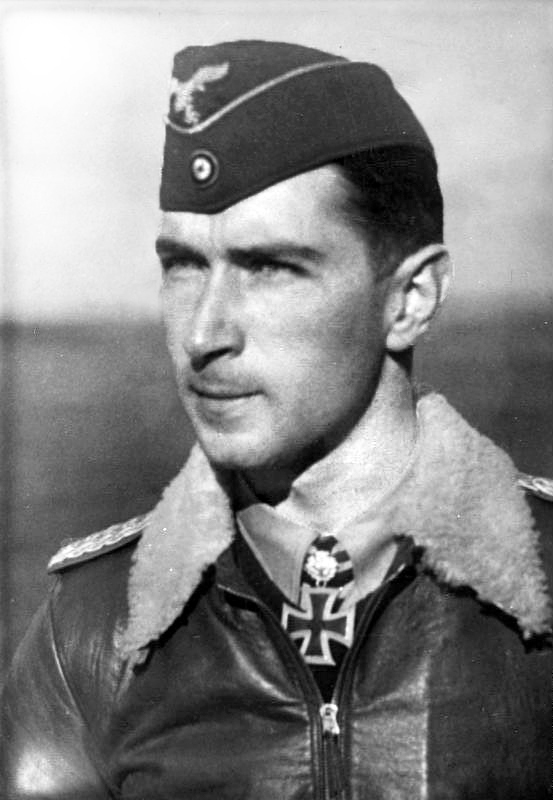
Werner Mölders, the first pilot to claim 100 aerial victories

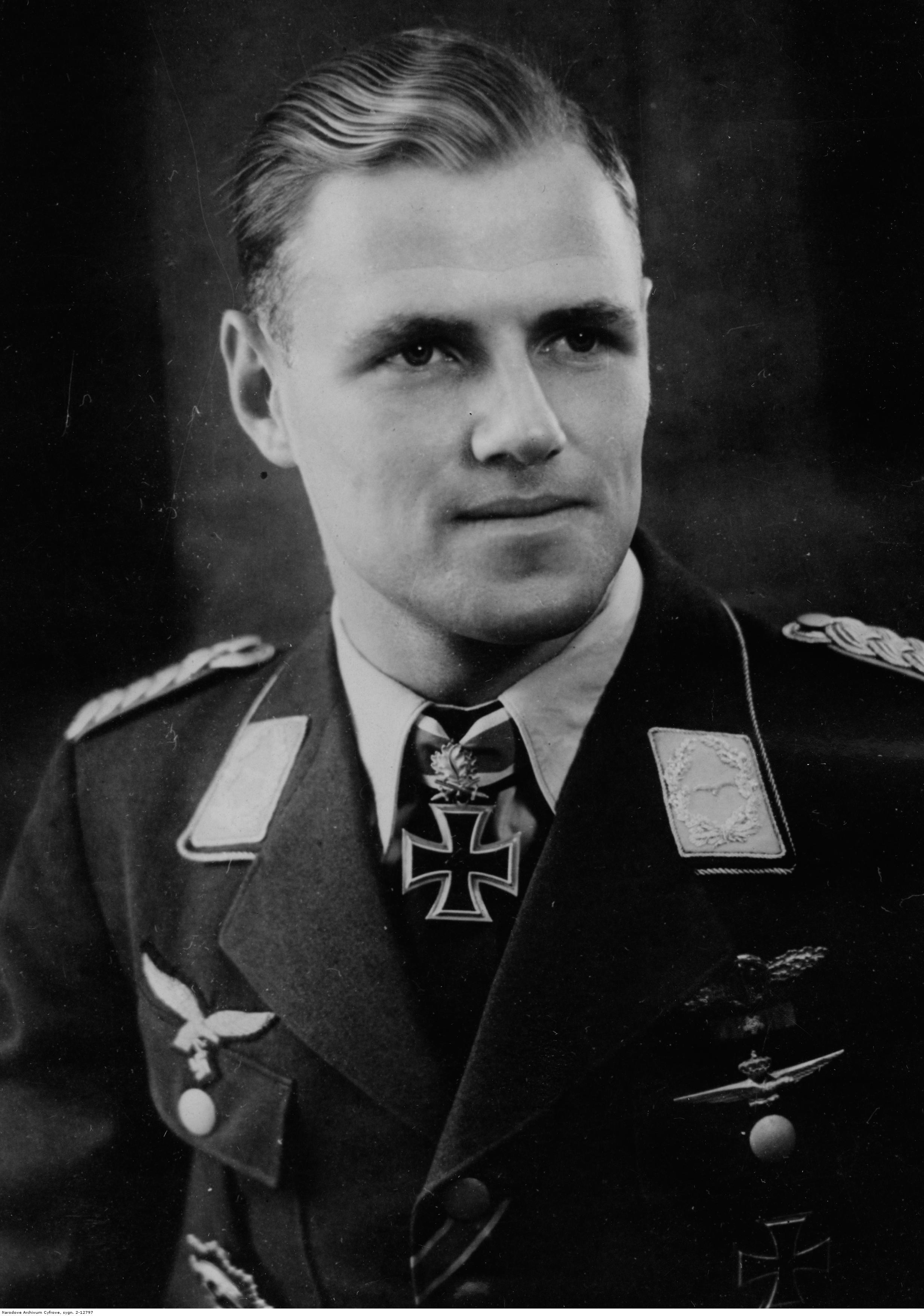
Joachim Müncheberg, killed in North Africa

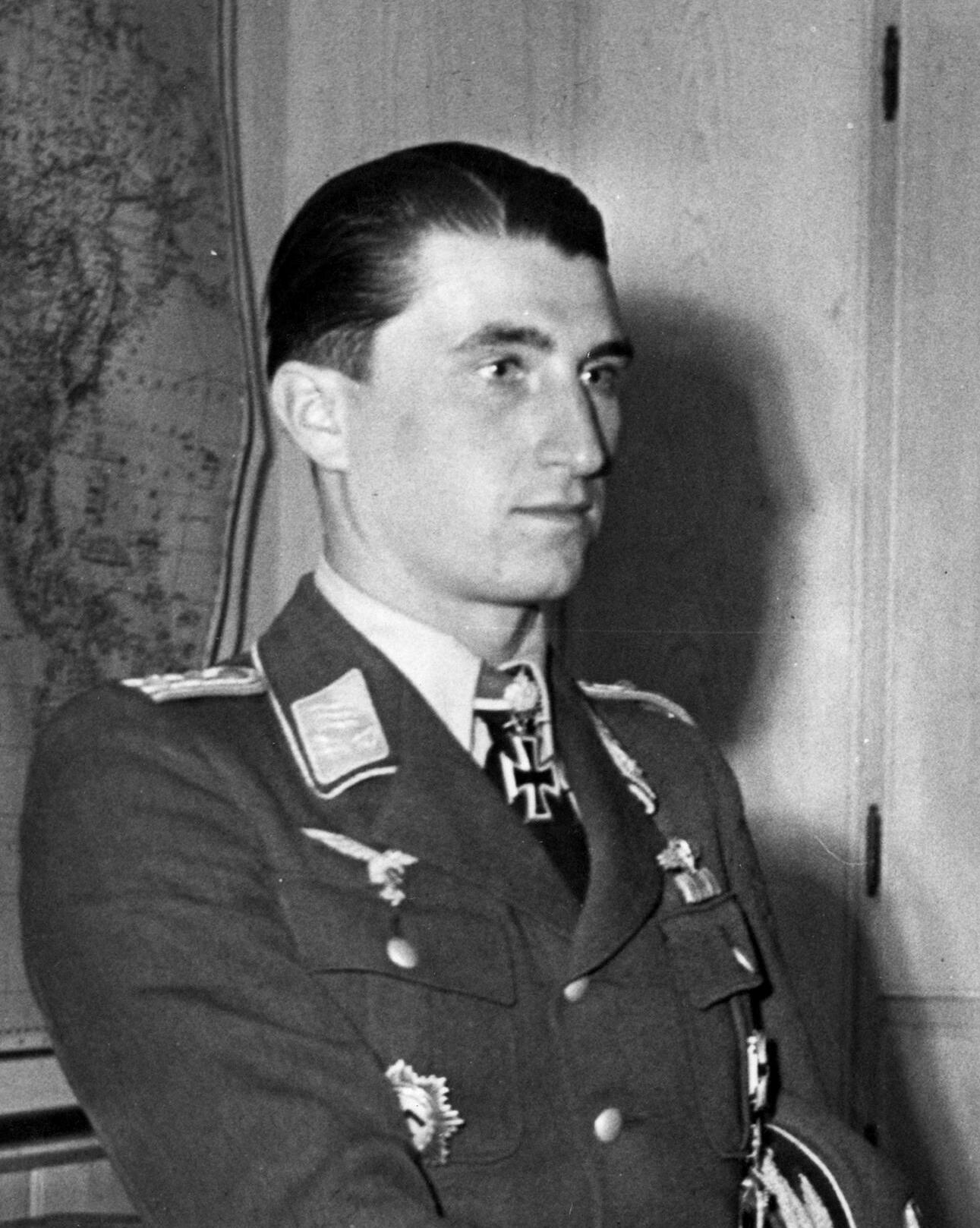
Walter Nowotny, the first pilot to claim 250 aerial victories

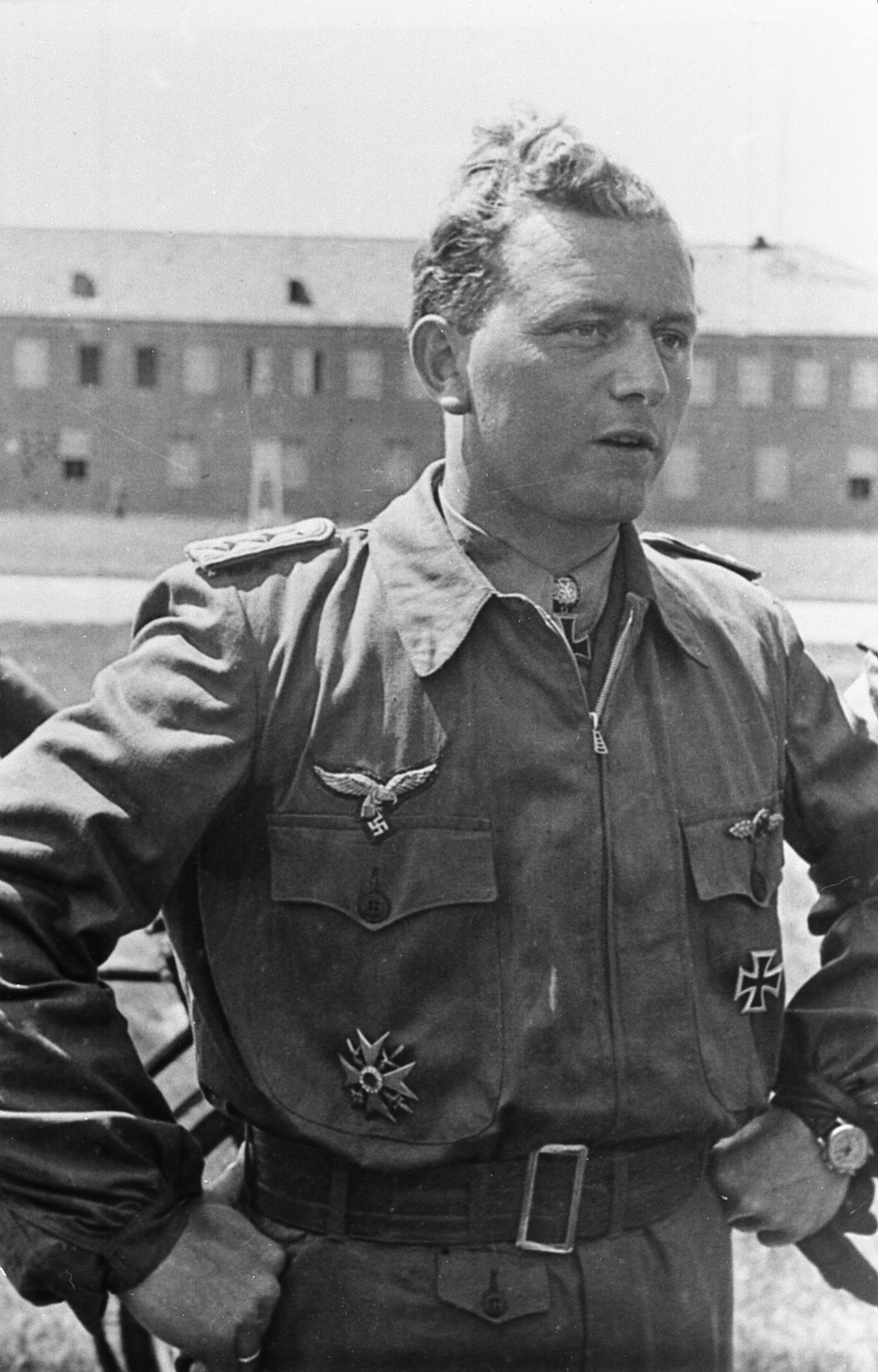
Walter Oesau, the third pilot to claim 100 aerial victories

By surname: A–F • G–L • Q–S • T–Z

This along with the * (asterisk), indicates that the pilot was either killed in action (KIA), missing in action (MIA), died of wounds (DOW), killed in a flying accident (KIFA), or killed in a car accident (KICA).
This and the / (slash) indicates information discrepancies listed by Aders, Boiten, Caldwell, Girbig, Held, Obermaier, Spick, Ring, Mathews, Foreman and Zabecki.

=== M ===
| Name | Rank | Claims | Unit | Notes |
|---|---|---|---|---|
| Ernst Maak | Hauptmann | 6 | JG 27, JG 11 | |
| Werner Machold | Hauptmann | 32 | JG 2 | Knight's Cross |
| Walter Mackens* | Oberfeldwebel | 9 | JG 52, JG 53, JG 300 | KIA 5 January 1944 |
| Wilhelm Mackenstedt | Oberfeldwebel | 6 | JG 26 | |
| Anton Mader | Oberstleutnant | 86/78 | JG 2, JG 77, JG 54 | Knight's Cross |
| Lothar Mai* | Oberfeldwebel | 45/44 | JG 51 | KIA 27 August 1943 |
| Karl Maisch | Oberfeldwebel | 17 | NJG 5, NJG 100 | |
| Wilhelm Makrocki* | Major | 9 | ZG 76, ZG 26 | Knight's Cross; KIA 21 May 1941 |
| Günther Freiherr von Maltzahn | Oberst | 68 | JG 53 | Knight's Cross with Oak Leaves |
| Rudolf Mangelsdorf | Oberfeldwebel | 8 | NJG 3, NJG 2 | |
| Egon Mangold | Hauptmann | 5 | 10.(NJ)/ZG 1, NJG 100, NJG 200 | |
| Gerhard Marburg* | Oberfeldwebel | 7 | JG 3, JG 4 | KIFA 3 September 1944 |
| Heinz Marquardt | Oberfeldwebel | 121 | JG 51 | Knight's Cross |
| Hans-Joachim Marseille* | Hauptmann | 158/152 | JG 52, JG 27 | Knight's Cross with Oak Leaves, Swords and Diamonds; KIFA 30 September 1942 |
| Karl-Heinrich Matern | Hauptmann | 12 | ZG 1, ZG 76 | Knight's Cross |
| Otto Materne* | Hauptmann | 5 | NJG 4 | KIA 6 September 1944 |
| Walter Matoni | Major | 34 | JG 27, JG 26, JG 2, JG 11 | Knight's Cross |
| Kurt Matzak | Oberleutnant | 16 | NJG 1 | |
| Willi Maximowitz* | Oberfeldwebel | 15+ | JG 1, JG 3 | MIA 20 April 1945 |
| Marian Mazurek* | Feldwebel | 34 | JG 53 | KIA 9 June 1943 |
| Egon Mayer* | Oberstleutnant | 102 | JG 2 | Knight's Cross with Oak Leaves and Swords; KIA 2 March 1944 incl. 26 heavy bombers |
| Hans-Karl Mayer | Hauptmann | 39 (incl. 8 in Spain) | JG 53, JG 26 | Knight's Cross; KIA 17 October 1940 |
| Wilhelm Mayer | Leutnant | 27 | JG 26 | Knight's Cross |
| Maximilian Mayerl | Hauptmann | 76 | JG 51, EJG 1 | Knight's Cross |
| Erhardt Mecke | Feldwebel | 10 | JG 5 | |
| Helmut Meckel | Oberleutnant | 25 | JG 3 | Knight's Cross; KIFA 8 May 1943 |
| Ulrich von Meien | Major | 8 | KG 27, NJG 100, NJG 5 | |
| Johann-Hermann Meier* | Leutnant | 77 | JG 26, JG 52 | Knight's Cross; KIA 15 March 1944 |
| Julius Meimberg | Major | 53 | JG 2, JG 53 | Knight's Cross |
| Hans Meissner | Leutnant | 19 | NJG 3 | |
| Dieter Meister* | Leutnant | 10+ | KG 40, ZG 1, JG 2 | KIA 21 November 1944 |
| Ludwig Meister | Hauptmann | 41/33 | NJG 1, NJG 4 | Knight's Cross |
| Karl-Heinz Meltzer | Feldwebel | 61 | JG 52 | |
| Arthur Mendl | Feldwebel | 8+ | JG 5 | |
| Karl Mentnich | Oberfeldwebel | 6 | JG 27 | |
| Hans-Jörg Merkle | Feldwebel | 30 | JG 52 | |
| Helmut Mertens | Hauptmann | 97 | JG 3 | Knight's Cross |
| Werner Methfessel* | Hauptmann | 8 | LG 1 | KIA 17 May 1940 |
| Rudolf Metz* | Leutnant | 10 | JG 5, JG 3, JG 4 | KIA 6 October 1944 |
| Manfred Meurer* | Hauptmann | 65/63 | NJG 1, NJG 5 | Knight's Cross with Oak Leaves; KIA 21/22 January 1944 |
| Karl-Heinz "Conny" Meyer | Major | 11 | JG 26 | |
| Eduard Meyer* | Leutnant | 22 | ZG 26 | Knight's Cross; KIA 31 March 1942 |
| Otto Meyer* | Hauptmann | 21/14 | JG 27 | KIA 12 July 1944 |
| Walter Meyer | Leutnant | 18 | JG 54, JG 26 | |
| Georg Michalek | Major | 59 | JG 3 | Knight's Cross |
| Gerhard Michalski | Oberstleutnant | 73 | JG 53, JG 4 | Knight's Cross with Oak Leaves |
| Rudolf Miethig* | Hauptmann | 101/100 | JG 52 | Knight's Cross; KIA 10 June 1943 |
| Klaus Mietusch* | Major | 72 | JG 26 | Knight's Cross with Oak Leaves; KIA 17 September 1944 |
| Walter Milius | Major | 8 | NJG 1, NJG 3, NJG 4, JG 400 | |
| Wilhelm Mink* | Oberfeldwebel | 72 | JG 51, EJG 1 | Knight's Cross; KIA 12 March 1945 |
| Heinz Misch | Feldwebel | 8 | NJG 2, NJG 3 | |
| Bruno Mischkot | Leutnant | 7 | JG 26, JG 3, JG 2, EJG 2 | |
| Helmut Mißner* | Oberfeldwebel | 82 | JG 54 | Knight's Cross; KIA 12 September 1944 |
| Ernst-Wilhelm Modrow | Hauptmann | 33 | NJG 1 | Knight's Cross |
| "Vati" Werner Mölders* | Oberst | 115 (incl. 14 in Spain)/108 | JG 51 | Knight's Cross with Oak Leaves, Swords and Diamonds; KIFA 22 November 1941 |
| Klaus Möller | Oberfeldwebel | 10 | NJG 3, NJG 2 | |
| Wilhelm Moritz | Major | 44/41 | JG 51, JG 3 | Knight's Cross |
| Wilhelm Morlock* | Oberfeldwebel | 16 | NJG 1 | KIA 4/5 November 1944 |
| August Mors* | Leutnant | 60 | JG 5 | Knight's Cross; KIA 8 August 1944 |
| August Müller* | Oberfeldwebel | 49 | JG 51 | KIA 6 April 1945 |
| Friedrich-Karl "Nasen" Müller | Major | 30/29 | N.J.V.K., JG Herrmann,JG 300, NJGr 10, NJG 11 | Knight's Cross |
| Friedrich-Karl "Tutti" Müller* | Oberstleutnant | 140/139 | JG 53, JG 3 | Knight's Cross with Oak Leaves; KIA 29 May 1944 incl. 23 heavy bombers |
| Fritz Müller | Leutnant | 23 | JG 7 | |
| Hans-Hermann Müller | Hauptmann | 16 | NJG 2, NJG 3, SG 151, NSGr 20 | |
| Kurt Müller* | Oberlfeldwebel | 5 | ZG 2 | KIA 7 April 1940 |
| Rudolf Müller* | Oberlfeldwebel | 94 | JG 5 | Knight's Cross; Died in POW camp 21 June 1943 |
| Siegfried Müller | Leutnant | 10 | JG 51, JG 3, JG 7 | |
| Wilhelm Müller | Oberfeldwebel | 10 | JG 26 | |
| Gerhard Müller-Dühne | Leutnant | 5 | JG 26 | |
| Joachim Müncheberg* | Major | 135 | JG 26, JG 51, JG 77 | Knight's Cross with Oak Leaves and Swords; KIA 23 March 1943 |
| Georg Munderloh | Oberfeldwebel | 18 | JG 54 | |
| Leopold Münster* | Leutnant | 95 | JG 3 | Knight's Cross with Oak Leaves; KIA 8 May 1944 |
| Karl Munz | Leutnant | 60 | JG 52, JG 7 | |
| Hubert Mütherich | Oberleutnant | 43/39 | JG 51, JG 54 | |

=== N ===
| Name | Rank | Claims | Unit | Notes |
|---|---|---|---|---|
| Josef Nabrich* | Oberleutnant | 18/17 | NJG 101, NJG 1 | KIA 27 November 1944 |
| Fritz Felix Nächster | Oberleutnant | 5 | JG 51, JGr Drontheim, JG 25, JG 52 | |
| Heinz Nacke | Major | 12 | ZG 76, NJG 3 | Knight's Cross |
| Franz Nägele* | Leutnant | 19 | JG 77 | KIA 9 June 1944 |
| Johannes Naumann | Major | 34 | JG 26, JG 6, JG 7 | Knight's Cross |
| Kurt Necessany* | Oberleutnant | 6 | KG 40, ZG 1 | MIA 14 February 1944 |
| Willi Nemitz* | Leutnant | 81/82 | JG 52 | Knight's Cross; KIA 11 April 1943 |
| Wolfgang Neu | Hauptmann | 9 | JG 26 | |
| Hermann Neuhoff | Leutnant | 40 | JG 53 | Knight's Cross |
| Eduard Neumann | Oberstleutnant | 13 (incl. 2 in Spain) | JG 26, JG 27 | |
| Helmut Neumann | Leutnant | 62 | JG 5 | Knight's Cross |
| Klaus Neumann | Leutnant | 37 | JG 51, JG 3, JG 7, JV 44 | Knight's Cross |
| Berthold Ney | Major | 19/8 | NJG 2, NJG 3 | WIA 3/4 March 1945 |
| Siegfried Ney* | Oberfeldwebel | 12/11 | NJG 1, NJG 2 | KIA 27/28 March 1942 |
| Hans-Wolfgang von Niebelschütz* | Hauptmann | 9 | NJG 4, NJG 5 | KIA 2/3 January 1944 |
| Karl-Gottfried Nordmann | Oberst | 78/75 | JG 51 | Knight's Cross with Oak Leaves |
| Jakob Norz* | Leutnant | 117/104 | JG 5 | Knight's Cross; KIA 16 September 1944 |
| "Nowi" Walter Nowotny* | Major | 258/256 | JG 54, Kdo Nowotny, JG 101 | Knight's Cross with Oak Leaves, Swords and Diamonds; KIA 8 November 1944 |

=== O ===
| Name | Rank | Claims | Unit | Notes |
|---|---|---|---|---|
| Heinz Oberheide* | Feldwebel | 10/7 | NJG 3 | KIA 8 February 1945 |
| Anton Oberhofer* | Unteroffizier | 12 | JG 52 | KIA 7 March 1944 |
| Friedrich Obleser | Oberleutnant | 120/112+ | JG 52 | Knight's Cross |
| Walter Oesau* | Oberst | 125 (incl. 8 in Spain)/127 | JG 1, JG 2, JG 51, J/88 | Knight's Cross with Oak Leaves and Swords; KIA 11 May 1944 |
| Walter Ohlrogge | Leutnant | 77 | JG 3, JG 7 | Knight's Cross |
| Robert Olejnik | Major | 42 | JG 2, JG 3, JG 1, JG 400 | Knight's Cross |
| Emil Omert* | Hauptmann | 70/55 | JG 3, JG 2, JG 77 | Knight's Cross; KIA 24 April 1944 |
| Theo Osterkamp | Generalleutnant | 38 (incl. 32 in World War I) | JG 51 | Knight's Cross |
| Max-Hellmuth Ostermann* | Oberleutnant | 102 | ZG 1, JG 54 | Knight's Cross with Oak Leaves and Swords; KIA 9 August 1942 |

=== P ===
| Name | Rank | Claims | Unit | Notes |
|---|---|---|---|---|
| Karl Paashaus* | Oberleutnant | 15 | JG 53 | German Cross; KIA 22 August 1944 |
| Horst Patuschka* | Hauptmann | 23 | NJG 2 | Knight's Cross; KIA 6 March 1943 |
| Georg Pavenzinger | Oberfeldwebel | 5 | JG 51 | |
| Hans Peterburs* | Oberfeldwebel | 18 | ZG 76, ZG 1 | Knight's Cross; KIA 11 January 1944 |
| Viktor Petermann | Oberleutnant | 64 | JG 52, JG 7 | Knight's Cross |
| Erhard Peters* | Hauptmann | 23 | NJG 3, NJG 4 | KIA 20 February 1944 |
| Horst Petzschler | Fanhnenjunker-Oberfeldwebel | 26 | JG 3, JG 51 | Ehrenpokal der Luftwaffe |
| Karl-Georg Pfeiffer | Oberfeldwebel | 10 | NJG 1 | |
| Rudolf Pflanz* | Hauptmann | 52 | JG 2 | Knight's Cross; KIA 31 July 1942 |
| Helmut Pfüller | Oberfeldwebel | 27+ | JG 51 | |
| Hans Philipp* | Major | 206/195 | JG 54, JG 1 | Knight's Cross with Oak Leaves and Swords; KIA 8 October 1943 |
| Wilhelm Philipp | Oberfeldwebel | 81/79+ | JG 54 | Knight's Cross |
| Johann Pichler | Leutnant | 75 | JG 77 | Knight's Cross |
| Anton-Rudolf Piffer* | Leutnant | 35/29/26 | JG 1 | Knight's Cross; KIA 17 June 1944 |
| Rolf Pingel | Major | 28 (incl. 6 in Spain) | JG 26, JG 53 | Knight's Cross |
| Karl-Heinrich Plücker* | Oberleutnant | 42 | JG 52 | KIA 10 May 1944 |
| Josef Pöhs* | Oberleutnant | 43 | JG 54 | Knight's Cross; KIA 30 December 1943 |
| Hubert Pölz | Hauptmann | 11 | StG 3 | Knight's Cross with Oak Leaves |
| Hans Prager | Leutnant | 16 | JG 26, JG 54 | |
| Alexander Preinfalk* | Oberfeldwebel | 80 | JG 77, JG 51, JG 53 | Knight's Cross; KIA 12 December 1944 |
| Bela Preisler | Unteroffizier | 6 | JG 5 | |
| Rolf Prigge | Oberfänrich | 5 | JG 27, JG 7 | |
| Josef "Pips" Priller | Oberst | 101 | JG 51, JG 26 | Knight's Cross with Oak Leaves and Swords |
| Herbert Puschmann | Hauptmann | 54 | JG 51 | Knight's Cross |
