= List of Knight's Cross of the Iron Cross recipients (N) =

The Knight's Cross of the Iron Cross (German: Ritterkreuz des Eisernen Kreuzes) and its variants were the highest awards in the military and paramilitary forces of Nazi Germany during World War II. The Knight's Cross of the Iron Cross was awarded for a wide range of reasons and across all ranks, from a senior commander for skilled leadership of his troops in battle to a low-ranking soldier for a single act of extreme gallantry. A total of 7,321 awards were made between its first presentation on 30 September 1939 and its last bestowal on 17 June 1945. (Note: Großadmiral and President of Germany Karl Dönitz, Hitler's successor as Head of State (Staatsoberhaupt) and Supreme Commander of the Armed Forces, had ordered the cessation of all promotions and awards as of 11 May 1945 (Dönitz-decree). Consequently the last Knight's Cross awarded to Oberleutnant zur See of the Reserves Georg-Wolfgang Feller on 17 June 1945 must therefore be considered a de facto but not de jure hand-out.) This number is based on the analysis and acceptance of the order commission of the Association of Knight's Cross Recipients (AKCR). Presentations were made to members of the three military branches of the Wehrmacht—the Heer (Army), Kriegsmarine (Navy) and Luftwaffe (Air Force)—as well as the Waffen-SS, the Reichsarbeitsdienst (RAD—Reich Labour Service) and the Volkssturm (German national militia). There were also 43 recipients in the military forces of allies of the Third Reich.

These recipients are listed in the 1986 edition of Walther-Peer Fellgiebel's book, Die Träger des Ritterkreuzes des Eisernen Kreuzes 1939–1945 — The Bearers of the Knight's Cross of the Iron Cross 1939–1945. Fellgiebel was the former chairman and head of the order commission of the AKCR. In 1996, the second edition of this book was published with an addendum delisting 11 of these original recipients. Author Veit Scherzer has cast doubt on a further 193 of these listings. The majority of the disputed recipients had received the award in 1945, when the deteriorating situation of Germany in the final days of World War II in Europe left a number of nominations incomplete and pending in various stages of the approval process.

Listed here are the 145 Knight's Cross recipients whose last name starts with "N". Fellgiebel himself delisted two and Scherzer has challenged the validity of two more of these listings. The recipients are ordered alphabetically by last name. The rank listed is the recipient's rank at the time the Knight's Cross was awarded.

== Background ==
The Knight's Cross of the Iron Cross and its higher grades were based on four separate enactments. The first enactment, Reichsgesetzblatt I S. 1573 of 1 September 1939 instituted the Iron Cross (Eisernes Kreuz), the Knight's Cross of the Iron Cross and the Grand Cross of the Iron Cross (Großkreuz des Eisernen Kreuzes). Article 2 of the enactment mandated that the award of a higher class be preceded by the award of all preceding classes. As the war progressed, some of the recipients of the Knight's Cross distinguished themselves further and a higher grade, the Knight's Cross of the Iron Cross with Oak Leaves (Ritterkreuz des Eisernen Kreuzes mit Eichenlaub), was instituted. The Oak Leaves, as they were commonly referred to, were based on the enactment Reichsgesetzblatt I S. 849 of 3 June 1940. In 1941, two higher grades of the Knight's Cross were instituted. The enactment Reichsgesetzblatt I S. 613 of 28 September 1941 introduced the Knight's Cross of the Iron Cross with Oak Leaves and Swords (Ritterkreuz des Eisernen Kreuzes mit Eichenlaub und Schwertern) and the Knight's Cross of the Iron Cross with Oak Leaves, Swords and Diamonds (Ritterkreuz des Eisernen Kreuzes mit Eichenlaub, Schwertern und Brillanten). At the end of 1944 the final grade, the Knight's Cross of the Iron Cross with Golden Oak Leaves, Swords, and Diamonds (Ritterkreuz des Eisernen Kreuzes mit goldenem Eichenlaub, Schwertern und Brillanten), based on the enactment Reichsgesetzblatt 1945 I S. 11 of 29 December 1944, became the final variant of the Knight's Cross authorized.

== Recipients ==
Knight's Cross of the Iron Cross (N)
Service	Number of presentations	Posthumous presentations
Heer	103	7
Kriegsmarine	3	0
Luftwaffe	34	0
Waffen-SS	5	1

The Oberkommando der Wehrmacht (Supreme Command of the Armed Forces) kept separate Knight's Cross lists for the Heer (Army), Kriegsmarine (Navy), Luftwaffe (Air Force) and Waffen-SS. Within each of these lists a unique sequential number was assigned to each recipient. The same numbering paradigm was applied to the higher grades of the Knight's Cross, one list per grade. Of the 145 awards made to servicemen whose last name starts with "N", nine were later awarded the Knight's Cross of the Iron Cross with Oak Leaves, four the Knight's Cross of the Iron Cross with Oak Leaves and Swords and one the Knight's Cross of the Iron Cross with Oak Leaves, Swords and Diamonds; eight presentations were made posthumously. Heer members received one-hundred-three of the medals, including the award given to Hitlerjunge Günther Nowak. A further three presentations were given to the Kriegsmarine, thirty-four to the Luftwaffe, and five to the Waffen-SS. The sequential numbers greater than 143 for the Knight's Cross of the Iron Cross with Oak Leaves and Swords are unofficial and were assigned by the Association of Knight's Cross Recipients (AKCR) and are therefore denoted in parentheses.

This along with the + (plus) indicates that a higher grade of Knight's Cross was awarded as well.
This along with the * (asterisk), indicates that the Knight's Cross was awarded posthumously.
This along with the ! (exclamation mark) indicates that author Walther-Peer Fellgiebel has expressed doubt regarding the veracity and formal correctness of the listing.
This along with the ? (question mark) indicates that Scherzer has expressed doubt regarding the veracity and formal correctness of the listing.

Name	Service	Rank	Role and unit (Note: For an explanation of the various naming schemes used by the Luftwaffe, Heer, Kriegsmarine and Waffen-SS refer to nomenclature used by the Wehrmacht and Waffen-SS.)	Date of award	Notes	Image
Heinz Nacke	Luftwaffe	Hauptmann	Staffelkapitän of the 6./Zerstörergeschwader 76	2 November 1940	—	—
Rudolf Nacke	Luftwaffe	Stabsfeldwebel	Pilot in the III./Kampfgeschwader 76	23 July 1941	—	—
Kurt Naderwitz	Heer	Oberleutnant	Chief of the 1./Panzergrenadier-Regiment 112	1 January 1944	—	—
Werner Nadolski	Luftwaffe	Oberleutnant	Chief of the 3./Flak-Regiment 61 (motorized)	31 December 1943	—	—
Wilhelm Nädele	Heer	Major	Commander of the II./Grenadier-Regiment 460	4 November 1943	—	—
Walter Näfe	Heer	Oberfeldwebel	Zugführer (platoon leader) in the 5./Grenadier-Regiment 232	4 October 1944	—	—
Alfred Nähring	Heer	Major	Leader of Panzergrenadier-Regiment 73	4 October 1944	—	—
Helmut Nagel	Heer	Oberfeldwebel	Zugführer (platoon leader) in the 2./Grenadier-Regiment-Gruppe 163 (Note: According to Scherzer as Zugführer (platoon leader) in the 2./Grenadier-Regiment-Gruppe 163 in Divisions-Gruppe 52.)	15 March 1944	—	—
Willy Nagel	Heer	Oberst	Commander of Grenadier-Regiment 131	12 June 1944	—	—
Georg Nagengast	Heer	Major	Commander of the II./Grenadier-Regiment 119 (motorized)	28 November 1943	—	—
Karl-Heinz Najock	Luftwaffe	Oberleutnant	Pilot and observer in the 1.(H)/Aufklärungs-Gruppe 5	28 April 1945	—	—
Bruno Namyslo	Heer	Oberfeldwebel	Zugführer (platoon leader) in the 6./Jäger-Regiment 49	4 May 1944	—	—
Werner Naseband	Heer	Hauptmann	Commander of the I./Grenadier-Regiment 451	28 January 1943	—	—
Walter Nass	Heer	Oberstleutnant	Commander of Grenadier-Regiment 937	30 September 1944	—	—
Oldwig von Natzmer	Heer	Oberst im Generalstab	Ia (operations officer) in the Panzergrenadier-Division "Großdeutschland"	4 September 1943	—	—
Herbert Nau	Kriegsmarine	Kapitänleutnant	Chief of the 10. Räumbootflottille	11 July 1944	—	—
Herbert Naue	Heer	Leutnant of the Reserves	Leader of the 2./Infanterie-Regiment 178	13 July 1940	—	—
Hans-Jörg Naumann	Heer	Hauptmann	Commander of Feldersatz-Bataillon 172 of the 72 Infanterie-Division (Note: According to Scherzer as commander of Feldersatz-Bataillon 172.)	12 November 1943*	Killed in action 13 October 1943	—
Helmut Naumann	Luftwaffe	Oberleutnant	Staffelkapitän of the 3./Sturzkampfgeschwader 3	22 June 1941 (Note: According to Scherzer on 24 June 1941.)	—	—
Horst Naumann	Heer	Unteroffizier	Geschützführer (gun layer) in the 3./Sturmgeschütz-Abteilung 184	4 January 1943	—	—
Johannes Naumann	Luftwaffe	Hauptmann	Gruppenkommandeur of the II./Jagdgeschwader 6	9 November 1944	—	—
Werner Nebe	Heer	Major	Commander of the I./Schützen-Regiment 59	14 December 1941	—	—
Peter Nebel	Heer	Oberleutnant	Chief of the 3./Sturmgeschütz-Abteilung 177	27 March 1942	—	—
Leonhard Nechansky	Heer	Oberleutnant of the Reserves	Chief of the 1./Grenadier-Regiment 131	20 January 1943*	Killed in action 4 December 1942	—
Hanns-Horst von Necker	Luftwaffe	Oberst	Commander of Fallschirm-Panzergrenadier-Regiment 2 "Hermann Göring"	24 June 1944	—	—
Walther Nehring+	Heer	Generalmajor	Commander of the 18. Panzer-Division	24 July 1941	Awarded 383rd Oak Leaves 8 February 1944; 124th Swords 22 January 1945	
Franz Neibecker	Heer	Oberst	Commander of Infanterie-Regiment 227	16 February 1942	—	—
Hans Neidhöfer	Heer	Hauptmann of the Reserves	Leader of the II./Grenadier-Regiment 712	26 December 1944	—	—
Ludwig Neigl	Heer	Feldwebel	Deputy Zugführer (platoon leader) in the Stabskompanie/schwere Panzer-Jäger-Abteilung 519	27 July 1944	—	—
Egon von Neindorff+	Heer	Generalmajor	Commander of the garrison at Tarnopol	4 April 1944	Awarded 457th Oak Leaves 17 April 1944	—
Dr. Walter Neise	Heer	Oberst of the Reserves	Commander of Armeewaffenschule of Panzer AOK 4	5 February 1945	—	—
Karl Neitzel	Kriegsmarine	Korvettenkapitän	Commander of U-510	27 March 1943	—	—
Walter Neitzel+	Heer	Hauptmann	Leader of the I./Grenadier-Regiment 409	2 June 1943	Awarded 576th Oak Leaves 5 September 1944	—
Herbert Nelke	Luftwaffe	Unteroffizier	Geschützführer (gun layer) in the 1./Flak-Regiment 23 (motorized) (Note: According to Scherzer as Geschützführer (gun layer) in the 4./Flak-Regiment 23.)	4 July 1940	—	
Heinrich Nelles	Heer	Feldwebel	Zugführer (platoon leader) in the 4./Grenadier-Regiment 698	10 September 1944	—	—
Ludwig Nemecek	Luftwaffe	Oberleutnant	Observer in the 3.(F)/Aufklärungs-Gruppe 122 (Note: According to Scherzer as observer in the Aufklärungsstaffel 3.(F)/122.)	19 September 1942	—	—
Willi Nemitz	Luftwaffe	Oberfeldwebel	Pilot in the 4./Jagdgeschwader 52 (Note: According to Scherzer as pilot in the 5./Jagdgeschwader 52.)	24 March 1943	—	—
Gerhart Nemnich	Heer	Hauptmann	Commander of Panzer-Pionier-Bataillon 19	15 July 1943	—	—
Günther Nentwig	Heer	Major	Commander of the I./Artillerie-Regiment 295	21 January 1942	—	—
Karl Nestle	Heer	Feldwebel	Zugführer (platoon leader) in the 7./Grenadier-Regiment 35 (motorized)	17 August 1943*	Killed in action 30 July 1943	—
Helmut Neuber	Heer	Stabsfeldwebel	Zugführer (platoon leader) in the 2./Grenadier-Regiment 176	25 January 1945	—	—
Frank Neubert	Luftwaffe	Oberleutnant	Staffelkapitän of the 2./Sturzkampfgeschwader 2 "Immelmann"	22 June 1941 (Note: According to Scherzer on 24 June 1941.)	—	—
Karl Neubert	Heer	Major	Commander of Ski-Jäger-Bataillon 1 (Note: According to Scherzer as commander of schweres Ski-Bataillon 1.)	4 October 1944	—	—
Rudolf Neubert+	Heer	Hauptmann	Commander of the II./Grenadier-Regiment 32	29 February 1944	Awarded 817th Oak Leaves 5 April 1945	—
Rudolf Neubrandt	Heer	Leutnant of the Reserves	Zugführer (platoon leader) in Panzer-Aufklärungs-Abteilung 37	29 September 1940	—	—
Walther Neuer	Heer	Major	Leader of a Kampfgruppe in Ploiești (Romania) (Note: According to Scherzer as leader of a Kampfgruppe from emergency units composed of all Wehrmacht branches in Ploiești/Romania.)	5 November 1944	—	—
Hermann Neuerburg	Heer	Oberleutnant of the Reserves	Leader of Divisions-Füsilier-Bataillon (A.A.) 121	8 February 1944	—	—
Ernst Neufeld	Heer	Oberfeldwebel	Zugführer (platoon leader) in the 2./Kradschützen-Bataillon 40 (Note: According to Scherzer as Zugführer (platoon leader) in the 2./Kradschützen-Abteilung 4.)	3 January 1943	—	—
Karl Neufellner	Heer	Oberst	Commander of Artillerie-Regiment 86	6 April 1944	—	—
Georg Neuffer	Luftwaffe	Generalmajor	Commander of the 20. Flak-Division (motorized) (Note: According to Scherzer as commander of the 20. Flak-Division.)	1 August 1943	—	
Georg von Neufville	Heer	Oberst zur Verwendung (for disposition)	Commander of Infanterie-Regiment 195	22 September 1941	—	—
[Dr.]Walter Neugebauer (Note: The brackets around the doctor title [Dr.] denotes that the academic title was attained after the Knight's Cross of the Iron Cross was awarded.)	Heer	Oberleutnant	Leader of the 12./Artillerie-Regiment 12	16 October 1944	—	—
Josef Neuhierl	Heer	Unteroffizier	Group leader of the 8./Grenadier-Regiment 3	17 March 1945	—	—
Hermann Neuhoff	Luftwaffe	Leutnant	Staffelführer in the III./Jagdgeschwader 53 (Note: According to Scherzer on 19 June 1942 as Staffelführer of the 7./Jagdgeschwader 53.)	16 June 1942	—	—
Karl Neuhoff	Luftwaffe	Oberfeldwebel	Shock troops leader in the 6./Fallschirmjäger-Regiment 3	9 June 1944	—	—
Ferdinand Neuling	Heer	Generalleutnant	Commander of the 239. Infanterie-Division	28 February 1942	—	—
Eggert Neumann	Waffen-SS	SS-Sturmbannführer of the Reserves	Commander of SS-Gebirgs-Aufklärungs-Abteilung 7 "Prinz Eugen" (Note: According to Scherzer as commander of SS-Gebirgs-Aufklärungs-Abteilung 7.)	3 November 1944	—	—
Ernst Neumann	Heer	Hauptmann (Note: According to Scherzer as Hauptmann of the Reserves.)	Leader of Festungs-Infanterie-Bataillon XII./999	20 April 1945	—	—
Friedrich-Wilhelm Neumann	Heer	Generalleutnant	Commander of the 712. Infanterie-Division	16 October 1944	—	—
Dr. med. Heinrich Neumann (Note: In German a Doctor of Medicine is abbreviated as Dr. med. (Doctor medicinae).)	Luftwaffe	Oberstabsarzt	Troop doctor of the Fallschirmjäger-Sturm-Regiment (Note: According to Scherzer as regimental doctor of Luftlande-Sturm-Regiment 1 at the same time leader of the I./ Luftlande-Sturm-Regiment 1.)	21 August 1941	—	
Helmut Neumann	Luftwaffe	Leutnant	Staffelführer of the 14./Jagdgeschwader 5	12 March 1945	—	—
Joachim Neumann	Heer	Major	Commander of the I./Panzer-Artillerie-Regiment 103	23 February 1944	—	—
Johannes Neumann	Heer	Hauptmann of the Reserves	Chief of the 8./Grenadier-Regiment 852	17 September 1944	—	—
Jürgen Neumann	Heer	Oberleutnant	Chief of the 1./Infanterie-Regiment 5 (motorized) (Note: According to Scherzer as chief of the 1./Schüzen-Regiment 5.)	1 November 1941	—	—
Klaus Neumann	Luftwaffe	Feldwebel	Pilot in the 16./Jagdgeschwader 3 "Udet" (Note: According to Scherzer on 25 November 1944 as pilot in the 16.(Sturm)/Jagdgeschwader 3 "Udet".)	9 December 1944	—	—
Otto-Karl Neumann	Heer	Leutnant (Note: According to Scherzer as Leutnant of the Reserves.)	Leader of the 6./Artillerie-Regiment 126	5 April 1945*	Killed in action 22 February 1945	—
Rudolf Neumann	Luftwaffe	Hauptmann	Staffelkapitän of the 2./Schlachtgeschwader 1	17 April 1945	—	—
Werner Neumann	Heer	Oberst	Commander of Grenadier-Regiment 121	5 September 1944	—	—
Walter Neumann-Silkow	Heer	Oberst	Commander of the 8. Schützen-Brigade	5 August 1940	—	—
Hans Neumayer	Heer	Oberleutnant of the Reserves	Chief of the 12.(MG)/Grenadier-Regiment 282 (Note: According to Scherzer as chief of the 12./Grenadier-Regiment 282.)	20 January 1944	—	—
Lorenz Neumayr	Heer	Gefreiter	Machine gunner in the 1./Grenadier-Regiment 755	14 January 1945	—	—
Hans Neumeier	Heer	Feldwebel	Zugführer (platoon leader) in the 2./Panzergrenadier-Regiment 64	6 April 1944	—	—
Karl Neumeister	Heer	Oberst	Commander of Panzergrenadier-Regiment 1	4 June 1944	—	—
Werner Neumeyer	Heer	Leutnant	Zugführer (platoon leader) in the I./Panzergrenadier-Regiment 26	23 October 1944	—	—
Ernst Neumüller	Heer	Oberleutnant	Leader of the 14.(Panzerjäger)/Divisions-Kampfgruppe 216 (Note: According to Scherzer as leader of the 14./Divisions-Gruppe 216.)	5 October 1944	—	—
Fritz Neumüller	Luftwaffe	Leutnant	Pilot and adjutand in the II./Sturzkampfgeschwader 77	4 May 1944	—	—
Lothar Neunhoeffer	Heer	Major	Commander of Divisions-Füsilier-Bataillon (A.A.) 292	3 January 1944	—	—
Kurt Nibbe	Heer	Oberfähnrich	Zugführer (platoon leader) in the 1./Pionier-Bataillon 20	17 March 1945	—	—
Heinrich Nickel+	Heer	Oberstleutnant	Commander of the III./Infanterie-Regiment 26	16 June 1940	Awarded 543rd Oak Leaves 8 August 1944	—
Karl Nicolussi-Leck	Waffen-SS	SS-Obersturmführer	Chief of the 8./SS-Panzer-Regiment 5 "Wiking" (Note: According to Scherzer as chief of the 8./SS-Panzer-Regiment 5.)	9 April 1944	—	—
Horst Niederländer+	Heer	Hauptmann	Leader of the I./Grenadier-Regiment 686	10 February 1943	Awarded 491st Oak Leaves 9 June 1944	—
Heinrich Niedermeier	Heer	Leutnant of the Reserves	Zugführer (platoon leader) in the 5./Gebirgsjäger-Bataillon 94	11 December 1943*	Died of wounds 7 November 1943	—
Hans Niedzwetzki	Heer	Feldwebel	Zugführer (platoon leader) of the 2./Grenadier-Regiment 23	22 August 1943	—	—
Roman Niedzwitzki	Heer	Unteroffizier of the Reserves (Note: According to Scherzer as Unteroffizier.)	Vorgeschobener Beobachter (forward observer) in the 12./Artillerie-Regiment 290	28 April 1945	—	—
Karl Niegsch	Heer	Major of the Reserves	Commander of the I./Grenadier-Regiment 223 (Note: According to Scherzer as commander of the I./Grenadier-Regiment 223 (fortress La Rochelle).)	30 April 1945	—	—
Hermann Niehoff+	Heer	Generalleutnant	Commander of the 371. Infanterie-Division	15 June 1944	Awarded 764th Oak Leaves 5 March 1945 (147th) Swords 26 April 1945? (Note: No evidence of the award can be found in the German Federal Archives. The Association of Knight's Cross Recipients (AKCR) only assumes that the Swords were awarded. According to Hermann Niehoff's testimony he was nominated by Gauleiter Karl Hanke. The date and sequential number "147" were assigned by the AKCR. Niehoff was member of the AKCR.)	—
[Dr.] Heinz Niehuus	Luftwaffe	Hauptmann	Gruppenkommandeur of the I./Schlachtgeschwader 77	17 April 1945	—	—
Albert Nielsen	Heer	Oberwachtmeister	Zugführer (platoon leader) in the 3./Divisions-Füsilier-Bataillon 58 (Note: According to Scherzer as Zugführer (platoon leader) in the 3./Divisions-Füsilier-Bataillon (A.A.) 58.)	17 March 1945	—	—
Horst Niemack+	Heer	Rittmeister	Commander of Aufklärungs-Abteilung 5	13 July 1940	Awarded 30th Oak Leaves 10 August 1941; 69th Swords 4 June 1944	
August Niemann	Heer	Feldwebel	Zugführer (platoon leader) in the 3./Pionier-Bataillon 112	4 May 1944	—	—
Eduard Niemann	Heer	Oberst of the Reserves	Commander of Artillerie-Regiment 212	29 February 1944	—	—
Heinrich Niemann	Heer	Leutnant of the Reserves	Leader of the 3./Pionier-Bataillon 196	30 April 1943	—	—
Willi Niemann	Heer	Unteroffizier	Geschützführer (gun layer) in the 9./Artillerie-Regiment 31	26 December 1944	—	—
Gerhard Niemeck	Heer	Feldwebel	Zugführer (platoon leader) in the 8./Panzer-Regiment 31	14 March 1943	—	—
Ernst Niemeier	Heer	Feldwebel	Zugführer (platoon leader) in the II./Grenadier-Regiment 431	18 February 1945	—	—
Josef Niemietz	Heer	Hauptfeldwebel	Zugführer (platoon leader) in the Stab 3.(Fla)/Panzer-Jäger-Abteilung 332	24 July 1943	—	
Peter Nießen	Heer	Leutnant	Aide-de-camp in Grenadier-Regiment 979	9 January 1945	—	—
Georg Nietert	Heer	Unteroffizier	Geschützführer (gun layer) in the 14./Grenadier-Regiment 994	10 February 1945	—	—
Heinrich Nietsche	Heer	Hauptmann	Commander of the III./Infanterie-Regiment 105	13 June 1941	—	—
Wilhelm Niggemeyer+	Heer	Leutnant of the Reserves	Leader of the 2./Pionier-Bataillon 26	18 September 1942	Awarded 241st Oak Leaves 17 May 1943	—
Hans Nilshon	Heer	Major	Commander of the III./Artillerie-Regiment 26	28 March 1945	—	—
Erhard Nippa	Luftwaffe	Oberleutnant	Pilot in the 15./Schnellkampfgeschwader 10	26 March 1944	—	—
Kurt Nippes	Heer	Leutnant of the Reserves	Zugführer (platoon leader) in the 1./Sturmgeschütz-Abteilung 276	29 January 1944*	Killed in action 10 December 1943	—
Alfred Nitsch	Luftwaffe	Oberfeldwebel	Pilot in the 2.(F)/Aufklärungs-Gruppe 123 (Note: According to Scherzer as pilot in the Aufklärungsstaffel 2.(F)/123.)	21 June 1943	—	—
Hans-Joachim Nitsch	Heer	Leutnant	Zugführer (platoon leader) in the Panzer-Abteilung 118 (Note: According to Scherzer as Zugführer (platoon leader) in the 2./Panzer-Abteilung 118.)	23 March 1945	—	—
Hermann Nitsch	Heer	Obergefreiter	Vorgeschobener Beobachter (forward observer) and radio/wireless operator in the 6./Artillerie-Regiment 11	17 April 1945	—	—
Martin Nitsch	Heer	Oberleutnant	Leader of the 6./Grenadier-Regiment 417	30 September 1944*	Killed in action 19 September 1944	—
Robert Nittler	Heer	Leutnant (Note: According to Scherzer as Leutnant of the Reserves.)	Leader of the 3./Grenadier-Regiment 212	20 January 1943	—	—
Karl Noack	Heer	Oberleutnant	Chief of the 1.(Reiter)/Divisions-Aufklärungs-Abteilung 168 (Note: According to Scherzer as chief of the Reiter-Schwadron 168.)	24 April 1943	—	—
Karl-Heinz Noak+	Heer	Leutnant	Zugführer (platoon leader) of the 2./Panzer-Jäger-Abteilung 46	5 August 1940	Awarded 63rd Oak Leaves 16 January 1942	—
Ernst Nobis+	Heer	Hauptmann	Commander of the II./Infanterie-Regiment 204	21 January 1942	Awarded 151st Oak Leaves 5 December 1942	—
Klaus Nocken	Luftwaffe	Major	Gruppenkommandeur of the III./Kampfgeschwader 26	29 October 1943	—	—
Kurt Nöbel	Heer	Obergefreiter	Group leader in the 1.(Reiter)/Aufklärungs-Abteilung 7 (Note: According to Scherzer as group leader in the 1./Aufklärungs-Abteilung 7.)	30 November 1943	—	—
Friedrich-Karl Nökel	Heer	Hauptmann of the Reserves	Leader of the II./Panzer-Regiment 31	17 September 1944	—	—
Ferdinand Noeldechen	Heer	Generalmajor	Commander of the 96. Infanterie-Division	8 June 1943	—	—
Cornelius Noëll	Luftwaffe	Oberleutnant	Pilot in the 4.(F)/Aufklärungs-Gruppe des OB der Luftwaffe	22 October 1941	—	—
Herbert Nölter	Luftwaffe	Hauptmann	Staffelkapitän of the 2./Kampfgeschwader 3 "Lützow"	5 September 1944	—	—
Klaus Nöske	Luftwaffe	Hauptmann	Staffelkapitän of the 1./Kampfgeschwader 4 "General Wever"	16 May 1941	—	—
Karl Nohr? (Note: Karl Nohr's nomination by the troop was received by the Heerespersonalamt (HPA—Army Staff Office) on 3 April 1945. The HPA created a nomination request with the number 5018 and forwarded this request on 7 April. This was also noted on the file card. No further remarks or comments have been noted. According to the Association of Knight's Cross Recipients (AKCR) the presentation was made in accordance with the Dönitz-decree. This is illegal according to the Deutsche Dienststelle (WASt) and lacks legal justification. The presentation date was assigned by Walther-Peer Fellgiebel.)	Heer	Unteroffizier	Group leader in the Stabskompanie/Grenadier-Regiment 453	9 May 1945	—	—
Wilhelm Noller	Luftwaffe	Fahnenjunker-Feldwebel	Pilot in the 2./Schlachtgeschwader 2 "Immelmann" (Note: According to Scherzer as pilot in the I./Schlachtgeschwader 2 "Immelmann".)	6 April 1944	—	—
Harro Nolte	Heer	Leutnant of the Reserves	Leader of the 4./Grenadier-Regiment 507	4 October 1944	—	—
Kurt Nolte	Heer	Hauptmann of the Reserves	Commander of the II./Infanterie-Regiment 213	6 September 1942	—	—
Walter Nolte	Heer	Hauptmann	Commander of the II./Grenadier-Regiment "Jütland" (Note: According to Scherzer as commander of the II./Grenadier-Regiment "Jütland" (32. Infanterie-Division).)	5 April 1945	—	—
Karl-Gottfried Nordmann+	Luftwaffe	Oberleutnant	Staffelkapitän of the 12./Jagdgeschwader 51	1 August 1941	Awarded 35th Oak Leaves 16 September 1941	
Theodor Nordmann+	Luftwaffe	Leutnant	Pilot in the 8./Sturzkampfgeschwader 1	17 September 1941	Awarded 214th Oak Leaves 17 March 1943; 98th Swords 17 September 1944 (Note: According to Scherzer the 214th Oak Leaves were awarded on 16 March 1943.)	—
Otto Nordt	Kriegsmarine	Kapitänleutnant	Chief of the 14. Räumbootflottille	6 September 1944	—	—
Helmut Normann	Heer	Oberleutnant of the Reserves	Leader of the 1./Jäger-Regiment 83	23 February 1944	—	—
Jakob Norz	Luftwaffe	Oberfeldwebel	Pilot in the 6./Jagdgeschwader 5 (Note: According to Scherzer as pilot in the III./Jagdgeschwader 5.)	26 March 1944	—	—
Rainer Nossek	Luftwaffe	Fahnenjunker-Feldwebel	Pilot in the 10.(Panzer)/Schlachtgeschwader 3	29 October 1944	—	—
Gustav-Adolf von Nostitz-Wallwitz	Heer	Oberst	Commander of Panzer-Artillerie-Regiment 89	12 June 1944	—	—
Jürgen von Nottbeck	Heer	Hauptmann	Commander of the I./Grenadier-Regiment 94	21 January 1945	—	—
Friedrich-Wilhelm von Notz	Heer	Oberstleutnant	Commander of Grenadier-Regiment 1233	23 March 1945	—	—
Alfred Nowak	Waffen-SS	SS-Oberscharführer of the Reserves	Zugführer (platoon leader) of the 3./SS-Reiter-Regiment 1 "Florian Geyer" (Note: According to Scherzer as Zugführer (platoon leader) of the 3./SS-Reiter-Regiment 1.)	1 November 1943*	Killed in action 13 September 1943	—
Günther Nowak! (Note: Günther Nowak was a non existing person who became a de jure recipient of Knight's Cross of the Iron Cross.)	Hitlerjugend	Hitlerjunge	Hitlerjunge in Hindenburg (Upper Silesia)	14 February 1945	—	—
Paul Nowak	Heer	Leutnant of the Reserves	Leader of the 1./Grenadier-Regiment 273	10 September 1944	—	—
Heinz Nowotnik	Waffen-SS	SS-Untersturmführer of the Reserves	Leader of the 14.(MG)/SS-Panzergrenadier-Regiment 1 "Leibstandarte SS Adolf Hitler" (Note: According to Scherzer as leader of the 14./SS-Panzergrenadier-Regiment 1 "Leibstandarte SS Adolf Hitler".)	14 May 1944	—	—
Karl Nowotnik	Heer	Sanitätsfeldwebel	In the Stab/Divisions-Füsilier-Bataillon (A.A.) 212	15 March 1944	—	—
Walter Nowotny+	Luftwaffe	Leutnant	Pilot in the 9./Jagdgeschwader 54 (Note: According to Scherzer as pilot in the 3./Jagdgeschwader 54.)	4 September 1942	Awarded 293rd Oak Leaves 4 September 1943; 37th Swords 22 September 1943; 8th Diamonds 19 October 1943	
Gregor Nowowieski	Heer	Hauptmann	Commander of the II./Grenadier-Regiment 695	28 December 1944	—	—
Alfred Nuckelt	Heer	Major	Commander in the Divisions-Füsilier-Bataillon 218	10 September 1944	—	—
Erich Nürnberger	Heer	Feldwebel	Zugführer (platoon leader) in the 12./Infanterie-Regiment 410	4 December 1942	—	—
Carlos Nugent	Luftwaffe	Fahnenjunker-Oberfeldwebel	Radio operator in the I./Nachtjagdgeschwader 2	17 April 1945	—	—
Harald Nugiseks	Waffen-SS	Waffen-Unterscharführer (Note: According to Scherzer as Waffen-Untersturmführer.)	Zugführer (platoon leader) in the 1./SS-Freiwilligen-Grenadier-Regiment 46 (estn. Nr. 2)	9 April 1944	—	
Heinrich Nuhn? (Note: Heinrich Nuhn's nomination by the troop was received by the Heerespersonalamt (HPA—Army Staff Office) on 28 April 1945 as teleprinter message. The HPA did not create a nomination request nor is Nuhn listed in the book of "Verliehene Ritterkreuze" (Awarded Knight Crosses). No further remarks or comments have been noted. The registry of rejected or deferred nominations contains his file card. According to the Association of Knight's Cross Recipients (AKCR) the presentation was made in accordance with the Dönitz-decree. This is illegal according to the Deutsche Dienststelle (WASt) and lacks legal justification. The presentation date was assigned by Walther-Peer Fellgiebel.)	Heer	Hauptmann	Commander of Panzer-Pionier-Bataillon in the Führer-Grenadier-Division	9 April 1945	—	—
Hans Nuhr? (Note: The addendum of Walther-Peer Fellgiebel's book, Die Träger des Ritterkreuzes des Eisernen Kreuzes 1939–1945 (in German), contains a note indicating that Hans Nuhr needs to be struck from the list.)	Luftwaffe	Oberfeldwebel	Pilot in Schnellkampfgeschwader 210	22 March 1944	—	—
