= List of aerial victories claimed by Hans Philipp =

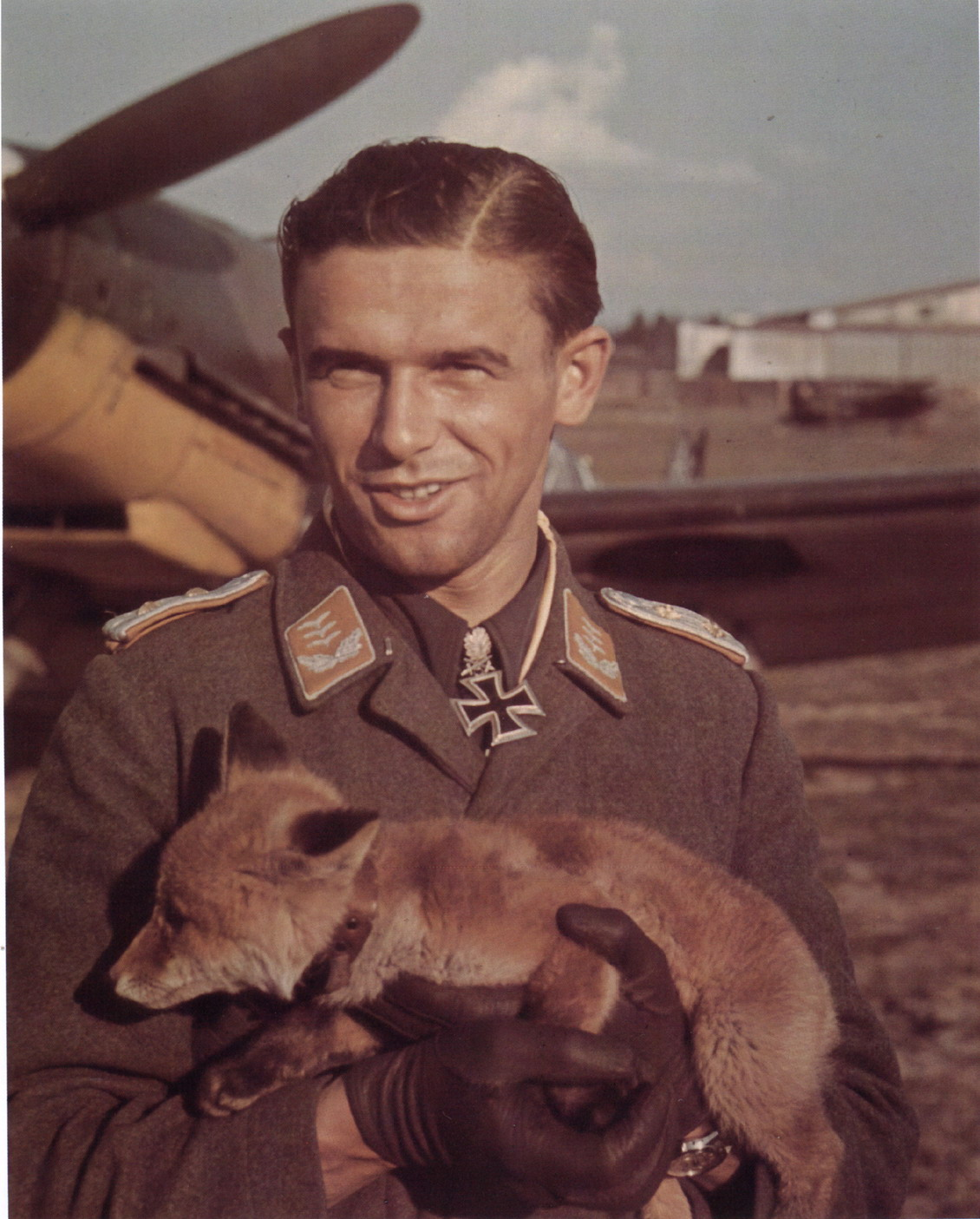
Philipp as a Hauptmann

Hans Philipp (17 March 1917 – 8 October 1943) was a German Luftwaffe fighter ace during World War II. A flying ace or fighter ace is a military aviator credited with shooting down five or more enemy aircraft during aerial combat. He is credited with 206 enemy aircraft shot down in over 500 combat missions. The majority of his victories were claimed over the Eastern Front, with 29 claims over the Western Front.

== List of aerial victories claimed ==
According to US historian David T. Zabecki, Philipp was credited with 206 aerial victories. Spick also lists him with the same number of aerial victories claimed in an unknown number of combat missions. Mathews and Foreman, authors of Luftwaffe Aces — Biographies and Victory Claims, researched the German Federal Archives and found records for 193 aerial victory claims, plus nine further unconfirmed claims. This figure includes 171 claims on the Eastern Front, two during the Balkan Campaign, and 20 claims on the Western Front, including one four-engined bomber. Prien, Stemmer, Rodeike and Bock list 206 aerial victory claims plus one further unconfirmed claim. This number includes up to two further unconfirmed claims on 31 March 1942.

Victory claims were logged to a map-reference (PQ = Planquadrat), for example "PQ 00281". The Luftwaffe grid map (Jägermeldenetz) covered all of Europe, western Russia and North Africa and was composed of rectangles measuring 15 minutes of latitude by 30 minutes of longitude, an area of about 360 square miles (930 km^{2}). These sectors were then subdivided into 36 smaller units to give a location area 3 km × 4 km (1.9 mi × 2.5 mi) in size.

♠ (Ace of spades) indicates those aerial victories which made Philipp an "ace-in-a-day", a term which designates a fighter pilot who has shot down five or more airplanes in a single day.
– (dash) indicates unconfirmed aerial victory claims for which Philipp did not receive credit.
! (exclamation mark) indicates those aerial victories listed by Prien, Stemmer, Rodeike and Bock.
# (hash mark) indicates those aerial victories listed by Mathews and Foreman.
? (question mark) indicates missing aerial victories or inconsistencies in numbering sequence.

Claim!	Claim#	Date	Time	Type	Location	Claim!	Claim#	Date	Time	Type	Location
– 1. Staffel of Jagdgeschwader 76 –
1	1	5 September 1939	14:15	PZL P.24	7 km (4.3 mi) south of Radomsko	7	4	3 June 1940	15:25	Curtiss	west of Épernay
? (Note: According to Prien, Stemmer, Rodeike and Bock, Philipp claimed three additional aerial victories, including a Souitfire on 24 May and a Bloch MB.151 on 8 June 1940.)	2	18 May 1940	16:25	Curtiss	west of Rethel	8	5	7 June 1940	20:50	Spitfire	south of Dieppe
6	3	3 June 1940	15:20	Curtiss	west of Épernay						
– 4. Staffel of Jagdgeschwader 54 –
9	—	30 August 1940	—	Hurricane		46♠	36	30 July 1941	07:25	I-16	
10	—	1 September 1940	—	Hurricane		47♠	37	30 July 1941	11:10	I-16	
11	6	5 September 1940	16:20	Spitfire	Thames Estuary	48♠	38	30 July 1941	16:35	I-16	
12	7	27 September 1940	10:20	Hurricane	west of London	49♠	39	30 July 1941	16:45	I-18 (MiG-1)	
13	—	27 September 1940	—	Spitfire		—	—	30 July 1941	—	I-16	
14	—	27 September 1940	—	unknown		50	40	10 August 1941	10:20	I-18 (MiG-1)	
15	8	27 September 1940	16:18	Spitfire	Hastings	51	41	10 August 1941	16:00	I-16	
16	9	13 October 1940	14:02	Hurricane		52	42	11 August 1941	13:25	I-16	
17	10	13 October 1940	14:02	Hurricane	Dungeness-Tonbridge	53	43	11 August 1941	15:45	I-16	
18	11	13 October 1940	14:03	Hurricane		54♠	44	13 August 1941	09:20	I-18 (MiG-1)	
19	12	20 October 1940	11:05	Hurricane		55♠	45	13 August 1941	09:25	I-18 (MiG-1)	
20	—	20 October 1940	—	Hurricane		56♠	46	13 August 1941	13:55	I-18 (MiG-1)	
21	13	30 October 1940	17:02	Spitfire	Dungeness	57♠	47	13 August 1941	15:55	I-16	
22	—	2 November 1940	—	Hurricane	Dungeness	58♠	48	13 August 1941	16:00	I-16	
23	14	14 November 1940	12:30	Hurricane	Canterbury	59	49	18 August 1941	11:00	I-18 (MiG-1)	
24	15	7 April 1941	17:55	Bf 109	south of Neusatz	60	50	18 August 1941	11:05	I-18 (MiG-1)	
25	16	7 April 1941	18:03	Bf 109	south of Neusatz	61	51	19 August 1941	12:50	I-16	
26	17	22 June 1941	16:45	SB-2	northwest of Kowno	62	52	19 August 1941	17:45	I-16	
27	18	27 June 1941	19:45	SB-2		63	53	19 August 1941	17:55	I-18 (MiG-1)	
28	19	30 June 1941	11:45	DB-3		64	54	21 August 1941	11:45	I-18 (MiG-1)	
29	20	30 June 1941	15:12	DB-3		65	55	23 August 1941	15:25	I-16	
30	21	30 June 1941	15:20	DB-3		66	56	23 August 1941	15:35	I-16	
31	22	2 July 1941	08:32	I-16		67	57	2 September 1941	14:35	I-16	
32	23	2 July 1941	08:32	I-18 (MiG-1)		68	58	14 September 1941	14:15	I-18 (MiG-1)	
33	24	2 July 1941	20:13	SB-2		69	59	14 September 1941	14:20	I-18 (MiG-1)	
34	25	6 July 1941	18:40	SB-2		70	60	2 October 1941	06:35	I-18 (MiG-1)	
35	26	8 July 1941	03:00	I-15	Ostrov	71	61	2 October 1941	06:40	I-18 (MiG-1)	
36	27	8 July 1941	03:12	I-15	Ostrov	72	62	7 October 1941	15:40	I-18 (MiG-1)	
37	28	11 July 1941	17:10	SB-2		73	63	9 October 1941	08:20	Seal	
38	29	12 July 1941	20:30	I-15	Lake Pjesna/Porkhov	74	64	6 February 1942	14:00	R-5	southeast of Malaya Vishera
39	30	18 July 1941	09:00	I-18 (MiG-1)		75	65	6 February 1942	14:08	I-18 (Note: According to Mathews and Foreman claimed as a Polikarpov R-5.)	southeast of Malaya Vishera
40	—	18 July 1941	—	I-18 (MiG-1)		76	66	16 February 1942	10:30	I-18 (MiG-1)	
41	31	18 July 1941	14:55	I-18 (MiG-1)		77	67	16 February 1942	10:35	I-18 (MiG-1)	
42	32	20 July 1941	14:30	I-18 (MiG-1)		78	68	16 February 1942	10:42	I-18 (MiG-1)	
43	33	21 July 1941	04:05	I-18 (MiG-1)		79	69	17 February 1942	13:40	I-18 (MiG-1)	
44	34	22 July 1941	18:00	I-16		80	70	19 February 1942	10:10	I-18 (MiG-1)	
45♠	35	30 July 1941	07:20	I-16		81	71	22 February 1942	14:30	I-18 (MiG-1)	
– Stab I. Staffel of Jagdgeschwader 54 –
82	72	23 February 1942	09:05	P-40		142♠	132	12 January 1943	11:20	I-16	PQ 00281; 20 km (12 mi) west of Mga
83	73	26 February 1942	12:00	P-40		143♠	133	12 January 1943	14:05 (Note: According to Mathews and Foreman claimed at 14:01.)	Pe-2	PQ 10154 southeast of Schlüsselburg
84	74	27 February 1942	08:40	I-18 (MiG-1)		144	134	13 January 1943	13:58	LaGG-3	PQ 00264; 10 km (6.2 mi) southwest of Schlüsselburg
85	75	27 February 1942	08:47	I-18 (MiG-1)		145	135	13 January 1943	14:03	LaGG-3	PQ 10244; 25 km (16 mi) east-southeast of Schlüsselburg
86	76	28 February 1942	09:36	I-18 (MiG-1)		146♠	136	14 January 1943	09:03	Il-2	PQ 10314; 45 km (28 mi) west of Volkhov
87	77	12 March 1942	09:55	I-18 (MiG-1)		147♠	137	14 January 1943	09:15 (Note: According to Mathews and Foreman claimed at 09:05.)	Il-2	PQ 10213; 45 km (28 mi) west of Volkhov
88	78	12 March 1942	09:59	I-18 (MiG-1)		148♠	138	14 January 1943	11:35 (Note: According to Mathews and Foreman claimed at 11:25.)	Hurricane	PQ 00254; 15 km (9.3 mi) west-southwest of Schlüsselburg
89	79	15 March 1942	16:34	I-18 (MiG-1)		149♠	139	14 January 1943	11:36 (Note: According to Mathews and Foreman claimed at 11:28.)	Hurricane	PQ 00252; 15 km (9.3 mi) west-southwest of Schlüsselburg
90	—	17 March 1942	—	unknown		150♠	140	14 January 1943	11:55	LaGG-3	PQ 00283; 20 km (12 mi) west of Mga
91	80	18 March 1942	13:08	I-18 (MiG-1)		151	141	15 January 1943	13:03	Il-2	PQ 00432; 10 km (6.2 mi) southwest of Mga
92	81	22 March 1942	10:45	I-18 (MiG-1)		152	142	15 January 1943	13:05 (Note: According to Mathews and Foreman claimed at 13:06.)	Il-2	PQ 00431; 10 km (6.2 mi) southwest of Mga
93	82	22 March 1942	16:25	I-18 (MiG-1)		153	143	22 January 1943	13:02	LaGG-3	PQ 10414; 25 km (16 mi) east-southeast of Mga
94	83	28 March 1942	09:10	I-18 (MiG-1)		154	144	22 January 1943	13:10	Il-2	PQ 10344; 20 km (12 mi) east-southeast of Mga
95	84	29 March 1942	08:45	I-18 (MiG-1)		155	145	22 January 1943	13:12	Il-2	PQ 10152 southeast of Schlüsselburg
96	85	29 March 1942	11:15	I-18 (MiG-1)		156♠		23 January 1943	11:10	LaGG-3	PQ 10182
97	86	29 March 1942	11:19	I-18 (MiG-1)		157♠		23 January 1943	11:15	R-5	PQ 00263
98	87	29 March 1942	11:25	I-18 (MiG-1)		158♠	146	23 January 1943	13:02	LaGG-3	PQ 10163 southeast of Schlüsselburg
99? (Note: Although unconfirmed, according to Prien, Stemmer, Rodeike and Bock, Philipp claimed his 99th and 100th aerial victory on 31 March 1942. The authors also state that following his 100th victory, Philipp was temporarily banned from flying combat missions. This ban was lifted again in late May 1942. Nevertheless, the chronological numbering sequence is inconsistent. Philipps aerial victory claimed on 30 May 1942 is presented as his 98th confirmed claim.)	—	31 March 1942	—	P-40		159♠	147	23 January 1943	13:08	La-5	PQ 10191 east of Mga
100?	—	31 March 1942	—	P-40		160♠	148	23 January 1943	13:12	LaGG-3	PQ 10152 southeast of Schlüsselburg
98?	88	30 May 1942	16:17	MiG-3		161♠	149	23 January 1943	13:14	LaGG-3	PQ 10151 southeast of Schlüsselburg
99	89	6 June 1942	17:25	P-40		162	150	24 January 1943	10:56	I-153	PQ 10143 south of Schlüsselburg
100	90	6 June 1942	17:26	P-40		163	151	11 February 1943	09:14	LaGG-3	PQ 36 Ost 00274; 15 km (9.3 mi) northeast of Pushkin
101	91	11 June 1942	20:25	Yak-1		164	152	14 February 1943	14:30	Il-2	PQ 36 Ost 00462; 10 km (6.2 mi) north of Tosno
102	92	12 June 1942	20:10	MiG-3		165	153	14 February 1943	14:35	Il-2	PQ 36 Ost 00492; 10 km (6.2 mi) west of Mga
103	93	15 June 1942	20:01	LaGG-3		166	154	19 February 1943	12:10	LaGG-3	PQ 36 Ost 10391; 15 km (9.3 mi) northeast of Lyuban
104	94	15 June 1942	20:02	LaGG-3		167	155	19 February 1943	12:15	LaGG-3	PQ 36 Ost 10394; 15 km (9.3 mi) northeast of Lyuban
105	95	26 June 1942	09:37	Il-2		168	156	21 February 1943	08:45	LaGG-3	PQ 36 Ost 00411; 10 km (6.2 mi) east of Pushkin
106	96	26 June 1942	09:44	LaGG-3		169	157	21 February 1943	09:06	P-39	PQ 36 Ost 10534; 10 km (6.2 mi) northeast of Lyuban
107	97	26 June 1942	16:28	LaGG-3		170	158	22 February 1943	15:08	Il-2	PQ 36 Ost 10153 southeast of Schlüsselburg
108	98	11 July 1942	19:48	P-40		171	159	22 February 1943	15:23	Il-2	PQ 36 Ost 10144 south of Schlüsselburg
109	99	2 August 1942	14:26	LaGG-3	PQ 00164; 10 km (6.2 mi) southeast of Leningrad	172♠	160	23 February 1943	08:40	LaGG-3	PQ 36 Ost 00412; 10 km (6.2 mi) east of Pushkin
110	100	2 August 1942	14:31	LaGG-3	PQ 00191; 10 km (6.2 mi) north of Pushkin	173♠	161	23 February 1943	08:50	Yak-1	PQ 36 Ost 00512; 10 km (6.2 mi) north of Lyuban
111	101	3 November 1942	11:45	R-5	PQ 1013	174♠	162	23 February 1943	08:53	Yak-1	PQ 36 Ost 10392; 15 km (9.3 mi) northeast of Lyuban
112	102	7 November 1942	07:49	P-40	PQ 11853; 40 km (25 mi) northwest of Volkhov	175♠	163	23 February 1943	08:55	Yak-1	PQ 36 Ost 10363; 25 km (16 mi) southeast of Mga
113	103	9 November 1942	07:08	Hurricane	PQ 11752; Lake Ladoga	176♠	164	23 February 1943	08:59	Yak-1	PQ 36 Ost 10334; 20 km (12 mi) east-southeast of Mga
114	104	7 November 1942	07:15	Hurricane	PQ 11752; Lake Ladoga	177♠	165	23 February 1943	09:16	LaGG-3	PQ 36 Ost 00252; 10 km (6.2 mi) east of Gatchina
115	105	16 December 1942	11:25	Yak-4	PQ 11872; 30 km (19 mi) northeast of Schlüsselburg	178♠	166	23 February 1943	11:02	LaGG-3	PQ 36 Ost 10152 southeast of Schlüsselburg
116	106	16 December 1942	11:35	MiG-3	PQ 00251; 15 km (9.3 mi) west-southwest of Schlüsselburg	179♠	167	23 February 1943	11:08 (Note: According to Mathews and Foreman claimed at 11:07.)	LaGG-3	PQ 36 Ost 10151 southeast of Schlüsselburg
117	107	16 December 1942	11:36 (Note: According to Mathews and Foreman claimed at 11:38.)	MiG-3	PQ 00261; 10 km (6.2 mi) southwest of Schlüsselburg	180		28 February 1943	09:35	MiG-3	PQ 35 Ost 28271
118	108	16 December 1942	13:55	fighter aircraft	PQ 01862; 20 km (12 mi) north-northwest of Schlüsselburg	181♠	168	7 March 1943	09:07	LaGG-3	PQ 35 Ost 18264; 30 km (19 mi) east-southeast of Staraya Russa
119	109	29 December 1942	13:59	I-15	PQ 18710	182♠	169	7 March 1943	09:09	LaGG-3	PQ 35 Ost 18144; 30 km (19 mi) northwest of Demyansk
120♠	110	30 December 1942	09:30	Il-2	PQ 28171; 25 km (16 mi) west-northwest of Demyansk	183♠	170	7 March 1943	09:14	LaGG-3	PQ 35 Ost 18243; 20 km (12 mi) southeast of Staraya Russa
121♠	111	30 December 1942	09:55 (Note: According to Mathews and Foreman claimed at 09:56.)	Il-2	PQ 28174; 25 km (16 mi) west-northwest of Demyansk	184♠	171	7 March 1943	11:50	La-5 (Note: According to Mathews and Foreman claimed as a Bell P-39 Airacobra.)	PQ 35 Ost 18451; 40 km (25 mi) west of Demyansk
122♠	112	30 December 1942	10:00	LaGG-3	PQ 28131; 30 km (19 mi) north of Demyansk	185♠	172	7 March 1943	14:32	Il-2	PQ 35 Ost 18194; 20 km (12 mi) south-southeast of Staraya Russa
123♠	113	30 December 1942	12:00	LaGG-3	PQ 28114; 40 km (25 mi) northwest of Demyansk	186♠	173	7 March 1943	14:34	Il-2	PQ 35 Ost 18194; 20 km (12 mi) south-southeast of Staraya Russa
124♠	114	30 December 1942	12:05	LaGG-3	PQ 28121; 35 km (22 mi) northwest of Demyansk	187♠	174	7 March 1943	14:37	Il-2	PQ 35 Ost 18361; 40 km (25 mi) south of Staraya Russa
125♠	115	30 December 1942	12:12	Il-2	PQ 18264; 30 km (19 mi) east-southeast of Staraya Russa	188♠	175	7 March 1943	14:40	Il-2	PQ 35 Ost 18363; 40 km (25 mi) south of Staraya Russa
126♠	116	30 December 1942	12:13 (Note: According to Mathews and Foreman claimed at 12:20.)	LaGG-3	PQ 28113; 40 km (25 mi) northwest of Demyansk	189♠	176	7 March 1943	14:42	Il-2	PQ 35 Ost 18391; 45 km (28 mi) northeast of Cholm
127♠	117	30 December 1942	12:20 (Note: According to Mathews and Foreman claimed at 12:25.)	LaGG-3	PQ 28141; 30 km (19 mi) northwest of Demyansk	190	177	14 March 1943	13:25	LaGG-3	PQ 35 Ost 18453; 40 km (25 mi) west of Demyansk
128	118	6 January 1943	12:45 (Note: According to Mathews and Foreman claimed at 12:46.)	Il-2	PQ 2814; 20 km (12 mi) west of Demyansk	191	178	14 March 1943	13:32	P-40	PQ 35 Ost 18281
129	119	6 January 1943	12:53	Il-2	PQ 28121; 35 km (22 mi) northwest of Demyansk	192	179	15 March 1943	15:30	LaGG-3	PQ 35 Ost 18434; 30 km (19 mi) east-southeast of Staraya Russa
130	120	6 January 1943	12:55	LaGG-3	PQ 28213; 30 km (19 mi) east-southeast of Staraya Russa	193	180	15 March 1943	15:33	LaGG-3	PQ 35 Ost 18364; 40 km (25 mi) south of Staraya Russa
131♠	121	7 January 1943	09:20	P-51	PQ 18233; 30 km (19 mi) east-southeast of Staraya Russa	194	181	15 March 1943	15:35	LaGG-3	PQ 35 Ost 18451; 40 km (25 mi) west of Demyansk
132♠	122	7 January 1943	09:25	LaGG-3	PQ 18231; 30 km (19 mi) east-southeast of Staraya Russa	195♠	182	16 March 1943	10:43	P-39	PQ 35 Ost 18261; 30 km (19 mi) northwest of Schlüsselburg
133♠	123	7 January 1943	09:27	LaGG-3	PQ 29743; 45 km (28 mi) east-northeast of Staraya Russa	196♠	183	16 March 1943	10:48	LaGG-3	PQ 35 Ost 18214; 20 km (12 mi) east-southeast of Staraya Russa
134♠	124	7 January 1943	09:30	LaGG-3	PQ 29752; 20 km (12 mi) southwest of Arensburg	197♠	184	16 March 1943	10:50	LaGG-3	PQ 35 Ost 18241; 20 km (12 mi) southeast of Staraya Russa
135♠	125	7 January 1943	09:32	LaGG-3	PQ 29714; 55 km (34 mi) northwest of Valday	198♠	185	16 March 1943	10:53	LaGG-3	PQ 35 Ost 18244; 20 km (12 mi) southeast of Staraya Russa
136	126	10 January 1943	12:45 (Note: According to Mathews and Foreman claimed as a Petlyakov Pe-2 at 11:40.)	Il-2	PQ 91713; 20 km (12 mi) southeast of Zelenogorsk	199♠	186	16 March 1943	10:54 (Note: According to Mathews and Foreman claimed at 10:56.)	LaGG-3	PQ 35 Ost 18164, 10 km (6.2 mi) south of Charkov; 20 km (12 mi) southeast of Staraya Russa
137♠	127	12 January 1943	10:55 (Note: According to Mathews and Foreman claimed at 10:54.)	Il-2	PQ 10114 vicinity of Schlüsselburg	200	187	17 March 1943	16:13	LaGG-3	PQ 35 Ost 18241; 40 km (25 mi) southeast of Staraya Russa
138♠	128	12 January 1943	10:55	Il-2	PQ 10113 vicinity of Schlüsselburg	201	188	17 March 1943	16:15	LaGG-3	PQ 35 Ost 18421; 30 km (19 mi) south-southeast of Staraya Russa
139♠	129	12 January 1943	11:03	Il-2	PQ 10123 east of Schlüsselburg	202	189	17 March 1943	16:16	LaGG-3	PQ 35 Ost 18332; 30 km (19 mi) south of Staraya Russa
140♠	130	12 January 1943	11:12	Il-2	PQ 10113 vicinity of Schlüsselburg	203	190	17 March 1943	16:19 (Note: According to Mathews and Foreman claimed at 16:18.)	LaGG-3	PQ 35 Ost 18361; 40 km (25 mi) south of Staraya Russa
141♠	131	12 January 1943	11:16	I-16	PQ 00263; 10 km (6.2 mi) southwest of Schlüsselburg						
– Stab of Jagdgeschwader 1 –
204	191	2 May 1943	19:43	Spitfire	120 km (75 mi) west of Haarlem	206	193	8 October 1943	15:28	B-17	PQ 05 Ost S/FR-5/2; Diepholz-Quakenbrück
205	192	16 May 1943	13:12	P-47	25 km (16 mi) north Zeebrugge						
