= List of aerial victories claimed by Joachim Müncheberg =

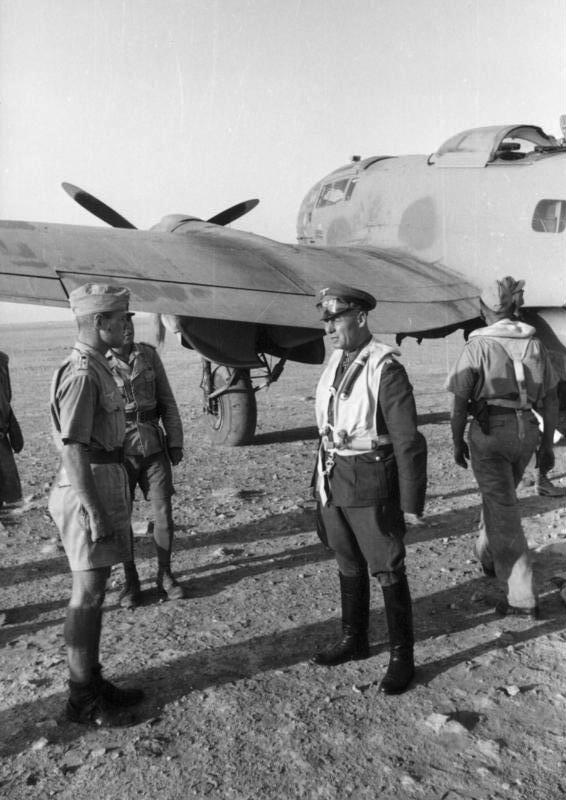
Müncheberg (left) and General (later field marshal) Erwin Rommel in North Africa, 1941. (Note: Hardly visible from this angle, the picture shows Müncheberg wearing a bandage on his left knee. He injured himself in a sporting competition at Erfurt in May 1941. He fell running the 110 metres hurdles.)

Joachim Müncheberg (31 December 1918 – 23 March 1943) was a German Luftwaffe fighter pilot during World War II and an ace credited with 135 air victories. The majority of his victories were claimed over the Western Front, with 33 claims over the Eastern Front. Of his 102 aerial victories achieved over the Western Allies, 46 were against Supermarine Spitfire fighters.

== List of aerial victories claimed ==
According to US historian David T. Zabecki, Müncheberg was credited with 135 aerial victories. His 135 aerial victories were claimed in more than 500 combat missions, 102 on the Western Front - including 19 over Malta, one in Yugoslavia and 24 in North Africa - and 33 on the Eastern Front. His tally includes at least 46 Supermarine Spitfire fighter aircraft shot down. Mathews and Foreman, authors of Luftwaffe Aces - Biographies and Victory Claims, researched the German Federal Archives and found documentation for 135 aerial victory claims, plus nine further unconfirmed claims. This number includes 102 on the Western Front and 33 on the Eastern Front.

Victory claims were logged to a map-reference (PQ = Planquadrat), for example "PQ 47591". The Luftwaffe grid map (Jägermeldenetz) covered all of Europe, western Russia, and North Africa. It was composed of rectangles measuring 15 minutes of latitude by 30 minutes of longitude, an area of about 360 square miles (930 km^{2}). These sectors were then subdivided into 36 smaller units to give a location area 3 km × 4 km (1.9 mi × 2.5 mi) in size.

This and the – (dash) indicates unwitnessed aerial victory claims for which Müncheberg did not receive credit.
This and the ? (question mark) indicates information discrepancies listed by Prien, Stemmer, Rodeike, Bock, Mathews and Foreman.

Claim	Date	Time	Type	Location	Claim	Date	Time	Type	Location
– Stab III. Gruppe of Jagdgeschwader 26 "Schlageter" – "Phoney War" — 23 September 1939 – 9 May 1940
1	7 November 1939	13:43	Blenheim	southwest of Opladen, at the Wupper estuary					
– Stab III. Gruppe of Jagdgeschwader 26 "Schlageter" – Battle of France — 10 May – 25 June 1940
2	11 May 1940	17:45	Curtiss	northwest of Antwerp	6	31 May 1940	15:35	Lysander	Veurne-Dunkirk
3	14 May 1940	18:45	Hurricane	east of Ath	7	31 May 1940	15:40	Hurricane	southwest of Dunkirk
4	15 May 1940	13:00	Hurricane	Overijse	8	31 May 1940	15:45	Hurricane	northeast of Dunkirk
5	29 May 1940	18:10	Spitfire	west of Dunkirk	9	31 May 1940	20:10	Spitfire	Dunkirk/Dover
– Stab III. Gruppe of Jagdgeschwader 26 "Schlageter" – At the Channel and over England — 26 June 1940 – 20 August 1941
10	28 July 1940	15:15	Hurricane	15 km (9.3 mi) northeast of Dover	12	14 August 1940	13:29	Hurricane	Folkestone/Dover
11	8 August 1940	12:55	Spitfire	northeast of Margate	13	15 August 1940	16:01	Spitfire	southeast of Dover
– 7. Staffel of Jagdgeschwader 26 "Schlageter" – At the Channel and over England — 21 August 1940 – February 1941
14	24 August 1940	12:22	Hurricane	Ashford	19	11 September 1940	19:25	Spitfire	east of Ashford
15	31 August 1940	10:00	Hurricane	northwest of Braintree	20	14 September 1940	17:05	Spitfire	south of Maidstone
16	1 September 1940	14:52	Hurricane	west of Goudhurst	21	17 October 1940	14:55	Bloch 151	Faversham
17	6 September 1940	10:28	Hurricane	Dungeness	22	25 October 1940	14:40	Spitfire	Marden
18	7 September 1940	18:45	Spitfire	southeast of London	23	14 November 1940	15:32	Spitfire	southeast of Dover
– 7. Staffel of Jagdgeschwader 26 "Schlageter" – Sicily and North Africa — February – September 1941
24	12 February 1941	16:41	Hurricane	south of Siġġiewi, Malta	37	23 April 1941	18:07	Hurricane	southeast of Ħal Far, Malta
25	16 February 1941	10:38	Hurricane	southwest of Malta	38	29 April 1941	18:47	Hurricane	St. Paul's Bay
26	16 February 1941	10:45	Hurricane	east of Ta' Vnezja, Malta	39	1 May 1941	07:53? (Note: According to Mathews and Foreman claimed at 07:55.)	Hurricane	southeast of St. Paul's Bay; 3 km (1.9 mi) south of Valletta airfield
27	25 February 1941	16:45	Hurricane	east of St. Paul's Bay	40	1 May 1941	07:55? (Note: According to Mathews and Foreman claimed at 17:14.)	Hurricane	3 km (1.9 mi) south of Valletta southwest of Luqa, Malta
28	26 February 1941	14:06	Hurricane	Krendi, Malta south of Krendi, Malta	41	1 May 1941	17:15	Hurricane	southwest of Luqa, Malta
29	26 February 1941	14:10	Hurricane	10 km (6.2 mi) south of Malta	42	6 May 1941	12:22	Hurricane	northeast of St. Paul's Bay northwest of St. Paul's Bay
30	2 March 1941	10:45	Hurricane	2 km (1.2 mi) west of Marsaxlokk	43	6 May 1941	12:26	Hurricane	1 km (0.62 mi) southwest of Ħal Far, Malta
31	5 March 1941	17:32	Hurricane	south of Ħal Far, Malta	— (Note: This unconfirmed claim is listed by Mathews and Foreman, but not by Prien, Stemmer, Rodeike and Bock.)	25 May 1941	15:00	Hurricane	Ta' Qali, Malta
32	15 March 1941	07:50	Wellington	10 km (6.2 mi) northwest of Gozo	—	25 May 1941	15:00	Hurricane	Ta' Qali, Malta
33	28 March 1941	17:20	Hurricane	south of Gozo	44	20 June 1941	07:55	Hurricane	east of Buq Buq
34	6 April 1941	12:05	Fury	northeast of Podgorica	45	24 June 1941	08:00	Hurricane	Lavyet Ungheila
—	6 April 1941	—	Breguet 19	Podgorica	46	15 July 1941	18:40	P-40	southwest of Ras el Milh
35	11 April 1941	11:31	Hurricane	southeast of Malta	47	29 July 1941	17:48	P-40	40 km (25 mi) east of Bardia
36	11 April 1941	11:53	Hurricane	southeast of St. Paul's Bay	48	29 July 1941	17:52	P-40	40 km (25 mi) east of Bardia
– 7. Staffel of Jagdgeschwader 26 "Schlageter" – At the Channel and over England — 22 June – September 1941
49	26 August 1941	19:30	Spitfire	2 km (1.2 mi) north of Gravelines	53	7 September 1941	17:22	Spitfire	northwest of Montreuil
50	29 August 1941	08:40	Spitfire	10 km (6.2 mi) northeast of Dunkirk	54	16 September 1941	19:40	Spitfire	east of Boulogne
51	4 September 1941	17:26	Spitfire	Vollezele	55	18 September 1941	16:05	Spitfire	Yvetot
52	4 September 1941	17:29	Spitfire	Zeggers	56	18 September 1941	16:15	Spitfire	Yvetot; Sainte-Hélène
– Stab II. Gruppe of Jagdgeschwader 26 "Schlageter" – At the Channel and over England — October – 31 December 1941
57	13 October 1941	14:33	Spitfire	Samer	60	8 December 1941	14:17	Spitfire	Boulogne
58	8 November 1941	13:07	Spitfire	Loon-Plage	61	16 December 1941	16:01	Spitfire	northwest of Dunkirk
59? (Note: According to Mathews and Foreman this claim is unconfirmed.)	8 November 1941	13:15	Spitfire	north-northeast of Dunkirk	62	16 December 1941	16:04	Spitfire	north of Gravelines
– Stab II. Gruppe of Jagdgeschwader 26 "Schlageter" – On the Western Front — 1 January – June 1942
63	13 March 1942	16:17	Spitfire	Wierre-Effroy	76	1 May 1942	19:31	Spitfire	southwest of Calais
64	24 March 1942	16:30	Spitfire	Pendé, northwest of Rudé; Rue–Cambron	—	1 May 1942	19:40	Spitfire	5 km (3.1 mi) north of Calais
65	24 March 1942	16:35	Spitfire	Cambron	77	6 May 1942	18:53? (Note: According to Mathews and Foreman claimed at 18:55.)	Spitfire	northwest of Cap Gris Nez
66	4 April 1942	11:46	Spitfire	off Calais	—	9 May 1942	13:43	Spitfire	15 km (9.3 mi) south of Gravelines
67	10 April 1942	17:50	Spitfire	northwest of Étaples	—	9 May 1942	13:44	Spitfire	15 km (9.3 mi) south of Gravelines
68	25 April 1942	16:40	Spitfire	southwest of Crécy	—	17 May 1942	17:35	Spitfire	Guînes–Saint-Omer
69	25 April 1942	16:43	Spitfire	southwest of Rue	78	31 May 1942	19:37	Spitfire	south of Crécy (forest area)
70	26 April 1942	18:05? (Note: According to Mathews and Foreman claimed at 18:06.)	Spitfire	west-northwest of Calais; 10–15 km (6.2–9.3 mi) west of Calais	79	31 May 1942	19:41	Spitfire	Quend Plage les Pins
71	26 April 1942	18:06? (Note: According to Mathews and Foreman claimed at 18:07.)	Spitfire	15 km (9.3 mi) west of Cap Gris Nez; 10 km (6.2 mi) west of Cap Gris Nez	80	2 June 1942	11:01	Spitfire	southwest of Abbeville
72	27 April 1942	14:47	Spitfire	northeast of Dunkirk	81	2 June 1942	11:07	Spitfire	15 km (9.3 mi) west of Étaples
73	27 April 1942	16:06	Spitfire	north of Mardyck	82	20 June 1942	15:44	Spitfire	south of Ardres
74	29 April 1942	16:04	Spitfire	Le Touquet	83	20 June 1942	15:47	Spitfire	east of Boulogne
75	30 April 1942	19:36	Spitfire	west of Somme Estuary					
– Stab of Jagdgeschwader 51 – Eastern Front — 1 May 1942 – 3 February 1943
84	3 August 1942	10:32	Pe-2	PQ 47591, north-northeast of Rzhev vicinity of Rzhev	101	5 September 1942	17:55? (Note: According to Mathews and Foreman claimed at 17:57.)	P-39	PQ 6638, Kubinka; 15 km (9.3 mi) east-northeast of Mozajsk
85	3 August 1942	10:36	Pe-2	PQ 47514, north-northwest of Rzhev; 25 km (16 mi) northwest of Rzhev	102	9 September 1942	17:08	Il-2	PQ 47733, southeast of Rzhev; 5 km (3.1 mi) southeast of Rzhev
86	4 August 1942	10:38	Il-2	6 km (3.7 mi) east-northeast of Zubtsov	103	9 September 1942	17:12	Il-2	PQ 47843, west-southwest of Zubtsov; 15 km (9.3 mi) southwest of Zubtsov
87	5 August 1942	18:48	LaGG-3	PQ 4788; 10 km (6.2 mi) southeast of Rogatschew	104	10 September 1942	07:09	Pe-2	PQ 47762, south-southeast of Zubtsov; 10 km (6.2 mi) south of Zubtsov
88	9 August 1942	14:30	MiG-3	PQ 47844, south of Zubtsov; 10 km (6.2 mi) south of Zubtsov	105	10 September 1942	07:13	Il-2	PQ 47764, southeast of Zubtsov; 15 km (9.3 mi) south of Zubtsov
89	10 August 1942	18:40	Yak-1	PQ 47563, north of Rzhev; 10 km (6.2 mi) north of Rzhev	106	10 September 1942	10:35	LaGG-3	PQ 47811, northwest of Zubtsov vicinity of Zubtsov
90	22 August 1942	10:25	Il-2	PQ 47761, south-southeast of Rzhev; 15 km (9.3 mi) southwest of Zubtsov	107	13 September 1942? (Note: According to Mathews and Foreman claimed on 14 September 1942 at 17:07.)	06:07?	Pe-2	PQ 47762, 8 km (5.0 mi) east-southeast of Rzhev; 5 km (3.1 mi) southeast of Rzhev
91	24 August 1942	06:20	Il-2	PQ 47754, southeast of Rzhev; 15 km (9.3 mi) south-southwest of Rzhev	108	14 September 1942	07:25	Il-2	PQ 47593, east-southeast of Rzhev; 15 km (9.3 mi) southwest of Zubtsov
92	24 August 1942	06:21	Il-2	PQ 47791, south of Rzhev; 20 km (12 mi) south-southwest of Zubtsov	109	14 September 1942	17:01	Il-2	Rzhev
93	25 August 1942	17:11	Pe-2	PQ 47381, north of Rzhev; 30 km (19 mi) north-northwest of Rzhev	110	14 September 1942	17:13	Pe-2	PQ 47591, 1 km (0.62 mi) north of Rzhev vicinity of Rzhev
94	2 September 1942	08:23	LaGG-3	southwest of Karmanovo	111	22 September 1942	09:25	MiG-3	1 km (0.62 mi) northeast of Klimovo; 25 km (16 mi) west-southwest of Staritsa
95	2 September 1942	10:52	Il-2	southwest of Gshatsk southwest of Gagarin	112	22 September 1942	09:31	R-5	1 km (0.62 mi) southeast of Klimovo; 25 km (16 mi) west-southwest of Staritsa
96	2 September 1942	10:55	Il-2	southwest of Gshatsk south-southwest of Gagarin	113	26 September 1942	12:23	LaGG-3	20 km (12 mi) north of Rzhev
97	2 September 1942	10:55	Il-2	southwest of Gshatsk south-southwest of Gagarin	114	26 September 1942	16:08	LaGG-3	12 km (7.5 mi) west-southwest of Rzhev; 20 km (12 mi) west of Rzhev
98	3 September 1942	14:32	Il-2	PQ 46192 vicinity of Konaja	115	27 September 1942	06:59	LaGG-3	15 km (9.3 mi) northeast of Rzhev vicinity of Rzhev
99	4 September 1942	17:35	Pe-2	south of Zubtsov	116	27 September 1942	07:03	LaGG-3	PQ 47612, Klimovo; 25 km (16 mi) west-southwest of Staritsa
100	5 September 1942	17:53	P-39	Kubinka					
– Stab of Jagdgeschwader 77 – North Africa — 1 November – 31 December 1942
117	9 November 1942	15:07	Spitfire	east of Buq Buq	120	14 December 1942	15:08	P-40	15 km (9.3 mi) southwest of El Agheila
—	9 November 1942	—	Spitfire		121	14 December 1942	15:25	P-40	20 km (12 mi) southwest of El Agheila
118	27 November 1942	07:32	Spitfire	5 km (3.1 mi) east of Bir el Ginn	122	15 December 1942	10:58	P-40	Ras el Aali
119	10 December 1942	15:05	P-40	10 km (6.2 mi) northwest of El Agheila					
– Stab of Jagdgeschwader 77 – North Africa — 1 January – 23 March 1943
123	13 January 1943	08:45	Baltimore	northeast of Bir Dufan	129	28 January 1943	17:40	P-40	5 km (3.1 mi) southeast of Tarhuna
124	14 January 1943	11:12? (Note: According to Mathews and Foreman claimed at 11:17.)	P-40	25 km (16 mi) southeast of Bir Dufan	130	10 March 1943	16:33	P-40	north of Ksar el Hirane
125	14 January 1943	11:17? (Note: According to Mathews and Foreman claimed at 11:21.)	P-40	Bir Dufan airfield	131	10 March 1943	16:48	P-40	north of Ksar Foum Tatahouine
126	14 January 1943	11:23? (Note: According to Mathews and Foreman claimed at 11:23.)	P-40	Bir Dufan airfield	132	13 March 1943	15:04	P-40	Matmata airfield vicinity of La Fauconnerie
126? (Note: According to Mathews and Foreman this claim is listed as Müncheberg's 126th aerial victory. However, Prien, Stemmer, Rodeike and Bock do not list this claim.)	27 January 1943	16:40	P-40		133	13 March 1943	17:51	P-39	10 km (6.2 mi) northwest of La Fauconnerie vicinity of La Fauconnerie
127	27 January 1943	12:55	P-40	10 km (6.2 mi) southeast of Zuara	134	22 March 1943	14:27	P-40	75 km (47 mi) south-southwest of Gabès vicinity of El Hamma
128	27 January 1943	13:05	P-40	30 km (19 mi) south of Sorman	135	23 March 1943	09:50	Spitfire	40 km (25 mi) south-southwest of Maknassy
