= Helmut Neumann =

German World War II fighter pilot

- Born: 21 November 1921; Frankfurt am Main, Weimar Republic
- Died: 21 April 1992 (aged 70); Frankfurt am Main, Germany
- Military career
- Allegiance: Nazi Germany
- Branch: Luftwaffe
- Service years: 1939–1945
- Rank: Leutnant (second lieutenant)
- Unit: JG 5
- Commands: 14./JG 5
- Conflicts: World War II
- Awards: Knight's Cross of the Iron Cross

Helmut Neumann (21 November 1921 – 21 April 1992) was a Luftwaffe (German air force) fighter ace during World War II. He is credited with 62 aerial victories achieved in 162 combat missions, becoming an "ace-in-a-day" on two separate occasions. All but two of his aerial victories were claimed on the Eastern Front.

== Career ==
Neumann was born on 21 November 1921 in Frankfurt am Main, at the time in the Province of Hesse-Nassau within the Weimar Republic. Following completion of flight, (Note: Flight training in the Luftwaffe progressed through the levels A1, A2 and B1, B2, referred to as A/B flight training. A training included theoretical and practical training in aerobatics, navigation, long-distance flights and dead-stick landings. The B courses included high-altitude flights, instrument flights, night landings and training to handle the aircraft in difficult situations.) Neumann completed his fighter pilot training with the Ergänzungs-Jagdgruppe West, a supplementary training unit for fighter pilots, based in Cazaux, France. He was then posted to 7. Staffel (7th squadron) of Jagdgeschwader 5 (JG 5—5th Fighter Wing) on 11 August 1942 based in Kirkenes. At the time, 7. Staffel was commanded by Oberleutnant Hans-Curt Graf von Sponeck, son of Hans Graf von Sponeck, and subordinated to III. Gruppe (3rd group) of JG 5 headed by Hauptmann Günther Scholz. Two days later, he crash landed his Messerschmitt Bf 109 E-7 (Werknummer 6033—factory number) at Kirkenes, nearly destroying the aircraft.

On 4 April 1943 at 13:10, 7. and 9. Staffel were scrambled to intercept an inbound Soviet formation of Ilyushin Il-2 ground-attack aircraft, escorted by Bell P-39 Airacobra and Curtiss P-40 Warhawk fighters. In this encounter, Neumann claimed one of the P-39 fighters shot down which was not confirmed. During this aerial engagement, his Bf 109 F-4 (Werknummer 8562) suffered engine failure, resulting in a forced landing at Petsamo. On 26 September, Neumann was wounded in combat when his Bf 109 G-6 (Werknummer 15791) was hit by anti-aircraft artillery during a search and rescue mission southeast of the Liza Bight. Nevertheless, he managed to fly back to Petsamo. Searching for Leutnant Friedrich Schumann, who remained missing in action, shrapnel from the anti-aircraft artillery shell had hit him in the throat. Heavily bleeding, he had to be pulled out if his aircraft. Nearly dying from the loss of blood, his speech remained impaired for the rest of his life and Neumann was hospitalized for six months.

=== Squadron leader and end of war ===
On 4 September 1944, Finland implemented a ceasefire followed by the Soviet Union a day later, effectively ending the Continuation War. Consequently, IV. Gruppe of JG 5 was ordered to move to northern Norway. That day, 14. Staffel relocated to Trondheim-Værnes Airfield and placed under the command of Neumann, replacing Oberleutnant Horst Keim. On 26 September, Neumann claimed his 50th aerial victory when he shot down a Yakovlev Yak-9 fighter.

On 13 January 1945, Neumann flew his last combat mission with JG 5. He was then transferred to Ergänzungs-Jagdgeschwader 2 for conversion training to the Messerschmitt Me 262 jet fighter. With this unit, he flew the Me 262 for the first time at Lechfeld Airfield on 28 January. Command of his former 14. Staffel of JG 5 was transferred to Leutnant Hans Richter. Neumann was awarded the Knight's Cross of the Iron Cross (Ritterkreuz des Eisernen Kreuzes) on 12 March 1945 for 62 aerial victories claimed.

== Later life ==
Neumann died on 21 April 1992 at the age of 70 in his home town Frankfurt am Main, Germany.

== Summary of career ==
=== Aerial victory claims ===
According to US historian David T. Zabecki, Neumann was credited with 62 aerial victories. Spick also lists him with 62 aerial victories claimed in 162 combat missions, and a mission-to-claim ratio of 2.61. Mathews and Foreman, authors of Luftwaffe Aces — Biographies and Victory Claims, researched the German Federal Archives and found records for 62 aerial victories, claimed in 162 combat missions. All but two of his aerial victories were claimed on the Eastern Front.

Victory claims were logged to a map-reference (PQ = Planquadrat), for example "PQ 37 Ost RC-3". The Luftwaffe grid map (Jägermeldenetz) covered all of Europe, western Russia and North Africa and was composed of rectangles measuring 15 minutes of latitude by 30 minutes of longitude, an area of about 360 square miles (930 km^{2}). These sectors were then subdivided into 36 smaller units to give a location area 3 km × 4 km (1.9 mi × 2.5 mi) in size.

Chronicle of aerial victories
This and the ♠ (Ace of spades) indicates those aerial victories which made Neumann an "ace-in-a-day", a term which designates a fighter pilot who has shot down five or more airplanes in a single day. This and the ? (exclamation mark) indicates information discrepancies listed by Prien, Stemmer, Rodeike, Balke, Bock, Mombeek, Mathews, and Foreman.
Claim	Date	Time	Type	Location	Claim	Date	Time	Type	Location
– 7. Staffel of Jagdgeschwader 5 – Eastern Front, eastern and northern Norway, and Finland — 1 January – 31 December 1943
1	22 July 1943	23:02	Hurricane	PQ 37 Ost RC-3, 15 km (9.3 mi) west of Pummanki	6	23 August 1943	04:53	P-39	PQ 37 Ost SE 3, north of Eyna Guba; 10 km (6.2 mi) north of Eyna Guba
2	25 July 1943	02:55	P-39	PQ 37 Ost QC-4; 18 km (11 mi) south of Kiberg	7	2 September 1943	17:50	P-40	northwest of Pummanki; 8 km (5.0 mi) northwest of Pummanki
3	25 July 1943	02:58	P-39	PQ 37 Ost QC-6; 20 km (12 mi) southeast of Kiberg	8	14 September 1943	18:39	P-39	PQ 37 Ost RC 46, northwest of Petsamo; 20 km (12 mi) northwest of Petsamo Bight
4	18 August 1943	12:43	P-39	southeast of Eyna Guba; 4 km (2.5 mi) southeast of Eyna Guba	9	14 September 1943	18:53	P-40	PQ 37 Ost RC 93, south of Heinäsaari; 4 km (2.5 mi) southwest of Heinäsaari
5	18 August 1943	14:45	P-39	southeast of Eyna Guba; 8 km (5.0 mi) southeast of Eyna Guba					
– 7. Staffel of Jagdgeschwader 5 – Eastern Front and northern Norway, and Finland — May – July 1944
10	11 May 1944	07:35	Yak-9	PQ 37 Ost QC-5/6; 35 km (22 mi) northwest of Vayda-Guba	29♠	17 June 1944	21:35	Boston	PQ 37 Ost RC-4/1; 34 km (21 mi) northeast of Jaarnet
11	16 May 1944	19:15	P-39	PQ 37 Ost QC-3/8; 20 km (12 mi) east of Kiberg	30	27 June 1944	16:41	Yak-9	PQ 37 Ost SD-6/6; 24 km (15 mi) southeast of Kirkenes
12	16 May 1944	19:40	P-39	PQ 37 Ost QF-9/5; 31 km (19 mi) north-northeast of Cape Lazar	31	27 June 1944	16:42	P-40	PQ 37 Ost SD-8/4; 18 km (11 mi) south-southwest of Kirkenes
13	25 May 1944	21:47	P-40	north-northeast of Berlevåg; 18 km (11 mi) north-northeast of Berlevåg	32	27 June 1944	16:46	Boston	PQ 37 Ost RB-4/5; 21 km (13 mi) northeast of Kirkenes
14	25 May 1944	21:49	Boston	north-northeast of Berlevåg; 29 km (18 mi) north-northeast of Berlevåg	33♠	28 June 1944	00:01	Boston	PQ 37 Ost SU-3/3; 4 km (2.5 mi) northwest of Kirkenes
15	25 May 1944	21:51	P-39	north of Berlevåg; 16 km (9.9 mi) north of Berlevåg	34♠	28 June 1944	00:03	Boston	PQ 37 Ost SU-8/1; 20 km (12 mi) southwest of Kirkenes
16	26 May 1944	05:01	P-40	north-northeast of Hamningberg; 19 km (12 mi) north-northeast of Hamningberg	35♠	28 June 1944	00:11	P-40	PQ 37 Ost RD-9/6; 13 km (8.1 mi) northeast of Ivarnet
17	26 May 1944	05:02	P-39	north of Hamningberg; 15 km (9.3 mi) north-northeast of Hamningberg	36♠	28 June 1944	03:47	P-40	PQ 37 Ost RD-7/4; 6 km (3.7 mi) north-northeast of Petsamo Fjord
18	26 May 1944	05:03	Il-2	northeast of Hamningberg; 12 km (7.5 mi) north-northeast of Hamningberg	37♠	28 June 1944	03:48	P-40	PQ 37 Ost SD-2/3; 13 km (8.1 mi) northeast of Petsamo Fjord
19	26 May 1944	05:07	P-39	northeast of Hamningberg; 26 km (16 mi) north-northeast of Hamningberg	38♠	28 June 1944	03:59	Yak-9	PQ 37 Ost RC-8/9; 12 km (7.5 mi) northwest of Petsamo Fjord
20	15 June 1944	02:42	Yak-9	PQ 37 Ost RD-6/8; 8 km (5.0 mi) north of Pumanki	39	4 July 1944	03:47	P-40	PQ 37 Ost NB-7/5; 21 km (13 mi) northeast of Makur
21	15 June 1944	19:28	P-40	PQ 37 Ost SD-2/3, northeast of Kirkenes; 8 km (5.0 mi) southwest of Pumanki	40	4 July 1944	19:15	Boston	PQ 37 Ost RA-2/5; 22 km (14 mi) northwest of Jaarnet
22♠	17 June 1944	07:48	P-40	PQ 37 Ost PC-6/2; 12 km (7.5 mi) west of Kiberg	41	4 July 1944	19:19	P-40	PQ 37 Ost SA-3/4; 18 km (11 mi) east of Kirkenes
23♠	17 June 1944	07:49	P-40	PQ 37 Ost PC-9/3; 18 km (11 mi) east-northeast of Kiberg	42	17 July 1944	18:54	Yak-9	PQ 37 Ost RA-4/1; 21 km (13 mi) north of Kirkenes
24♠	17 June 1944	08:06	Boston	PQ 37 Ost QC-2/7; 20 km (12 mi) south of Kiberg	43	17 July 1944	18:56	Yak-9	PQ 37 Ost RA-5/4; 19 km (12 mi) west of Kirkenes
25♠	17 June 1944	08:10	Il-2	PQ 37 Ost/QC-9/1; 27 km (17 mi) southwest of Kiberg	44	17 July 1944	18:59	Boston	PQ 37 Ost SB-4/9; 27 km (17 mi) southeast of Kirkenes
26♠	17 June 1944	21:28	P-40	PQ 37 Ost RB-6/5; 38 km (24 mi) northeast of Kirkenes	45	28 July 1944	13:15	P-39	PQ 37 Ost RU-3/7; 15 km (9.3 mi) southeast of Vadsø
27♠	17 June 1944	21:29	P-39	PQ 37 Ost RB-5/3; 35 km (22 mi) northeast of Kirkenes	46	28 July 1944	13:22	Il-2	PQ 37 Ost RA-3/6; 17 km (11 mi) southeast of Ekkerøya
28♠	17 June 1944	21:30	P-40	PQ 37 Ost RB-7/8; 15 km (9.3 mi) northeast of Jaarnet	47	28 July 1944	13:26	P-39	PQ 37 Ost RC-5/4; 16 km (9.9 mi) northwest of Heinäxaret island
– Stab of III. Gruppe of Jagdgeschwader 5 – Eastern Front — August 1944
48	17 August 1944	10:18	Pe-2	PQ 37 Ost RB; 10 km (6.2 mi) south of Ekkerøya	49	23 August 1944	12:17? (Note: According to Mombeek, Mathews and Foreman claimed at 12:15.)	Il-2	PQ 37 Ost RQ; 5 km (3.1 mi) southeast of Ekkerøya
– 14. Staffel of Jagdgeschwader 5 – Eastern Front — 6 September – 6 November 1944
50? (Note: This claim is not lised by Mombeek.)	26 September 1944	16:48	Yak-9	40 km (25 mi) east of Ekkerøya	56	8 October 1944	09:03	P-39	35 km (22 mi) southeast of Petsamo
51?	27 September 1944	—	Pe-2	Ekkerøya; 23 km (14 mi) east-southeast of Ekkerøya	57	9 October 1944	08:31	P-39	27 km (17 mi) southeast of Petsamo
52?	27 September 1944	11:41? (Note: According to Mathews and Foreman claimed at 11:40.)	P-39	23 km (14 mi) south of Kiberg	58	9 October 1944	08:34	P-39	40 km (25 mi) southeast of Petsamo
53	27 September 1944	11:43	P-39	30 km (19 mi) south of Kiberg	59	9 October 1944	08:37	Boston	40 km (25 mi) southeast of Petsamo
54	27 September 1944	11:44	Boston	40 km (25 mi) east of Ekkerøya	60	9 October 1944	14:47	Boston	52 km (32 mi) southeast of Petsamo
55	29 September 1944	15:27	P-39	28 km (17 mi) east-southeast of Ekkerøya; 26 km (16 mi) east-southeast of Ekkerøya					

=== Awards ===
- Iron Cross (1939) 2nd and 1st Class
- German Cross in Gold on 1 January 1945 as Leutnant in the 14./Jagdgeschwader 5
- Knight's Cross of the Iron Cross on 12 March 1945 as Leutnant and Staffelführer of the 14./Jagdgeschwader 5
