= Hermann Neuhoff =

German World War II fighter pilot (1918–2006)

- Born: 11 April 1918; Rheinhausen
- Died: 17 January 2006 (aged 87); Rheinhausen
- Military career
- Allegiance: Nazi Germany
- Branch: Luftwaffe
- Rank: Leutnant (second lieutenant)
- Unit: JG 53
- Commands: 6./JG 53
- Conflicts: World War II: Battle of France; Battle of Britain; Operation Barbarossa; Siege of Malta
- Awards: Knight's Cross of the Iron Cross

Hermann Neuhoff (11 April 1918 – 17 January 2006) was a Luftwaffe ace and recipient of the Knight's Cross of the Iron Cross. The Knight's Cross of the Iron Cross was the highest award in the military and paramilitary forces of Nazi Germany during World War II. On 10 April 1942, he was shot down during combat over Malta and was taken prisoner by British troops. During his career, he was credited with 40 aerial victories claimed in 452 missions. Neuhoff died on 17 January 2006 in his hometown Rheinhausen.

== Early life and career ==
Neuhoff was born on 11 April 1918 at Rheinhausen, now part of Duisburg, at the time in the Rhine Province within the German Empire. He joined the military service of the Luftwaffe and after flight and fighter pilot training, (Note: Flight training in the Luftwaffe progressed through the levels A1, A2 and B1, B2, referred to as A/B flight training. A training included theoretical and practical training in aerobatics, navigation, long-distance flights and dead-stick landings. The B courses included high-altitude flights, instrument flights, night landings, and training to handle the aircraft in difficult situations.) Neuhoff was posted to 3. Staffel (3rd squadron) of Jagdgeschwader 53 (JG 53—53rd Fighter Wing). The Staffel was commanded by Oberleutnant Wolfgang Lippert and subordinated to I. Gruppe (1st group) of JG 53 headed by Hauptmann Lothar von Janson.

== World War II ==
World War II in Europe began on Friday, 1 September 1939, when German forces invaded Poland. At the time, JG 53 was tasked with patrolling Germany's western border between Trier and Saarbrücken in what would be dubbed the "Phoney War" period of World War II. On 26 September, JG 53 was ordered to form its III. Gruppe at Wiesbaden–Erbenheim Airfield. Leadership of the Gruppe was given to Hauptmann Werner Mölders who had previously commanded 1. Staffel. Formation of the 7. Staffel was headed by Oberleutnant Wolf-Dietrich Wilcke and Neuhoff was assigned to this squadron holding the rank of Unteroffizier (non-commissioned officer). At the time, the Gruppe was equipped with the Messerschmitt Bf 109 E.

The Gruppe reached operational readiness on 10 October and flew its first combat missions during the "Phoney War". From 2–16 January 1940, Neuhoff and other pilots from III. Gruppe went on a ski vacation to the Vorarlberg. On 2 March, Neuhoff claimed his first aerial victory. In aerial combat with ten Morane-Saulnier M.S.406 and two Hawker Hurricane fighters near Völklingen, Neuhoff claimed a Hurricane shot down.

=== Battle of France and Britain ===
The Battle of France, the German invasion of France and the Low Countries, began on 10 May 1940. On 14 May 1940, Neuhoff claimed a Armée de l'Air (French Air Force) M.S.406 in the area near Sedan. Four days later, 7. Staffel engaged in aerial combat with eight French Curtiss P-36 Hawk fighter aircraft. In this encounter, the Staffel lost its Staffelkapitän, Wilcke, who was shot down and taken prisoner of war (POW) while Neuhoff claimed one of three Curtiss fighters shot down. During the French campaign, he had claimed seven aerial victories, eight in total, and had been awarded both classes of the Iron Cross (Eisernes Kreuz).

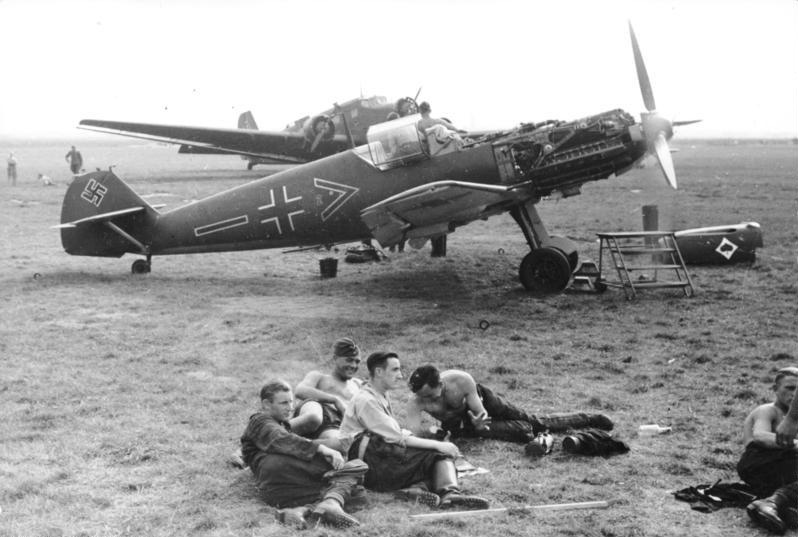
A Messerschmitt Bf 109 E-1 of JG 53, similar to those flown by Neuhoff

Following the Armistice of 22 June 1940, III. Gruppe moved to Rennes Airfield where they patrolled the costal area of Brittany. On 10 July, the Gruppe relocated to an airfield at Lanvéoc-Poulmic, sometimes referred to as Brest-South airfield. Here, they flew their first combat missions during the Battle of Britain on 11 August, escorting Junkers Ju 87 dive bombers attacking British shipping. On 24 August, III. Gruppe began its relocation from Brest to Le Touquet Airfield, near Étaples and Le Touquet in the Pas-de-Calais on the English Channel. The Gruppe stayed here until 19 December.

On 15 September, later dubbed Battle of Britain Day, Neuhoff claimed a Bristol Blenheim bomber shot down over the English Channel between Cap Gris-Nez and Le Touquet. The Royal Air Force (RAF) reported no Blenheim bomber lost that day. However, a newly introduced Bristol Beaufighter from No. 25 Squadron crashed near Biggin Hill. III. Gruppe was withdrawn from the Channel Front on 19 December and moved to Mönchengladbach. There, the Gruppe was replenished while the pilots were sent on a skiing holiday until late January 1941. They then received a full complement of Bf 109 F-2 aircraft. The pilots continued to train and familiarize themselves with this new aircraft before on 18 March, III. Gruppe was again ordered to the English Channel where they were based at Berck-sur-Mer.

=== Operation Barbarossa ===
On 8 June 1941, the bulk of JG 53's air elements moved via Jever, in northern Germany, to Mannheim-Sandhofen. There the aircraft were given a maintenance overhaul prior to moving east. On 12 June, III. Gruppe was ordered to transfer to a forward airfield at Sobolewo. On 21 June, the Geschwaderkommodore (wing commander) of JG 53 and its Gruppenkommandeure were summoned to nearby Suwałki, where Generalfeldmarschall (field marshal) Albert Kesselring gave the final instructions for the upcoming attack. Wilcke, who had been appointed Gruppenkommandeur of III. Gruppe on 12 August 1940, briefed his pilots that evening.

On 27 July, Neuhoff claimed his 20th aerial victory. III. Gruppe began returning to Germany in early October 1941. The air elements left the Soviet Union on 4 October, while the ground units were transported back by train to Mannheim on 13 October. Since 22 June 1941, III. Gruppe had claimed 769 aerial victories for the loss of 6 pilots killed, 7 missing in action, 2 captured and 12 wounded.

=== North Africa and Malta ===
After its return to Germany, III. Gruppe was deployed to the Mediterranean Theater. The ground elements of III. Gruppe arrived in Catania in Sicily on 28 November 1941 while the rest of the Gruppe arrived on 3 December. Three days later, III. Gruppe was ordered to move to Timimi in Libya. While deployed to North Africa, Neuhoff claimed four aerial victories over the desert.

III. Gruppe relocated back to Sicily on 17 December for operations in the siege of Malta. The island of Malta had a strategically important position in the Mediterranean Sea. With the opening of a new front in North Africa in mid-1940, British air and sea forces based on the island could attack Axis ships transporting vital supplies and reinforcements from Europe to North Africa. To counter this threat, the Luftwaffe and the Regia Aeronautica (Italian Royal Air Force) conducted bombing raids to neutralize the RAF defenses and the ports. On 18 March 1942, Neuhoff claimed a Hurricane fighter shot down. His opponent may have been Pilot Officer Chuck Lester or Sergeant George Mulloy, both pilots from No. 185 Squadron. Two days later, Neuhoff claimed his 39th aerial victory. The victory may have been over Pilot Officer Douglas Cecil Leggo, flying the Supermarine Spitfire AB337 from No. 249 Squadron, who was killed in action.

On 9 April, Neuhoff was transferred and appointed Staffelkapitän (squadron leader) of 6. Staffel of JG 53. He replaced Oberleutnant Otto Böhner who was transferred. The Staffel was subordinated to II. Gruppe of JG 53 headed by Hauptmann Walter Spies and based at Comiso Airfield, Sicily, and fighting in the siege of Malta. That day, Neuhoff claimed his 40th aerial victory in combat with Hurricane fighters from No. 229 Squadron, which lost one Hurricane with further aircraft sustaining battle damage. The next day, Neuhoff was shot down by a friendly Bf 109 near RAF Hal Far and Luqa over Malta on fighter escort mission for Junkers Ju 88 bombers. He bailed out of his Bf 109 F-4/Z (Werknummer 7375—factory number) and became a POW. In consequence, command of 6. Staffel was passed on to Oberleutnant Günther Hess. Initially, Flight Officer G. A. F. Buchanan from No. 249 Squadron was credited with shooting him down. Later, credit was given to Sergeant Garth Horricks from No. 185 Squadron. The returning pilots from JG 53 however believed that Neuhoff was shot down by Leutnant Werner Schow from 1. Staffel. While in captivity, Neuhoff was awarded the Knight's Cross of the Iron Cross (Ritterkreuz des Eisernen Kreuzes) on 16 June 1942 for his 40 aerial victories claimed. Later on 15 October, he was also awarded the German Cross in Gold (Deutsches Kreuz in Gold).

== Later life ==
Neuhoff died on 17 January 2006 at the age of 87 in Duisburg-Rheinhausen, Germany.

== Summary of career ==
=== Aerial victory claims ===
According to Obermaier, Neuhoff was credited with 40 aerial victories, 23 of which on Eastern Front and 17 on the Western Front, claimed in 452 combat mission on the. Mathews and Foreman, authors of Luftwaffe Aces — Biographies and Victory Claims, researched the German Federal Archives and found records for 38 aerial victories, plus one further unconfirmed claim. This figure of confirmed claims includes 22 aerial victories on the Eastern Front and 16 on the Western Front.

Chronicle of aerial victories
This and the – (dash) indicates unconfirmed aerial victory claims for which Neuhoff did not receive credit. This and the ? (question mark) indicates information discrepancies listed by Prien, Stemmer, Rodeike, Bock, Mathews and Foreman.
Claim	Date	Time	Type	Location	Claim	Date	Time	Type	Location
– 7. Staffel of Jagdgeschwader 53 – "Phoney War" — 26 September 1939 – 9 May 1940
1? (Note: According to Mathews and Foreman this claim is unconfirmed.)	2 March 1940	12:20	Hurricane	southwest of Diedenhofen					
– 7. Staffel of Jagdgeschwader 53 – Battle of France — 10 May – 25 June 1940
2	14 May 1940	10:30	M.S.406	Sedan	6	5 June 1940	07:50	Hurricane	Poix
3	18 May 1940	16:38	Curtiss	west of Laon	7	9 June 1940	10:15	Curtiss	Rethel-Attigny
4	27 May 1940	14:25	C.710	south of Creil	8	11 June 1940	12:03	MB.151	Reims-Épernay
5	3 June 1940	10:35	Curtiss	west of Creil					
– 7. Staffel of Jagdgeschwader 53 – Battle of Britain and on the English Channel — 26 June 1940 – 7 June 1941
9	15 September 1940	19:00	Blenheim	20 km (12 mi) northwest of Étaples	10	18 September 1940	10:55	Spitfire	Ashford
– 9. Staffel of Jagdgeschwader 53 – Operation Barbarossa — 22 June – 4 October 1941
11	22 June 1941	09:38	DI-6	southwest of Kalwarija	22	13 August 1941	06:05	DB-3? (Note: According to Mathews and Foreman claimed as a Polikarpov I-16.)	
12	22 June 1941	16:35	DB-3		23	22 August 1941	17:00	DB-3	
13	25 June 1941	10:50	DB-3		24	24 August 1941	16:15	DB-3	
14	25 June 1941	10:55	DB-3		25	27 August 1941	13:55	I-61 (MiG-3)	
15	25 June 1941	18:20	V-11 (Il-2)		26	30 August 1941	17:05	Pe-2	
16	26 June 1941	09:50? (Note: According to Mathews and Foreman claimed at 05:50.)	DB-3		27	30 August 1941	17:25	DB-3	
17	23 July 1941	13:30	I-18 (MiG-1)		28	31 August 1941	09:30	I-16	
18	25 July 1941	18:17	Pe-2		29	15 September 1941	10:05	I-16? (Note: According to Mathews and Foreman claimed as a Mikoyan-Gurevich MiG-1.)	
19	25 July 1941	18:25	Pe-2		30	19 September 1941	17:15	DB-3	
20	27 July 1941	08:05	DB-3		31	19 September 1941	17:19	I-18 (MiG-1)	
21	4 August 1941	18:15	DB-3		32	19 September 1941	17:20	DB-3	
– 7. Staffel of Jagdgeschwader 53 – Mediterranean Theater — 25 November 1941 – 8 April 1942
33	11 December 1941	11:30	Hurricane		37	1 March 1942	13:10	Hurricane	
34	12 December 1941? (Note: According to Mathews and Foreman claimed on 11 December 1941 after 11:00.)	16:00?	Hurricane		38	18 March 1942	17:30	Hurricane	
35	12 December 1941	16:10	P-40		39	20 March 1942	08:23	Spitfire	
36	14 December 1941	15:45	Hurricane						
– 6. Staffel of Jagdgeschwader 53 – Mediterranean Theater — 9–10 April 1942
— (Note: This unconfirmed claim is not listed by Mathews and Foreman.)	9 April 1942	—	Hurricane						

=== Awards ===
- Iron Cross (1939) 2nd and 1st Class
- Honor Goblet of the Luftwaffe (6 January 1941)
- Knight's Cross of the Iron Cross on 16 June 1942 as Leutnant and Staffelführer in the III./Jagdgeschwader 53 (Note: According to Scherzer on 19 June 1942 as Staffelführer of the 7./Jagdgeschwader 53.)
- German Cross in Gold on 15 October 1942 as Oberfeldwebel in the 7./Jagdgeschwader 53
