= Hans-Dieter Frank =

German fighter ace and Knight's Cross recipient

- Frank as a Hauptmann
- Born: 8 July 1919; Kiel
- Died: 28 September 1943 (aged 24); Hannover
- Cause of death: Killed in action
- Military career
- Allegiance: Nazi Germany
- Branch: Luftwaffe
- Service years: 1937–1943
- Rank: Major (Posthumously)
- Units: ZG 1 NJG 1
- Commands: 2./NJG 1, I./NJG 1
- Conflicts: World War II: Invasion of Poland; Battle of France; Defence of the Reich †
- Awards: Knight's Cross of the Iron Cross with Oak Leaves

Hans-Dieter Frank (8 July 1919 – 28 September 1943) was a German Luftwaffe military aviator during World War II, a night fighter ace credited with 55 aerial victories claimed in approximately 150 combat missions making him the seventeenth most successful night fighter pilot in the history of aerial warfare. All of his victories were claimed over the Western Front in Defense of the Reich missions against the Royal Air Force's (RAF) Bomber Command.

Born in Kiel, Frank grew up in the Weimar Republic and Nazi Germany. Following graduation from school, he joined the military service in 1937 and was trained as a pilot. Frank then served with Zerstörergeschwader 1 (ZG 1—1st Destroyer Wing), flying a Messerschmitt Bf 110 heavy fighter during the Invasion of Poland and Battle of France. In mid-1941, he transferred to Nachtjagdgeschwader 1 (NJG 1—1st Night Fighter Wing) where he became a night fighter pilot and claimed his first aerial victory on the night of 10/11 April 1941. Frank was appointed squadron leader of 2. Staffel (2nd squadron) of NJG 1 in August 1942. Following his 33rd aerial victory, he was awarded the Knight's Cross of the Iron Cross on 20 June 1943. On 1 July 1943, he was appointed group commander of I. Gruppe of NJG 1. Frank and his crew were killed in action in a mid-air collision with another German night fighter on the night of 27/28 September 1943. He was posthumously bestowed with the Knight's Cross of the Iron Cross with Oak Leaves and promoted to Major (major).

== Early life and career ==
Frank was born on 8 July 1919 in Kiel, which was then part of the Province of Schleswig-Holstein during the Weimar Republic. He was the son of a sales agent. After graduation from school and receipt of his Abitur (university entry qualification), Frank joined the Luftwaffe in 1937 as a Fahnenjunker (cadet). Following flight training, (Note: Flight training in the Luftwaffe progressed through the levels A1, A2 and B1, B2, referred to as A/B flight training. A training included theoretical and practical training in aerobatics, navigation, long-distance flights and dead-stick landings. The B courses included high-altitude flights, instrument flights, night landings and training to handle the aircraft in difficult situations. For pilots destined to fly multi-engine aircraft, the training was completed with the Luftwaffe Advanced Pilot's Certificate (Erweiterter Luftwaffen-Flugzeugführerschein), also known as the C-Certificate.) he was posted to Zerstörergeschwader 1 (ZG 1—1st Destroyer Wing).

== World War II ==
World War II in Europe began on Friday 1 September 1939 when German forces invaded Poland. Now a Leutnant (second lieutenant) with I. Gruppe (1st group) of ZG 1, Frank flew his first combat missions over Poland and during the Battle of France. On 22 June 1940, Nachtjagdgeschwader 1 (NJG 1—1st Night Fighter Wing) was created from I. Gruppe of ZG 1 and placed under the command of Hauptmann Wolfgang Falck. In consequence, Frank became a member of the night-fighter force.

=== Night fighter career ===
A map of part of the Kammhuber Line. The 'belt' and night fighter 'boxes' are shown.

Following the 1939 aerial Battle of the Heligoland Bight, Royal Air Force (RAF) attacks shifted to the cover of darkness, initiating the Defence of the Reich campaign. By mid-1940, Generalmajor (Brigadier General) Josef Kammhuber had established a night air defense system dubbed the Kammhuber Line. It consisted of a series of control sectors equipped with radars and searchlights and an associated night fighter. Each sector named a Himmelbett (canopy bed) would direct the night fighter into visual range with target bombers. In 1941, the Luftwaffe started equipping night fighters with airborne radar such as the Lichtenstein radar. This airborne radar did not come into general use until early 1942. On 25 August 1941, Frank became an ace after downing his 5th victim, Armstrong Whitworth Whitley, Z6505, MH-F, No. 51 Squadron RAF. Sergeant J. C. W. King and his crew were captured. He was appointed Staffelkapitän (squadron leader) of 2. Staffel of NJG 1 on 8 August 1942. On 27 November 1942, Frank was awarded the German Cross in Gold (Deutsches Kreuz in Gold).

Frank was decorated with the Knight's Cross of the Iron Cross (Ritterkreuz des Eisernen Kreuzes) on 20 June 1943, the nomination had been submitted for 33 aerial victories claimed. The presentation was made by Generalmajor Kammhuber. On the night of 21/22 June, RAF Bomber Command sent 705 aircraft on a mission to bomb Krefeld, losing 44 aircraft in the attack. That night, Frank claimed six victories in the early hours, making him an "ace-in-a-day". One of the bombers he shot down was Handley Page Halifax HR848, which was one of 19 No. 35 Squadron RAF aircraft detailed to attack Krefeld on the night of the 21/22 June. Flight Sergeant R. J. Quigley and two of his crew were captured and the remaining four perished. Another was HR735 operated by No. 158 Squadron RAF. Pilot Officer C. H. Robinson DFC RNZAF and his six crew were killed. A third, BB375, flown by German-Canadian Sergeant C. C. Reichert RCAF, No. 408 Squadron RAF, crashed with all but one crewman killed. Further victories included an Avro Lancaster bomber from No. 100 Squadron RAF near Dinther, and two Halifax bombers from 408 (Goose) Squadron near Zeist and Lopik.

On 24/25 June Sergeant Robert Whitfield's Halifax JD258, VR-K borrowed from No. 419 Bomber Squadron RCAF, but operated by a No. 428 Squadron RAF crew, became Frank's 41st aerial victory. All of the crew died. The aircraft was on a mission to bomb Elberfeld, a municipal of Wuppertal. Frank's last victory in June 1943 occurred on day twenty-nine when he shot down his 44th victim; Lancaster bomber ED362, HW-E, flown by Pilot Officer J. P. Pascoe RCAF, No. 100 Squadron RAF. Pascoe and all but one of his crew were killed (Sergeant R. G Storr was taken prisoner). That night, RAF Bomber Command was targeting Cologne.

=== Group commander ===
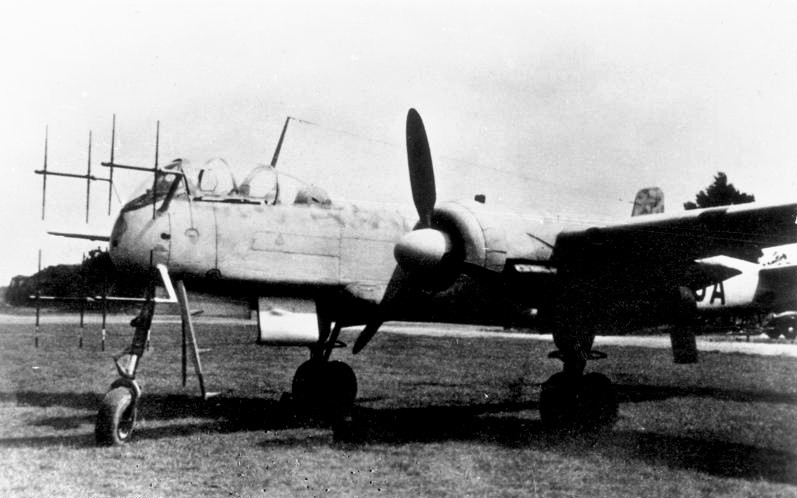
Heinkel He 219

On 1 July 1943, Frank was appointed Gruppenkommandeur (group commander) of I. Gruppe of NJG 1, succeeding Major Werner Streib. Operating from Venlo Airfield, Frank claimed his first aerial victory as Gruppenkommandeur on the night of 9/10 July when he attacked Lancaster bomber W4763 from No. 61 Squadron RAF which crashed near Overdinkel in the Netherlands. Four nights later, he shot down a Halifax bomber from No. 401 Squadron RCAF and another Halifax bomber from No. XXXV (Madras Presidency) Squadron. Frank claimed his first aerial victories flying the Heinkel He 219 night fighter of the night of 25/26 July when claimed two aerial victories, a Lancaster bomber from No. 50 Squadron RAF and a Wellington bomber from 429 (Bomber) Squadron RCAF. When on the night 30/31 August 660 bombers targeted both Mönchengladbach and Rheydt, Frank was credited with the destruction of three bombers. His aerial victories included a Short Stirling bomber over Mönchengladbach, the Vickers Wellington bomber JA118 from the Royal Canadian Air Force No. 432 Squadron RCAF, and a Lancaster bomber which crashed near Brüggen.

Frank and his radio operator Oberfeldwebel Erich Gotter were killed following a mid-air collision with another German night fighter northwest of Celle in the night of 28/29 September 1943. Their He 219 A-0 (Werknummer 190055—factory number) "G9+CB" had collided with a Bf 110 G-4 of the Geschwaderstab (headquarters unit) of NJG 1 during the landing approach. Frank had escaped the aircraft using the ejection seat but forgot to release his radio-cable. He landed safely but was strangled by the radio-cable. The three man crew of the Bf 110 G-4, pilot Hauptmann Günther Friedrich, radio operator Oberleutnant Werner Gerber and flight engineer Obergefreiter Kurt Weißke, were also killed in the accident. This collision was likely caused by an attack made on his fighter by RAF night fighter ace Bob Braham. On 2 March 1944, Frank was posthumously awarded the Knight's Cross of the Iron Cross with Oak Leaves (Ritterkreuz des Eisernen Kreuzes mit Eichenlaub), the 417th officer or soldier of the Wehrmacht so honored. Posthumously, he was also promoted to Major (major). He was succeeded by Hauptmann Manfred Meurer as commander of I. Gruppe of NJG 1.

== Summary of career ==
=== Aerial victory claims ===
According to US historian David T. Zabecki, Frank was credited with 55 aerial victories. Obermaier lists him with 55 nocturnal aerial victories claimed in 328 combat missions. Foreman, Parry and Mathews, authors of Luftwaffe Night Fighter Claims 1939 – 1945, researched the German Federal Archives and found records for 54 nocturnal victory claims Mathews and Foreman also published Luftwaffe Aces — Biographies and Victory Claims, listing Frank with 51 claims.

Chronicle of aerial victories
This and the ♠ (Ace of spades) indicates those aerial victories which made Frank an "ace-in-a-day", a term which designates a fighter pilot who has shot down five or more airplanes in a single day. This and the ! (exclamation mark) indicates aerial victories listed in Luftwaffe Night Fighter Claims 1939 – 1945 but not in Luftwaffe Aces — Biographies and Victory Claims.
Claim	Date	Time	Type	Location	Serial No./Squadron No.
– I. Gruppe of Nachtjagdgeschwader 1 –
1	10 April 1941	23:32	Hampden	2 km (1.2 mi) southwest of Neeroeteren	Hampden X3066/No. 144 Squadron RAF
2	12 June 1941	02:13	Whitley	vicinity of Eindhoven	
3	17 August 1941	02:15	Wellington	10 km (6.2 mi) northwest of Roermond	
4	17 August 1941	02:40	Whitley	2 km (1.2 mi) north of Venlo	Whitley Z6794/No. 10 Squadron RAF
5	25 August 1941	01:15	Whitley	3 km (1.9 mi) east of Weert	Whitley Z6505/No. 51 Squadron RAF
– 2. Staffel of Nachtjagdgeschwader 1 –
6	27 December 1941	21:25	Whitley		
7	13 April 1942	01:53	Wellington	north of Maarheeze	Wellington Z1213/No. 300 Polish Bomber Squadron
8!	31 May 1942	01:30	Wellington	west of Maarheeze	
9	26 July 1942	02:14	Halifax	north of Venlo	Halifax W1211/No. 158 Squadron RAF
10	6 August 1942	00:17	Halifax	northwest of Posterholt	Halifax W1180/No. 78 Squadron RAF
11	27 August 1942	23:25	Wellington	10 km (6.2 mi) north of Helmond	Wellington Z1613/No. 156 Squadron RAF
12	1 October 1942	21:34	Stirling	10 km (6.2 mi) northwest of Venlo	
13	1 October 1942	22:30	Wellington	Volkel Air Base	
14	15 October 1942	22:05	Wellington	10 km (6.2 mi) southwest of Arnhem	Wellington BK270/No. 419 Bomber Squadron RCAF
15	15 October 1942	22:31	Stirling	15 km (9.3 mi) northeast of 's-Hertogenbosch	Lancaster W4195/No. 106 Squadron RAF
16	15 October 1942	22:56	Stirling	10 km (6.2 mi) west of Breda	Stirling R9146/No. 214 Squadron RAF
17	17 January 1943	22:24	Lancaster	10 km (6.2 mi) west of IJmuiden	
18	2 February 1943	22:01	Stirling	12 km (7.5 mi) east-southeast of Rotterdamn	Stirling R9264/No. 7 Squadron RAF
19	3 April 1943	22:45	Halifax	5 km (3.1 mi) southeast of Rhenen, Arnhem	Halifax JB866/408 (Goose) Squadron
20	3 April 1943	23:02	Lancaster	4 km (2.5 mi) north of Kleve	
21	3 April 1943	23:25	Stirling	3 km (1.9 mi) southwest of Den Haag	Halifax W7937/No. 78 Squadron RAF
22	9 April 1943	23:46	Lancaster		Lancaster ED502/No. 9 Squadron RAF
23	27 April 1943	03:15	Wellington	3 km (1.9 mi) west of Brakel	Wellington HE168/No. 196 Squadron RAF
24	27 April 1943	03:37	Wellington	5 km (3.1 mi) west of Dougen	Wellington HE693/No. 420 Squadron RCAF
25	5 May 1943	01:47	Stirling	west of Zandvoort	Stirling BK782/No. 15 Squadron RAF
26	5 May 1943	02:16	Wellington	20 km (12 mi) south of Amsterdam	Wellington HE727/No. 428 Squadron RCAF
27	5 May 1943	02:38	Wellington	Werkendam	Wellington HE244/No. 166 Squadron RAF
28	13 May 1943	02:21	Wellington	15 km (9.3 mi) northwest of Ereda	Wellington HE423/429 (Bomber) Squadron RCAF
29	13 May 1943	03:39	Stirling	Rotterdam	Stirling EF357/No. 149 Squadron RAF
30	14 May 1943	02:02	Wellington	Hilversum	
31	14 May 1943	02:53	Wellington	10 km (6.2 mi) northwest of Hilversum	Wellington HE697/No. 426 (Thunderbirds) Squadron RCAF
32	15 June 1943	00:59	Lancaster	14 km (8.7 mi) southeast of 's-Hertogenbosch	Lancaster ED980/No. 619 Squadron RAF
33	15 June 1943	01:13	Lancaster	1 km (0.62 mi) south of Hien	Lancaster ED434/No. 49 Squadron RAF
34	15 June 1943	02:20	Lancaster	vicinity of Amsterdam	Lancaster DV160/No. 460 Squadron RAAF
35♠	22 June 1943	01:23	Lancaster	36 km (22 mi) northeast of Hien	Lancaster ED556/No. 100 Squadron RAF
36♠	22 June 1943	01:37	Halifax	0.5 km (0.31 mi) east of Kaalhoven	Halifax HR735/No. 158 Squadron RAF
37♠	22 June 1943	01:48	Halifax	1 km (0.62 mi) west of Vechel	
38♠	22 June 1943	02:09	Halifax	4 km (2.5 mi) northwest of Boxtel	Halifax JD205/No. 77 Squadron RAF
39♠	22 June 1943	02:24	Halifax	2 km (1.2 mi) southwest of Zeist	Halifax DT772/408 (Goose) Squadron
40♠	22 June 1943	02:30	Halifax	0.5 km (0.31 mi) north of Yaarsfeld	Halifax BB375/408 (Goose) Squadron
41	25 June 1943	01:05	Halifax	Acht	Halifax JD258/No. 419 Bomber Squadron RCAF
42	26 June 1943	02:17	Wellington	14 km (8.7 mi) west-northwest of Gouda	Wellington HE412/No. 196 Squadron RAF
43	26 June 1943	02:37	Wellington	11 km (6.8 mi) east-northeast of Gouda	Wellington HF589/No. 166 Squadron RAF
44	29 June 1943	02:47	Lancaster	12 km (7.5 mi) southeast of Rotterdam	Lancaster ED362/No. 100 Squadron RAF
– I. Gruppe of Nachtjagdgeschwader 1 –
45	10 July 1943	01:22	Lancaster	8 km (5.0 mi) east-northeast of Enschede	Lancaster W4763/No. 61 Squadron RAF
46	14 July 1943	01:26	Halifax	1 km (0.62 mi) south of Helmond	Halifax HR905/No. 401 Squadron RCAF
47	14 July 1943	01:39	Halifax	north of Leuith	Halifax HR819/No. XXXV (Madras Presidency) Squadron
48	26 July 1943	00:56	Lancaster	10 km (6.2 mi) southeast of Nijmegen	Lancaster ED753/No. 50 Squadron RAF
49	26 July 1943	01:30	Wellington	0.5 km (0.31 mi) south of Culemborg	Wellington HE803/429 (Bomber) Squadron RCAF
50	23 August 1943	23:40	Lancaster	7 km (4.3 mi) southeast of Emmen	Lancaster ED550/No. 207 Squadron RAF
51	31 August 1943	03:18	Stirling	Mönchengladbach	Stirling EF438/No. 149 Squadron RAF
52	31 August 1943	03:30	Wellington	Siggerath	Wellington JA118/No. 432 Squadron RCAF
53	31 August 1943	03:35	Lancaster	Brüggen	Lancaster JA936/No. 9 Squadron RAF
54	6 September 1943	00:15	Lancaster	northeast of Pirmasens	Lancaster JB133/No. 619 Squadron RAF (Note: According to the Aviation Safety Network, potentially claimed by Hauptmann Heinrich Wohlers.)

=== Awards ===
- Honour Goblet of the Luftwaffe on 19 October 1942 as Oberleutnant and pilot
- German Cross in Gold on 27 November 1942 as Oberleutnant in the 2./Nachtjagdgeschwader 1
- Knight's Cross of the Iron Cross with Oak Leaves
  - Knight's Cross on 20 June 1943 as Hauptmann and Staffelkapitän of the 2./Nachtjagdgeschwader 1
  - 417th Oak Leaves on 2 March 1944 as Hauptmann and Gruppenkommandeur of the I./Nachtjagdgeschwader 1

== Notes ==
Military offices
Preceded by Major Werner Streib	Commander of I. Nachtjagdgeschwader 1; 1 July 1943 – 22 September 1943	Succeeded by Hauptmann Manfred Meurer
