= Nachtjagdgeschwader 1 =

- Unit crest, adopted from ZG 76
- Active: 22 June 1940 – 8 May 1945
- Country: Nazi Germany
- Branch: Luftwaffe
- Type: Night Fighter
- Role: Anti-aircraft warfare Air superiority Offensive counter air
- Size: Wing
- Engagements: World War II

Commanders
- Notable commanders: Wolfgang Falck; Werner Streib; Hans-Joachim Jabs

Insignia
- Identification symbol: Geschwaderkennung of G9

Aircraft flown
- Fighter: Messerschmitt Bf 109; Dornier Do 17; Messerschmitt Bf 110; Junkers Ju 88; Heinkel He 219; Dornier Do 217

Nachtjagdgeschwader 1 (NJG 1) was a German Luftwaffe night fighter-wing of World War II. NJG 1 was formed on 22 June 1940 and comprised four Gruppen (groups). NJG 1 was created as an air defence unit for the Defence of the Reich campaign; an aerial war waged by the Luftwaffe against the bombing of the German Reich by RAF Bomber Command and the United States Army Air Force. In 1941 airborne radar was introduced with radar operators, and standardised in 1942 and 1943. Consequently, a large number of German night fighter aces existed within NJG 1.

NJG 1 operated all of the major twin-engine night fighters produced by German industry during the war. It fought in notable campaigns, such as the Battle of the Ruhr and Battle of Berlin. By the end of the war, lack of fuel, technical setbacks, lack of training and advances by the Allied powers rendered the Luftwaffe night force ineffective from August 1944 until the end of the war in May 1945. NJG 1 was the most successful night fighter wing and had claimed some 2,311 victories by day and night, for some 676 aircrew killed in action.

== Background ==
Night fighter operations did not feature in Wehrmacht war games during 1935 and 1936. Little of the Luftwaffe Service Regulation No. 16 concerned night fighting save for Section 253, which called for night fighting zones to be established for night fighters and anti-aircraft artillery to avoid each other. Search lights were to be used in support of the pilots. Section 253 concluded that any hindrance to offensive air forces caused by "restrictive measures" was to be avoided. The prevailing attitude to night fighting left commanders to carry out research on their own; the first occurred in Berlin, by Luftkreiskommando II from May to November 1936. Oberkommando der Luftwaffe ordered experiments with searchlights and aircraft from the summer of 1937. In 1939 several night fighter Staffeln (squadrons or flights) had been established; all of the Staffeln had been converted back to day fighter units by 16 August 1939.

The German invasion of Poland in September 1939 began the Second World War. The French Air Force and RAF Bomber Command began bombing raids on German ports and shipping. The Battle of the Heligoland Bight in December 1939 ended massed Royal Air Force (RAF) daylight operations until 1944. Bomber Command persisted in night operations against Germany, which extended to German towns and cities from 10/11 May 1940. The Armistice of 22 June 1940 after the Battle of France did not end the threat posed by British air power. Wolfgang Falck had commanded I/ZG 1 during the German invasion of Denmark. Immediately after the occupation, Bomber Command appeared frequently to attack German positions and Falck was able to fly interceptions at dusk. Falck was sure that a Messerschmitt Bf 110 unit could defend the airspace at night with assistance from radar operators. Falck was invited to the Air Ministry (Reichsluftfahrtministerium) to express his views to Albert Kesselring, Ernst Udet and Erhard Milch. Hermann Göring, the commander-in-chief of the Luftwaffe, ordered Falck to create a Nachtjagdgeschwader at Düsseldorf on 22 June 1940.

Falck concluded that night fighting could not be organised and operated by one wing and Josef Kammhuber formed the Night Fighter Division. Radar, searchlights and anti-aircraft artillery were coordinated under this organisation from 17 July 1940. On 23 July the headquarters was established at Brussels, in occupied Belgium. On 1 August 1940 a command post was established at Zeist near Utrecht in the occupied Netherlands. The Zerstörer (destroyer, heavy fighter) pilots and units were used for conversion to night fighters. No night fighter training schools existed in 1940, until blind-flying schools were established at Schleißheim from 1941. Kammhuber established the Kammhuber Line, which used radar to guide night fighters to RAF bombers.

=== Formation ===
I Gruppe was formed on 22 June 1940 from elements of I. Gruppe of Zerstörergeschwader 1 (ZG 1) and IV. Gruppe of Zerstörergeschwader 26 (ZG 26). II. Gruppe was formed from IV.(N) Gruppe of Jagdgeschwader 2 on 1 July 1940, although the Gruppe was renamed III./NJG 1. The second formation occurred the same date, 1 July, from renaming Z./Kampfgeschwader 30 (Zerstörer/KG 30). On 7 September 1940 this Gruppe was renamed I./Nachtjagdgeschwader 2 (NJG 2), though it received personnel from I./ZG 26. III. Gruppe was raised on 1 July also, from II./NJG 1. IV./NJG 1 was raised on 1 October 1942 from elements of II./NJG 2. Falck became the first Geschwaderkommodore. Hauptmann Günther Radusch, took command of I./NJG 1, Major Walter Ehle, became the first permanent commander of II./NJG 1, Hauptmann Philipp von Bothmer and Major Helmut Lent took command of III. and IV./NJG 1 respectively.

I./NJG 1 set up base at Venlo Airfield, where it remained from 18 March 1941 to 5 September 1944, 18,000 workers laboured on the site, which measured 1,180 ha (2,900 acres). The two take-off runways were 1,450 m (4,760 ft) long, and a third 1,200 m (3,900 ft) in length. 2,000 lamps were used for lighting and 48 km (30 mi) of roads led to workshops, command posts, and accommodation. The formation of the night fighter wings brought together different kinds of pilots with different preferences. The crews of II./NJG 1, which were formed from Z/KG 30, preferred the Junkers Ju 88, Dornier Do 17 and Dornier Do 217, which were regarded by Bf 110 pilots as "lame ducks" unsuitable for the role. These pilots preferred other qualities not prevalent in Zerstörer aircraft; spacious cockpits, a third man to act as lookout, longer endurance, autopilot and more powerful armament. These pilots, in some cases, were advanced in years for a military aviator, often they were former Luft Hansa pilots. These men did not adapt easily to the concept of controlled night fighting. Werner Baake and Rudolf Schoenert were examples of the ex-Luft Hansa pilots that joined the Luftwaffe in 1941. II./NJG 1 was equipped with the Ju 88 C and Do 17 Z-10 in 1940.

== World War II ==
In the autumn, 1940 the Luftwaffe began long-range intruder operations (Fernnachtjagd) to forestall the increasing number of Bomber Command raids. The Luftwaffe signalling service were able to determine when Bomber Command operations were going to begin. Night fighters were ordered to patrol the German coast, fly to known Bomber Command bases and follow the bombers back to England along known routes. I./NJG 2 became the sole intruder unit for this type of operation, but the results were costly. The wing lost 32 aircrew killed in action and 12 aircraft lost in exchange for 18 RAF claimed shot down. Over Europe, the German defences were limited in 1941. The Nazi propaganda machine dismissed RAF bombers as "tired old cows", but the limited range of the precise Würzburg radar, and the inability to distinguish friend from foe, left the Luftwaffe at a disadvantage. The Helle Nachtjagd (illuminated night fighting) belt, which provided three radars per searchlight battery, covered the area from the Danish border to Maubeuge, and could detect bombers entering and exiting the zone with great accuracy, but RAF bomber pilots learned to dive upon departing the belt, accelerate past the search light batteries at low-altitudes and escape the most hazardous part of the defence zone. The system bore the burden of the defensive battles in 1941. In 1942, the introduction of the Handley-Page Halifax and Avro Lancaster would produce further problems. The bombers could outrun a Bf 110C or D in a shallow dive and at altitudes of over 5,000 m (16,000 ft). German pilots would have to detect the bomber early in order to be able to dive from much greater heights. The introduction of newer radar variants, such as the Freya radar, eventually improved the range and identification problems prevalent in 1941.

In mid-1940, the Stab/NJG 1 was based at Düsseldorf and Deelen under Falck and equipped with three Bf 110Bs. At Bönninghardt, I./NJG 1 mustered 34 Bf 110Cs and Ds with 22 operational. At Düsseldorf, II./NJG 1 could field 11 Ju 88Cs, four operational, and 10 Do 17Zs, nine operational. At Cologne, III/NJG 1 still operated the Messerschmitt Bf 109; 13 Bf 109Cs, four operational, three Bf 109 Ds and one combat ready, 17 Bf 109 Es were present with all but one operational. On the night of 19/20 July, Werner Streib, 2./NJG 1, claimed one of the first aerial victories for NJG 1; an Armstrong Whitworth Whitley shot down at 02:15 near Saerbeck. Streib would become Gruppenkommandeur II./NJG 1 only two months later. Oberfeldwebel Föster of 8./NJG 1 was given the distinction of the first NJG 1 air victory on the night of the 9 July 1940. At this time, NJG 1 was experimenting in night interceptions using their Bf 110s and Do 17s with the support of a single searchlight regiment. Only 42 British bombers were claimed shot down in 1940 by German night fighters. I. and II./NJG 1 experienced difficulties in locating bombers in 1940 and their failures encouraged Kammhuber to introduce tighter control-based tactics for night fighters, searchlight batteries and radar. The night fighters were guided to a light and radio beacon located behind an "illuminated belt" of searchlights. Once a bomber was detected the night fighter flew into the belt, turned behind the bomber and engaged in combat. Würzburg radars were required for the intercept; one to track the fighter, while the other focused on the bomber in order to coordinate the searchlight. The Himmelbett (canopy bed) replaced this system in 1941. The system remained the same, but the accurate, long-range Freya was introduced to maintain overall surveillance and often could bring the radar-less night fighters into visual range of the bomber.

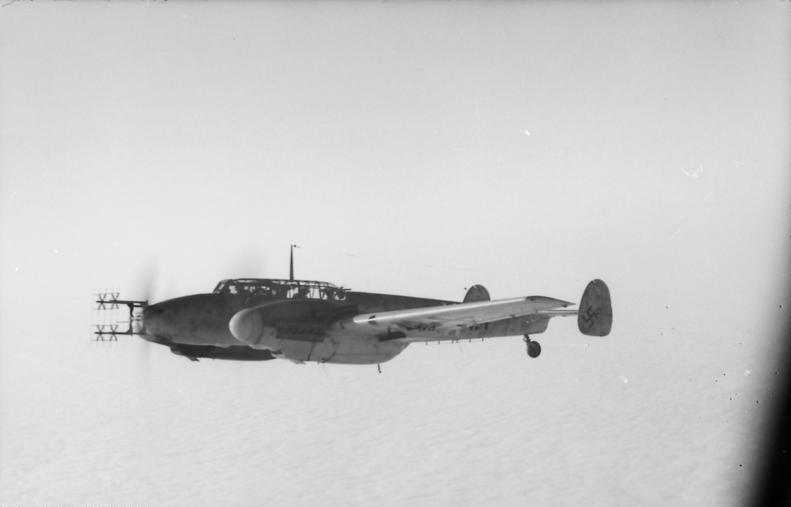
Bf 110 G night fighter with radar. The BF 110 was the mainstay of NJG 1.

In mid-1941, NJG 1 began experimenting with Lichtenstein radar, which had become operational. Ludwig Becker shot down six RAF bombers while flying a radar-installed Dornier Do 215 B-5 between 10 August and 30 September 1941. The only Lichtenstein radar in service then became unserviceable for the next successes were not recorded until June 1942. Lichtenstein was in short supply until mid-1943, at which time 80 percent of night fighters had it. I./NJG 1 and II./NJG 2 were given priority for it because they shielded the approaches to the Ruhr. The first Ju 88C fighters, equipped with radar were delivered to II./NJG 1 at Leeuwarden in February 1942. Only four sets arrived and it took several weeks for them to become operational. The crews soon came to appreciate the device and were eager to secure it for their aircraft. Other platforms were tested in NJG 1 at this time. In March 1942 the Dornier Do 217 J was also tested by NJG 1; however the lack of performance made the type unpopular with crews.

Becker developed his own tactics for attacking a bomber. He stalked the aircraft from the stern, just below the height shown on the radar. After sighting the bomber, he dived and accelerated to avoid being spotted by the tail gunner. Once underneath the enemy, Becker reduced the throttle and matched the speed of the unsuspecting pilot. Becker then climbed steadily to 50 m (160 ft) from below the target before he pulled up and opened fire. The Do 215 would then lose speed allowing the bomber to fly ahead and expose itself to a stream of shells. With this method, the gun sight was rarely needed. These tactics were adopted by the night fighter force. Streib claimed 22 aerial victories in 1941, making him the most successful night fighter pilot of the year. Paul Gildner claimed 21, and Lent claimed 20, making him the third highest claimant in the Luftwaffe that year. Radusch, who spent several days commanding I./NJG 1 in 1940 during its formation, claimed 13. At the end of 1941 Heinz-Wolfgang Schnaufer joined the wing and became the most successful night fighter pilot in history, with 121 claims.

In February 1942, Air Marshall Arthur Harris became Air Officer Commanding Bomber Command. Harris became the driving force behind producing a powerful heavy bomber command to carry out his area bombing operations. The attacks on Lübeck in March and Cologne in May 1942 began the new phase in the Defence of the Reich. Over Lübeck, NJG 1 claimed only one bomber from seven claimed. NJG 1 claimed 21 bombers during the latter attack on Cologne on 30/31 May 1942 from the 32 claimed by German night fighter units. 41 bombers were lost. One of the wing's first losses was Helmut Woltersdorf, killed in June 1942 against an RAF night fighter.

Bomber Command began routine 1,000-bomber raids over Germany from 30 May to 17 August 1942 using the bomber stream to swamp the Kammhuber Line. From August 1942, Bomber Command began introducing new navigation aids for its air fleets. On 31 December 1942, Bomber Command utilised pathfinder de Havilland Mosquitos and Lancaster bombers equipped with OBOE on a test raid to Düsseldorf. Knacke made the last NJG 1 claim of the year against the latter type. 1942 proved to be successful in a tactical sense for German night fighters. Lent led the claims for the year with 42, Reinhold Knacke claimed 40, as did Becker while Gildner claimed 38. On the night of the 16/17 September 1942 Knacke became the first night fighter to claim ace in a day status when he claimed five bombers. 1942 ended in a lack of success. Weather, a fall in enemy activity and jamming of German radar caused limited interceptions. II./NJG 1's diary records that in 64 sorties from September 1942 through October, a victory was achieved only every tenth mission; two night fighters were lost. A period of "fruitless" operations began.

=== Battle of the Ruhr, Hamburg and Peenemünde ===
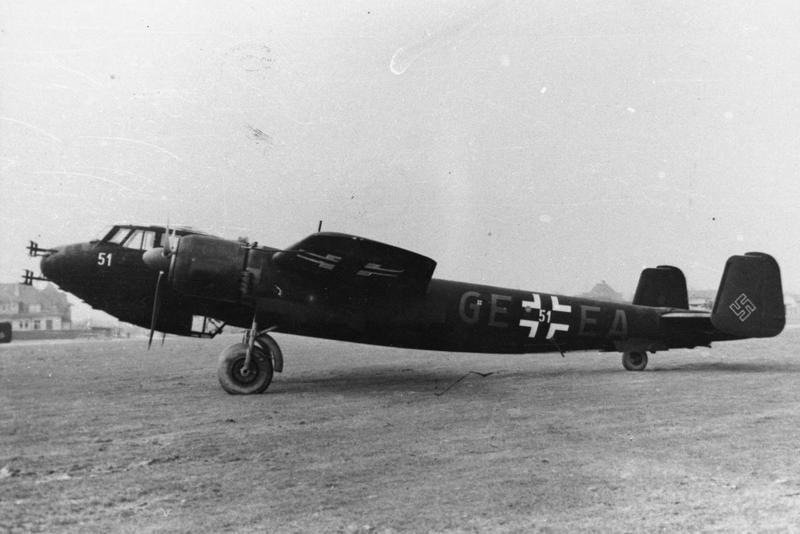
Do 217 J night fighter. A handful saw service with NJG 1.

In February 1943, several of the Experten were killed. Knacke was killed on day three. Becker was killed in action on a rare daylight interception against the United States Army Air Force (USAAF) Eighth Air Force. Becker followed Gildner, killed two days before him. As the older aces were killed, Johannes Hager, who would go on to achieve 48 aerial victories joined NJG 1 in February 1943. In March 1943, Harris began his first concerted military campaign against a specific objective, known as the Battle of the Ruhr. Harris had 53 squadrons for the battle, and his pathfinders were now operating the H2S ground-mapping radar. The Air Marshal felt he had sufficient resources for a long offensive against the German industrial region. On 5 March 1943, Falck led the command Staffel from Deelen, Streib commanded I. Gruppe from Venlo, Thimmig, III. Gruppe from Leeuwarden and IV. Gruppe from Twente; all operated the Bf 110. II. Gruppe under Ehler at Sint-Truiden operated the Bf 110 and Do 217.

On the first night, 5/6 March 1943, NJG 1 claimed 10 bombers destroyed. Among the claimants were fighter pilots Manfred Meurer, Herbert Lütje, Heinz Vinke and Lent all claimed. On 12/13 March NJG 1 claimed 13, and repeated this again on 29/30 March. On 3/4 April the wing claimed 17. The success was not repeated until 27/28 April when its pilots submitted 10 claims. On 4/5 May NJG 1 claimed 24 bombers destroyed and was the only Luftwaffe unit to report any successes that night. Among the pilots was Hans-Dieter Frank who would claim 55 aerial victories and briefly command I./NJG 1 before his death in a collision with a colleague while flying a Heinkel He 219. The collision may have been caused by an attack on his fighter by Wing Commander Bob Braham. On 12/13 May the wing claimed 25, and on 13/14 May the pilots claimed another 26. On 23/24 May a further 23 were claimed. The attacks on Dortmund that night cost Bomber Command 38 aircraft. Over the next six days 58 bombers were claimed by the night of the 30/31 May. The operation against Wuppertal on 29/30 May cost the British 33 aircraft. 211 RAF bombers were claimed by NJG 1 in June 1943. Total British losses were 277 for the month to all causes. During the campaign NJG 1 was able to engage Bomber Command consistently. On one night the wing scrambled 50 night fighters, only one-sixth of the Luftwaffe force. Committal of further crews was not possible in the Kammhuber system which required rigid allocation of units to specific points on the line. Dietrich Schmidt emerged as another NJG 1 "expert" during the Ruhr campaign, claiming his first successes which reached 43 by March 1945.

The Nazi Reich Ministry of Public Enlightenment and Propaganda, Joseph Goebbels, wrote in his diary on 14 May 1943 of German defences,

during the night there was another exceptionally heavy raid on Duisburg.... An unspeakable sorrow and great distress has come to the sorely tired city. Our technical development as regards submarine missions and air warfare is far inferior to that of the English and Americans. During the past five months the enemy has had the upper hand, almost everywhere he is defeating us in the air.

By the time the Ruhr campaign ended Bomber Command had suffered heavy losses to German night fighters and anti-aircraft defences. 1,099 were lost to all causes. The Luftwaffe's defences were unable to prevent Bomber Command from severely disrupting German production. Steel production fell by 200,000 tons and the armaments industry was facing a steel shortfall of 400,000 tons. After doubling production in 1942, production of steel increased only by 20 percent in 1943. Adolf Hitler and his armaments minister Albert Speer were forced to cut planned increases in production. This disruption caused the Zulieferungskrise (sub-components crisis). The increase of aircraft production for the Luftwaffe also came to an abrupt halt. Monthly production failed to increase between July 1943 and March 1944. Adam Tooze concludes; "Bomber Command had stopped Speer's armaments miracle in its tracks". Production of locomotives halted after March 1943 in the Ruhr along with ammunition fuses. Over 100,000 people were dehoused in Essen, contributing to the inability to continue production at the Krupp plant.

Luftwaffe night-fighter pilots experienced the presence of long-range RAF night fighting aircraft for the first time over Germany. Radar-installed Bristol Beaufighters and Mosquitos provided indirect fighter escort to Bomber Command over the Ruhr. These crews came from Fighter Command, and termed their operations "flower" sorties. These tactics required RAF pilots to fly to German night fighter airfields and patrol them to destroy Luftwaffe night fighters, as they got airborne or landed. These operations were successful and accounted for several German aircraft losses in June. On 14 and 25 June 1943, NJG 1 lost one and two Bf 110s to RAF night fighters. In August 1943, Bomber Command's Operation Hydra against Peenemünde. Wing Commander Braham engaged two NJG 1 crews, the 15-victory ace Georg Kraft and another fighter ace Heinz Vinke and shot them both down, killing the former and wounding the latter. Two other crews were lost on the operation. A development of the raid was the recorded entry into II./NJG 1 war diary that it was to be converted to Wilde Sau (Wild Boar) operations—the use of radar-less Focke-Wulf Fw 190 and Bf 109 single-engine fighters piloted by experienced night flyers to attack bombers but this became the domain of Jagdgeschwader 300. The Chief of Oberkommando der Luftwaffe, Hans Jeschonnek purportedly committed suicide because of the failure of the German night defences.

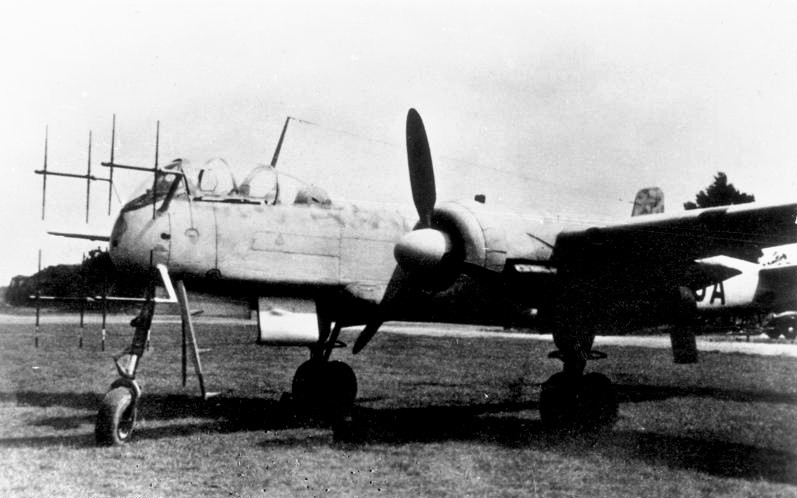
He 219 night fighter. Werner Baake flew these successfully exclusively in I./NJG 1.

On 24 July 1943, days after the end of the Ruhr campaign, Harris ordered Operation Gomorrah, an attack on Hamburg. The objective was to disrupt or end U-boat production in the port city. The introduction of "Window" blew a hole in German radar coverage and the bomber streams, aided by OBOE and H2S radar were able to penetrate the defences to devastate the centre of the city. The Himmelbett (canopy bed) system of radar-controlled night fighters slipping into the bomber stream and then using its own radar to pick out and engage individual bombers had gone. The effects of the raid, and the realisation German radar was temporarily blinded, led to the widespread use of the Wild Boar tactics over the summer, 1943. 791 bombers hit the city. German air defences accounted for only 1.5 percent of the attacking force. The Nazi leadership was shaken, and Kammhuber, who resisted calls to abandon the advanced Himmelbett system, was compelled to find technical solutions to the jamming of Freya, Liechtenstein and Würzburg radars. Kammhuber regarded the Wild Boar solution as an emergency measure only. NJG 1 claimed only three from a total of 12 claimed by night fighter pilots in defence of the city—Nachtjagdgeschwader 3 claimed the rest. August Geiger claimed two [Geiger became another notable victim of Braham in September 1943].

In August Zahme Sau (Tame Boar) tactics were used to some effect. Viktor von Loßberg's idea was for night fighters equipped with experimental SN-2 radar to cooperate with Y-control systems and "sluice" them into the bomber stream. Once there, the night fighters were ordered to transmit direction-finding signals to attract other night fighters. While semi-unguided, the radar operators and night fighter command retained some control over operations with success in August; amounting to 250 aircraft claimed shot down on all fronts. The success was offset by losses of 40 killed in the night fighter arm, with only 28 replacements in August. 61 twin-engine night fighters were lost during the month, but only 59 were replaced. As one German historian noted, the advent of the frequent Mosquito intruder operations from October "no airfield in Central Germany was safe." NJG 1 were engaged in daylight operations against the USAAF in August. Elements of the wing engaged the Eighth Air Force during the Schweinfurt–Regensburg mission with some success. 15 crews of II./NJG 1 were committed to battle, and they claimed seven B-17 Flying Fortress bombers but suffered damage to all of the Bf 110s sent on the interception. Four Bf 110s were shot down by return fire and an encounter with P-47 Thunderbolts of the US 56th Fighter Group. 21 night fighters were destroyed during this operation alone, removing them from the Peenemünde operation that night. NJG 1 were forced to engage USAAF heavy bombers until the end of January 1944; though IV./NJG 1 flew interceptions on 4 February.

On 5 October 1943, NJG 1 with NJG 2 formed the 1. Jadgdivision, covering the Netherlands, Belgium and the Ruhr. Operation Corona and Mandrel further confused night fighters as was evident in the October attack on Kassel; in which everything when wrong for the defences. A Naxos radar detector-equipped night fighter recognised the change in course and was able to bring 180 night fighters to Kassel where they destroyed 39 bombers for the loss of six. NJG 1 could claim only four. Meurer, Schnaufer and Werner Husemann were among the claimants.

=== Battle of Berlin, Nuremberg and Normandy ===
In November 1943 Arthur Harris began the "Battle of Berlin" in the belief the destruction of the German capital would end the war without Operation Overlord, the planned amphibious invasion of France. The battle would end in March 1944, in a defensive victory for the German night fighter force. The introduction of SN-2 radar and the passive Flensburg radar detector helped the Luftwaffe crews. Flensburg had been able to detect the Monica radar emissions which warned RAF crews of an approaching night fighter. Naxos radar detector and the SN-2 radars had proved their worth along with Flensburg. The Monica radar gave only warning of a fighter within 1,000 m (3,300 ft) in a 45 degree cone, while Flensburg could detect the bomber from 100 km (62 mi) away. The capture of Monica and Boozer early warning receivers in March 1943 allowed the Germans to develop Flensburg. The Monica set was captured a week after its introduction in a major blow for Bomber Command. The capture of a Ju 88 night fighter that landed in England in July 1944 exposed these developments to the British who then developed counter-measures; mainly by stripping the tail radars from their bombers or switching them off.

By 12 December 1943, the Heinkel He 219 night fighter had been added to NJG 1's order of battle and I. Gruppe were equipped with it. By June 1944, I. Gruppe had 20 He 219s, which proved expensive in time and effort; some 90,000 man-hours per aircraft in comparison to 30,000 on the Ju 88C and G. A handful were delivered to II./NJG 1. At the start of the battle, NJG 1 was mostly still a Bf 110 unit. Streib commanded Stab/NJG 1 and the wing from Deelen. Meurer commanded I./NJG 1 at Venlo which operated the Bf 110 and He 219. II. Gruppe under von Bonnin at Sint Truiden operated the Bf 110 and the Do 217 while Egmont Prinz zur Lippe-Weißenfeld and Hans-Joachim Jabs commanded III. and IV. Gruppe at Twente and Leeuwarden; both operated the Bf 110.

A notable development was the introduction of Schräge Musik, pioneered in NJG 2, was now in use in NJG 1 during 1943 and 1944. Schnaufer, the leading night fighter in history, estimated he claimed 20 to 30 bombers using the upward firing cannon(s). According to Schnaufer, many of the less experienced crew preferred the weapon system to the conventional front-pointing guns. The method of attack was still dangerous, for British bombers carried heavy loads of fuel and explosives. A night fighter pilot could approach the bomber from below and fire into the fuel tanks and engines before making a violent evasive dive away from danger. The approach was possible as British bombers did not carry a ball turret. Schoenert suggested to Kammhuber that a vertical-firing cannon be fitted in a Do 17 in mid-1941 because Becker's tactics were too complicated for the average pilot and attacking from underneath was easier, but his commander rejected the suggestion after reports from Streib and Lent. Kammhuber conceded the point a year later when Schoenert petitioned him again following tests with the Do 217.

1943 ended with pilots from NJG 1 leading the claim charts. Lent was acknowledged to have 76 and led the Luftwaffe in this field. Streib's total stood at 63, Meurer 62 at his death, Schoenert 56, the deceased Frank, 55, the late Geiger 53, Prinz zur Lippe-Weißenfeld 51, Becker, Gildner and Knacke—all of whom had 44—were killed in the year. Schnaufer and Vinke had claimed 42 and 37 respectively. Walter Ehle, killed on 18 November became the earliest casualty of the battle over Berlin. At this time, German night fighters had abandoned the old wild boar operations along with the rigid beacon-based Himmelbett system for a simple practice of using their own radar to detect bombers once ground controllers led them to the bomber stream. When there, pilots were expected to fight until fuel or ammunition was expended. The tame boar method predominated in what was to become a successful period for the night fighter force.

In the midst of the battle, I./NJG 1 lost group commander Meurer—with 65 claims—the third highest scoring night fighter of the war at the time in January 1944. He utilised the Schräge Musik weapon too close to a British bomber which exploded and took Meurer with it. In March 1944 another fighter leader, Egmont Prinz zur Lippe-Weißenfeld was killed on day 12. During the following weeks Bomber Command selected southwest Germany as its main area of operations, allowing for their return over neutral Switzerland. The Luftwaffe responded by transferring II. and III./NJG 1 to France. III./NJG 1 operated from Laon from 20 April. Night fighter operations over France proved costly for the Luftwaffe. Bomber Command flew on moonlit nights and was provided with strong Mosquito fighter support. Luftwaffe pilots hardly managed to engage the bomber streams.

On 23/24 March 1944, Harris authorised a sixteenth, and final attack upon Berlin nearly five weeks after the last; having postponed it from 21 March. 811 bombers set out, with 147 providing diversion raids to Le Havre in France. No. 105 Squadron RAF sent 12 Mosquitos to Twente, Venlo and Sint Truinden; all home to NJG 1 units. A further 17 Mosquitos were sent on pathfinder operations. NJG 2 and 3 were to plan their interceptions along the transit routes near Sylt. NJG 5, and NJG 6 were held for operations near the Baltic coast and Berlin and target area. NJG 4 and 1 were apparently reserved for action against the returning bombers. The diversions had little effect. NJG 1, 2 and 3 operated along the bomber stream route all night. Of the 72 aircraft Bomber Command reported lost, 45 were against predictive anti-aircraft fire, 18 were shot down by night fighters and nine to unknown causes. The Battle of Berlin cost Bomber Command 497 aircraft with a further 72 crashing in England. Included damaged aircraft the total loss stood at 1,128 bombers. 256 night fighters were lost.

On 31 March 1944, Bomber Command carried out its single most costly operation during the war when it attacked Nuremberg. Bomber Command had chosen a direct route in favourable weather conditions enabling German night fighters to be fed easily into the bomber stream. Harris direct route took the stream across several night fighter assembly points and the resulting battles left 95 RAF bombers destroyed. NJG 1 units were scrambled from as far as France. 8./NJG 1, based at the Château de Marchais, near Marchais, Aisne, under the command of Dietrich Schmidt, were sent into combat. Schmidt recorded the horror of combat. When he landed in Germany he found human hair and flesh on one of his propellers, presumably from the Halifax bomber he shot down that night. 2./NJG 1 flew four Bf 110s from Saint-Dizier and operated from Laon; the remaining eight Bf 110s from the Staffel had been destroyed in an American attack on their base shortly before.

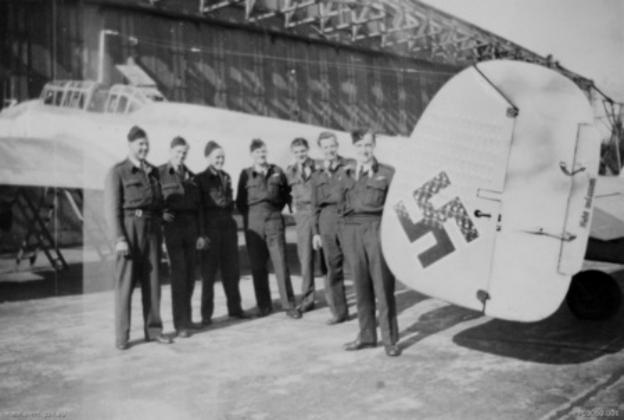
Members of the Royal Australian Air Force pose with Schnaufer's Bf 110 G-4 (G9+BA, Stab/NJG 1) at Schleswig, Germany, shortly after the end of the war (19 June 1945).

The decline of the Luftwaffe night fighter force began only three months after arguably its greatest success. Aerial resistance declined by day and night and a state of air supremacy was achieved by Allied air forces. The Luftwaffe's shortage of fuel to operate and provide sufficient training for fighter crews became apparent. The OKL had not foreseen the collapse of its day and night fighter force and had assumed that Bomber Command would not resume deep-penetration raids for some time. Incredibly, the high command thought the Luftwaffe could prevent a landing in Western Europe. By June 1944, most night fighter units had been moved to the periphery of Luftflotte Reich in Italy, Austria, Hungary and Western Europe. Only NJG 1 and 3 remained in Germany.

On 31 May 1944 NJG 1 reported the following strength; Stab with He. 219 and Bf 110 contained two aircraft with one operational. I./NJG 1 contained the Bf 110, He 219 but also had some Messerschmitt Me 410s had 33 fighters, 26 operational. III./NJG 1 reported all of its 17 Bf 110s operational. IV./NJG 1 stated 14 of the 23 Bf 110s under its command were combat ready. In July, the Normandy Campaign nearing its nadir, NJG 1 were moved to airfields spread over Westphalia. The collapse of the German front in Normandy in August necessitated NJG 1s evacuation of all Staffel from the Low Countries in September 1944 to Münster, Dortmund, Düsseldorf and Fritzlar. The Wehrmacht's hold on the eastern Netherlands allowed for the return of elements of NJG 1 for operations in Twente in November 1944. Stab/NJG 1 relocated to Paderborn, I./NJG 1 to Munster, II./NJG 1 to Düsseldorf, III./NJG 1 to Fritzlar and IV./NJG 1 to Dortmund. 2./NJG 1 was detached and operated from Niedermendig. All Gruppen were subordinated to the 3. Jagddivision.

OKL correctly surmised that high-frequency technology rather than the number and quality of night fighters would decide the next phase of the battle. They drew the wrong conclusions from their successes in early 1944 and wrongly assumed the straightforward devices such as Naxos, SN-2 and Flensburg radar detectors coupled with a high level of training would inflict severe damage on the enemy provided their secrets could be kept from the enemy and enough of them were made available. Production was concentrated on SN-2, while centimetric radar came low on the list of priorities. The radar types in use, used long-wave radar waves which were prone to jamming and created high drag. The decision not to fit SN-2 to He 219s caused high losses of the type. Only Ju 88 units received Naxos. In December 1944, a final concerted effort to regain the high-frequency lead was made in the SN-3 radar. The Allied breakout from Normandy in August 1944 destroyed a significant portion of German early warning systems supporting the Kammhuber Line. This weakened day and night defences but did not leave them helpless. German Y-services continued to provide intelligence on impending air attacks. The Luftwaffe's hope of keeping German radar from the enemy failed. On 13 July 1944, a Ju 88G-1 equipped with the Flensburg radar detector set, landed in England in error and allowed the British to develop counter measures; the Germans never regained a lead in the radar field. Flensburg had been able to detect Monica radar emissions which warned RAF crews of an approaching aircraft.

In equipment the German night fighter force remained capable. The Bf 110 may have been considered obsolete, but in the hands of experienced pilots it remained a formidable night fighter. The victory claims submitted by I./NJG 1 (He 219) and II./NJG 1 (Bf 110) have been analysed from June 1944 onward. Operating under the same conditions II./NJG 1 regularly shot down more bombers than the He 219-group. Nevertheless, Bf 110G production was tapering off as Ju 88G production increased to 339 in December 1944. The technicians at Heinkel cooperated closely with operational units to produce modifications at request, but these were contradictory. In II./NJG 1 pilots argued for a cannon of 30 mm calibre, only later to show a preference for 20 mms [owing to the low-muzzle velocity it required firing from short-range increasing the danger to the German crew]. When the crews complained about the two-man He 219, the manufacturer made modifications for a third member, only for the proposal to be dropped for a complete redesign with this in mind. When it was realised the He 219s performance over the RAF Mosquito proved insufficient the new Heinkel He 419 "Mosquito hunter" was planned, but too late for production. I. Gruppe had 20 He 219A-0, A-2 and A-5s. The A-0 were brought up to latter standards. II./NJG 1 operated small numbers of He 219s, but most pilots were not comfortable with the type and they found the performance was not significantly better than the Bf 110. The crews did not like being perched ahead of the engines and reiterated the drawback of the missing third member or "lookout." Nevertheless, pilots Ernst-Wilhelm Modrow and Heinz Strüning performed well in the He 219. Production of the Heinkel was phased out in January 1945 in favour of the Ju 88G—by this time Strüning had been killed.

From July 1944 to May 1945, Bomber Command made 10 large raids per month. From October 1944 60-80 Mosquitos flew into Germany on an average of ten nights per month. The He 219 pilots in NJG 1 could do little to oppose them. In July 1944 NJG 1 He 219s claimed three of them; but only one near the British aircraft's operating height of 9,000 m (30,000 ft). Soon, the task of opposing the Mosquito intruders fell to single-engine units. Confounding operational issues further, distrust permeated between crews and ground controllers for jamming and the use of decoy aircraft made interceptions difficult. Pilots had no choice but to follow their directions because the only long-range radars, Naxos and Flensburg, became useless by July 1944, and SN-2 was beginning to show signs it had been compromised. The British tactics of flying below 3,000 m (9,800 ft) caused so many contacts on the SN-2 screens it was difficult to identify and follow a specific target. Window and jamming made it very difficult for night fighters to find the bomber stream. The intruder danger became so acute by December that I./NJG 1 reported operations on only six nights claiming one victory for six losses.

Germany's rapidly deteriorating military situation necessitated the use of the night fighters in roles for which they were not equipped or trained. In December 1944, the Wehrmacht and Waffen SS began the Ardennes Offensive to split the British and American armies and capture Antwerp. NJG 1 and other units were ordered to provide close air support during the operation, at night. On 23/24 December 88 night fighters flew ground support missions between Liège, Sedan and Metz, and in support of the Siege of Bastogne. 8./NJG 1 are known to have carried out strafing attacks near Maastricht on 17 December. III./NJG 1 reported the loss of one crew on 26 December 1944, as the land offensive came to a halt. On 1 January 1945, II./NJG 1 provided two Ju 88s as pathfinders for III./JG 1 for Operation Bodenplatte. III./NJG 1 provided four Ju 88s for II. and III./JG 1. Bodenplatte was a disaster. General der Jagdflieger Adolf Galland remarked, "We sacrificed our last substance".

=== 1945: Destruction of the Kammhuber Line ===
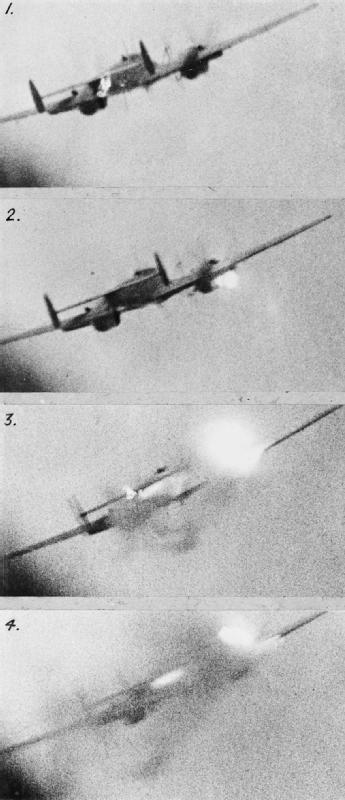
Gun camera film from an RAF fighter, shows the death of Heinz Vinke and his crew

In the Oil campaign of World War II Allied bombing of Axis oil targets in 1944 had an enormous impact on the Wehrmacht. Oil production fell causing fuel shortages which limited the effectiveness of German land and air operations. By mid-1944 Speer warned that if the oil plants could not be protected, the Luftwaffe would run out of fuel. The fuel shortage directly affected the Luftwaffe night fighter defences. Training, already inadequate, was curtailed and the night fighters were not in a position to impose serious losses on Bomber Command after August 1944. In the winter 1944/45, the night fighter force contained 1,355 aircraft. This impressive force was 85 percent operational but the fuel shortages forced it to remain grounded. On 10 January 1945, NJG 1 reported a strength of 20 Bf 110s (18 operational) in Stab/NJG 1, I. Gruppe, 64 He 219s (45 operational), 24 of 37 Bf 110s combat ready in II. Gruppe, 31 from 73 Bf 110s in III. Gruppe and 24 from 33 in IV. Gruppe. The remaining crews were regarded as among the Luftwaffe's most precious assets. Their loss to the Mosquito intruders of 100 Group were out of proportion to the psychological damage done. Thus, one historian writes, an air of "Mosquito phobia" took hold by mid-1944. Hans-Heinz Augenstein was another member of a successful NJG 1 night fighter team to be killed by an intruder in December 1944.

Along with fuel shortages the Luftwaffe night fighter force had to contend with technical setbacks by late 1944. No. 100 Group RAF Mosquitos were equipped with Serrate radar detector allowing the RAF crews to home in on emissions created from German SN-2. Other Mosquitos were equipped with "perfectos" which sent interrogating pulses to trigger the IFF (identification friend or foe) in German fighters. When the German set replied, the signal betrayed the aircraft as hostile along with the bearing and range of the German crew. Losses were sustained against the British intruders and were compounded when German crews switched off their sets which exposed them to friendly-fire. The impact of the technical and fuel failures were evident in the statistics. In January 1945, 1,058 sorties were flown, 117 aircraft claimed 1.3 percent of the attacking force and 47 reported lost. In February 1945, another 47 were reported lost and 181 enemy bombers claimed; 1.2 percent of the attacking forces.

The German defences so weakened that by the time of the Bombing of Dresden, the weather was biggest obstacle to Bomber Command. Just six bombers were lost over Dresden, three of those losses were caused by bombs dropped upon lower flying bombers. Hans Leickhardt, NJG 5, was the only Luftwaffe night fighter pilot to submit a claim on this night. Night fighters proved capable of inflicting damage on the bomber streams for the rest of the war. On 21 February 1945, Bomber Command attacked Duisburg, Worms and the Mitteland Canal, losing 34 bombers. German pilots claimed 59 shot down; NJG 1 claimed 14. The February battles were the last successes of the night fighter force. The use of Neptun, or FuG 218 radar improved detection rates because of its resistance to jamming and Bomber Command crews kept their Monica sets on longer than before. The Naxos-Ju 88s were reporting few losses than other types on this time, for it gave German crews warning of an enemy to the rear.

To retrieve the desperate situation in the night war, Göring authorised the implementation of intruder operations over Britain again. Schnaufer, commanding Nachtjagdgeschwader 4, added his voice to the calls for reinstating these operations. Schnaufer found that by pursuing RAF bombers over the North Sea the interference to his radar ceased and he could fly around unmolested. The operation was named Operation Gisela, and set for the 3/4 March 1945. The operation resulted in 22 German aircraft destroyed, 12 aircraft damaged. 45 were killed and 11 injured, 24 bombers were destroyed and 9 damaged. British casualties amounted to 78 killed, 18 wounded. NJG 1 operated against the incoming raid and were not involved in the intruder mission; Drewes and Greiner filed victory claims on this night. At the end of March 1945 the Western Allied invasion of Germany began. Allied armies breached the Siegfried Line and the Rhine. In April 1945 the Kammhuber Line disintegrated completely as American and Soviet forces met at Torgau. Germany was fragmented and the remnants of the Wehrmacht isolated in pockets near the Ruhr and in Bavaria. Allied forces discovered hundreds of abandoned German night fighters on airfields across Germany, unable to find the fuel to fight further.

Elements of NJG 1 continued to resist Bomber Command to the end of the war over central and eastern Germany. I./NJG 1 flew a last night fighter operation on 3/4 April 1945. The last victory of the war was claimed by III Gruppe on 16/17 April 1945.

== Commanding officers ==
Kommodore

- Oberst Wolfgang Falck, 26 June 1940 – 30 June 1943
- Oberst Werner Streib, 1 July 1943 – March 1944
- Oberstleutnant Hans-Joachim Jabs, March 1944 – May 1945

I/NJG 1

- Hauptmann Günther Radusch, 1 July 1940 – 6 October 1940
- Major Werner Streib, 18 October 1940 – 1 July 1943
- Hauptmann Hans-Dieter Frank, 1 July 1943 – 27 September 1943
- Hauptmann Manfred Meurer, 28 September 1943 – 21 January 1944
- Major Paul Förster, January 1944 - 1 October 1944
- Hauptmann Werner Baake, 2 October 1944 – 8 May 1945

II/NJG 1

- Hauptmann Heinrich Graf von Stillfried und Rattonitz, 2 October 1940 – 6 October 1940
- Major Walter Ehle, 6 October 1940 – 17 November 1943
- Major Eckart-Wilhelm von Bonin, 18 November 1943 – 25 October 1944
- Hauptmann Adolf Breves, 26 October 1944 – 8 May 1945

III/NJG 1

- Hauptmann Philipp von Bothmer, 1 July 1940 - 1 November 1940
- Hauptmann Schön, 1 November 1940 – 1 February 1941
- Hauptmann von Graeve 8 February 1941 – 5 June 1942
- Hauptmann Wolfgang Thimmig, 6 June 1942 – 31 May 1943
- Major Egmont Prinz zur Lippe-Weißenfeld, 1 June 1943 – 20 February 1944
- Major Martin Drewes, 1 March 1944 – 8 May 1945

IV/NJG 1

- Major Helmut Lent, 1 October 1942 – 1 August 1943
- Hauptmann Hans-Joachim Jabs, 1 August 1943 – 1 March 1944
- Major Heinz-Wolfgang Schnaufer, 1 March 1944 – 26 October 1944
- Hauptmann Hermann Greiner, 1 November 1944 – 8 May 1945
