= Dietrich Schmidt (pilot) =

German Luftwaffe pilot (1919–2002)

- Born: 27 June 1919; Karlsruhe
- Died: 6 March 2002 (aged 82); Hofheim
- Military career
- Allegiance: Nazi Germany
- Branch: Luftwaffe
- Service years: ?–1945
- Rank: Hauptmann (captain)
- Unit: NJG 1
- Conflicts: World War II: Defense of the Reich
- Awards: Knight's Cross of the Iron Cross

Dietrich Schmidt (27 June 1919 – 6 March 2002) was a Luftwaffe night fighter ace and recipient of the Knight's Cross of the Iron Cross during World War II. The Knight's Cross of the Iron Cross, and its variants were the highest awards in the military and paramilitary forces of Nazi Germany during World War II.

== Night fighter career ==
A map of part of the Kammhuber Line. The 'belt' and night fighter 'boxes' are shown.

Following the 1939 aerial Battle of the Heligoland Bight, bombing missions by the Royal Air Force (RAF) shifted to the cover of darkness, initiating the Defence of the Reich campaign. By mid-1940, Generalmajor (Brigadier General) Josef Kammhuber had established a night air defense system dubbed the Kammhuber Line. It consisted of a series of control sectors equipped with radars and searchlights and an associated night fighter. Each sector, named a Himmelbett (canopy bed), would direct the night fighter into visual range with target bombers. In 1941, the Luftwaffe started equipping night fighters with airborne radar such as the Lichtenstein radar. This airborne radar did not come into general use until early 1942.

Oberleutnant Schmidt was initially posted to 8./Nachtjagdgeschwader 1 (NJG 1—1st Night Fighter Wing) in September 1941, based at Twente in the Netherlands. He claimed his first victory on the night of 24/25 March 1943, a Handley Page Halifax bomber over Enkhuizen. On 15 June 1943 Schmidt was appointed Staffelkapitän of 8./NJG 1, having claimed five victories by this time.

On the night of 1/2 January 1944, he claimed an Avro Lancaster bomber shot down near Ramsel for his 10th victory. On the night of 14/15 January 1944, Schmidt claimed his 12th aerial victory. The RAF had targeted Braunschweig with 498 bombers that night. Schmidt was credited with the destruction of Lancaster ND357 from No. 156 Squadron.

He claimed three victories in a single night on 3/4 May, 22/23 May, and 28/29 July. Schmidt was awarded the Knight's Cross of the Iron Cross (Ritterkreuz des Eisernen Kreuzes) on 27 July for 32 victories. Schmidt transferred as Staffelkapitän to 9./NJG 1 in December 1944. He added five further victories to raise his victory total to 43 by the end of the war. Schmidt was then interned by British troops at Schleswig-Holstein, and released in August 1945.

He attended Heidelberg University obtaining a doctorate in Chemistry, married and fathered three children. Schmidt retired in 1984.

Dietrich Schmidt was credited with 43 victories in 171 missions. All his victories were recorded at night. (Note: For a list of Luftwaffe night fighter aces see List of German World War II night fighter aces.)

== Summary of career ==
=== Aerial victory claims ===
Author Spick lists him with 39 aerial victories, claimed in 171 combat missions. Foreman, Parry and Mathews, authors of Luftwaffe Night Fighter Claims 1939 – 1945, researched the German Federal Archives and found records for 43 nocturnal victory claims. Mathews and Foreman also published Luftwaffe Aces — Biographies and Victory Claims, listing Schmidt with 40 aerial victories, plus one further unconfirmed claim.

Chronicle of aerial victories
This and the ? (question mark) indicates information discrepancies listed in Luftwaffe Night Fighter Claims 1939 – 1945 and in Luftwaffe Aces — Biographies and Victory Claims.
Claim	Date	Time	Type	Location	Serial No./Squadron No.
– 8. Staffel of Nachtjagdgeschwader 1 –
1	25 March 1943	01:36	Halifax	northeast of Enkhuizen	
2	5 May 1943	01:15	Lancaster	Nordhorn	
3? (Note: This claim is not listed in Luftwaffe Aces — Biographies and Victory Claims.)	5 May 1943	02:16?	Wellington		
4	14 May 1943	03:44	Lancaster	6 km (3.7 mi) southwest of Rühlertwist	Lancaster "DX-X"/No. 57 Squadron
5	13 June 1943	01:30	Lancaster	1 km (0.62 mi) west of Ahaus	
6	20 October 1943	20:45	Lancaster		
7	3 November 1943	19:46	Halifax	east of Sint-Truiden	
8? (Note: According to Luftwaffe Aces — Biographies and Victory Claims, this claim was unconfirmed while Luftwaffe Night Fighter Claims 1939 – 1945 confirm this claim.)	26 November 1943	22:54	Lancaster	Emlichheim	
9	16 December 1943	18:45	Lancaster	west of Cloppenburg	
10	2 January 1944	01:58	Lancaster	Ramsel	
11	14 January 1944	05:36	Mosquito	vicinity of Kleve	Mosquito DZ440//No. 109 Squadron
12	14 January 1944	20:35	Lancaster	Kolhorn	Lancaster ND357/No. 156 Squadron
13	16 March 1944	00:56	Lancaster	1 km (0.62 mi) southeast of Langweiler	
14	18 March 1944	22:35	Halifax	Kaiserslautern	
15	22 March 1944	22:36	Halifax	north-northwest of Paderborn-Minden	
16	24 March 1944	23:04	Lancaster	Erfurt	
17?	24 March 1944	23:04	Lancaster	Gotha	
18	31 March 1944	00:49	Halifax	north of Würzburg	
19	23 April 1944	00:21	Lancaster	south of Laon	
20	23 April 1944	00:26	Lancaster	southwest of Laon	Stirling EH842/No. 218 Squadron (Note: According to the website Aircrew Remembered, this claim should be attributed to Otto Fries.)
21	27 April 1944	00:47	four-engined bomber	Dijon	Lancaster LL919/No. 619 Squadron
22	4 May 1944	00:03	Lancaster	southwest of Saint-Dizier	
23	4 May 1944	00:19	Lancaster	west of Saint-Dizier	
24	4 May 1944	00:46	Lancaster	south-southwest of Romilly-sur-Seine	
25	22 May 1944	02:01	Lancaster	south of Amsterdam	
26	23 May 1944	00:42	Lancaster	5 km (3.1 mi) north of Ibbenbüren	
27	23 May 1944	03:13	Lancaster	North Sea	
28	23 May 1944	03:48	four-engined bomber	North Sea	
29	13 June 1944	01:24	Lancaster	north of Venlo	
30	21 July 1944	01:16	Lancaster	50 km (31 mi) west of Duisburg	
31	21 July 1944	01:41	Lancaster	30 km (19 mi) northwest of Volkel	
32	29 July 1944	01:11	Halifax	west of Hamburg	
33	29 July 1944	01:37	Halifax	north of Bruchsal	
34	29 July 1944	01:50	four-engined bomber	10 km (6.2 mi) northwest of Helgoland	
35	13 August 1944	00:47	Lancaster	50 km (31 mi) south of Braunschweig	
36	23 September 1944	23:31	Lancaster	southern edge of Zuiderzee	
37	6 December 1944	20:14	Lancaster	northwest of Twente	
38	18 December 1944	06:36	four-engined bomber	west of Duisburg	
– 9. Staffel of Nachtjagdgeschwader 1 –
39	15 January 1945? (Note: According to Luftwaffe Aces — Biographies and Victory Claims on 16 January 1945.)	21:15	Lancaster	northeast of Frankfurt-an-der-Oder	
40	21 February 1945	01:10	Lancaster		
41	21 February 1945	23:18	Lancaster	10 km (6.2 mi) west of Venlo	
42	21 February 1945	23:25	Lancaster	25 km (16 mi) southwest of Goch	
43	22 March 1945	04:00	Lancaster	Cologne	

=== Awards ===
- Flugzeugführerabzeichen
- Front Flying Clasp of the Luftwaffe
- Iron Cross (1939) 2nd and 1st Class
- Honour Goblet of the Luftwaffe (Ehrenpokal der Luftwaffe) on 24 April 1944 as Oberleutnant and pilot
- German Cross in Gold on 1 October 1944 as Oberleutnant in the 8./Nachtjagdgeschwader 1
- Knight's Cross of the Iron Cross on 27 July 1944 as Oberleutnant and Staffelkapitän of the 8./Nachtjagdgeschwader 1
