= Hans-Heinz Augenstein =

German fighter ace and Knight's Cross recipient (1921–1944)

- Born: 11 July 1921; Pforzheim, Germany
- Died: 7 December 1944 (aged 23); Münster, Germany
- Cause of death: Killed in action
- Military career
- Allegiance: Nazi Germany
- Branch: Luftwaffe
- Rank: Oberleutnant (first lieutenant)
- Unit: NJG 1
- Commands: 12./NJG 1
- Conflicts: See battles World War II: Defense of the Reich †
- Awards: Knight's Cross of the Iron Cross

Hans-Heinz Augenstein (11 July 1921 – 7 December 1944) was a German Luftwaffe military aviator and flying ace during World War II. A flying ace or fighter ace is a military aviator credited with shooting down five or more enemy aircraft during aerial combat. Operating as a night fighter pilot, he was credited with 46 aerial victories, of which 45 were four-engine bombers, all of which claimed in Defense of the Reich. (Note: For a list of Luftwaffe night fighter aces see List of German World War II night fighter aces)

Born in Pforzheim-Brötzingen, Augenstein grew up in the Weimar Republic and Nazi Germany. He joined the military service in the Luftwaffe and was trained as a night fighter pilot. Following flight training, he was posted to Nachtjagdgeschwader 1 (NJG 1—1st Fighter Wing) in 1942. Flying with this wing, Augenstein claimed his first aerial victory on 13/14 May 1943 over a Royal Air Force (RAF) bomber aircraft. In March 1944, he was appointed squadron leader of 12. Staffel (12th squadron) of NJG 1 and was awarded the Knight's Cross of the Iron Cross on 9 June 1944 for 35 nocturnal aerial victories claimed. On 7 December 1944, Augenstein was killed in action when he was shot down by an RAF night fighter near Münster.

== Early life ==
Augenstein was born on 11 July 1921 in Pforzheim-Brötzingen, at the time in the Republic of Baden of the Weimar Republic.

== World War II ==
World War II in Europe began on Friday, 1 September 1939, when German forces invaded Poland. Following the 1939 aerial Battle of the Heligoland Bight, Royal Air Force (RAF) attacks shifted to the cover of darkness, initiating the Defence of the Reich campaign. By mid-1940, Generalmajor (Brigadier General) Josef Kammhuber had established a night air defense system dubbed the Kammhuber Line. It consisted of a series of control sectors equipped with radars and searchlights and an associated night fighter. Each sector named a Himmelbett (canopy bed) would direct the night fighter into visual range with target bombers. In 1941, the Luftwaffe started equipping night fighters with airborne radar such as the Lichtenstein radar. This airborne radar did not come into general use until early 1942.

=== Night fighter career ===
A map of part of the Kammhuber Line. The 'belt' and night fighter 'boxes' are shown.

Augenstein first served with 3. Staffel (3rd squadron) of Nachtjagdgeschwader 1 (NJG 1—1st Fighter Wing) during mid 1942. In late 1942, Augenstein transferred to 7. Staffel. This squadron was part of III. Gruppe (3rd group) of NJG 1 and at the time commanded by Hauptmann Wolfgang Thimmig. Augenstein was credited with his first aerial victory on the night of 13/14 May 1943 when he shot down an Avro Lancaster bomber 6 kilometres (3.7 miles) east of Lingen On the night of 23/24 May, RAF Bomber Command sent 829 heavy bombers to Dortmund of which 38 were lost. Defending against this attack, Augenstein shot down a Handley Page Halifax 6 km (3.7 mi) southwest of Raalte.

Bomber Command sent 518 bombers on a mission to bomb Essen on the night of 27/28 May, 23 bombers did not return to England. Augenstein was credited with four aerial victories that night, including three Halifax and a Vickers Wellington bomber. The Wellington was HE752 from No. 166 Squadron which crashed near Hengelo. On 11/12 June, Bomber Command attacked Düsseldorf with 890 bombers. The RAF lost 43 aircraft that night, including a Lancaster bomber shot down by Augenstein 8 km (5.0 mi) northeast of Deventer. The following night, Bomber Command lost 24 bombers in an attack on Bochum. Augenstein was credited with the destruction of two Halifax bombers that night. Augenstein was awarded the German Cross in Gold (Deutsches Kreuz in Gold) on 16 January 1944.

=== Squadron leader and death ===
On 1 March 1944, Augenstein was made Staffelkapitän (squadron leader) of 12. Staffel of NJG 1 On the night of 27/28 May, Bomber Command attacked Leopoldsburg. Augenstein claimed three Halifax bombers shot down that night, taking his total to 40 aerial victories. A little less than two weeks later, on 9 June, he was awarded the Knight's Cross of the Iron Cross (Ritterkreuz des Eisernen Kreuzes). Augenstein was shot down on the night of 15/16 June near Roubaix, possibly by Flight Lieutenant W. W. Provan from No. 29 Squadron.

On the night of 2/3 November, flying from an airfield at Dortmund, Augenstein claimed his last three aerial victories during an RAF raid on Düsseldorf. (Note: Authors Mathews and Foreman date these claims on the evening of 4 November, stating that Augenstein shot down three Lancaster bombers.) On the night of 7 December 1944, Augenstein's Messerschmitt Bf 110 G-4 (Werknummer 140078—factory number) was shot down 10 km (6.2 mi) northwest of Münster-Handorf by a De Havilland Mosquito night fighter of the Fighter Interception Unit, flown by RAF ace Flight Lieutenant Edward Richard Hedgecoe and Flight Sergeant J.R. Whitham. Augenstein and his Bordfunker Feldwebel Günther Steins were killed but his air gunner Unteroffizier Kurt Schmidt bailed out unhurt. Augenstein was credited with 46 victories, all recorded at night and including 45 four-engine bombers.

== Summary of career ==
=== Aerial victory claims ===
Augenstein was credited with 46 victories, of which 45 were four-engine bombers. Foreman, Parry and Mathews, authors of Luftwaffe Night Fighter Claims 1939 – 1945, researched the German Federal Archives and found records for 45 nocturnal victory claims. Mathews and Foreman also published Luftwaffe Aces — Biographies and Victory Claims, listing Augenstein with 41 claims, plus five further unconfirmed claim.

Chronicle of aerial victories
This and the – (dash) indicates unwitnessed aerial victory claims for which Augenstein did not receive credit. This and the % (percent sign) indicates aerial victories listed in Luftwaffe Aces — Biographies and Victory Claims but not in Luftwaffe Night Fighter Claims 1939 – 1945. This and the ? (question mark) indicates discrepancies between Luftwaffe Night Fighter Claims 1939 – 1945 and Luftwaffe Aces — Biographies and Victory Claims.
Claim	Date	Time	Type	Location	Serial No./Squadron No.
– 7. Staffel of Nachtjagdgeschwader 1 –
1	13 May 1943	23:57	Lancaster	6 km (3.7 mi) east of Lingen	
2	24 May 1943	02:39	Halifax	6 km (3.7 mi) southwest of Raalte	Halifax DK169/No. 76 Squadron RAF
3	28 May 1943	00:54	Wellington	3 km (1.9 mi) southwest of Hengelo	Wellington HE752/No. 166 Squadron RAF
4	28 May 1943	01:05	Halifax	3 km (1.9 mi) northeast of Heek (Nienborg)	
5	28 May 1943	01:21	Halifax	Leer	Halifax DK147/No. 76 Squadron RAF
6	28 May 1943	01:37	Halifax	10 km (6.2 mi) east-northeast of Deventer	
7	12 June 1943	03:00	Lancaster	8 km (5.0 mi) northeast of Deventer	
8	13 June 1943	01:56	Halifax	5 km (3.1 mi) west of Gildehaus	Halifax W7909/No. 10 Squadron RAF
9	13 June 1943	02:03	Halifax	northeast of Oldenzaal	Halifax DT568/No. 51 Squadron RAF
– III. Gruppe of Nachtjagdgeschwader 1 –
10	27/28 August 1943	—	Stirling	20 km (12 mi) northwest of Nuremberg	
11? (Note: According to Luftwaffe Aces — Biographies and Victory Claims, this claim was unconfirmed while Luftwaffe Night Fighter Claims 1939 – 1945 confirm this claim.)	28 August 1943	00:03	four-engined bomber	Nuremberg-Lohe	
– 9. Staffel of Nachtjagdgeschwader 1 –
12	6 September 1943	00:45	Stirling	Schönborn	Stirling EH878/No. 623 Squadron RAF
13	6 September 1943	01:07	Lancaster	5 km (3.1 mi) northwest of Landau	
14	22 September 1943	22:45	Lancaster	Hüpede	Halifax HR776/No. 158 Squadron RAF
15	23 September 1943	22:50	Lancaster	3 km (1.9 mi) north of Speyer	
16	23 September 1943	23:00	Lancaster	3 km (1.9 mi) north of Kirchheimbolanden	
17	27 September 1943	23:00	Halifax	west of Lübbecke	
18	3 October 1943	01:42	Halifax	7 km (4.3 mi) east of Kassel	
19	9 October 1943	01:42	Lancaster	south-southwest of Hanover	
20	20 October 1943	22:24	Lancaster	Ommen	Lancaster JA907/No. 7 Squadron RAF
21	20 October 1943	22:45	Lancaster	near Zwolle	
22	3 November 1943	20:03	Lancaster	southwest of Sundern	Lancaster DV265/No. 101 Squadron RAF
23?	26 November 1943	02:55	Halifax	Frankfurt (Oder)	Halifax LK995/No. 429 Squadron RAF
– 7. Staffel of Nachtjagdgeschwader 1 –
24	16 December 1943	19:00	Lancaster	south of Osnabrück	
25	24 December 1943	03:00	Lancaster	Frankfurt (Oder)	Lancaster LL671/No. 514 Squadron RAF
26	22 January 1944	03:00	Halifax	4 km (2.5 mi) east-southeast of Oldenzaal	
—	27 January 1944	—	Lancaster		
27	30 January 1944	21:49	Lancaster		Lancaster JA702/No. 156 Squadron RAF
28?	30 January 1944	22:00	Lancaster		
29	15 February 1944	22:48	Halifax	Emmerich	
30	20 February 1944	02:30	Lancaster	ES-5	
31?	25 February 1944	02:50	Halifax	south of Augsburg	
32	26 February 1944	02:30	Lancaster		
– 12. Staffel of Nachtjagdgeschwader 1 –
34	2 May 1944	00:32	Lancaster	near Ghent	
35	2 May 1944	00:25	Halifax	8 km (5.0 mi) north of Mechelen	
36	23 May 1944	01:21	Lancaster	Eindhoven	
37	23 May 1944	01:34	Lancaster	Hoogstraten area	
38	28 May 1944	02:13	Halifax		
39	28 May 1944	02:15	Halifax		
40	28 May 1944	02:17	Halifax		
41%	13 June 1944	00:33	Lancaster	Cambrai	
42	29 July 1944	01:52	four-engined bomber	15 km (9.3 mi) west of Stuttgart	
43	29 July 1944	02:11	four-engined bomber	near Stuttgart	
– IV. Gruppe of Nachtjagdgeschwader 1 –
44	4/5 November 1944	—	Lancaster		
45	4/5 November 1944	—	Lancaster		
46	4/5 November 1944	—	Lancaster		

=== Awards ===
- Honour Goblet of the Luftwaffe on 17 January 1944 as Leutnant and pilot
- German Cross in Gold on 16 January 1944 as Leutnant in the 7./Nachjagdgeschwader 1
- Knight's Cross of the Iron Cross on 9 June 1944 as Oberleutnant and Staffelführer of the 7./Nachjagdgeschwader 1
