= Manfred Meurer =

German World War II fighter pilot

- Meurer as a Hauptmann
- Born: 8 September 1919; Free City of Hamburg, Weimar Republic
- Died: 22 January 1944 (aged 24) near Magdeburg, Free State of Prussia, Nazi Germany
- Cause of death: Killed in action
- Burial place: Ohlsdorf Cemetery in Hamburg
- Military career
- Allegiance: Nazi Germany
- Branch: Luftwaffe
- Service years: 1938–1944
- Rank: Hauptmann (Captain)
- Unit: NJG 1
- Commands: 3./NJG 1, I./NJG 1
- Conflicts: See battles World War II: Defense of the Reich; Battle of the Ruhr; Battle of Berlin †
- Awards: Knight's Cross of the Iron Cross with Oak Leaves

Manfred Meurer (8 September 1919 – 22 January 1944) was a German Luftwaffe military aviator during World War II, a night fighter ace credited with 65 aerial victories claimed in 130 combat missions making him the fifth most successful night fighter pilot in the history of aerial warfare. All of his victories were claimed over the Western Front in Defense of the Reich missions against the Royal Air Force's (RAF) Bomber Command.

Born in Hamburg, Meurer grew up in the Weimar Republic and Nazi Germany. Following graduation from school and the compulsory Reichsarbeitsdienst (Reich Labour Service), he joined the military service in 1938, at first with an anti aircraft artillery regiment before being trained as a pilot. Meurer then served with Zerstörergeschwader 76 (ZG 76—76th Destroyer Wing), flying a Messerschmitt Bf 110 heavy fighter. In October 1941, he transferred to Nachtjagdgeschwader 1 (NJG 1—1st Night Fighter Wing) where he became a night fighter pilot and claimed his first aerial victory on the night of 26/27 March 1942. Meurer was appointed squadron leader of 3. Staffel (3rd squadron) of NJG 1 in January 1943. Following his 50th aerial victory, he was awarded the Knight's Cross of the Iron Cross with Oak Leaves on 2 August 1943. The Knight's Cross (German: Ritterkreuz), and its variants were the highest awards in the military and paramilitary forces of Nazi Germany during World War II. On 5 August 1943, he was appointed group commander of II. Gruppe of Nachtjagdgeschwader 5 (NJG 5—5th Night Fighter Wing). Meurer and his crew were killed in action in a mid-air collision with an RAF bomber on the night of 21/22 January 1944.

== Early life and career ==
Meurer, the son of sports editor-in-chief Georg Meurer, was born on 8 September 1919 in Hamburg, at the time a sovereign state of the Weimar Republic. After attending school and passing his Abitur (School Leaving Certificate) and compulsory Reichsarbeitsdienst (Reich Labour Service), he joined the military service of Nazi Germany in 1938. He initially served with Flak-Regiment 6 (6th anti aircraft artillery regiment) of the Luftwaffe as a Fahnenjunker (officer cadet).

== World War II ==
World War II in Europe began on Friday 1 September 1939 when German forces invaded Poland. Following the outbreak of war, Meurer was accepted for flight training and was promoted to Leutnant (second lieutenant) on 1 April 1940. (Note: Flight training in the Luftwaffe progressed through the levels A1, A2 and B1, B2, referred to as A/B flight training. A training included theoretical and practical training in aerobatics, navigation, long-distance flights and dead-stick landings. The B courses included high-altitude flights, instrument flights, night landings and training to handle the aircraft in difficult situations. For pilots destined to fly multi-engine aircraft, the training was completed with the Luftwaffe Advanced Pilot's Certificate (Erweiterter Luftwaffen-Flugzeugführerschein), also known as the C-Certificate.) From the Heeresaufklärern (army aerial reconnaissance), he was posted to II. Gruppe (2nd group) of Zerstörergeschwader 76 (ZG 76—76th Destroyer Wing). (Note: For an explanation of Luftwaffe unit designations see Organization of the Luftwaffe during World War II.) In Oktober 1941, he transferred to III. Gruppe (3rd group) of Nachtjagdgeschwader 1 (NJG 1—1st Night Fighter Wing) where he became a night fighter pilot. There, he was assigned to the 9. Staffel (9th squadron) of NJG 1.

=== Night fighter career ===
A map of part of the Kammhuber Line. The 'belt' and night fighter 'boxes' are shown.

Following the 1939 aerial Battle of the Heligoland Bight, Royal Air Force (RAF) attacks shifted to the cover of darkness, initiating the Defence of the Reich campaign. By mid-1940, Generalmajor (Brigadier General) Josef Kammhuber had established a night air defense system dubbed the Kammhuber Line. It consisted of a series of control sectors equipped with radars and searchlights and an associated night fighter. Each sector named a Himmelbett (canopy bed) would direct the night fighter into visual range with target bombers. In 1941, the Luftwaffe started equipping night fighters with airborne radar such as the Lichtenstein radar. This airborne radar did not come into general use until early 1942.

Meurer was credited with his first aerial victory on 26/27 March 1942, a Vickers Wellington bomber, claimed shot down at 00:10 approximately 2 kilometres (1.2 miles) east of Wichmond. For this, he was awarded the Iron Cross 2nd Class (Eisernes Kreuz zweiter Klasse) on 17 April 1942. On 30/31 May 1942, he claimed his second victory, a Handley Page Hampden at 02:05 roughly 3 kilometres (1.9 miles) north of Deventer. The Hampden was identified as P2116 from the RAF No. 14 Operational Training Unit. He shot down a Handley Page Halifax at 01:54 on 2/3 June 1942 claimed near Emmerich. At 04:17 on 15/16 August 1942, Meurer claimed a Wellington shot down at Rozendaal. Meurer became an ace on the night of 10/11 September 1942 after having claimed a Wellington shot down at 00:06 in the vicinity 1 kilometre (0.62 miles) west of Bienen. Three nights later, he claimed his sixth victory over an Avro Lancaster bomber at 03:26 about 10 kilometres (6.2 miles) north of Apeldoorn. On 1/2 October 1942, he claimed another Wellington shot down at 21:47 roughly 2 kilometres (1.2 miles) north-northeast of Haldern. Meurer claimed his last aerial victory in 1942 on the night of 15/16 October. The victory was claimed over a Halifax bomber at 22:52 about 1 kilometre (0.62 miles) north of Hellendoorn. Credited with eight victories, he was awarded the Iron Cross 1st Class (Eisernes Kreuz erster Klasse) on 19 December 1942.

=== Staffelkapitän ===
On 1 January 1943, Meurer was appointed Staffelkapitän (squadron leader) of 3. Staffel (3rd squadron) of NJG 1. His first victory of 1943 was claimed on the night of 3/4 January. He shot down a Lancaster at 20:23 about 20 kilometres (12 miles) north-northeast of Roermond. The aircraft was Lancaster "U-Uncle" from No. 207 Squadron piloted by Flight Sergeant 'Barry' Chaster. In the attack, four crew members were killed. His 10th aerial victory was over a Halifax claimed at 20:53 on 27/28 January 1943 at Handel, followed by a Stirling claimed at 20:41 on 3/4 February 1943 near 5 kilometres (3.1 miles) south of Amersfoort.

On 14/15 February 1943, he claimed three heavy bombers, two Halifax and one Wellington. At 20:05 about 50 kilometres (31 miles) east of Eindhoven, he claimed the first Halifax of the night. The second was believed to have been shot down at 20:20 north-northeast of Maastricht. The Wellington was then claimed at 21:06 roughly 5 kilometres (3.1 miles) west of Roermond. Meurer claimed two bombers shot down on 26/27 February 1943. He destroyed a Lancaster at 21:18 about 10 kilometres (6.2 miles) northeast of Roermond, and a Wellington at 21:35 roughly 20 kilometres (12 miles) northeast of Eindhoven. On 1/2 March 1942, he was victorious over another Lancaster, claimed at 23:56 approximately 10 kilometres (6.2 miles) southeast of Rotterdam.

=== Battle of the Ruhr ===
In March 1943, RAF Bomber Command, under the command of Air Chief Marshal Sir Arthur Harris, initiated a 5-month long campaign of strategic bombing targeting the industrial centres in the Ruhr Area. This series of bombing attacks, dubbed the Battle of the Ruhr (5 March 1943 – 31 July 1943), caused heavy damage to German industry. (Note: During the Battle of the Ruhr, Bomber Command severely disrupted German production. Tooze states steel production fell by 200,000 tons and the armaments industry was facing a steel shortfall of 400,000 tons. After doubling production in 1942, production of steel increased only by 20 percent in 1943. Adolf Hitler and Albert Speer were forced to cut planned increases in production. This disruption caused the Zulieferungskrise (sub-components crisis). The increase of aircraft production for the Luftwaffe also came to an abrupt halt. Monthly production failed to increase between July 1943 and March 1944. Tooze concludes; "Bomber Command had stopped Speer's armamanets miracle in its tracks".) The Battle of the Ruhr began with a 442-aircraft attack on Essen on the night of 5/6 March 1943. That night, Meurer shot down a Halifax shot down at 20:57 west of Düsseldorf and, at 21:20, a Wellington 4 kilometres (2.5 miles) northwest of Weeze. On 12/13 March 1943, as RAF Bomber Command targeted the Krupp factory in Essen, Meurer claimed four aerial victories, two Halifax, one Lancaster, and one Wellington. The first Halifax was shot down at 21:16 northwest of Venlo; the Lancaster at 21:25 approximately 3–5 kilometres (1.9–3.1 miles) east of Bergen; the second Halifax at 21:48 at Grafwegen;and the Wellington at 22:25 roughly 25 kilometres (16 miles) northeast of 's-Hertogenbosch. Credited with 23 aerial victories, Meurer was awarded the Honour Goblet of the Luftwaffe (Ehrenpokal der Luftwaffe) on 15 March 1943, the German Cross in Gold (Deutsches Kreuz in Gold) on 31 March 1943, and the Knight's Cross of the Iron Cross (Ritterkreuz des Eisernen Kreuzes) on 16 April 1943.

In May 1943, Meuerer was credited with 14 more aerial victories, which included one on 12/13 May, another the next night, three on 23/24 May, again three on 25/26 May, two on 27/28 May, and four on 29/30 May. The victory on 12/13 May was over a Wellington, claimed at 02:10 roughly 18 kilometres (11 miles) east-southeast Eindhoven. On 13/14 May at 02:31, a Halifax was claimed in an unknown location. The three victories claimed on 23/24 May were over a Wellington at 01:55 about 13 kilometres (8.1 miles) northwest of Eindhoven, a second Wellington at 02:12 east of Essen, and a Lancaster at 02:33 in a position 32 kilometres (20 miles) southeast of Nijmegen. The three further victories claimed on 25/26 May were over a Wellington at 01:24 at Oostrum, a Lancaster at 01:36 about 10 kilometres (6.2 miles) southeast of Roermond, and a second Lancaster at 02:08 in a position 5 kilometres (3.1 miles) west of Nijmegen. The two victories claimed on 27/28 May were over a Lancaster at 00:38 about 2 kilometres (1.2 miles) north-northeast of Barlo, and a Wellington at 02:12 approximately 21 kilometres (13 miles) southeast of Wanroij. On 21/22 June 1943, Bomber command targeted Krefeld, losing 44 aircraft in the attack. That night, Meurer shot down two bombers, one from No. 83 Squadron and another from No. 77 Squadron. Meurer's aircraft was hit by defensive fire of his second opponent, forcing him to bail out. His first victory was a Lancaster shot down at 01:23 about 2 kilometres (1.2 miles) west of Oeffelt, and a Halifax at 01:48 roughly 0.5 kilometres (0.31 miles) southwest of Wamel. Flying a specialized Junkers Ju 88 with GM-1 power boost, Meurer was credited with his 50th aerial victory over De Havilland Mosquito IV DZ458 from No. 139 Squadron on 27/28 July 1943.

=== Gruppenkommandeur ===
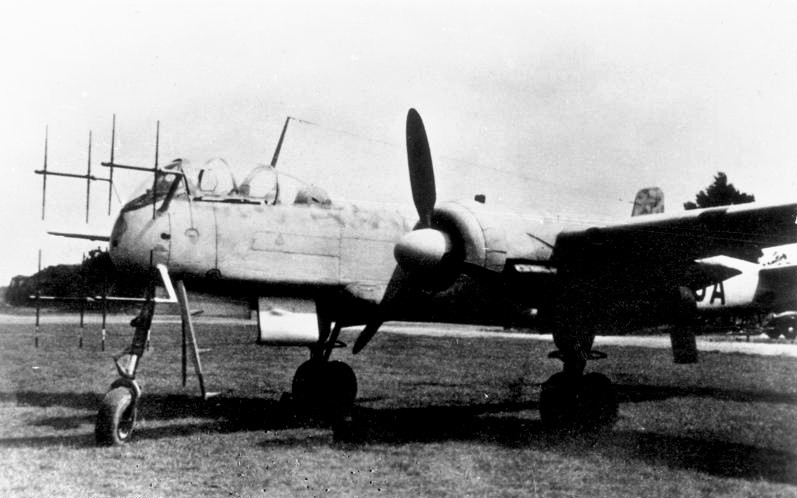
Heinkel He 219

On 2 August 1943, Meurer was awarded the Knight's Cross of the Iron Cross with Oak Leaves (Ritterkreuz des Eisernen Kreuzes mit Eichenlaub). The presentation was made by Adolf Hitler at the Wolf's Lair, Hitler's headquarters in Rastenburg, present-day Kętrzyn in Poland on 10/11 August. Five other Luftwaffe officers were presented with awards that day by Hitler, Hauptmann Egmont Prinz zur Lippe-Weißenfeld, Hauptmann Heinrich Ehrler, Oberleutnant Joachim Kirschner, Hauptmann Werner Schröer, Oberleutnant Theodor Weissenberger were also awarded the Oak Leaves, and Major Helmut Lent received the Swords to his Knight's Cross with Oak Leaves.

On 5 August 1943, Meurer was appointed Gruppenkommandeur (group commander) of II. Gruppe of Nachtjagdgeschwader 5 (NJG 5—5th Night Fighter Wing), replacing Hauptmann Rudolf Schoenert who was transferred. On 23/24 August 1943, Meurer claimed a Lancaster at 00:58 over the eastern area of Berlin and a second Lancaster at 01:38 at Fürstenberg/Havel. On the last night of August 1943, he claimed a Stirling bomber destroyed at 01:00 on 1 September in a vicinity 20 kilometres (12 miles) west-northwest of Berlin. He returned to NJG 1 on 28 September 1943 as Gruppenkommandeur of I. Gruppe. He replaced Hauptmann Hans-Dieter Frank who was killed in action. I. Gruppe flew the Heinkel He 219 and Meurer gained five victories flying this type. At 20:05 on 18/19 October 1943, he claimed a Lancaster for his 57th aerial victory at Erichshagen. Near Bühne and Haarbrück on the night of 22/23 October 1943, he claimed a Lancaster shot down at 21:20. At 20:15 on 3/4 November 1943, Meurer claimed a Halifax 14 kilometres (8.7 miles) northeast of Tilburg.

=== Battle of Berlin and death ===
In November 1943, Bomber Command initiated the aerial bombing campaign on Berlin. During the Battle of Berlin (18 November 1943 – 31 March 1944), the RAF also targeted other German cities to prevent the concentration of defences. At the start of this campaign, Meurer with his I. Gruppe were based at Venlo Airfield. Meurer was credited with his 60th aerial victory on 12/13 December 1943 for a claim made at 19:25 over a Mosquito west of Zaltbommel. The Mosquito was DZ354 from No. 105 Squadron piloted by Flying Officer Benjamin Frank Reynolds and Flying Officer John Douglass Phillips, both killed in action. On 16/17 December 1943, he claimed his 61st and 62nd victory. The 61st claim was made at 19:25 over an aircraft of unknown type and position. His 62nd claim was over a Lancaster at an unknown time and location.

On the night of 21/22 January 1944, he collided with the Lancaster W4852 LS-B, piloted by Flight Sergeant Robert Butler, roughly 20 kilometres (12 miles) east of Magdeburg. His He 219 A-0 (Werknummer 190070—factory number) "G9+BB" crashed and Meurer, his radar operator Oberfeldwebel Gerhard Scheibe, the first radio operator of the night fighter force to have received the Knight's Cross of the Iron Cross, and all seven members of the Lancaster crew, were killed in action. Meurer had been credited with 65 nocturnal victories, including 40 four-engined bombers and two Mosquitos, claimed in 130 combat missions. On 31 January 1944, Meurer was given a military funeral on the Ohlsdorf Cemetery in Hamburg.

== Summary of career ==
=== Aerial victory claims ===
According to US historian David T. Zabecki, Meurer was credited with 65 aerial victories. (Note: For a list of Luftwaffe night fighter aces see List of German World War II night fighter aces) Boiten lists him with 61 confirmed plus two further unconfirmed aerial victories. Foreman, Mathews and Parry, authors of Luftwaffe Night Fighter Claims 1939 – 1945, researched the German Federal Archives and found records for 65 nocturnal victory claims, numerically ranging from 1 to 61, 61, 65, 63 and 64. According to Bowman, Meurer shot down Mosquito IV DZ458 from No. 139 Squadron on 27/28 July 1943. This claim is not documented by Foreman, Mathews and Parry. Mathews and Foreman also published Luftwaffe Aces — Biographies and Victory Claims, listing Meurer with 62 claims.

Chronicle of aerial victories
This and the ! (exclamation mark) indicates aerial victories listed in Luftwaffe Night Fighter Claims 1939 – 1945 but not in Luftwaffe Aces — Biographies and Victory Claims.
Claim	Date	Time	Type	Location	Serial No./Squadron No.
– 9. Staffel of Nachtjagdgeschwader 1 –
1	27 March 1942	00:10	Wellington	2 km (1.2 mi) east Wichmond	
– Stab III. Gruppe of Nachtjagdgeschwader 1 –
2	31 May 1942	02:05	Hampden	3 km (1.9 mi) north Deventer	Hampden P2116/No. 14 Operational Training Unit RAF
3	3 June 1942	01:54	Halifax	near Emmerich	Lancaster R5562/No. 61 Squadron RAF
4	16 August 1942	04:17	Wellington	Rozendaal	Wellington DF666/No. 156 Squadron RAF
5	11 September 1942	00:06	Wellington	1 km (0.62 mi) west Bienen	Wellington DV890/No. 11 Operational Training Unit RAF
6	14 September 1942	03:26	Lancaster	10 km (6.2 mi) north Appeldoorn	Lancaster W4169/No. 44 Squadron RAF
7	1 October 1942	21:47	Wellington	2 km (1.2 mi) north-northeast Haldern	
8	15 October 1942	21:47	Halifax	1 km (0.62 mi) north Hellendoorn	Halifax W1108/No. 158 Squadron RAF
– 3. Staffel of Nachtjagdgeschwader 1 –
9	3 January 1943	20:23	Lancaster	20 km (12 mi) north-northeast Roermond	Lancaster W4134/No. 207 Squadron RAF
10	27 January 1943	20:53	Halifax	Handel	Halifax DT721/No. 51 Squadron RAF
11	3 February 1943	20:41	Stirling	5 km (3.1 mi) south Amersfoort	Stirling BF406/No. 218 (Gold Coast) Squadron RAF
12	14 February 1943	20:05	Halifax	50 km (31 mi) east Eindhoven	
13	14 February 1943	20:20	Halifax	north-northeast Maastricht	Halifax DT788/No. 10 Squadron RAF
14	14 February 1943	21:06	Wellington	5 km (3.1 mi) west Roermond	
15	26 February 1943	21:18	Lancaster	10 km (6.2 mi) northeast Roermond	Lancaster W4846/No. 83 Squadron RAF
16	26 February 1943	21:35	Wellington	20 km (12 mi) northeast Eindhoven	Wellington Z1599/No. 426 Squadron RCAF
17	1 March 1943	23:56	Lancaster	10 km (6.2 mi) southeast Rotterdam	Lancaster ED423/No. 50 Squadron RAF
18	5 March 1943	20:57	Halifax	west Düsseldorf	
19	5 March 1943	21:20	Wellington	4 km (2.5 mi) northwest Weeze	Wellington BK150/No. 300 Polish Bomber Squadron
20	12 March 1943	21:16	Halifax	northwest Venlo	Halifax HR692/No. 10 Squadron RAF
21	12 March 1943	21:25	Lancaster	3–5 km (1.9–3.1 mi) east Bergen	Lancaster ED449/No. 50 Squadron RAF
22	12 March 1943	21:48	Halifax	Grafwegen	
23	12 March 1943	22:25	Wellington	25 km (16 mi) northeast of 's-Hertogenbosch	
24	13 May 1943	02:10	Wellington	18 km (11 mi) east-southeast Eindhoven	
25	14 May 1943	02:31	Halifax		
26	24 May 1943	01:55	Wellington	13 km (8.1 mi) northwest Eindhoven	Wellington HE655/No. 166 Squadron RAF
27	24 May 1943	02:12	Wellington	east Essen	Wellington HZ582/No. 199 Squadron RAF
28	24 May 1943	02:33	Lancaster	32 km (20 mi) southeast Nijmegen	Lancaster W4919/No. 101 Squadron RAF
29	26 May 1943	01:24	Wellington	Oostrum	
30	26 May 1943	01:36	Lancaster	10 km (6.2 mi) southeast Roermond	
31	26 May 1943	02:08	Lancaster	5 km (3.1 mi) west Nijmegen	
32	28 May 1943	00:38	Lancaster	2 km (1.2 mi) north-northeast Barlo	
33	28 May 1943	01:30	Wellington	21 km (13 mi) southeast Wanroij	
34	30 May 1943	00:33	Halifax	5 km (3.1 mi) north-northeast Roermond	
35	30 May 1943	00:50	Wellington	12 km (7.5 mi) northeast Roermond	
36	30 May 1943	01:09	Stirling	southeast Roermond	
37	30 May 1943	01:44	Lancaster	20 km (12 mi) west Geldern	Lancaster EE123/No. 44 Squadron RAF; Peter Grattan Holt RCAF and crew KIA
38	12 June 1943	01:14	Wellington	Coesfeld	
39	12 June 1943	01:40	Halifax	Zutphen	
40	12 June 1943	01:55	Halifax	7 km (4.3 mi) north Xanten	Halifax JD143/No. 419 Squadron RCAF
41	13 June 1943	01:14	Lancaster	Beaumetz	
42	15 June 1943	01:02	Lancaster	Hünshoven	Lancaster W4936/No. 44 Squadron RAF
43	15 June 1943	01:11	Lancaster	east-southeast Sittard	Lancaster EE167/No. 460 Squadron RAF
44	15 June 1943	01:15	Lancaster	4 km (2.5 mi) west-southwest Bracht	
45	17 June 1943	00:55	Lancaster	southwest Krüchen	
46	17 June 1943	01:20	Lancaster	2 km (1.2 mi) west Braunsrath	
47	17 June 1943	01:41	Lancaster	south Boerdonk	Lancaster ED497/No. 49 Squadron RAF
48	17 June 1943	01:55	Lancaster	4 km (2.5 mi) north Bortel	Lancaster ED945/No. 103 Squadron RAF
49	22 June 1943	01:23	Lancaster	2 km (1.2 mi) west Oeffelt	
50	22 June 1943	01:48	Halifax	0.5 km (0.31 mi) southwest Wamel	
– Stab II. Gruppe of Nachtjagdgeschwader 5 –
51	24 August 1943	00:58	Lancaster	eastern part Berlin	
52	24 August 1943	01:38	Lancaster	Oranienburg/Fürstenberg	
53	1 September 1943	01:00	Lancaster	20 km (12 mi) west-northwest Berlin	
54	7 September 1943	00:40	Lancaster	south Munich	Lancaster JB177/No. 156 Squadron RAF
55	7 September 1943	00:50	Lancaster	25 km (16 mi) south Munich	Halifax JB921/No. 102 Squadron RAF
56	28 September 1943	23:20	B-17	south Hanover	
– Stab I. Gruppe of Nachtjagdgeschwader 1 –
57	18 October 1943	20:05	Lancaster	Erichshagen	Lancaster JB279/No. 103 Squadron RAF
58	22 October 1943	21:20	Lancaster	Bühne-Haarbrück	Lancaster W4357/No. 61 Squadron RAF
59	3 November 1943	20:15	Halifax	14 km (8.7 mi) northeast Tilburg	Halifax JD321/No. 77 Squadron RAF
60	12 December 1943	19:25	Mosquito	Herwijnen	Mosquito DZ354/No. 105 Squadron RAF
61!	16 December 1943	19:25	Lancaster		
62!	16/17 December 1943	—	Lancaster		
63!	1/2 January 1944	—	Lancaster		
64	22 January 1944	23:10	Halifax	Magdeburg	
65	22 January 1944	23:50	Lancaster	20 km (12 mi) southwest Magdeburg	Lancaster W4852/No. 15 Squadron RAF

=== Awards ===
- Iron Cross (1939)
  - 2nd Class (17 April 1942)
  - 1st Class (19 December 1942)
- Honour Goblet of the Luftwaffe (Ehrenpokal der Luftwaffe) on 15 March 1943 as Oberleutnant and pilot
- German Cross in Gold on 31 March 1943 as Oberleutnant in the 3./Nachtjagdgeschwader 1
- Knight's Cross of the Iron Cross with Oak Leaves
  - Knight's Cross on 16 April 1943 as Oberleutnant and Staffelkapitän of the 3./Nachtjagdgeschwader 1
  - 264th Oak Leaves on 2 August 1943 as Hauptmann and Staffelkapitän of the 3./Nachtjagdgeschwader 1
