= Werner Streib =

German general and night fighter pilot during World War II

- Born: 13 June 1911; Pforzheim, German Empire
- Died: 15 June 1986 (aged 75); Munich, West Germany
- Burial place: Munich, Ostfriedhof
- Military career
- Allegiance: Nazi Germany (to 1945); West Germany
- Branch: Army (1934–1935); Luftwaffe (1935–1945); German Air Force (1956–1966)
- Service years: 1934–1945; 1956–1966
- Rank: Oberst; Brigadegeneral
- Unit: NJG 1
- Commands: NJG 1
- Conflicts: World War II: Invasion of Poland (1939); Defense of the Reich
- Awards: Knight's Cross of the Iron Cross with Oak Leaves and Swords
- Other work: Bundeswehr

Werner Streib (13 June 1911 – 15 June 1986) was a German Luftwaffe military aviator during World War II, a night fighter ace credited with 68—one daytime and 67 nighttime—enemy aircraft shot down in about 150 combat missions. All of his nocturnal victories were claimed over the Western Front in Defense of the Reich missions against the Royal Air Force's Bomber Command.

Born in Pforzheim, Streib grew up in the Weimar Republic and Third Reich. Following graduation from school, he began military service in the Reichswehr in 1934 and in 1936, transferred to the Luftwaffe. After training at various postings, he served with Zerstörergeschwader 1 (ZG 1—1st Destroyer Wing) flying a Messerschmitt Bf 110 heavy fighter at the outbreak of World War II. On 10 May 1940, Streib claimed his first aerial victory. In June 1940, he was appointed Staffelkapitän (squadron leader) of the 2. Staffel (2nd squadron) of ZG 1. Shortly later, this squadron became 2. Staffel of Nachtjagdgeschwader 1 (NJG 1—1st Night Fighter Wing). On the night of 19/20 July, Streib claimed his first nocturnal aerial victory. In October 1940, he was appointed Gruppenkommandeur (group commander) of the I. Gruppe of NJG 1 and by end-1940 was credited with nine aerial victories. In 1943, Streib was involved in evaluating the then new Heinkel He 219. Flying the He 219, he claimed five aircraft destroyed on 11/12 June 1943. Streib was appointed Geschwaderkommodore (wing commander) of NJG 1 on 1 July 1943. On 11 March 1944, he was awarded the Knight's Cross of the Iron Cross with Oak Leaves and Swords, the highest award in the military and paramilitary forces of Nazi Germany during World War II, for 66 confirmed victories. In March 1944, he was made Inspector of Night Fighters and he would stay in this post until the end of the war.

== Early life ==
Streib, the son of a merchant, was born on 13 June 1911 in Pforzheim, at the time located in the Grand Duchy of Baden of the German Empire. Following graduation from school with his Abitur (university-preparatory high school diploma) and a commercial education in 1934, Streib joined the military service in the Reichswehr with Infanterie-Regiment 14, a regiment of the 5. Infanterie-Division based in Konstanz, as a Fahnenjunker (officer cadet). On 1 October 1935, then an Oberfähnrich (officer candidate), Streib transferred to the newly emerging Luftwaffe (air force) and was promoted to Leutnant (second lieutenant) on 1 April 1936. Streib first served as an air observer with an aerial reconnaissance unit before in 1938, he was posted to the II. Gruppe (2nd group) of Jagdgeschwader 132 "Richthofen", named after the World War I fighter ace Manfred von Richthofen. (Note: For an explanation of Luftwaffe unit designations see Organization of the Luftwaffe during World War II.) This unit was later renamed to I. Gruppe (1st group) of Zerstörergeschwader 1 (ZG 1—1st Destroyer Wing).

== World War II ==
On Friday 1 September 1939, German forces invaded Poland starting World War II in Europe. At the time, Streib was serving with the Flughafenbetriebskompanie (airport operational company) of I./ZG 1 before becoming a pilot. On 10 May 1940, the first day of the Battle of France, Streib claimed his first aerial victory. Flying a Messerschmitt Bf 110 heavy fighter, he was credited with shooting down a Royal Air Force (RAF) Bristol Blenheim bomber. For this achievement he was awarded the Iron Cross 2nd Class (Eisernes Kreuz zweiter Klasse) on 17 May 1940. On 6 June 1940, he was appointed Staffelkapitän (squadron leader) of the 2. Staffel (2nd squadron) of ZG 1. This squadron became 2. Staffel of Nachtjagdgeschwader 1 (NJG 1—1st Night Fighter Wing) on 26 June 1940.

=== Night fighter career ===
In May 1940 the creation of the Nachtjagd (night fighter force) had commenced and I. Gruppe of NJG 1 flew out of Gütersloh airfield. On the night of 19/20 July, Streib claimed his first nocturnal aerial victory over a RAF Armstrong Whitworth Whitley shot down at 02:15 near Saerbeck. (Note: According to Donnelly, this aircraft may have been Vickers Wellington L7795 from No. 9 Squadron which crashed near Osnabrück, alternative this may also have been Whitley V P5007 from No. 51 Squadron. In both cases all members of the crew were killed.) Two nights later at 01:22, Streib claimed his second nocturnal, his third overall, victory over another Whitley shot down 10 kilometers (6.2 miles) north of Münster. (Note: According to Donnelly, this aircraft was Whitley N1487 from No. 78 Squadron targeting the marshalling yards at Hamm and Soest. All members of the crew were killed.) On 30/31 August 1940, Streib claimed two aerial victories. He was credited with shooting down a Vickers Wellington at 23:24 north-northeast of Emmerich am Rhein and a Handley Page Hampden at 00:32 near Arnhem. (Note: According to Donnelly, one aircraft was Wellington T2559 from No. 214 Squadron, the other aircraft was Hampden L4079 from No. 50 Squadron. All members of the crews were killed.) On the night of 30 September to 1 October, Streib was victorious over two Wellington and one Hampden bombers. He claimed the first Wellington at 22:49 near Bersenbruck and the second at 23:35 near Menslage. The Hampden was shot down at 23:19 near Badbergen. (Note: According to Donnelly the aircraft claimed as a Hampden was Whitley T4130 from No. 10 Squadron on a mission to bomb Berlin. Two members of the crew were killed and two were taken prisoner of war.) This took his total to eight victories in overall, including seven by night and one by day. He was also awarded the Knight's Cross of the Iron Cross (Ritterkreuz des Eisernen Kreuzes) on 6 October 1940 as Oberleutnant (first lieutenant) and Staffelkapitän of the 2./NJG 1. After Wolfgang Falck, Streib was the second member of the night fighter force and first pilot to receive this distinction. On 7 October, he was promoted to Hauptmann (captain) and appointed Gruppenkommandeur (group commander) of the I. Gruppe of NJG 1.

On the night of 14/15 October, Streib was credited with the destruction of another Hampden at 03:05 northeast of Calbe, this was also his last of 1940 and ninth overall. (Note: According to Donnelly, this aircraft was Hampden X42993 from No. 50 Squadron on a mission to bomb Berlin. Two members of the crew were killed and two were taken prisoner of war.) For these achievements he received the German Cross in Gold (Deutsches Kreuz in Gold), awarded on 26 February 1941. At 22:18 on 10/11 March 1941, Streib claimed his ninth nocturnal victory when he shot down a Hampden 15 km (9.3 mi) southwest of Venlo. Four nights later, on 14/15 March 1941, a Wellington shot down at 22:32 near Helenaveen became his tenth, eleventh overall, aerial victory. On 10/11 April 1941, he was credited with shooting down a Hampden at 22:49 west of Roggel and a second Hampden at 23:02 near Ittervoort. A Wellington claimed at 23:39 on 17/18 April 1941 10 km (6.2 mi) east of Weert became his 13th, 14th overall, victory. One Whitley shot down on each night of 30 June to 1 July and 3/4 July 1941 respectively, took his total to 16 aerial victories overall. The first Whitley was claimed at 01:19 2 km (1.2 mi) northwest of Waldfeucht while the second was recorded at 02:33 3 km (1.9 mi) east of Asten. Two Wellingtons fell to his guns on the night of 15/16 July. The first aircraft was claimed at 00:54 near Someren and the second at 01:45 near Geyspers.

=== Kammhuber Line ===
A map of part of the Kammhuber Line. The 'belt' and night fighter 'boxes' are shown.

By mid-1940 by Generalmajor (Brigadier General) Josef Kammhuber had established a night air defense system dubbed the Kammhuber Line. It consisted of a series of control sectors equipped with radars and searchlights and an associated night fighter. Each sector named a Himmelbett (canopy bed) would direct the night fighter into visual range with target bombers. At 02:19 on the night of 6/7 August, Streib claimed his 18th nocturnal victory over a Whitley shot down 10 km (6.2 mi) northeast of Eindhoven. (Note: According to Bowman, this aircraft was Whitley V Z6488 from No. 51 Squadron.) Streib claimed his 20th nocturnal victory on the night of 16/17 August. At 02:05 he claimed an Avro Manchester bomber shot down 10 km (6.2 mi) northeast of Sittard and at 02:52 a Whitley bomber 2 km (1.2 mi) north of Roermond. On the night of 27/28 December, Streib claimed his last victories of 1941 taking his total to 23, including one daytime victory. At 20:15 and at 20:45, he claimed a Wellington and a Whitley, both over the Zuiderzee.

Two Wellington's claimed on 26/27 March 1942, were his first on 1942. The first Wellington was shot down at 23:51 in the vicinity of Enkhuizen and the second at 23:58 southeast of Zutphen. He again claimed two Wellington's two weeks later. On 10/11 April at 00:41, a first Wellington was shot down 15 km (9.3 mi) south Nijmegen, the second at 12 km (7.5 mi) southwest of Venlo. At 00:56, 8 km (5.0 mi) southeast of Tilburg, and at 02:05, near 's-Hertogenbosch, on the night of 30/31 May, Streib was credited with two Whitleys shot down.

Streib claimed his last victory of 1942 on the night of 20/21 December. He shot down a Wellington at 20:13, 25 km (16 mi) southeast of 's-Hertogenbosch. His first victory of 1943, his 40th nocturnal, was claimed on the night of 9/10 January when he shot down an Avro Lancaster bomber at 19:15, 8 km (5.0 mi) west of Venlo. Four nights later, he claimed two further Lancasters shot down, the first at 19:16 southwest of Apeldoorn and the second at 19:44, 15 km (9.3 mi) southwest of Hoog Soeren. On the night of 2/3 February 1943, Streib was credited with shooting down a Lancaster bomber at 21:12, 20 km (12 mi) south of Eindhoven followed by four-engines bomber of unknown type at 21:30, 15 km (9.3 mi) south of Venlo. These two claims took his total to 45 aerial victories, including one by day. On 26 February 1943, Streib was awarded the Knight's Cross of the Iron Cross with Oak Leaves (Ritterkreuz des Eisernen Kreuzes mit Eichenlaub) as Major and Gruppenkommandeur of the I./NJG 1. He was the 197th member of the German armed forces to be so honored. He received the Oak Leaves from Adolf Hitler personally at his office in the New Reich Chancellery in Berlin on 11 May 1943. During the night of the 29/30 March he shot down Wellington HE545 from No. 166 Squadron RAF. Pilot Officer James Robert Arthur Hodgson and his crew were posted missing. On the night of the 3/4 April 1943 Streib claimed a trio of Halifax bombers on an operation to attack Essen. One of the bombers was Halifax II DT723, LQ-F, crewed by Royal Canadian Air Force (RCAF) personnel from No. 504 Squadron RAF and piloted by Pilot Officer L. Lago. All the crew with the exception of Flight Sergeant W. S. Beaty survived to be taken prisoner of war.

=== Testing the Heinkel He 219 ===
Streib was involved in evaluating the then new Heinkel He 219 for its suitability as night fighter. On 25 March 1943, Streib flew He 219 V1 in mock combat against a Junkers Ju 188 E-1, piloted by Oberst Viktor von Loßberg, at the Erprobungstelle Rechlin, the primary Luftwaffe aviation service-test facility, located just south of Rechlin. In this test the He 219 proved itself to be more than 25 kilometers per hour (16 miles per hour) faster than the Ju 188. The He 219 also easily outmaneuvered the Ju 188 in this test. The theoretically greater rate of climb of the Ju 188 proved to be incorrect.

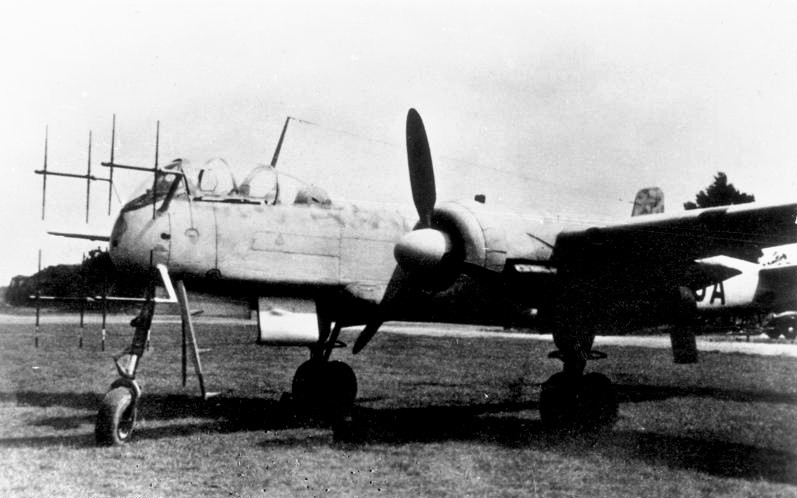
Heinkel He 219

On the night of 11/12 June 1943, Streib, together with radio operator (Bordfunker) Unteroffizier Helmut Fischer, flew the prototype version He 219 V9, with the pre-production label A-0/R2 "G9+FB" (Werknummer 190 009—factory number), in combat against the RAF and claimed five aerial victories. That night, Bomber Command had sent a force of 783 heavy bombers on an attack against Düsseldorf. Of this attack force, made up of Wellington, Handley Page Halifax, Short Stirling and Avro Lancaster bombers, 693 aircraft actually hit the target. His five victory claims included a Halifax shot down at 01:05 in location 14 km (8.7 mi) southeast of Roermond, a second Halifax shot down at 01:20 in location 2 km (1.2 mi) southwest of Rheinberg, a third Halifax shot down at 01:55 in location 3 km (1.9 mi) north of Mook, a Lancaster shot down at 02:16 in location 18 km (11 mi) southwest of Nijmegen in the center of Mill, and a fourth Halifax shot down at 02:22 in location 3 km (1.9 mi) west of Sambeek. This "ace-in-a-day" achievement took his total to 55 nocturnal aerial victories.

However, when returning to Venlo, Streib crashed the He 219 during landing. Low on fuel, Streib reported that during the landing approach the cockpit iced up, impairing his vision, necessitating an instrument approach. He activated the electrically controlled flaps and lowered the landing gear. Unnoticed by Streib, the flaps did not lock down and the electrically controlled flaps retracted themselves. Subsequently, his airspeed was too high during the final approach. Streib, misjudging his airspeed, flared the aircraft and slammed it into the runway. The resulting shockwave ruptured the tires; the starboard engine and cockpit were torn off the aircraft. Both Streib and Fischer escaped with minor injuries.

=== High command ===
At 01:30 on the night of 12/13 June, Streib was credited with the destruction of a Lancaster 45 km (28 mi) south of Doetinchem. A Stirling claimed at 01:30 on 22 June 35 km (22 mi) northwest of Venlo took his total to 57 nocturnal victories. On 24/25 June 1943, he was credited with a victory over Halifax claimed at 00:51 near Kempen. Streib was appointed Geschwaderkommodore (wing commander) of NJG 1 on 1 July 1943, succeeding Falck in this capacity. On the night of 25/26 July 1943, Streib claimed four aerial victories, the second of which his 60th nocturnal. At 00:28, he claimed to have shot down a Stirling bomber approximately 11 km (6.8 mi) northeast of Eindhoven. His second of the night and 60th nocturnal overall was claimed over a Lancaster at 00:46 about 10 km (6.2 mi) north of Helmond. The third claim that night, a Halifax was made at 01:20 in a position 6 km (3.7 mi) southeast of Oisterwijk, and the fourth, another Lancaster, at 01:42 approximately 17 km (11 mi) northeast of 's-Hertogenbosch. One of the bombers was Halifax JA855, PM-A, from No. 103 Squadron RAF. Squadron leader G. R. Carpenter was captured but only three other members survived.

On 11 March 1944, he was awarded the Knight's Cross of the Iron Cross with Oak Leaves and Swords (Ritterkreuz des Eisernen Kreuzes mit Eichenlaub und Schwertern) for 66 confirmed victories. The presentation was made by Hitler at the Berghof in Berchtesgaden on 4 April. On 23 March 1944, he was made Inspector of Night Fighters and he would stay in this post as Oberst until the end of the war. In consequence of this appointment, command of NJG 1 was given to Oberstleutnant Hans-Joachim Jabs. On 11 November, Reichsmarschall (Marshal of the Realm) Hermann Göring, in his role as commander-in-chief of the Luftwaffe, organized a meeting of high-ranking Luftwaffe officers, including Streib. The meeting, also referred to as the "Areopag" was held at the Luftkriegsakademie (air war academy) at Berlin-Gatow. This Luftwaffe version of the Greek Areopagus—a court of justice—aimed at finding solutions to the deteriorating air war situation over Germany.

Often called 'Father of the Nachtjagd' Streib helped develop the operational tactics used by the Nachtjagd during the early to mid-war years, and along with the likes of Falck made the Luftwaffe's night fighter force an effective fighting force against the RAF Bomber Command offensive. He is mentioned in the book Almost a Lifetime by John McMahon when he shot down John's Lancaster, killing all but John.

== Later life ==
After the war he worked in the grocery business before joining the Bundeswehr on 16 March 1956. Streib was asked to testify in the aftermaths of the 1961 F-84 Thunderstreak incident. For three years he commanded the pilot school A in Landsberg am Lech, equipped with the T-6 Texan. He was responsible for training the beginner pilots in the West German Air Force. Brigadegeneral Streib's military career ended with his retirement on 31 March 1966. His last position was Inspizient Fliegende Verbände (Inspector of Flying Forces). He died on 15 June 1986 in Munich and was buried at the Ostfriedhof (Eastern Cemetery) in Munich with military honors.

== Summary of career ==
=== Aerial victory claims ===
According to US historian David T. Zabecki, Streib was credited with 66 aerial victories. (Note: For a list of Luftwaffe night fighter aces see List of German World War II night fighter aces) Obermaier and Scutts list Streib with 68—one daytime and 67 nighttime—aerial victories, claimed in about 150 combat missions. Spick also states that Streib was credited with 66 aerial victories, including one by day. Boiten lists him with 65 confirmed plus one further unconfirmed aerial victory. Foreman, Parry and Mathews, authors of Luftwaffe Night Fighter Claims 1939 – 1945, researched the German Federal Archives and found records for 67 nocturnal victory claims. Mathews and Foreman also published Luftwaffe Aces — Biographies and Victory Claims, listing Streib with 66 claims, including one as a Zerstörer pilot, plus two further unconfirmed claims.

Chronicle of aerial victories
This and the ♠ (Ace of spades) indicates those aerial victories which made Streib an "ace-in-a-day", a term which designates a fighter pilot who has shot down five or more airplanes in a single day. This and the – (dash) indicates unwitnessed aerial victory claims for which Streib did not receive credit. This and the ? (question mark) indicates information discrepancies listed in Luftwaffe Night Fighter Claims 1939 – 1945 and in Luftwaffe Aces — Biographies and Victory Claims.
Claim (total)	Claim (nocturnal)	Date	Time	Type	Location	Serial No./Squadron No.
– 3. Staffel of Zerstörergeschwader 1 –
1		10 May 1940	12:00	Blenheim	Waalhaven	
– 2. Staffel of Nachtjagdgeschwader 1 –
2	1	20 July 1940	02:15	Whitley	Saerbeck	
3	2	22 July 1940	01:22	Whitley	10 km (6.2 mi) north Münster	Whitley N1487/No. 78 Squadron RAF
4	3	30 August 1940	01:22	Wellington	20 km (12 mi) north-northeast Emmerich am Rhein	Wellington T2559/No. 214 Squadron RAF
5	4	30 August 1940	23:24	Hampden	Arnhem	Hampden L4079/No. 50 Squadron RAF
6	5	30 September 1940	22:49	Wellington	Bersenbruck	
7	6	30 September 1940	23:19	Hampden	Badbergen	
8	7	30 September 1940	23:35	Wellington	Menslage	
9	8	15 October 1940	03:05	Hampden	northeast Calbe	
– Stab I. Gruppe of Nachtjagdgeschwader 1 –
10	9	10 March 1941	22:18	Hampden	15 km (9.3 mi) southwest Venlo	
11	10	14 March 1941	22:32	Wellington	Helenaveen	
12	11	10 April 1941	22:49	Hampden	west Roggel	
13	12	10 April 1941	23:02	Hampden	Ittervoort	
14	13	17 April 1941	23:39	Hampden	10 km (6.2 mi) east Weert	Wellington R1599/No. 311 Squadron RAF
15	14	1 July 1941	01:19	Whitley	2 km (1.2 mi) northwest Waldfeucht	
16	15	4 July 1941	01:19	Whitley	3 km (1.9 mi) east Asten	
17	16	16 July 1941	01:19	Wellington	Someren	
18	17	16 July 1941	01:45	Wellington	Geyspers	
19	18	7 August 1941	02:19	Whitley	10 km (6.2 mi) northeast Eindhoven	Whitley Z6488/No. 51 Squadron RAF
20	19	17 August 1941	02:19	Manchester	10 km (6.2 mi) northeast Sittard	
21	20	17 August 1941	02:19	Whitley	2 km (1.2 mi) north Roermond	
22	21	27 December 1941	20:15	Wellington	Zuiderzee	
23	22	27 December 1941	20:45	Whitley	Zuiderzee	
—	23? (Note: According to Luftwaffe Aces — Biographies and Victory Claims, this claim was unconfirmed while Luftwaffe Night Fighter Claims 1939 – 1945 confirm this claim.)	26 March 1942	23:51	Wellington	Enkhuizen	
—	24?	26 March 1942	23:58	Wellington	southeast Zutphen	
24	25	11 April 1942	00:41	Wellington	15 km (9.3 mi) south Nijmegen	
25	26	11 April 1942	00:49	Wellington	12 km (7.5 mi) southwest Venlo	Wellington R1230/No. 304 Polish Bomber Squadron
26	27	31 May 1942	00:56	Whitley	15 km (9.3 mi) southeast Tilburg	
27	28	31 May 1942	02:05	Whitley	's-Hertogenbosch	
28	29	2 June 1942	00:46	Wellington	5 km (3.1 mi) south-southeast Venlo	
29	30	3 June 1942	00:46	Wellington	5 km (3.1 mi) west Viersen	
30	31	1 August 1942	00:35	Blenheim	15 km (9.3 mi) south-southeast Kevelaer	Blenheim V6432/No. 18 Squadron RAF
31	32	1 August 1942	01:44	Wellington	north Stokkem	
32	33	1 August 1942	02:28	Wellington	12 km (7.5 mi) southwest Venlo	
33	34	6 August 1942	01:18	Halifax	15 km (9.3 mi) north Eindhoven	
34	35	27 August 1942	23:57	Wellington	Eindhoven	
35	36	28 August 1942	01:04	Stirling	Eichem	
36	37	11 September 1942	00:34	Wellington	20 km (12 mi) east 's-Hertogenbosch	
37	38	17 September 1942	01:12	Wellington	7 km (4.3 mi) southeast Eindhoven	
38	39	20 December 1942	20:13	Wellington	25 km (16 mi) southeast 's-Hertogenbosch	
39	40	9 January 1943	19:15	Lancaster	8 km (5.0 mi) west Venlo	Lancaster R5738/No. 97 Squadron RAF
40	41	13 January 1943	19:16	Lancaster	southwest Apeldoorn	Lancaster W4261/No. 106 Squadron RAF
41	42	13 January 1943	19:44	Lancaster	15 km (9.3 mi) southwest Hoog Soeren	
42	43	2 February 1943	21:12	Lancaster	20 km (12 mi) south Eindhoven	Lancaster ED440/No. 49 Squadron RAF
43	44	2 February 1943	21:30	four-engined bomber	15 km (9.3 mi) southwest Venlo	Lancaster ED488/No. 50 Squadron RAF
44	45	29 March 1943	23:15	Wellington	north Arnhem	Wellington HE545/No. 166 Squadron RAF
45	46	3 April 1943	22:52	Halifax	20 km (12 mi) west Arnhem	
46	47	3 April 1943	23:00	Halifax	northwest Kleve	Halifax DT808/No. 405 (Vancouver) Squadron RCAF
47	48	3 April 1943	23:30	Halifax	43 km (27 mi) north Roermond	Halifax DT635/No. 158 Squadron RAF
48	49	9 April 1943	23:25	Halifax	17 km (11 mi) northeast 's-Hertogenbosch	
49	50	28 May 1943	23:25	Lancaster	18 km (11 mi) northwest Arnhem	
50	51♠	12 June 1943	01:05	Halifax	14 km (8.7 mi) southeast Roermond	Lancaster W4983/No. 467 Squadron RAAF
51	52♠	12 June 1943	01:20	Halifax	2 km (1.2 mi) southwest Rheinberg	Halifax JB972/No. 408 Squadron RCAF
52	53♠	12 June 1943	01:55	Halifax	3 km (1.9 mi) north Mook	Halifax HR719/No. 158 Squadron RAF
53	54♠	12 June 1943	02:16	Lancaster	18 km (11 mi) southwest Nijmegen	Lancaster DS647/No. 115 Squadron RAF
54	55♠	12 June 1943	02:22	Halifax	3 km (1.9 mi) west Sambeek	Halifax W7932/No. 78 Squadron RAF
55	56	13 June 1943	01:30	Lancaster	45 km (28 mi) south Doetinchem	
56	57	22 June 1943	01:30	Stirling	35 km (22 mi) northwest Venlo	
57	58	25 June 1943	00:51	Halifax	Kempen	Halifax HR816/No. 405 (Vancouver) Squadron RCAF
– Stab of Nachtjagdgeschwader 1 –
58	59	26 July 1943	00:28	Stirling	11 km (6.8 mi) northeast Eindhoven	Stirling EE906/No. 620 Squadron RAF
59	60	26 July 1943	00:46	Lancaster	10 km (6.2 mi) north Helmond	
60	61	26 July 1943	01:20	Halifax	6 km (3.7 mi) southeast Oisterwijk	Halifax JD207/No. 10 Squadron RAF
61	62	26 July 1943	01:42	Lancaster	17 km (11 mi) northeast 's-Hertogenbosch	Lancaster ED734/No. 156 Squadron RAF
62	63	30 July 1943	01:45	Halifax	25 km (16 mi) northwest Stade	
63	64	24 August 1943	01:23	Halifax	Heiligensee	Halifax HR944/No. 158 Squadron RAF
64	65	20 September 1943	01:01	Halifax	Zenderen southeast Eindhoven	
65	66	4 December 1943	02:15	Lancaster	Braunschweig	Lancaster DS733/No. 426 (Thunderbird) Squadron RCAF
66	67	4 December 1943	02:50	Lancaster	near Lingen	

=== Awards ===
- Wound Badge in Black
- Front Flying Clasp of the Luftwaffe for Night Fighters in Gold
- Combined Pilots-Observation Badge
- Iron Cross (1939)
  - 2nd Class (17 May 1940)
  - 1st Class (20 June 1940)
- German Cross in Gold on 26 February 1942 as Hauptmann in the I./Nachtjagdgeschwader 1
- Knight's Cross of the Iron Cross with Oak Leaves and Swords
  - Knight's Cross on 6 October 1940 as Oberleutnant and Staffelkapitän of the 2./Nachtjagdgeschwader 1
  - 197th Oak Leaves on 26 February 1943 as Major and Gruppenkommandeur of the I./Nachtjagdgeschwader 1
  - 54th Swords on 11 March 1944 as Major and Geschwaderkommodore of Nachtjagdgeschwader 1

== Notes ==
Military offices
Preceded by Oberst Wolfgang Falck	Commander of Nachtjagdgeschwader 1; 1 July 1943 – March 1944	Succeeded by Oberstleutnant Hans-Joachim Jabs
