= Sambeek =

- Village
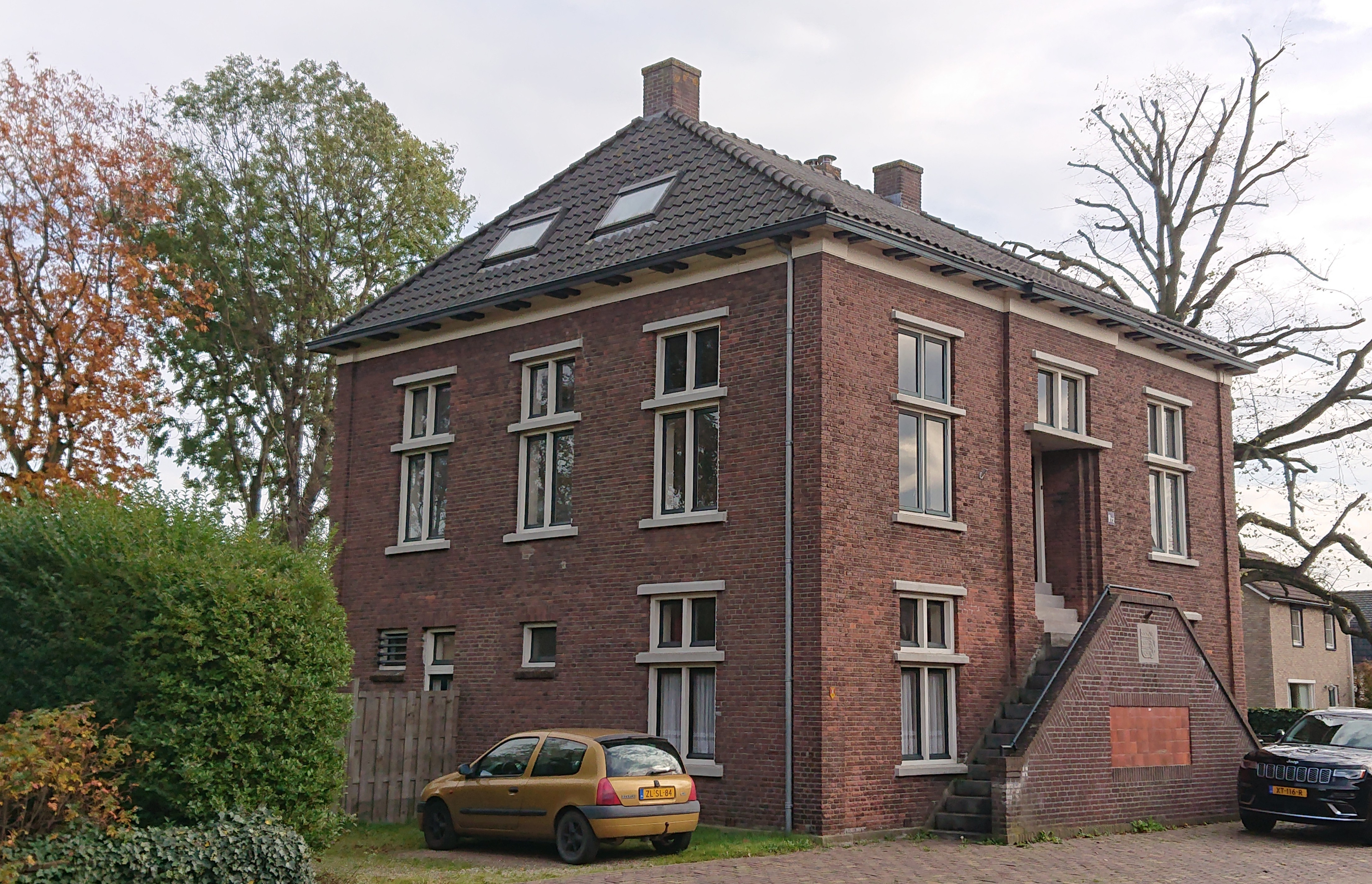
- Former town hall

- Location in the province of North Brabant in the Netherlands Sambeek (Netherlands)
- Coordinates: 51°38′N 5°57′E
- Country: Netherlands
- Province: North Brabant
- Municipality: Land van Cuijk

Area
  - Total: 8.72 km^{2} (3.37 sq mi)
- Elevation: 12–15 m (39–49 ft)

Population (2024)
  - Total: 2,514
  - Density: 288/km^{2} (747/sq mi)
- Time zone: UTC+1 (CET)
  - Summer (DST): UTC+2 (CEST)
- Postal code: 5836
- Dialing code: 0485

Sambeek is a village in southern Netherlands. It is located in the former municipality of Boxmeer, North Brabant. Since 2022, it has been part of the new municipality of Land van Cuijk.

== History ==
Sambeek is a linear settlement which developed on the river bank of the Maas in the Early Middle Ages.

The tower of Sambeek is, with its height of 50 meters, the centre of the village. The oldest part of the tower dates from 1486. This tower was a part of the local Roman Catholic church, which was blown up by the Germans in the Second World War. Their plan to blow up the tower failed, it was only slightly damaged. The St John the Baptist Church was built as the replacement of the destroyed church in 1952, but is detached from the tower.

The thickest lime tree in the Netherlands stands in the southern part of Sambeek. Its age is estimated at 500.

The former Redemptorist monastery was founded in 1874. In 1882, a wing with chapel was added in Renaissance Revival style.

Sambeek was home to 703 people in 1840. It was an independent municipality until 1942, when the municipality was divided between Oploo, Sint Anthonis en Ledeacker and Vierlingsbeek. The village was severely damaged in 1944 during World War II. Sambeek became part of the municipality of Land van Cuijk in 2022.

== Gallery ==
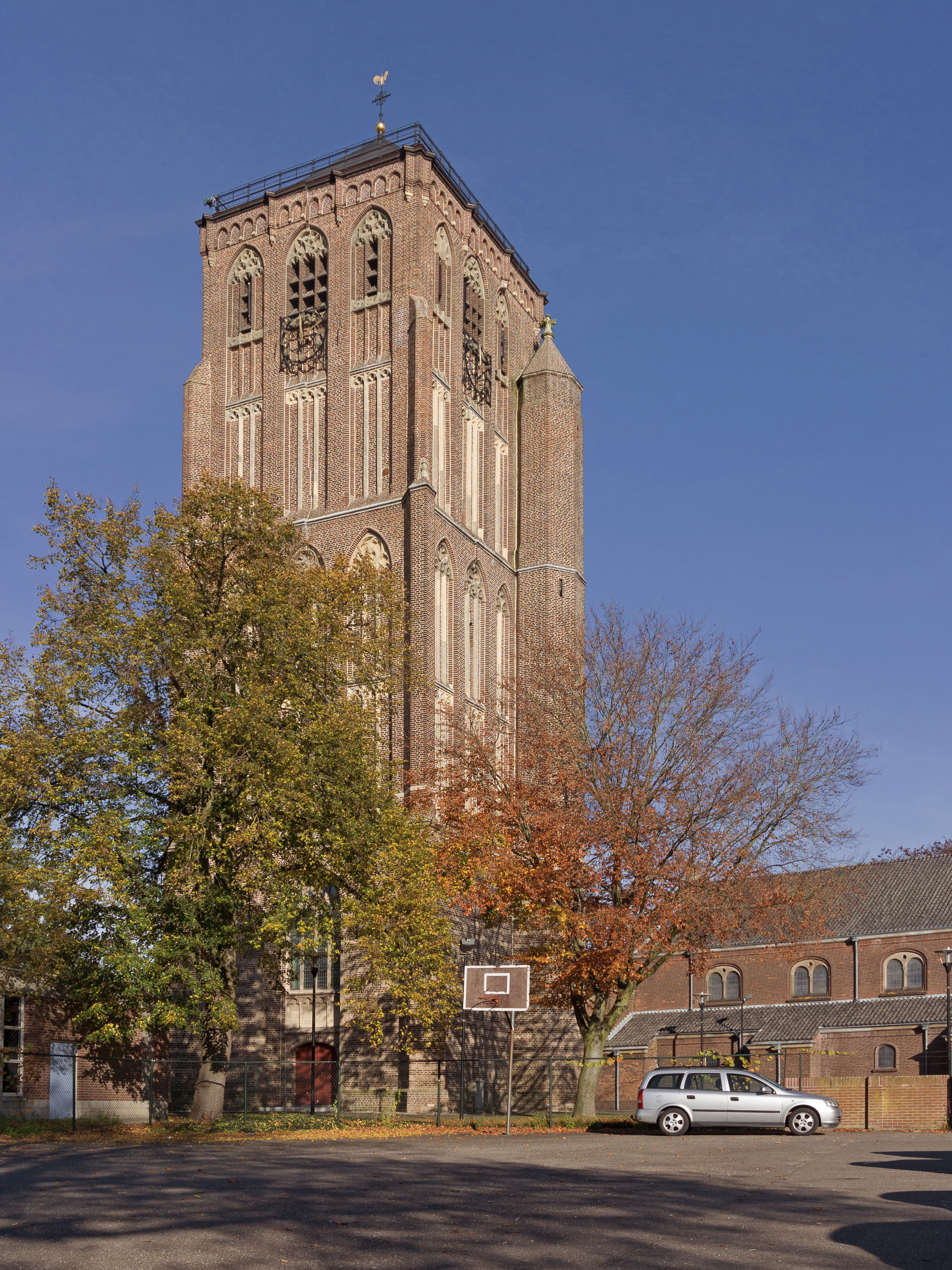
Churchtower (St John the Baptist church)

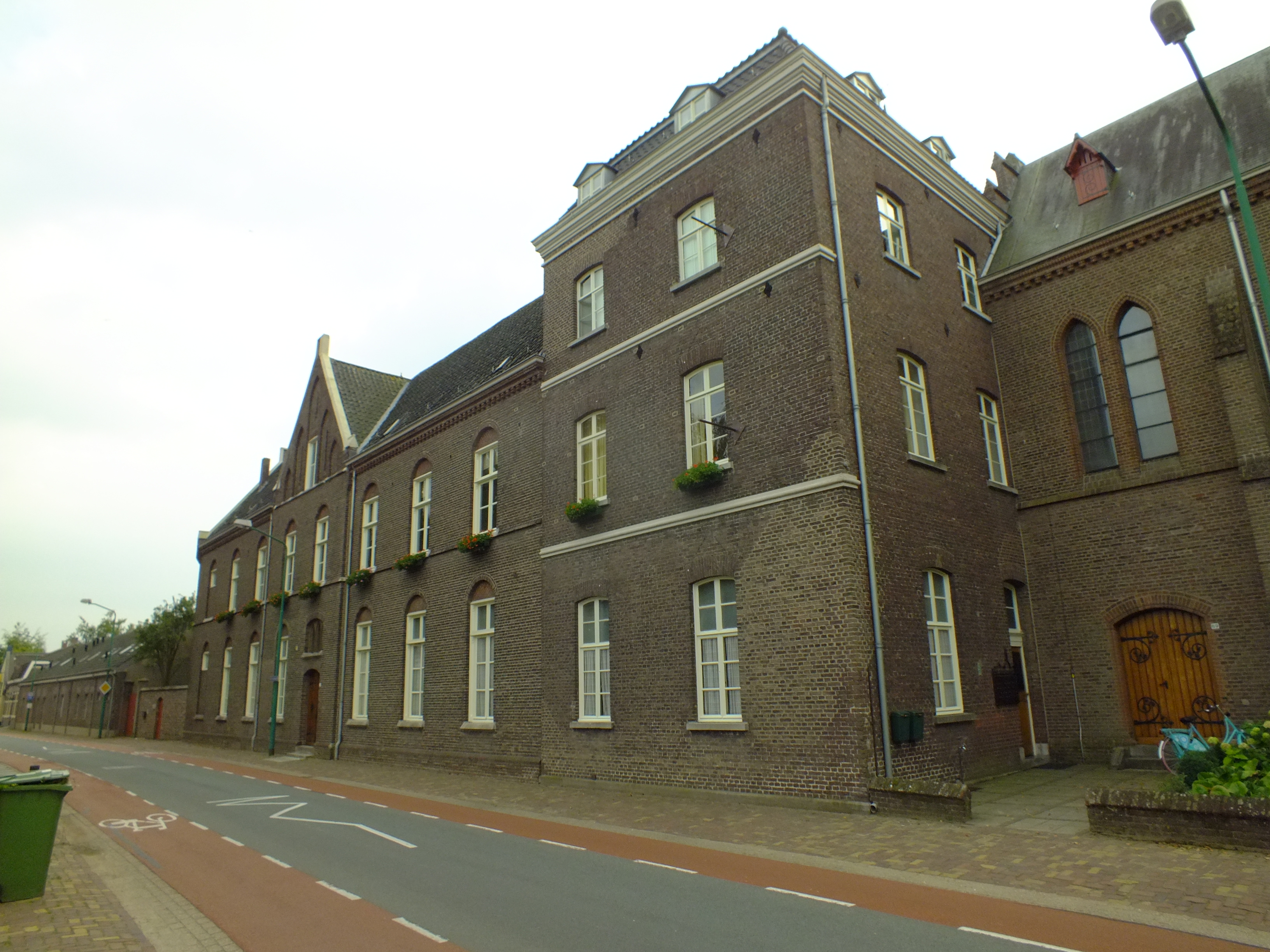
Former monastery of Sambeek

The lime tree

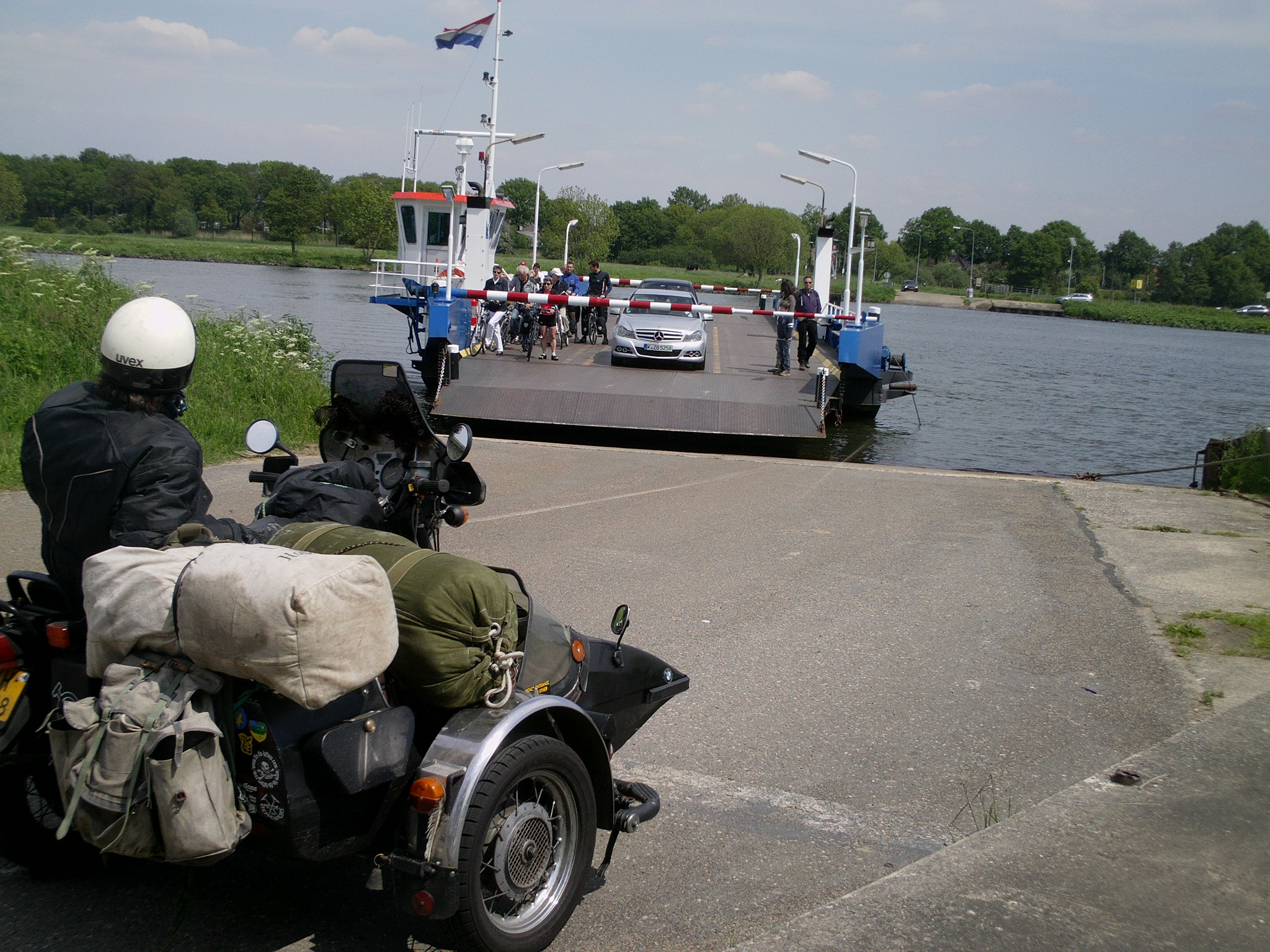
Ferry across the Meuse

In January 2024, the construction began of the 'Duvelshof'. It replaced the St John the Baptist Church and is as of October 2024, completed.
