= Lothar Linke =

German officer and fighter pilot during World War II (1909–1943)

- Born: 23 October 1909; Liegnitz
- Died: 14 May 1943 (aged 33); Lemmer, Netherlands
- Burial place: Ysselsteyn German war cemetery
- Military career
- Allegiance: Nazi Germany
- Branch: Luftwaffe
- Service years: 1934–1943
- Rank: Oberleutnant (first lieutenant)
- Units: ZG 76, NJG 1, NJG 2
- Commands: 12./NJG 1
- Conflicts: World War II: Norwegian Campaign; Defense of the Reich
- Awards: Knight's Cross of the Iron Cross

Lothar Linke (23 October 1909 – 14 May 1943) was a German Luftwaffe night fighter pilot and recipient of the Knight's Cross of the Iron Cross during World War II. Linke claimed 27 aerial victories, 24 of them at night. On 14 May 1943 Linke and his crew were forced to bail out after engine failure of their Messerschmitt Bf 110. He struck the tail end of the plane and was killed. On 19 September 1943, he was posthumously awarded the Knight's Cross.

== Early life and career ==
Linke was born on 23 October 1909 in Liegnitz, present-day Legnica, at the time in the Province of Silesia of the German Empire. He was the son of a train driver who had died in 1924. Linke attended the Volksschule (elementary school) in Liegnitz from 1916 to 1919 and the Oberrealschule (secondary school) from 1919 to 1927, also in Liegnitz. From April 1927 to April 1928, he then attended a private school in Liegnitz. Linke joined the military service on 1 March 1934, serving with the 3. Eskadron (3rd squadron) of the Fahr-Abteilung (driving department) in Rendsburg.

Linke transferred to the Luftwaffe and on 24 July 1939 was posted to 3. Staffel (3rd squadron) of Zerstörergeschwader 76 (ZG 76—76th Destroyer Wing). At the time, the Staffel was commanded by Hauptmann Josef Gutmann and was subordinated to I. Gruppe (1st group) of ZG 76 headed by Hauptmann Günther Reinicke. Based in Olmütz, present-day Olomouc in the Czech Republic, the Gruppe was equipped with the Messerschmitt Bf 110 heavy fighter. Linke was promoted to Feldwebel (sergeant) of the Reserves on 25 August 1939.

== World War II ==
World War II in Europe began on Friday 1 September 1939 when German forces invaded Poland. On 19 April 1940, Linke contributed to the destruction of the Bristol Blenheim bomber P4906 from No. 107 Squadron. The bomber was on a mission to Stavanger, Norway and was shot down. On 29 May during the Battle of Dunkirk, he claimed two Hawker Hurricane fighters shot down. Linke was promoted to Oberfeldwebel (staff or master sergeant) of the Reserves on 1 July 1940.

=== Night fighter career ===
A map of part of the Kammhuber Line. The 'belt' and night fighter 'boxes' are shown.

Following the 1939 aerial Battle of the Heligoland Bight, Royal Air Force (RAF) attacks shifted to the cover of darkness, initiating the Defence of the Reich campaign. By mid-1940, Generalmajor (Brigadier General) Josef Kammhuber had established a night air defense system dubbed the Kammhuber Line. It consisted of a series of control sectors equipped with radars and searchlights and an associated night fighter. Each sector named a Himmelbett (canopy bed) would direct the night fighter into visual range with target bombers. In 1941, the Luftwaffe started equipping night fighters with airborne radar such as the Lichtenstein radar. This airborne radar did not come into general use until early 1942.

With the expansion of the night fighter force, a newly formed II. Gruppe (2nd group) of Nachtjagdgeschwader 1 (NJG 1—1st Night Fighter Wing) was created from I. Gruppe of ZG 76 on 7 September 1940. In consequence, Linke became a night fighter pilot with II. Gruppe of NJG 1, serving with 6. Staffel. On 18 January 1941, Linke's commanding officer, Oberleutnant Helmut Lent, nominated Linke for a promotion to Leutnant (second lientenant). The nomination was supported by the Gruppenkommandeur (group commander) of II. Gruppe, Hauptmann Walter Ehle, and the Geschwaderkommodore (wing commander) of NJG 1, Major Wolfgang Falck. On 1 March 1941, the nomination was approved by the Luftwaffe Personnel Office and Linke became an officer.

Linke claimed his first nocturnal aerial victory on the night of 11/12 May 1941 over a Vickers Wellington bomber. On 1 November 1941, II. Gruppe of Nachtjagdgeschwader 2 (NJG 2—2nd Night Fighter Wing) was expanded from 4. Staffel of NJG 2, the Staffel had its origin from 1. Staffel of Zerstörergeschwader 2, and transfers from 4. and 6. Staffel of NJG 1. In consequence, Linke's Staffel became the 5. Staffel of NJG 2.

On 25/26 June 1942 during the third thousand-bomber raid which targeted Bremen, Linke claimed a Short Stirling bomber shot down. In the night of 26/27 July, he shot down Avro Lancaster bomber R5748 from No. 106 Squadron. On 13/14 September, he was credited with shooting down Wellington HD991 from No. 22 Operational Training Unit. On 1 October, II. Gruppe of NJG 2 became IV. Gruppe of NJG 1 at Leeuwarden. By end 1942, Ruhl was credited with eleven nocturnal aerial victories.

=== Squadron leader and death ===
Linke was appointed Staffelkapitän (squadron leader) of the 12. Staffel of NJG 1 on 27 February 1943. He succeeded Hauptmann Ludwig Becker who had been killed in action the day before. The Staffel was subordinated to IV. Gruppe of NJG 1 commanded by then Major Lent. On 12 April 1943, Linke was awarded the German Cross in Gold (Deutsches Kreuz in Gold). On 20/21 April, Linke shot down de Havilland Mosquito from DZ386 from No. 139 Squadron.

On the night of 4/5 May, RAF Bomber Command dispatched 596 aircraft on an attack against Dortmund, losing 31 aircraft. Linke claimed two Handley Page Halifax, one Lancaster and one Wellington bomber shot down. On the night of 12/13 May, Bomber Command sent 238 Lancaster, 142 Halifax, 112 Wellington, 70 Stirling and ten Mosquito bombers on a raid against Duisburg-Ruhrort, one of the bombing of Duisburg in World War II missions. The RAF lost 34 aircraft on this mission. That night, Linke claimed three aerial victories, two Lancaster and one Halifax bomber, his last claims.

On 14 May during the Battle of the Ruhr, Linke was killed in a flying accident when his Bf 110 G-4 (Werknummer 4857—factory number) suffered engine failure. He and his radio operator Oberfeldwebel Walter Czybulka bailed out. While Czybulka landed with some injuries, Linke collided with the tail section of his aircraft and was killed. His aircraft had received combat damage from Halifax BB252 from No. 10 Squadron. Posthumously, Linke was awarded the Knight's Cross of the Iron Cross (Ritterkreuz des Eisernes Kreuzes) on 19 September 1943. Linke is buried at the German War Cemetery Ysselsteyn (Block AR—Row 4—Grave 92) at Venray.

== Summary of career ==
=== Aerial victory claims ===
According to Spick, Linke was credited with 27 aerial victories claimed in over 100 combat missions. This number includes 24 aerial victories claimed during nocturnal combat missions and three during daytime operations. Boiten also lists him with 27 aerial victories, 24 by night and three by day. Foreman, Parry and Mathews, authors of Luftwaffe Night Fighter Claims 1939 – 1945, researched the German Federal Archives and found records for 25 nocturnal victory claims, not documenting those aerial victories claimed as a Zerstörer pilot. Mathews and Foreman also published Luftwaffe Aces – Biographies and Victory Claims, listing Linke with 27 claims, including two as a Zerstörer pilot.

Chronicle of aerial victories
Claim	Date	Time	Type	Location	Serial No./Squadron No.
– 5. Staffel of Zerstörergeschwader 76 –
1	29 May 1940	14:15	Hurricane	English Channel, off Dunkirk	
2	29 May 1940	14:19	Hurricane	English Channel, off Dunkirk	
– 6. Staffel of Nachtjagdgeschwader 1 –
3	12 May 1941	01:16	Wellington	southeast of Estenfeld southeast of Ostenfeld	
– 4. Staffel of Nachtjagdgeschwader 1 –
4	25 July 1941	23:57	Hampden	Schiermonnikoog	Hampden AD835/No. 83 Squadron RAF
– 5. Staffel of Nachtjagdgeschwader 2 –
5	12 March 1942	23:44	Whitley	north of Terschelling	Whitley Z9293/No. 77 Squadron RAF
6	22 April 1942	11:00	Hudson	west-northwest of Texel	
7	26 April 1942	00:04	Hampden	northwest of Ameland	Hampden P5330/No. 420 Squadron RCAF
8	26 June 1942	01:32	Stirling	northeast of Wieringen	Stirling W7442/No. 1651 Conversion Unit RAF
9	27 July 1942	02:05	Lancaster	20 km (12 mi) east-southeast of Leeuwarden	Lancaster R5748/No. 106 Squadron RAF
10	5 September 1942	04:03	Wellington	north of Vlieland	Wellington Z1214/No. 142 Squadron RAF
11	14 September 1942	02:54	Wellington	Zuiderzee	
– Stab of Nachtjagdgeschwader 1 –
12	22 November 1942	21:54	Ventura	25 km (16 mi) north of Terschelling	Hudson EW903/No. 320 (Netherlands) Squadron RAF
– 12. Staffel of Nachtjagdgeschwader 1 –
13	17 December 1942	21:18	Halifax	north of Petten	Lancaster W4382/No. 50 Squadron RAF
14	9 January 1943	18:22	Halifax	Schiermonnikoog	Halifax BB252/No. 10 Squadron RAF
15	3 February 1943	22:19	Wellington	25 km (16 mi) west of Vlieland	Wellington BK511/No. 300 Polish Bomber Squadron
16	3 February 1943	22:34	Halifax	west of Vlieland	
17	3 March 1943	22:21	Halifax	15 km (9.3 mi) northwest of Ameland	Halifax W7678/No. 76 Squadron RAF
18	5 March 1943	22:52	Wellington	west of Texel	Wellington BK401/No. 426 Squadron RCAF
19	21 April 1943	02:07	Mosquito	east of Middenmeer	Mosquito DZ386/No. 139 Squadron RAF
20	27 April 1943	03:36	Wellington	Bergen aan Zee	Wellington HE737/No. 429 Squadron RCAF
21	5 May 1943	00:58	Wellington	7 km (4.3 mi) east-southeast of Meppel	Wellington HE530/No. 466 Squadron RAAF
22	5 May 1943	01:14	Halifax	1 km (0.62 mi) south of Workum	Halifax JB898/No. 408 Squadron RCAF
23	5 May 1943	01:40	Lancaster	southeast of Utrecht	Lancaster W4888/No. 101 Squadron RAF
24	5 May 1943	02:10	Halifax	southeast of Vlieland	
25	13 May 1943	02:02	Halifax	4 km (2.5 mi) southeast of Harlingen	Halifax DT645/No. 51 Squadron RAF
26	13 May 1943	23:22	Lancaster	3 km (1.9 mi) north of Lemmer	Lancaster W4981/No. 83 Squadron RAF
27	13 May 1943	23:51	Lancaster	13 km (8.1 mi) west of Sneek	Lancaster ED589/No. 9 Squadron RAF

=== Awards ===
- Iron Cross (1939) 2nd and 1st Class
- Honor Goblet of the Luftwaffe on 25 January 1943 as Leutnant and pilot
- German Cross in Gold on 12 April 1943 as Leutnant in the 12./Nachtjagdgeschwader 1
- Knight's Cross of the Iron Cross on 19 September 1943 as Oberleutnant and Staffelführer of the 12./Nachtjagdgeschwader 1 (Note: According to Scherzer as Staffelkapitän of the 12./Nachtjagdgeschwader 1.)
