= Ludwig Becker (pilot) =

German World War II flying ace (1911–1943)

Robert-Ludwig Becker
- Born: 22 August 1911; Dortmund-Aplerbeck, Kingdom of Prussia, German Empire
- Died: 26 February 1943 (aged 31); North Sea, off Schiermonnikoog, German-occupied Netherlands
- Cause of death: Killed in action
- Military career
- Allegiance: Nazi Germany
- Branch: Luftwaffe
- Service years: 1939–1943
- Rank: Hauptmann (captain)
- Unit: NJG 1
- Commands: 12./NJG 1
- Conflicts: See battles World War II: Battle of France; Defense of the Reich †
- Awards: Knight's Cross of the Iron Cross with Oak Leaves

Robert-Ludwig Becker (22 August 1911 – 26 February 1943) was a German Luftwaffe military aviator during World War II, a night fighter ace credited with 44 aerial victories claimed in 165 combat missions, making him one of the more successful nocturnal fighter pilots in the Luftwaffe. (Note: For a list of Luftwaffe night fighter aces see List of German World War II night fighter aces.) All of his victories were claimed over the Western Front in Defense of the Reich missions against the Royal Air Force's (RAF) Bomber Command.

Born in Dortmund-Aplerbeck, Becker grew up in the Weimar Republic and Nazi Germany. Following graduation from school and university, he joined the military service in 1934. In 1935, he left the military and worked as a civilian pilot and flight instructor. In August 1939, he was again drafted into service and with Zerstörergeschwader 26 (ZG 26–26th Destroyer Wing), flying a Messerschmitt Bf 110 heavy fighter during the Battle of France. In June 1940, the Luftwaffe created its first night fighter wing, Nachtjagdgeschwader 1 (NJG 1–1st Night Fighter Wing), and Becker transferred to this unit. There he claimed his first nocturnal aerial victory on the night of 16/17 October 1940, the first ground-radar controlled victory by the Luftwaffe. His second aerial victory on 8/9 August was the first airborne-radar assisted claim by the Luftwaffe. Becker was appointed squadron leader of 6. Staffel (1st squadron) of Nachtjagdgeschwader 2 (NJG 2–2nd Night Fighter Wing) in December 1941. On 1 July 1942, he was awarded the Knight's Cross of the Iron Cross after his 25th aerial victory.

In October 1942, Becker was given command of 12. Staffel of NJG 1 and was awarded the Knight's Cross of the Iron Cross with Oak Leaves on 26 February 1943. That day, he was killed in action on a daytime intercept mission against the United States Army Air Forces over the North Sea.

== Early life and career ==
Becker was born on 22 August 1911 in Dortmund-Aplerbeck in the Province of Westphalia, a province of the Kingdom of Prussia. He was the first son of master builder Reinhold Becker. (Note: His younger brother Reinhold Becker, a Oberleutnant of the Reserves in III./Gebirgsjäger-Regiment 136 of the 2nd Mountain Division, was killed in action on 8 April 1942.) He graduated from a humanities-oriented Gymnasium in Dortmund, a secondary school, with his diploma (Abitur) at Easter 1930. From 1930 to 1936, Becker studied jurisprudence and economics at the University of Münster and at the Friedrich Wilhelm University in Berlin. While at university, Becker became interested in flying and took courses in aircraft manufacturing and other aeronautical classes. He then joined the German Student Corps, cofounded the "academic flying group" and joined the German Air Sports Association as a member of the SA-Fliegersturm in Münster, and later as a member of the National Socialist Flyers Corps (NSFK).

The "academic flying group" built a glider aircraft and in 1933, Becker attended the gliding schools in Rossitten, present-day Rybachy in the Kaliningrad Oblast, and Grunau, present-day Jeżów Sudecki in the Lower Silesian Voivodeship. He volunteered for military service on 1 March 1934 and was trained as fighter pilot at the Jagdfliegerschule in Schleißheim and as a dive bomber pilot in Schwerin. (Note: Flight training in the Luftwaffe progressed through the levels A1, A2 and B1, B2, referred to as A/B flight training. A training included theoretical and practical training in aerobatics, navigation, long-distance flights and dead-stick landings. The B courses included high-altitude flights, instrument flights, night landings and training to handle the aircraft in difficult situations. For pilots destined to fly multi-engine aircraft, the training was completed with the Luftwaffe Advanced Pilot's Certificate (Erweiterter Luftwaffen-Flugzeugführerschein), also known as the C-Certificate.) Becker also received training in instrument flight and handling an aircraft in adverse weather conditions. On 12 October 1935, he was discharged from the military holding the rank of Unteroffizier (subordinate officer) of the Reserves. He then worked for the Luftwaffe as a civilian pilot and flight instructor at the airfield in Münster-Loddenheide. Following further training at the Deutsche Forschungsanstalt für Segelflug (German Institute for Glider Research), Becker was made the head flight instructor for gliding and an official expert witness.

In parallel, Becker frequently participated in military exercises. While serving with 3. Staffel (3rd squadron) of Jagdgeschwader 134 "Horst Wessel", (Note: For an explanation of Luftwaffe unit designations see Organization of the Luftwaffe during World War II.) he was promoted to Feldwebel (staff sergeant) of the reserves on 1 June 1937 and to Leutnant in the reserves on 1 February 1938. On 25 August 1939, Becker was officially called into military service of the Luftwaffe, joining I. Gruppe (1st group) of Zerstörergeschwader 26 (ZG 26–26th Destroyer Wing) based in Dortmund.

== World War II ==
World War II in Europe had begun on Friday 1 September 1939 when German forces invaded Poland. Until 14 September, Becker flew with 3. Staffel of ZG 26. This unit was equipped with the Messerschmitt Bf 109 and flew fighter protection from Varel. On 28 October, Becker was transferred to Hanover, later to Wunstorf and Oldenburg where the newly formed 10. Staffel of ZG 26 for night fighting was being formed. From 29 October to 16 December 1939, Becker then attended the Luftwaffe communication school in Halle (Saale). Following his return to 3./ZG 26, the unit was converted to the Messerschmitt Bf 110 heavy fighter. Becker was transferred to the 14.(Z) Staffel, a destroyer squadron, of Lehrgeschwader 1 (LG 1–1st Demonstration Wing) on 24 April 1940. With this unit Becker participated in the Battle of France. He flew 33 combat missions during this campaign for which he was awarded the Iron Cross 2nd Class (Eisernes Kreuz 2. Klasse), which was presented to him on 3 July 1940.

=== Night fighter career ===
A map of part of the Kammhuber Line. The 'belt' and night fighter 'boxes' are shown.

Following the 1939 aerial Battle of the Heligoland Bight, RAF attacks shifted to the cover of darkness, initiating the Defence of the Reich campaign. By mid-1940, Generalmajor (Brigadier General) Josef Kammhuber had established a night air defense system dubbed the Kammhuber Line. It consisted of a series of control sectors equipped with radars and searchlights and an associated night fighter. Each sector named a Himmelbett (canopy bed) would direct the night fighter into visual range with target bombers. In 1941, the Luftwaffe started equipping night fighters with airborne radar such as the Lichtenstein radar. This airborne radar did not come into general use until early 1942.

After the armistice with France, Becker was transferred to the 2.(J) Staffel of Nachtjagdgeschwader 1 (NJG 1–1st Night Fighter Wing), initially based at Düsseldorf and Gütersloh, and then to Arnhem-Deelen airfield where he was appointed technical officer. Becker flew his first aerial combat mission on 30 August 1940. The mission resulted in the loss of the aircraft near Winterswijk, while he and his radio operator managed to save themselves with the parachute.

His first victory was Vickers Wellington L7844 KX-T on the night of 16/17 October 1940. Becker was flying a Dornier Do 17 Z-10 equipped with a gun-camera. The victory recorded the demise of the No. 311 (Czechoslovak) Squadron aircraft piloted by Pilot Officer Bohumil Landa and three of his Czech crew. It was also the first ground radar-controlled "Dunkle Nachtjagd" (DuNaJa—dark night fighting, without search lights) victory of the war. Becker and Staub were vectored to the target by Leutnant Hermann Diehl, a Luftwaffe communication officer who had begun experimenting with a Freya radar on Wangerooge in 1939.

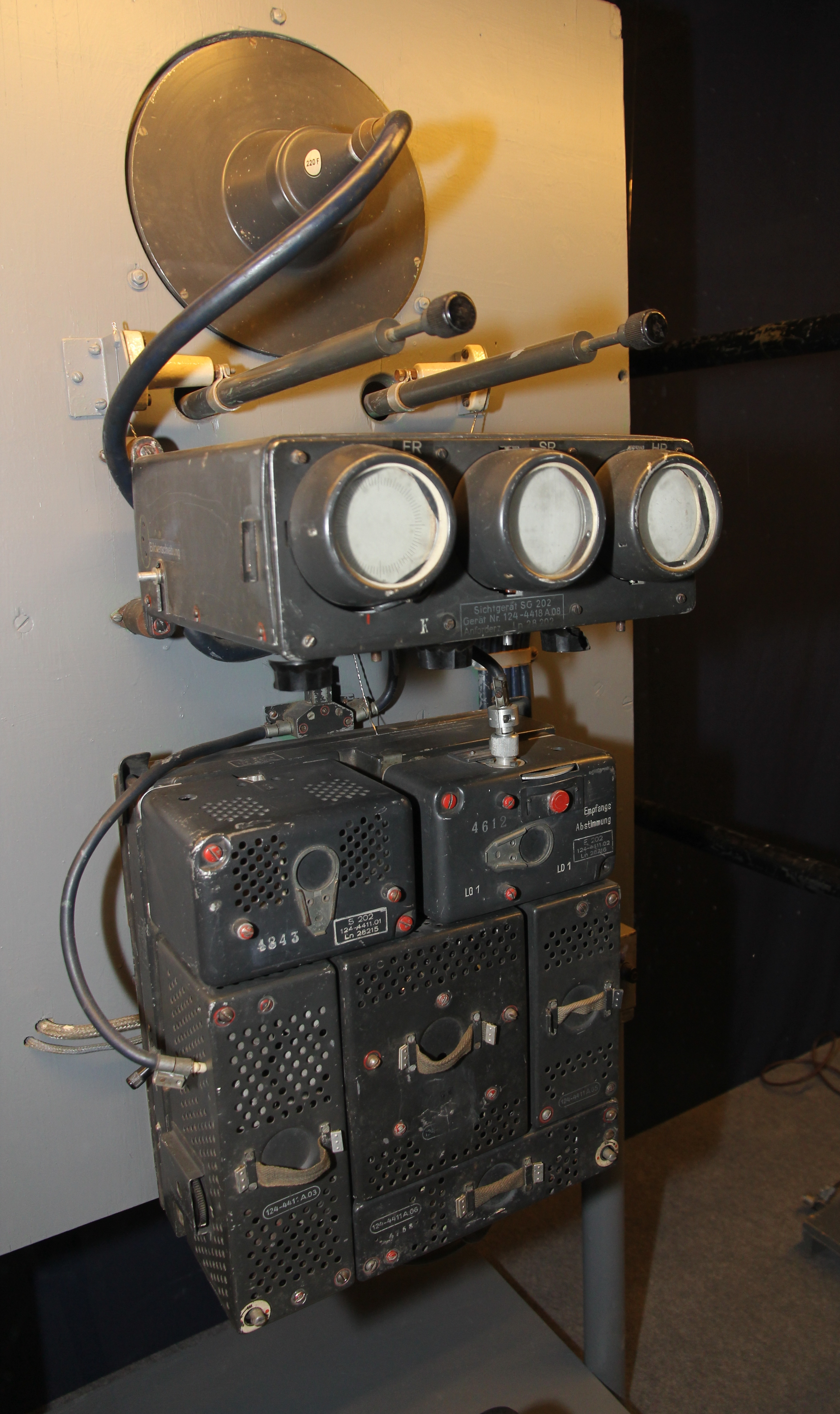
Lichtenstein cathode-ray tubes: • The left tube indicated other aircraft ahead as bumps. • The centre tube indicated range to a specific target and whether they were higher or lower. • The right tube indicated whether the target was to left or right.

On 1 November 1940, Becker was promoted to Oberleutnant (first lieutenant) of the Reserves and was awarded the Iron Cross 1st Class (Eisernes Kreuz 1. Klasse) on 23 December 1940. From December 1940 to April 1941, he was based at Leeuwarden airfield. He was then transferred to the Erprobungsstelle für Nachtjagdverfahren, the testing ground for night fighting tactics at Werneuchen on 5 April 1941. There, he was tasked with testing airborne radar and received the Front Flying Clasp of the Luftwaffe for Night Fighters in Silver (Frontflugspange für Nachtjäger in Silver) on 1 June. In July, he was transferred back to Leeuwarden, then serving in 4. Staffel of NJG 1 which was led by Oberleutnant Helmut Lent at the time. On the night of 8/9 August 1941, Becker and his radio operator (Bordfunker) Josef Staub, also became the first Luftwaffe night fighter crew to intercept an enemy bomber using airborne radar. Flying Dornier Do 215 B-5 "G9+OM" equipped with the FuG 202 Lichtenstein B/C radar, they tracked and claimed another Wellington bomber shot down. The aircraft shot down was Wellington T2625 GR-B which crashed near Bunde.

Becker claimed six victories between 10 August and 30 September 1941 in Do 215 B-5 "G9+OM" before the Lichtenstein radar became unserviceable in September. On 12 August 1941, he, Staub and Wilhelm Gänsler in the air gunner position, intercepted and shot down the Avro Manchester bomber L7381 EM-R from No. 207 Squadron. The Manchester was on a mission to Berlin and was the second airborne radar assisted aerial victory recorded. Becker developed his own tactics for attacking a bomber. He would trail the aircraft from the stern, just below the height shown on the radar. After sighting the bomber, he dived and accelerated to avoid being spotted by the tail gunner. Once underneath the enemy, Becker reduced the throttle and matched the speed of the unsuspecting pilot. Becker then climbed steadily to 50 metres (160 feet) from the target before he pulled up and opened fire. Because the Do 215 lost speed the bomber would fly ahead and the through the stream of shells. With this method, the gun sight was rarely needed. On 1 October, Becker received the Front Flying Clasp of the Luftwaffe for Night Fighters in Gold (Frontflugspange für Nachtjäger in Gold).

=== Squadron leader and missing in action ===
Becker was transferred to the II. Gruppe of Nachtjagdgeschwader 2 (NJG 2–2nd Night Fighter Wing) on 1 November 1941. He claimed his eighth aerial victory on 8 November and on 26 November was ordered to the Luftwaffe's main testing ground at Rechlin. On 1 December, Becker was appointed Staffelführer, a preliminary command position. On 20 January 1942, Becker claimed the destruction of Wellington bombers, all three in the vicinity of Terschelling. Wellington Z8370 from No. 12 Squadron was shot down at 21:00, Wellington Z1110 from No. 101 Squadron at 21:37, and Wellington Z1207 from No. 142 Squadron at 22:07. This achievement earned Becker a named references in the Wehrmachtbericht on 21 January, his first of four such mentions.

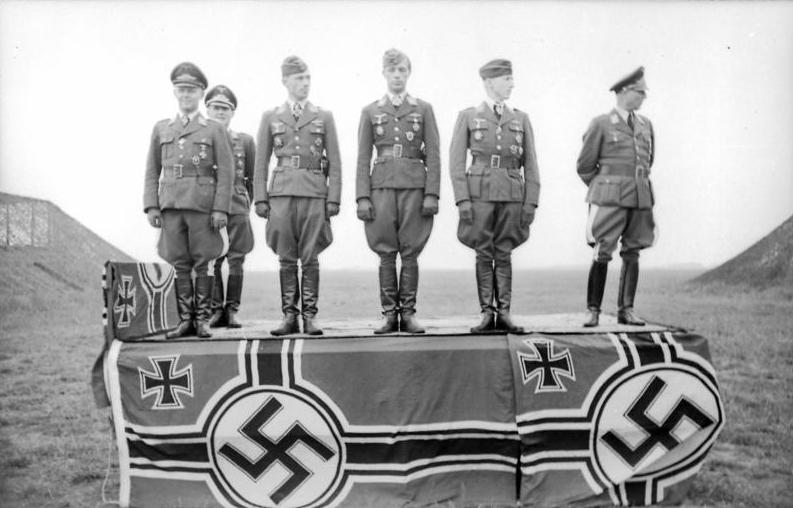
From left to right, Kammhuber, Lent, Gildner, Becker.

On 1 July 1942, after his 25th aerial victory, Becker was awarded the Knight's Cross of the Iron Cross (Ritterkreuz des Eisernen Kreuzes). Becker, who was still a member of the NSFK, was promoted to NSFK-Sturmführer on 15 September. On 1 October, he took command of 12./NJG 1 as Staffelkapitän (squadron leader). On the night of 9/10 November 1942, Becker and Staub claimed their 40th aerial victory. At the end of 1942, Becker was one of the leading night fighter pilots of the Luftwaffe, which at the time included Lent (49 nocturnal claims), Reinhold Knacke (40 nocturnal claims), Werner Streib (39 nocturnal claims) and Paul Gildner (37 nocturnal claims).

On 28 October, Gruppenkommandeur Hauptmann (Captain) Lent recommended Becker for promotion to Hauptmann. In his recommendation, Lent emphasized Becker's contribution in the development of night fighter equipment and tactics as well as his strong philosophical roots in National Socialism. The recommendation was seconded by Oberstleutnant (Lieutenant Colonel) Wilhelm von Friedberg, acting on behalf of the Geschwaderkommodore (wing commander), and finally approved by Generalleutnant (lit. lieutenant general, equivalent to major general) Kurt-Bertram von Döring, commander of the 1. Jagd-Division (1st Fighter Division). Becker was then transferred from the reserve force to active service and promoted to Hauptmann on 3 February 1943. His promotion was backdated to 1 February and the rank age was dated to 1 April 1942.

On 26 February 1943, Becker was informed that he had been awarded the Knight's Cross of the Iron Cross with Oak Leaves (Ritterkreuz des Eisernen Kreuzes mit Eichenlaub). He was the 198th member of the German armed forces to be so honored. After he received this information, he and his radio operator Oberfeldwebel Staub took off in Bf 110 G-4 (Werknummer 4864—factory number) on a daylight intercept mission over the North Sea against the United States Army Air Forces bombers attacking Wilhelmshaven. Following this mission, the two were reported as missing in action, last seen 10 kilometres (6.2 miles) north of Schiermonnikoog. Their exact fate was never determined. On 14 March 1949, Becker was declared dead as of 26 February 1943 by the Amtsgericht, an official court, in Dortmund-Hörde. Becker was succeeded by Leutnant Lothar Linke as commander of 12. Staffel.

== Summary of career ==
=== Aerial victory claims ===
Becker was credited with 44 aerial victories, claimed in about 160 combat missions. Spick lists him with 46 aerial victories. Foreman, Parry and Mathews, authors of Luftwaffe Night Fighter Claims 1939 – 1945, researched the German Federal Archives and found records for 41 nocturnal victory claims. Mathews and Foreman also published Luftwaffe Aces — Biographies and Victory Claims, listing Becker with 44 claims, plus one further unconfirmed claim.

Chronicle of aerial victories
This and the ? (question mark) indicates discrepancies between Luftwaffe Night Fighter Claims 1939 – 1945 and Luftwaffe Aces — Biographies and Victory Claims.
Claim	Date	Time	Type	Location	Serial No./Squadron No.
– 4. Staffel of Nachtjagdgeschwader 1 –
1	16 October 1940	21:25	Wellington	Osterwolde	Wellington L7844 KX-1 from No. 311 (Czechoslovak) Squadron
2	9 August 1941	00:25	Wellington	25 km (16 mi) east of Groningen	Wellington T2625 from No. 301 Polish Bomber Squadron
3	13 August 1941	01:25	Manchester	13 km (8.1 mi) east-southeast of Groningen	Manchester L7381 from No. 207 Squadron
4? (Note: This claim is not listed in Luftwaffe Aces — Biographies and Victory Claims.)	13 August 1941	01:25	Manchester	25 km (16 mi) east of Groningen	
5	15 August 1941	01:17	Whitley	25 km (16 mi) southeast of Leeuwarden	Whitley Z6842 from No. 102 Squadron
6	18 August 1941	01:44	Hampden	2 km (1.2 mi) south of Groningen	Hampden AE185 from No. 50 Squadron
7	6 September 1941	23:00	Whitley	east-northeast of Harderwijk	Whitley V Z6478 from No. 10 Squadron
8	29 September 1941	22:53	Wellington	35 km (22 mi) east-southeast of Groningen	Wellington X9910 KO-Y from No. 115 Squadron
– 6. Staffel of Nachtjagdgeschwader 2 –
9	8 November 1941	06:30	Whitley	13 km (8.1 mi) east of Stavoren	
10	20 January 1942	21:00	Wellington	near Terschelling	Wellington Z8370 PH-Y from No. 12 Squadron
11	20 January 1942	21:37	Wellington	north of Terschelling	Wellington Z1110 from No. 101 Squadron
12	20 January 1942	22:07	Wellington	northwest of Terschelling	Wellington Z1207 QT-U from No. 142 Squadron
13	9 March 1942	03:24	Manchester	east of Enkhuizen	
14	9 March 1942	04:11	Wellington	8 km (5.0 mi) north of Petten	
15	12 March 1942	23:04	Whitley	southeast of Ameland	
16	25 March 1942	22:28	Manchester	west of Makkum	Manchester L7390 from No. 106 Squadron
17	26 March 1942	00:33	Hampden	north of Vlieland	
18	28 March 1942	22:05	Stirling	north of Vlieland	
19	4 June 1942	00:27	Stirling	2 km (1.2 mi) north of De Kooy	Stirling W7474 HA-K from No. 218 (Gold Coast) Squadron
20	6 June 1942	01:21	Wellington	Slootdorp	
21	7 June 1942	00:44	Manchester	over sea, 30 km (19 mi) north of Ameland	
22	7 June 1942	01:10	Stirling	southwest of Holwerd	
23	7 June 1942	01:47	Wellington	east of Ameland	
24	9 June 1942	02:16	Wellington	west of Texel	
25	20 June 1942	03:00	Wellington	30 km (19 mi) northwest of Vlieland	
26	26 June 1942	00:39	Stirling	Wieringermeer	Stirling W7503 HA-A from No. 218 (Gold Coast) Squadron
27? (Note: This claim is not listed in Luftwaffe Night Fighter Claims 1939 – 1945.)	10 July 1942	—	Wellington	northeast of Vlieland	
28?	22 July 1942	02:30	Wellington	vicinity of Spierdijk	
29?	29 July 1942	00:48	Stirling	30 km (19 mi) north of Terschelling	
30?	29 July 1942	01:27	Stirling	30 km (19 mi) northwest of Terschelling	
31	18 August 1942	01:46	Stirling	30 km (19 mi) west of Terschelling	
32	18 August 1942	02:35	Wellington	5 km (3.1 mi) south of Harlingen	
33	28 August 1942	01:22	Wellington	6 km (3.7 mi) southeast of Medemblik	
34	28 August 1942	01:43	Stirling	west of Bergen aan Zee	Stirling R9160 HA-G from No. 218 (Gold Coast) Squadron
35	5 September 1942	04:15	Wellington	north of Ameland	
36	5 September 1942	04:45	Wellington	northwest of Ameland	
37	5 September 1942	05:09	Wellington	west of Schiermonnikoog	
38	14 September 1942	02:21	Halifax	10 km (6.2 mi) south of Leeuwarden	
– 12. Staffel of Nachtjagdgeschwader 1 –
39	13 October 1942	23:49	Stirling	35 km (22 mi) northwest of Texel	
40	14 October 1942	00:20	Wellington	30 km (19 mi) northwest of Vlieland	
41	9 November 1942	22:55	Wellington	5 km (3.1 mi) west of Dokkum	
42	8 January 1943	19:23	Lancaster	7 km (4.3 mi) southeast of Zutphen	
43	17 January 1943	23:03	Stirling	20 km (12 mi) north of Ameland	
44	17 January 1943	23:28	Stirling	40 km (25 mi) north of Terschelling	
45	31 January 1943	03:10	Lancaster	15 km (9.3 mi) east of Texel	

=== Awards ===
- Iron Cross (1939)
  - 2nd Class (3 July 1940)
  - 1st Class (23 December 1940)
- Front Flying Clasp of the Luftwaffe for night fighter pilots
  - in Silver (1 June 1941)
  - in Gold (1 October 1941)
- Honour Goblet of the Luftwaffe on 2 March 1942 as Oberleutnant and pilot
- German Cross in Gold on 24 April 1942 as Oberleutnant in the 6./Nachtjagdgeschwader 2 (Note: According to Obermaier on 4 May 1942.)
- Knight's Cross of the Iron Cross with Oak Leaves
  - Knight's Cross on 1 July 1942 as Oberleutnant and Staffelkapitän of the 12./Nachtjagdgeschwader 1 (Note: According to Scherzer as Oberleutnant of the Reserves and Staffelkapitän of the 6./Nachtjagdgeschwader 1.)
  - 198th Oak Leaves on 26 February 1943 as Hauptmann and Staffelkapitän of the 12./Nachtjagdgeschwader 1
- Mentioned in the Wehrmachtbericht on 21 January 1942, 26 March 1942, 7 June 1942 and on 26 June 1942

=== Dates of rank ===
Becker held various ranks in both the Luftwaffe and the NSFK.

Date	Luftwaffe	NSFK
1 June 1937:	Feldwebel of the Reserves	—
1 February 1938:	Leutnant of the Reserves	—
1 November 1940:	Oberleutnant of the Reserves	—
15 September 1942:	—	NSFK-Sturmführer
3 February 1943:	Hauptmann, effective as of 1 February 1943 with a rank age of 1 April 1942	—
