= Helmut Lent =

German fighter ace (1918–1944)

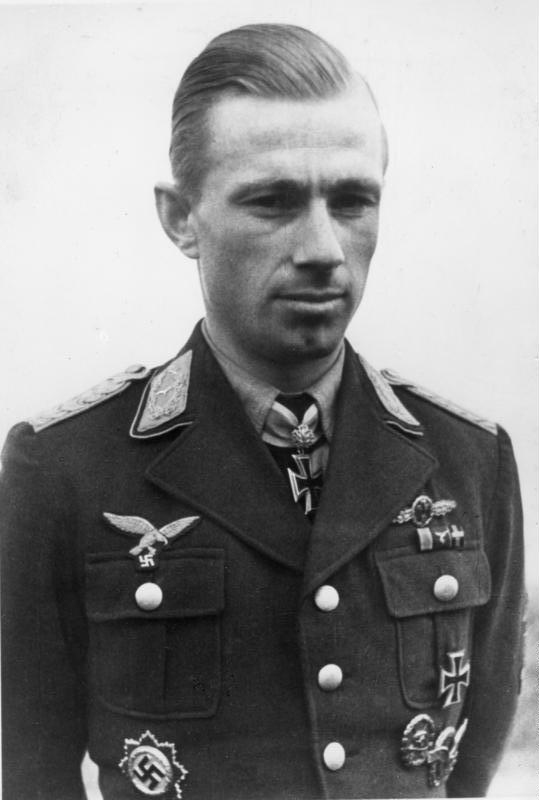
- Major Lent in 1943
- Born: Helmut Johannes Siegfried Lent; 13 June 1918; Pyrehne, Kreis Landsberg/Warthe, Province of Brandenburg, Kingdom of Prussia, German Empire
- Died: 7 October 1944 (aged 26); Paderborn, German Reich
- Burial place: Military cemetery at Stade
- Relatives: ∞ 1941 Helene "Lena" Senokosnikow
- Military career
- Allegiance: Nazi Germany
- Branch: Luftwaffe
- Service years: 1936–1944
- Rank: Oberst (posthumous)
- Units: ZG 76, NJG 1, NJG 2, NJG 3
- Commands: IV./NJG 1, II./NJG 2, NJG 3
- Conflicts: See battles World War II: Invasion of Poland; Battle of the Heligoland Bight (1939); Battle of Denmark; Norwegian Campaign; Defence of the Reich (DOW)
- Awards: Knight's Cross of the Iron Cross with Oak Leaves, Swords and Diamonds

Helmut Johannes Siegfried Lent (German pronunciation: [ˈhɛlmuːt ˈlɛnt]; 13 June 1918 – 7 October 1944) was a German night-fighter ace in World War II. Lent shot down 110 aircraft, 102 of them at night. (Note: For a list of Luftwaffe night fighter aces see List of German World War II night fighter aces) Born into a devoutly religious family, he showed an early passion for glider flying; against his father's wishes, he joined the Luftwaffe in 1936. After completing his training, he was assigned to the 1. Squadron, or Staffel, of Zerstörergeschwader 76 (ZG 76), a wing flying the Messerschmitt Bf 110 twin-engine heavy fighter. Lent claimed his first aerial victories at the outset of World War II in the invasion of Poland and over the North Sea. During the invasion of Norway he flew ground support missions before he was transferred to the newly established Nachtjagdgeschwader 1 (NJG 1), a night-fighter wing. (Note: See Organization of the Luftwaffe during World War II for an explanation of the Luftwaffe structure.)

Lent claimed his first nocturnal victory on 12 May 1941 and on 30 August 1941 was awarded the Knight's Cross of the Iron Cross for 22 victories. His steady accumulation of aerial victories resulted in regular promotions and awards. On the night of 15 June 1944, Major Lent was the first night fighter pilot to claim 100 nocturnal aerial victories, a feat which earned him the Knight's Cross of the Iron Cross with Oak Leaves, Swords and Diamonds on 31 July 1944.

On 5 October 1944, Lent flew a Junkers Ju 88 on a routine transit flight from Stade to Nordborchen, 5 kilometres (3 mi) south of Paderborn. On the landing approach one of the engines cut out and the aircraft collided with power lines. All four members of the crew were fatally wounded. Three men died shortly after the crash and Lent succumbed to his injuries two days later on 7 October 1944.

== Childhood, education and early career ==
Lent was born on 13 June 1918 in Pyrehne, district of Landsberg an der Warthe, then in the Province of Brandenburg within the German Empire, now Pyrzany, Lubusz Province, western Poland, and christened Helmut Johannes Siegfried Lent. He was the fifth child of Johannes Lent, a Lutheran minister and Marie Elisabeth, née Braune. Helmut Lent had two older brothers, Werner and Joachim, and two older sisters, Käthe and Ursula. His family was deeply religious; in addition to his father, both of his brothers and both grandfathers were also Lutheran ministers.

From Easter 1924 until Easter 1928, Lent attended the local public primary school at Pyrehne. His father and oldest brother Werner then tutored him at home in preparation for the entrance examination at the public secondary school at Landsberg. (Note: After 1933 the school was renamed Hermann Göring Hochschule.) In February 1933, Helmut joined the Jungvolk, the junior branch of the Hitler Youth. From March 1933, he acted as a youth platoon leader, or Jungzugführer (1 March 1933 – 1 April 1935) and flag-bearer, or Fähnleinführer (1 April 1935 – 9 November 1935) until he left the Jungvolk to prepare for his diploma examination. Helmut passed his graduation examinations at the age of seventeen on 12 December 1935. On 2 February 1936, he began the eight-week compulsory National Labor Service (Reichsarbeitsdienst) at Mohrin. He joined the military service in the Luftwaffe as a Fahnenjunker on 1 April 1936, against the wishes of his father.

His military training began on 6 April 1936 at the 2nd Air Warfare School (Luftkriegsschule 2) at Gatow, on the south-western outskirts of Berlin. He swore the National Socialist oath of allegiance on 21 April 1936. Flight training began on Monday, 7 August 1936 at Gatow. His first flight was in a Heinkel He 72 Kadet D-EYZA single engine biplane. Lent logged his first solo flight on 15 September 1936 in a Focke-Wulf Fw 44 Stieglitz. By this time, Lent had accumulated 63 flights in his logbook. In conjunction with flight training, the students also learned to drive motorcycles and cars and during one of these training exercises, Lent was involved in a road accident, breaking his upper leg badly enough to prevent him from flying for five months. This did not adversely affect his classroom training and on 1 April 1937, after taking his commission examination, he was promoted to Fähnrich. On 19 October 1937 Lent completed his flight training and was awarded the A/B License. He earned his wings on 15 November 1937. On 1 February 1938, he was promoted to Oberfähnrich (first ensign), and on 1 March 1938 to Leutnant. By this time, he had made 434 flights in eight different types of aircraft and had accumulated 112 hours and 48 minutes flying time, mostly in daylight flights, in single engine training aircraft.

After leaving Gatow, Helmut Lent was posted to the Heavy Bomber Crew School, or Große Kampffliegerschule at Tutow, in northeast Germany. He spent three months training as an observer (1 March 1938 – 30 May 1938). Prior to completing this course, Lent was run over by a car, resulting in a broken lower jaw, concussion, and internal bleeding. On 1 July 1938, Lent was posted to the 3rd Group of Jagdgeschwader 132 "Richthofen" (III./JG 132), flying on 19 July 1938 for the first time after his injuries.

At the beginning of September, Lent's squadron, 7./JG 132, relocated to Großenhain near Dresden, in preparation and support of the annexation of Czechoslovakia. Lent flew a number of operational patrols in this conflict until his Staffel relocated again to Rangsdorf on 29 September 1938. After the tension over the occupation of the Sudeten territories eased, Lent's unit began a conversion to the Messerschmitt Bf 108 Taifun. On 1 November 1938 III./JG 132 moved to Fürstenwalde, between Berlin and Frankfurt an der Oder, and was renamed II./JG 141, and Lent was posted to the 6th Squadron.

II./JG 141 changed its designation to I./Zerstörergeschwader 76 (I./ZG 76) on 1 May 1939 at the same time relocating to an airfield at Olomouc, Czechoslovakia. The group was being re-equipped with the Messerschmitt Bf 110, and Lent made his first flight in the Bf 110 on 7 June 1939. Lent was granted his Luftwaffe Advanced Pilot's Certificate (Erweiterter Luftwaffen-Flugzeugführerschein), also known as 'C'-Certificate, confirming proficiency on multi-engine aircraft, on 12 May 1939. While converting to the Bf 110, Lent did not have a regular wireless operator (Funker) in the rear gunner's seat, but on 14 August 1939 he was accompanied in M8+AH for the first time by Gefreiter Walter Kubisch. During the prelude of World War II on 25 August 1939 I./ZG 76 deployed to an airfield at Ohlau to the southeast of Breslau.

== World War II ==
World War II began at 04:45 on Friday 1 September 1939 when German forces crossed the Polish border. Helmut Lent, flying a Bf 110 marked M8-DH, took off from Ohlau, at 04:44 to escort Heinkel He 111 bombers on a mission over Kraków.

=== Invasion of Poland ===
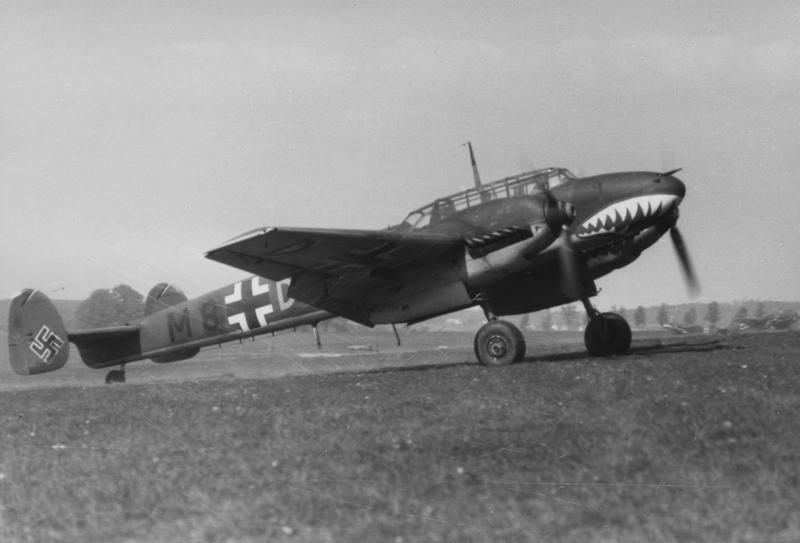
A ZG 76 Bf 110C similar to those flown by Helmut Lent

The German plans for the invasion of Poland were conceived under the codename Fall Weiss (Case White). This operation called for simultaneous attacks on Poland from three directions, the north, the west and the south, beginning at 04:45 on the early morning of 1 September 1939. On this morning Helmut Lent, with Kubisch as his wireless operator and rear gunner, escorted a formation of Heinkel 111 bombers of I. and III./Kampfgeschwader 4 (KG 4) attacking the airfields at Kraków in support of the southern prong of the German attack. At 16:30 on 2 September 1939, the second day of the German attack, Lent took off in the direction of Łódź and claimed his first aerial-victory of the war, shooting down a PZL P.11.

At this point of the campaign the Bf 110s switched from bomber escort to ground-attack since the Polish Air Force was all but defeated. In this capacity Lent and Kubisch destroyed a twin-engined monoplane on the ground on 5 September and another aircraft, a PZL P.24, on 9 September. On 12 September 1939 he was attacked by a Polish aircraft which shot out his starboard engine. Lent made a forced landing behind German lines. He flew five more missions during the Polish campaign, destroying one anti-aircraft battery. For his actions in the Polish campaign Lent was awarded one of the first Iron Cross 2nd Class (Eisernes Kreuz zweiter Klasse) of World War II on 21 September 1939. I./ZG 76 relocated to the Stuttgart area on 29 September 1939 to defend the western border against the French and British, who had been at war with Germany since 3 September 1939. From early October to middle December I./ZG 76 operated from a number of airfields in the Stuttgart and Ruhr areas before relocating north to Jever on 16 December 1939.

=== Battle of the Heligoland Bight ===
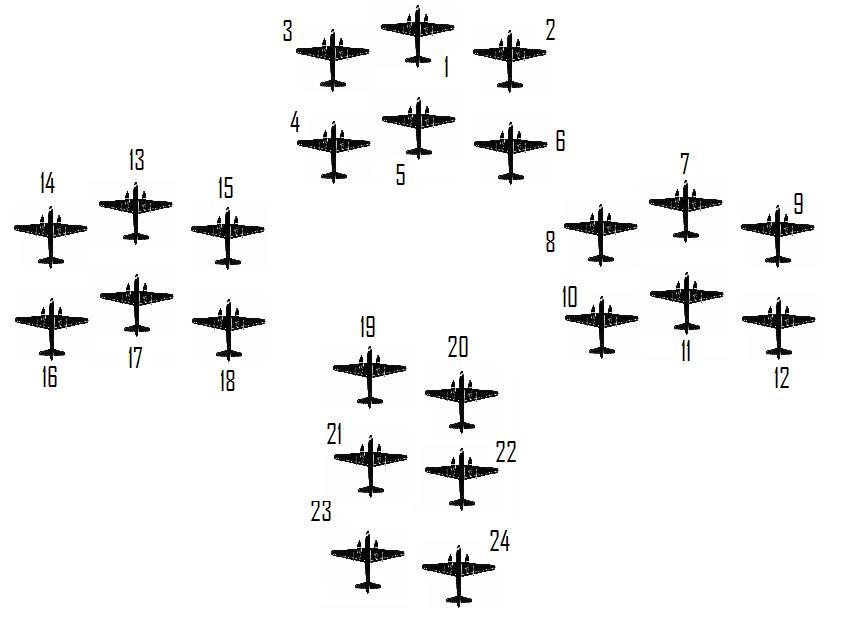
Formation 1 Section 1: 1 Richard Kellett 2 Turner 3 Speirs Section 2: 4 Kelly 5 Duguid 6 Riddlesworth Formation 2 Section 1: 7 Harris 8 Briden 9 Bolloch Section 2: 10 Ramshaw 11 Grant 12 Purdy Formation 3 Section 1: 13 Guthrie 14 Petts 15 McRae Section 2: 16 Challes 17 Allison 18 Lines Formation 4 19 Hue-Williams 20 Lemon 21 Wimberley 22 Lewis 23 Thompson 24 Ruse

During the first month of the war the Royal Air Force (RAF) mostly focused its bomber attacks against anti-shipping operations on the German Bight. RAF bombers mounted a heavy attack against shipping off Wilhelmshaven on 18 December 1939 in what became known as the Battle of the Heligoland Bight. Twenty-four twin-engine Vickers Wellington from No. 9 Squadron, No. 37 Squadron and No. 149 Squadron formed up over Norfolk heading for the island of Heligoland. Two aircraft aborted the mission due to mechanical defects, but the remaining 22 pursued the attack and were spotted by a Freya radar on the East Frisian Islands.

Helmut Lent was ordered to intercept and engage the attacking bomber force and after refuelling—Lent had just landed at Jever from an armed patrol—claimed three Wellingtons, two of which, shot down at 14:30 and 14:45, were later confirmed. The two aircraft were both from No. 37 Squadron, captained by Flying Officer P.A. Wimberley and Flying Officer O.J.T. Lewis respectively, and both crashed in the shallow sea off Borkum. It is likely that his third claim may have been No. 37 Squadron Wellington 1A N2396, LF-J, piloted by Sergeant H. Ruse, which crash-landed on the sand dunes of Borkum. Lent was refused the victory over Wimberley, as the Wellington was attacked by Lent after it had already been badly damaged and was about to crash. The Wellington was credited to pilot Carl-August Schumacher.

His success as a fighter pilot over the North Sea had made him a minor national hero. Exploits such as those at Heligoland made good news stories for German propaganda machine. Consequently, he attracted fan mail—mainly from young girls and women—among them Elisabeth Petersen. Lent replied to her letter, and he and Elisabeth met on a blind date at the Reichshof hotel in Hamburg, after which they enjoyed a skiing holiday in Hirschegg in February 1940.

=== Norwegian Campaign and Battle of Britain ===
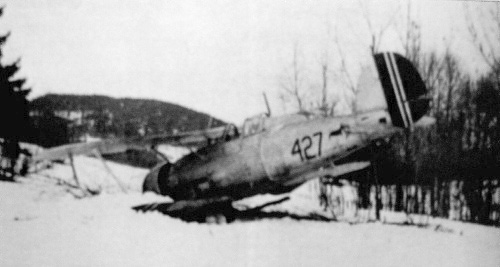
Norwegian Gladiator 427 brought down by Lent on 9 April 1940

On 8 April 1940 eight aircraft of 1./ZG 76, under the command of Staffelkapitän Werner Hansen, deployed northward from Jever to Westerland on Sylt in preparation for operation Weserübung, the invasion of Norway. The German plan for the attack called for an amphibious assault on the Norwegian capital, Oslo, and six major ports from Kristiansand in the south to Narvik in the north. Simultaneously, Junkers 52 (Ju 52) transport aircraft would drop parachute troops to secure Oslo's Fornebu airport. Additional Ju 52s were scheduled to arrive at Fornebu twenty minutes after the parachute drop, by which time the airfield had to be in German hands. 1./ZG 76 was to provide air cover and ground-attack support for both waves. Eight Bf 110 Zerstörer of 1./ZG 76 took off at 7:00 in the morning, planning to synchronise their arrival at Fornebu with the parachute drop at 8:45. The distance from Westerland to Fornebu meant that this was a one-way operation; the Bf 110s could not hold enough fuel for the return trip. Their fuel was calculated to provide them 20 minutes flying time over Fornebu, and the pilots would have to land at Fornebu once the airfield had been seized.

On the early morning flight to Fornebu, Lent engaged and shot down a Norwegian Gloster Gladiator. While the Ju 52s transporting the German paratroops came under heavy fire, Lent's Rotte engaged the enemy ground positions. Lent's starboard engine caught fire, forcing him to land immediately. With Kubisch manning the movable machine gun, Lent negotiated the capitulation with the Norwegian ground forces and the airfield was in German hands.

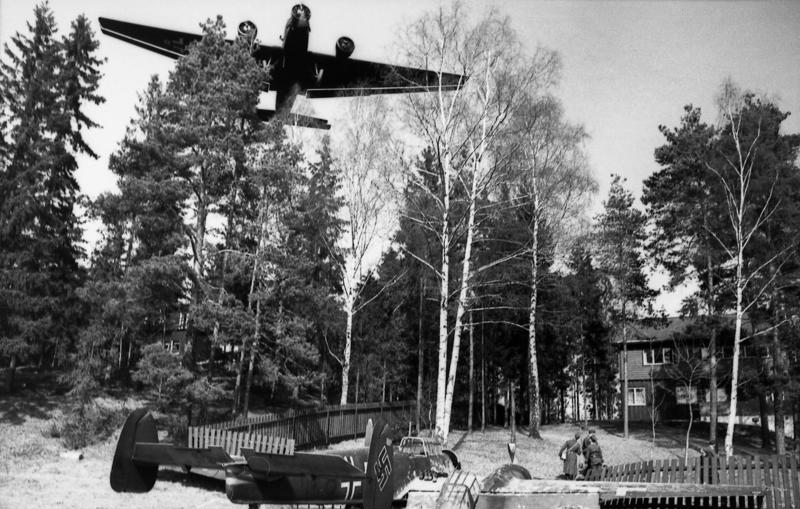
Lent's Bf 110C ran out of fuel and was forced to land at Oslo/Fornebu airfield on 9 April 1940. A troop-carrying Ju 52 flies over Lent's belly-landed Bf 110.

At 18:50 the same day, Lent and his Staffelkapitän Werner Hansen took off again from Fornebu in undamaged Bf 110s. During the 40-minute flight, they came across a RAF Short Sunderland flying boat, serial number L2167, from No. 210 Squadron RAF which they shot down together; Hansen received credit for the "kill". Helmut Lent was awarded the Iron Cross 1st Class (Eisernes Kreuz erster Klasse) on 13 May 1940 before he was transferred to Trondheim on 18 May. He claimed his second aerial victory of the Norwegian campaign on 27 May over a RAF Gloster Gladiator from No. 263 Squadron RAF, piloted by Flight Lieutenant Caesar Hull. On 2 June 1940 Lent and his wingman Thönes claimed a Gladiator each. The flight lasted 5 hours and 46 minutes and their opponents were again from No. 263 Squadron, aircraft serial number N5893 piloted by Pilot Officer J.L. Wilkie, and N5681 piloted by Pilot Officer L.R. Jacobsen. He claimed his seventh victory overall and final of the Norwegian theatre of operations on 15 June 1940 over a No. 254 Squadron RAF Bristol Blenheim, piloted by Pilot Officer P.C. Gaylord. On 1 July 1940 Lent was promoted to Oberleutnant and on 13 July 1./ZG 76 was relocated to Stavanger/Forus.

Helmut Lent briefly participated in the Battle of Britain when on 15 August 1940 twenty-one Bf 110s from I./ZG 76 escorted He 111 bombers from Kampfgeschwader 26 (KG 26) on their attack on Yorkshire and the Newcastle/Sunderland area. I./ZG 76 lost seven aircraft on this mission and it was Helmut Lent's 98th and final mission as a Zerstörer pilot.

=== Night fighter career ===
By June 1940 RAF Bomber Command penetrations of German airspace had increased to the level at which Hermann Göring decreed that a night-fighter force should be formed. The officer tasked with its creation was Wolfgang Falck, Gruppenkommandeur of the I./Zerstörergeschwader 1 (ZG 1). The night-fighter force began to expand rapidly, with existing units being divided to form the nucleus of new units. By October 1940 Nachtjagdgeschwader 1 (NJG 1) comprised three Gruppen, while Nachtjagdgeschwader 2 (NJG 2) and Nachtjagdgeschwader 3 (NJG 3), were still forming. It was during this period that Helmut Lent reluctantly became a member of the night-fighter force. At the end of August Lent wrote home, "We are currently converting to night fighting. We are not very enthusiastic. We would sooner head directly for England."

Lent completed night fighter training at Ingolstadt in south-western Germany, and was appointed squadron leader, or Staffelkapitän, of the newly formed 6./NJG 1 on 1 October 1940. The squadron was based at Deelen Airfield, located 12.5 kilometres (8 mi) north of Arnhem in the Netherlands. On the night 11–12 May 1941, Lent claimed his first nocturnal aerial victories against two Wellington IC bombers from No. 40 Squadron RAF on a mission against Hamburg. BL-H (serial number R1330) was shot down at 01:40 near Süderstapel and BL-Z (R1461) at 02:49 near Nordstrand.

On 1 July 1941, he took command of 4./NJG 1, stationed in the Netherlands at Fliegerhorst (airfield) Leeuwarden, 161 kilometres (100 mi) north of Arnheim, on the Friesland coast. From this position in the so-called German Bight, the squadron patrolled the North Sea coast, and could intercept Allied night-time bombing missions, what Nazi propaganda called terror attacks, which were conducted from England. By the end of the war, the 4./NJG 1 was one of the most successful Nachtjagdstaffeln—a squadron of a night fighter wing—of the Luftwaffe. Other members included such night fighter pilots as Oberleutnant Helmut Woltersdorf, Leutnant Ludwig Becker (44 victories, KIA February 1943), Leutnant Egmont Prinz zur Lippe-Weißenfeld (51 victories, killed in a flying accident in the Netherlands in March 1944), Leutnant Leopold Fellerer (41 victories), Oberfeldwebel Paul Gildner (46 victories, killed in a flying accident at Fliegerhorst Gilze-Rijen in the Netherlands in February 1943), and Unteroffizier Siegfried Ney (12 victories, KIA February 1943). On 30 August 1941, Lent received the Knight's Cross of the Iron Cross (Ritterkreuz des Eisernen Kreuzes) for seven daytime and 14 night victories.

On 1 November 1941, Lent became acting Group Commander Gruppenkommandeur of the newly formed II./NJG 2. On 1 October 1942, II./NJG 2 was renamed and became IV./NJG 1. Lent's first aerial victory as a Gruppenkommandeur, his 20th night-time, and his last in 1941, came during the night of Friday 7 November to Saturday 8 November. He shot down a Wellington 1C heading for Berlin, which came down near Akkrum. The six-man crew of the bomber, X9976 of No. 75 (New Zealand) Squadron, was killed in action. This achievement earned Lent a reference in the Wehrmachtbericht (his first of six in total), an information bulletin issued by the headquarters of the Wehrmacht. To be singled out individually in the Wehrmachtbericht was an honour and was entered in the Orders and Decorations' section of one's Service Record Book.

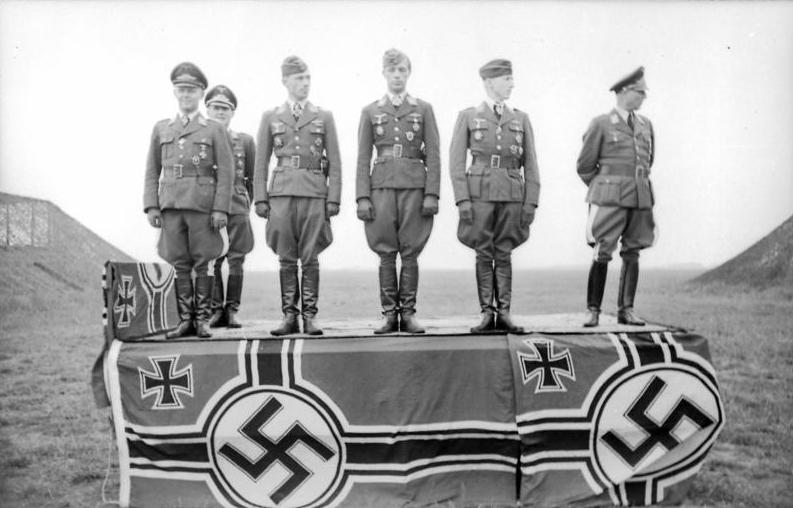
Lent (third from right) in a Nazi propaganda photograph, summer 1942, France

Lent was promoted to Hauptmann on 1 January 1942. Later that year, he was awarded the Knight's Cross of the Iron Cross with Oak Leaves (Ritterkreuz des Eisernen Kreuzes mit Eichenlaub) on 6 June 1942, at which time his total stood at 34 nocturnal victories plus seven day-time victories. The award was presented at the Führerhauptquartier on 28 and 29 June, his tally standing then at 39 nocturnal and seven day-time victories. Lent also held the distinction of achieving the first Lichtenstein radar-assisted air victory in a Dornier Do 215B-5 night fighter. Lent flew Dornier Do 215B-5 code R4+DC regularly on Himmelbett missions because of its five-hour endurance. Lent claimed at least four victories in this machine.

By the end of 1942, Lent had 56 victories and was the top German night-fighter ace. He was promoted to Major on 1 January 1943 and appointed Geschwaderkommodore of NJG 3 on 1 August 1943 at Geschwader Headquarters at Stade, west of Hamburg. After 73 kills, of which 65 were claimed at night, he was awarded the Knight's Cross of the Iron Cross with Oak Leaves and Swords (Ritterkreuz des Eisernen Kreuzes mit Eichenlaub und Schwertern) on 2 August 1943 and notified by telegram on 4 August. The Swords were presented to him at the Führerhauptquartier at Rastenburg on 10/11 August 1943.

In January 1944, Lent downed three so-called "heavies"—four-engined strategic bombers—in one night, but his aircraft was damaged by return fire, requiring a forced landing. He used only 22 cannon shells to down two bombers on the night of the 22–23 March 1944, and fired only 57 rounds in seven minutes against three Avro Lancasters on 15–16 June. Promoted to Oberstleutnant, he was awarded the Knight's Cross of the Iron Cross with Oak Leaves, Swords and Diamonds (Ritterkreuz des Eisernen Kreuzes mit Eichenlaub, Schwertern und Brillanten) in recognition of his 110 confirmed air kills, the first of two night-fighter pilots to be awarded the decoration. The second was Heinz-Wolfgang Schnaufer, who, with 121 aerial victories, became aviation history's leading night-fighter pilot.

=== Personal life ===
All German officers were required to obtain official permission to marry; however, this was usually a bureaucratic formality. When Lent decided to marry Elizabeth Petersen, his admirer from Hamburg whom he had met on a blind date, his case was more complicated. 'Elisabeth Petersen' was in fact Helene (Lena) Senokosnikow, who had been born in Moscow in April 1914. She had been afraid to reveal her true identity, since Russians were not popular in the Third Reich, but after a thorough investigation into her background and racial ancestry, she received her German citizenship on 15 March 1941. They were married on 10 September 1941 in Wellingsbüttel, Hamburg. The marriage produced two daughters. Christina was born on 6 June 1942; the second, Helma, was born on 6 October 1944, shortly after her father's fatal crash.

Both of Helmut's older brothers, Joachim and Werner, as members of the Confessing Church (German: Bekennende Kirche), encountered trouble with the Nazi Party. The Confessing Church was a movement within German Protestantism during Nazi Germany that arose in opposition to government-sponsored efforts to unify all Protestant churches into a single pro-Nazi German Evangelical Church. Werner Lent, an adherent of the Confessing church, was arrested for the first time in 1937 after preaching an anti-Nazi sermon. In June 1942, his brother Joachim was arrested by the Gestapo after reading the so-called Mölders letter from the pulpit. The Mölders letter was a propaganda piece conceived by Sefton Delmer, the chief of the British black propaganda in the Political Warfare Executive (PWE) to capitalise on the death of Germany's fighter ace Werner Mölders; this letter, ostensibly written by Mölders, attested to the supreme importance of his Catholic faith in his life—by implication, placing faith above his allegiance to the National Socialist Party.

=== Death ===
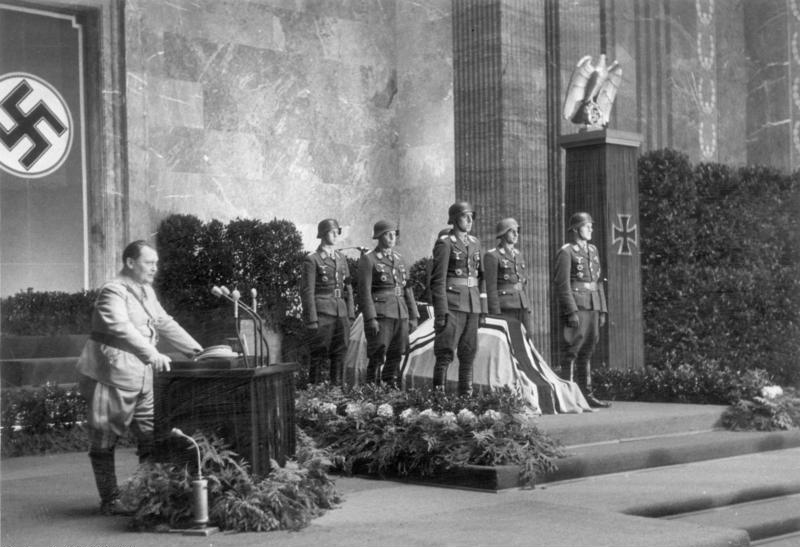
Hermann Göring speaking at Lent's funeral

On 5 October 1944, Lent flew his Junkers Ju 88 G–6, coded D5+AA, from Stade to Paderborn. His crew included his long-time radio operator Oberfeldwebel Walter Kubisch, the member of a Propagandakompanie (Wehrmacht Propaganda Troops) Leutnant Werner Kark in the aerial gunner position, and Oberleutnant Hermann Klöss, second radio operator. Lent was on his way to visit the Geschwaderkommodore of the NJG 1, Oberstleutnant Hans-Joachim Jabs, to discuss operational matters. Shortly before the arrival at Paderborn/Nordborchen, the airfield had come under attack by the United States Army Air Forces, leaving craters on the runway. An emergency makeshift runway was cleared and marked out for Lent, but an overhead electrical cable was overlooked. During the landing approach, the left engine of the plane failed, causing the wing to dip. Lent was unable to keep the plane steady and it struck high-voltage cables and crashed. All four members of the crew sustained serious injuries but were rescued alive. Kubisch and Klöss succumbed to their injuries on the same day, Kark on the next morning and Lent himself died two days later on 7 October 1944.

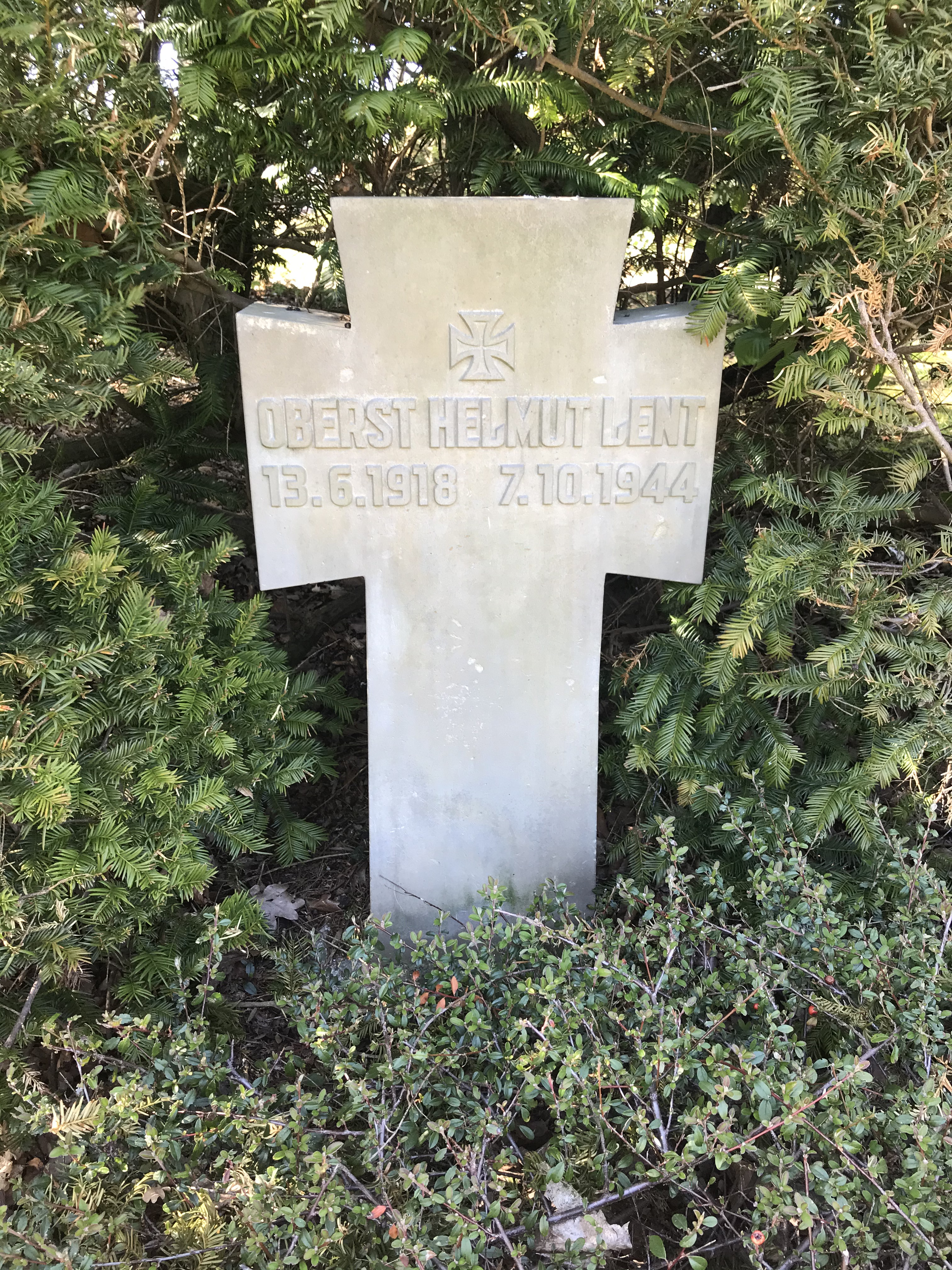
Lent's grave at the Garrison Cemetery (Garnisonsfriedhof) in Stade

Lent's state funeral was held in the Reich Chancellery, Berlin, on Wednesday 11 October 1944. Reichsmarschall Hermann Göring took the salute at Lent's coffin, which was draped in the national flag of the Nazi Germany. Ahead of the coffin, carrying Lent's honours and decorations on a velvet cushion, marched Oberstleutnant Werner Streib, the Inspector of Night Fighters. Six steel-helmeted officers, all recipients of the Knight's Cross of the Iron Cross, escorted the coffin on its caisson and stood as guard of honour during the ceremony: Oberstleutnant Günther Radusch, Oberstleutnant Hans-Joachim Jabs, Major Rudolf Schoenert, Hauptmann Heinz Strüning, Hauptmann Karl Hadeball and Hauptmann Paul Zorner. On 12 October 1944 Lent and his crew were interred in a single grave in the military cemetery at Stade.

== Commemoration ==
A number of Helmut Lent's awards were auctioned at Sotheby's, London, on 18 July 1966. The items were bought in one lot by an anonymous bidder for the total sum of £500. The purchaser was Adolf Galland, the former General der Jagdflieger, acting on behalf of the West German Ministry of Defence. The awards were sold by Helmut Lent's elder daughter Christina after consultation with her mother, Lena, who was in urgent need for money to pay for an operation. The Federal Ministry of Defence presented the collection to the Wehrgeschichtliches Museum Rastatt, Germany.

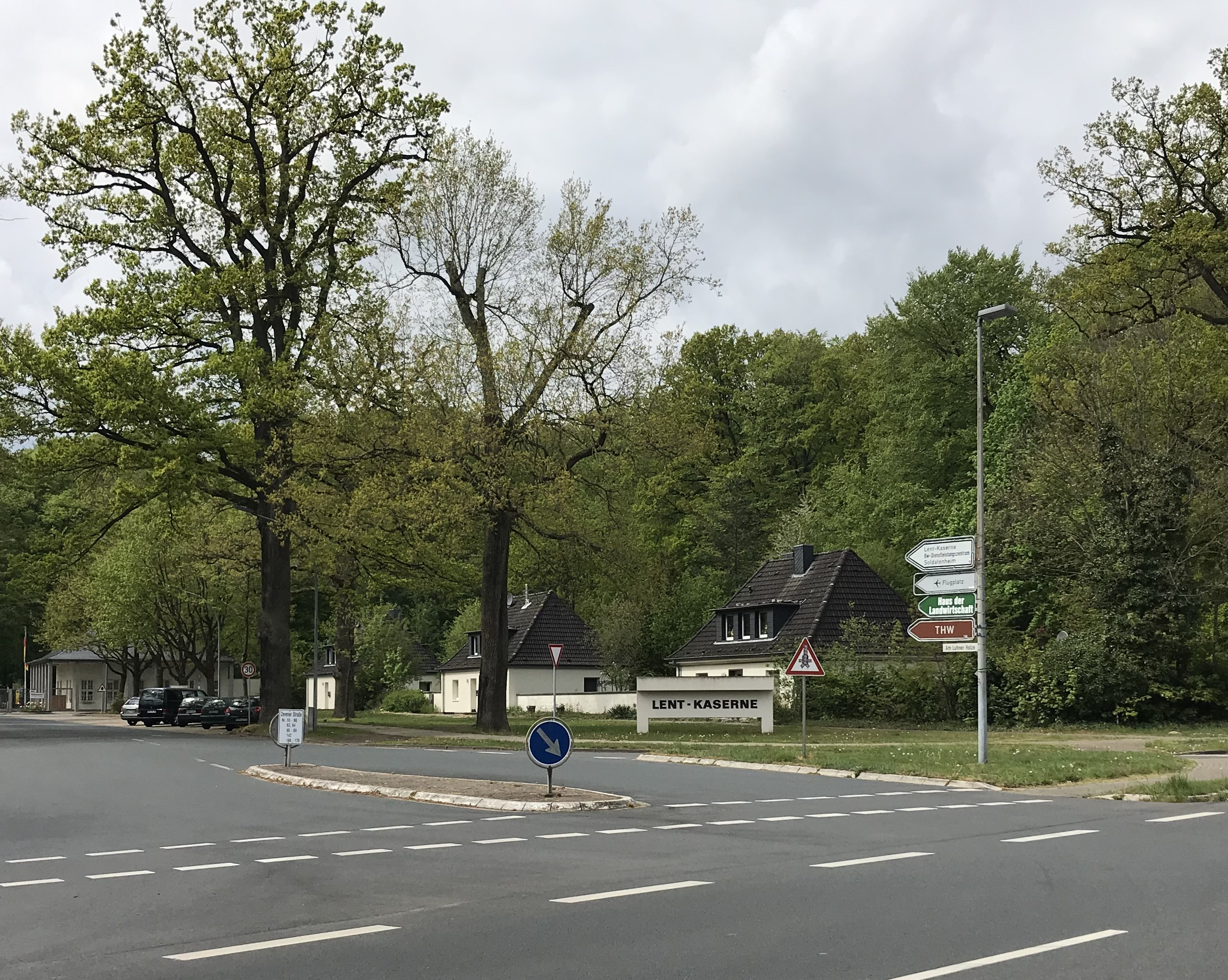
The former Lent Barracks in Rotenburg (Wümme)

In 1964, West German Army Aviation Corps installation in Rotenburg (Wümme), Lower Saxony was named the Lent Barracks, or Lent-Kaserne, on a recommendation of Lent's former superior. In 2014, the Bundeswehr decided to rename the facility as Lent was no longer considered to be an appropriate namesake. The process, which is expected to finalise in end 2015, involves 1,500 soldiers and 250 civil employees of the site and was initiated by the commander Oberstleutnant Edmund Vogel in early 2015. In September 2016 the district administrator Herrmann Luttmann, member of the moderate right-wing Party CDU stated "No substantial evidence has been found that indeed Helmut Lent was a supporter of the Nazi regime". Luttmann will therefore recommend to keep the name to the local government. Lars Klingbeil, member of the Bundestag and of the Defence Committee has signalled that the German armed forced would adhere to the decision made on local level despite all controversies.

"It's long overdue to rename the last barracks named after Wehrmacht officers," Professor Johannes Tuchel, head of the German Resistance Memorial, told Bild am Sonntag. "Officers like Schulz, Lent and Marseille fought in Hitler's war and were part of Nazi propaganda." The barracks should be renamed after soldiers who resisted the Nazi regime, he said. "Those who fought for human rights and the rule of law cannot be commemorated enough." Historian Wolfram Wette concurs with this opinion, citing the tradition directive of 1982. Historian Sönke Neitzel has the opinion that the Bundeswehr should keep the name of Lent, who was not a Nazi but only a value-oriented person who followed his Christian image of humankind (christlichen Menschenbild), even if no Wehrmacht soldier came out of the war completely clean. Despite this, Neitzel thinks that except for the case of Erwin Rommel, in five years no Bundeswehr barracks will retain the name of a Wehrmacht man any more, since soldiers do not want to risk their careers to defend names unwanted by the Ministry of Defence.

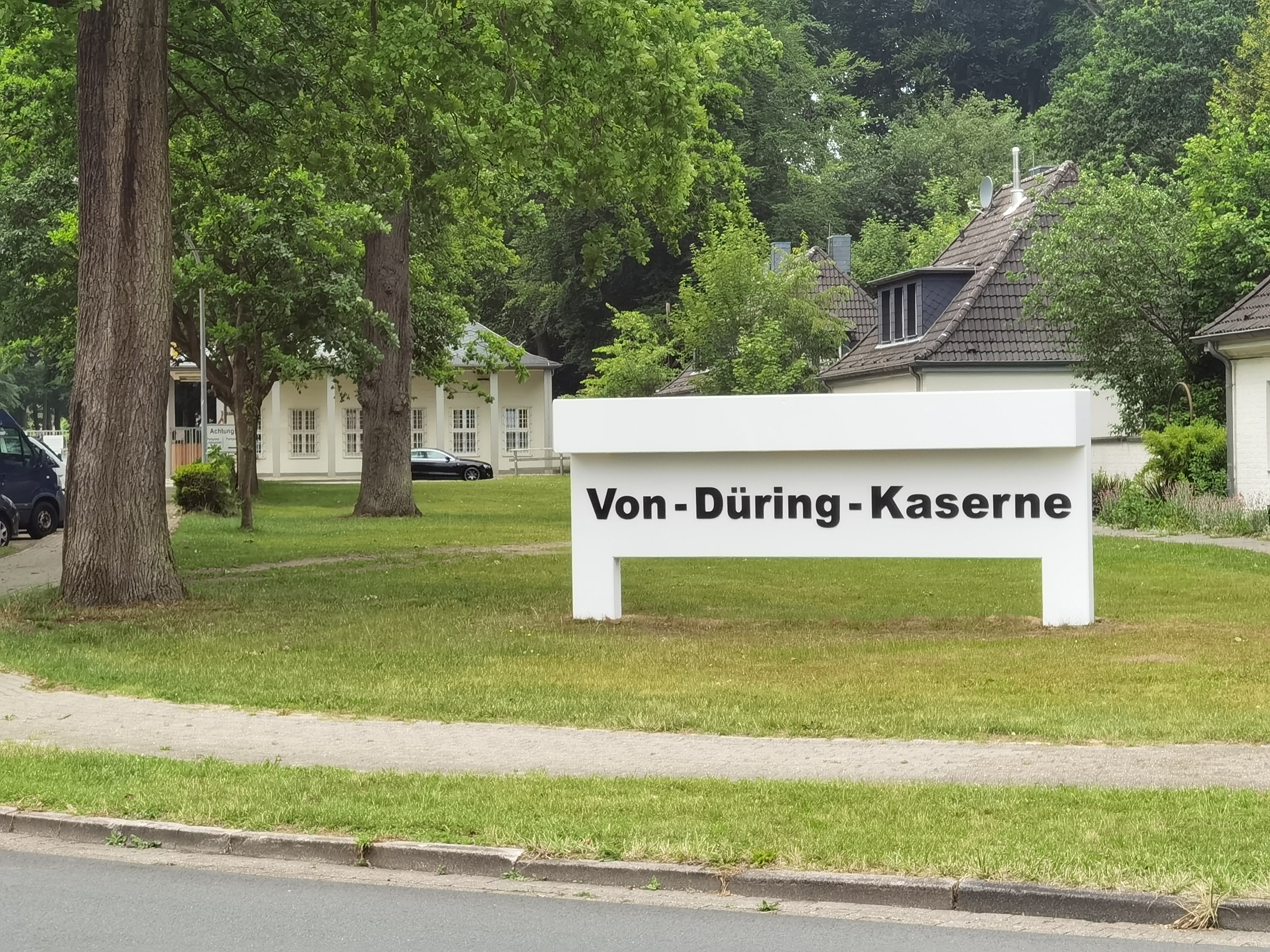
The Von-Düring Barracks

On 18 March 2018, the Bundeswehr released the latest regulations on military tradition (Traditionserlass) which stipulates that "The Bundeswehr does not maintain a tradition of people, troop units and military institutions in German (military) history who, according to today's understanding, have acted in a criminal, racist or inhuman manner." Based on these regulations, it was decided that the Lent Barracks would be renamed. Following an inquiry submitted by the Left Party on 8 October 2019, the Cabinet of Germany responded that members of the Lent Barracks had proposed renaming the barracks after forester and Freikorps officer Johann Christian von Düring. On 8 June 2020, the barracks was officially renamed the Von-Düring Barracks.

== Summary of career ==
=== Aerial victory claims ===
Lent is officially credited with 111 victories in 507 flights. The total includes 103 victories at night, during which he destroyed 59 four-engine bombers and one Mosquito, among other types. Lent received a posthumous promotion to Oberst (Colonel). (Note: According to Jerry Scutts 113 victories of which 102 at night.) Mathews and Foreman, authors of Luftwaffe Aces — Biographies and Victory Claims, researched the German Federal Archives and found documentation for 111 aerial victory claims, including seven as a Zerstörer pilot and 104 as a night fighter pilot, plus three further unconfirmed claims.

The majority of his victories were claimed with detailed geographical locations. However, two of his victories were claimed in a Planquadrat (grid reference), for example "QE-PE". The Luftwaffe grid map (Jägermeldenetz) was composed of rectangles measuring 15 minutes of latitude by 30 minutes of longitude, an area of about 360 square miles (930 km^{2}).

Chronicle of aerial victories
This and the ! (exclamation mark) indicates those aerial victories not listed by Hinchliffe. This and the # (hash mark) indicates those aerial victories not listed by Foreman, Mathews and Parry. This along with the + (plus) indicates almost certain identification. This along with the * (asterisk) indicates probable identification. This along with the ? (question mark) indicates possible identification.
Claim (total)	Claim (nocturnal)	Date	Time	Type	Location	Serial No./Squadron No.
– 1. Staffel of Zerstörergeschwader 76 –
1		3 September 1939	17:10	PZL P.24	Lodz region	Polish Air Force+
2		18 December 1939	14:40	Wellington	near Borkum	N2888/No. 37 Squadron RAF+
3		18 December 1939	14:45	Wellington	near Borkum	N2889/No. 37 Squadron RAF+
4		9 April 1940	08:55	Gladiator	Bratenjordet	427/NAAS+
5		27 May 1940	08:20	Gladiator	Bodø	No. 263 Squadron RAF+
6		2 June 1940	14:25	Gladiator	Norway	N5893/No. 263 Squadron RAF+
7		15 June 1940	12:45	Blenheim	near Trondheim	L9408/No. 254 Squadron RAF+
– 6. Staffel of Nachtjagdgeschwader 1 –
8	1	12 May 1941	01:40	Wellington	southwest of Süderstapel	R1330/No. 40 Squadron RAF*
9	2	12 May 1941	02:49	Wellington	southwest of Nordstrand	R1461/No. 40 Squadron RAF*
10	3	28 June 1941	01:58	Whitley	15 km (9.3 mi) west of Bremervörde	T4297/No. 102 Squadron RAF+
11	4	30 June 1941	01:40	Stirling	10 km (6.2 mi) south Wesermünde	N6001/No. 7 Squadron RAF*
12	5	30 June 1941	02:05	Stirling	20 km (12 mi) southwest of Bremervörde	N3664/No. 7 Squadron RAF*
– 4. Staffel of Nachtjagdgeschwader 1 –
13	6	4 July 1941	00:43	Wellington	Exloermond, 23 km (14 mi) southeast of Assen	R1492/No. 301 Polish Bomber Squadron+
14!	7!	4 July 1941	03:41	unknown		
15	8	6 July 1941	00:56	Whitley	8 km (5.0 mi) west of Coevorden	Z6793/No. 10 Squadron RAF+
16	9	8 July 1941	00:55	Whitley	20 km (12 mi) southeast of Assen	Z6799/No. 77 Squadron RAF+
17	10	10 July 1941	02:20	Wellington	10 km (6.2 mi) northwest of Meppen	B1770/No. 40 Squadron RAF+
18	11	13 July 1941	00:55	Hampden	Veendam, 25 km (16 mi) southeast of Groningen	AE226/No. 50 Squadron RAF*
19	12	15 July 1941	00:49	Wellington	Veendam, 25 km (16 mi) southeast of Groningen	W5513/No. 104 Squadron RAF+
20	13	25 July 1941	03:54	Wellington	13 km (8.1 mi) south-southwest of Leeuwarden	R1369/No. 57 Squadron RAF?
21	14	15 August 1941	03:20	Whitley	north of Ameland	Z6819/No. 51 Squadron RAF+
22	15	29 August 1941	03:40	Hampden	south of Ameland	AE126/No. 49 Squadron RAF+
23	16	7 September 1941	01:25	Whitley	east of Leeuwarden, Bergen aan Zee	Z6681/No. 78 Squadron RAF+
24	17	8 September 1941	04:04	Wellington	Terwipsel, northeast Franeker	Z8845/No. 9 Squadron RAF*
25	18	8 September 1941	04:59	Wellington	Drachten, southeast of Leeuwarden	R1798/No. 115 Squadron RAF+
26	19	13 October 1941	00:06	Wellington	Westergeest, northeast of Leeuwarden	X9822/No. 40 Squadron RAF+
27	20	13 October 1941	00:33	Hampden	Zuiderzee	AD965/No. 144 Squadron RAF+
– II. Gruppe of Nachtjagdgeschwader 2 –
28	21	8 November 1941	01:21	Wellington	north of Akkrum	X9976/No. 75 Squadron RAF+
29	22	17 January 1942	21:40	Whitley	Terschelling	Z9301/No. 51 Squadron RAF*
30	23	21 January 1942	22:38	Whitley	40 km (25 mi) west of Terschelling	Z9311/No. 51 Squadron RAF+
31		6 February 1942	15:14	Hampden	70 km (43 mi) west of Terschelling	AE308/No. 455 Squadron RAF+
32	24	26 March 1942	00:32	Manchester	10 km (6.2 mi) north of Alkmaar	L7518/No. 61 Squadron RAF+
33	25	27 March 1942	22:10	Hampden	north of Terschelling	No. 408 Squadron RAF
34	26	27 March 1942	22:42	Hampden	north of Terschelling	No. 408 Squadron RAF
35	27	29 March 1942	22:00	Manchester	north of Terschelling	L7394/No. 61 Squadron RAF?
36	28	11 April 1942	00:23	Wellington	20 km (12 mi) southeast of Den Helder	Z8838/No. 311 Squadron RAF+
37	29	13 April 1942	00:32	Hampden	north of Terschelling	P1239/No. 420 Squadron RAF*
38	30	18 April 1942	01:55	Wellington	25 km (16 mi) north of Tershelling	Z1267/No. 300 Squadron RAF*
39	31	15 May 1942	22:45	Hudson	north of Terschelling	X3482/No. 9 Squadron RAF?
40	32	3 June 1942	01:06	Hampden	east of Medemblik	AT154/No. 408 Squadron RAF+
41	33	4 June 1942	00:55	Halifax	west of Sint Maartensvlotbrug, north-northwest of Alkmaar	R9457/No. 76 Squadron RAF+
42	34	6 June 1942	00:34	Wellington	south of Hoorn	DV812/No. 156 Squadron RAF+
43	35	6 June 1942	01:16	Wellington	IJsselmeer, east of Amsterdam	Z1331/No. 301 Polish Bomber Squadron+
44	36	21 June 1942	00:59	Hampden	north of Ameland	AT185/No. 420 Squadron RAF+
45	37	24 June 1942	01:12	Wellington	10 km (6.2 mi) north of Tershelling	T2921/No. 103 Squadron RAF+
46	38	24 June 1942	01:46	Wellington	northwest of Vlieland	DV831/No. 103 Squadron RAF+
47	39	26 June 1942	02:37	Wellington	6 km (3.7 mi) northwest of Enkhuizen	T2612/No. 18 Operational Training Unit RAF*
48	40	26 June 1942	02:56	Whitley	Noordwijk	BD266/No. 24 Operational Training Unit RAF*
49	41	3 July 1942	01:25	Wellington	southwest of Assen	Z1314/No. 301 Polish Bomber Squadron*
50	42	9 July 1942	01:30	Wellington	Rottumeroog	X3557/No. 75 Squadron RAF+
51	43	27 July 1942	02:35	Halifax	northwest of Vlieland	
52	44	27 July 1942	02:39	Wellington	northwest of Vlieland	
53	45	5 September 1942	02:50	Halifax	15 km (9.3 mi) southeast of Leeuwarden	R5682/No. 61 Squadron RAF*
54	46	14 September 1942	05:02	Wellington	northwest of Terschelling	
55	47	9 November 1942	20:37	Halifax	Ameland	W7864/No. 102 Squadron RAF*
– IV. Gruppe of Nachtjagdgeschwader 1 –
56	48	17 December 1942	20:22	Lancaster	north of Sloten	ED355/No. 44 Squadron RAF+
57	49	17 December 1942	20:38	Halifax	east of Urk	ED333/No. 44 Squadron RAF*
58!	50!	2 January 1943	20:24	four-engined bomber		
59	51	8 January 1943	20:24	Lancaster	10 km (6.2 mi) west of Texel	
60	52	21 January 1943	20:11	Wellington	north of Schiermonnikoog	
61	53	1 March 1943	21:39	Halifax	8 km (5.0 mi) north of Ameland	DT641/No. 419 Squadron RAF*
62	54	5 March 1943	22:20	Halifax	10 km (6.2 mi) west of Harlingen	BB282/No. 76 Squadron RAF?
63	55	5 March 1943	22:34	Halifax	10 km (6.2 mi) east of Wieringen	W4847/No. 83 Squadron RAF*
64	56	29 March 1943	23:46	Wellington	northwest of Lemmer	BJ762/No. 426 Squadron RAF+
65	57	4 April 1943	00:24	Lancaster	15 km (9.3 mi) east of Texel	
66	58	20 April 1943	03:38	Mosquito	west of Stavoren	DZ694/No. 410 Squadron RAF
67	59	5 May 1943	00:08	Stirling	8 km (5.0 mi) south of Enkhuizen	BK773/No. 7 Squadron RAF+
68	60	5 May 1943	00:18	Stirling	1 km (0.62 mi) southeast of Hommerts	EF343/No. 149 Squadron RAF+
69	61	14 May 1943	02:54	Halifax	4 km (2.5 mi) north of Harlingen	JB924/No. 78 Squadron RAF+
70	62	24 May 1943	02:16	Lancaster	southwest of Workum	DT789/No. 10 Squadron RAF
71	63	22 June 1943	03:09	Lancaster	70 km (43 mi) west of Vlieland	
72	64	23 June 1943	02:06	Halifax	7 km (4.3 mi) west of Urk	
73	65	26 June 1943	01:13	Wellington	west of Urk	HF544/No. 466 Squadron RAF+
74#	66#	28 July 1943	02:37	Lancaster	northwest of Terschelling	
75	67	30 July 1943	02:10	Lancaster	25 km (16 mi) north of Ameland	
– Stab of Nachtjagdgeschwader 3 –
76	68	24 August 1943	00:56	Stirling	Berlin-Lichtenberg	
77	69	24 August 1943	01:16	Halifax	Berlin-Mahlsdorf	
78	70	24 August 1943	—	Halifax (Note: According to Hincliffe, this aerial victory was over a Lancaster bomber claimed over Berlin-Tegel.)	Berlin-Spandau	
79	71	1 September 1943	00:54	Halifax	southwest of Berlin	
80	72	1 September 1943	01:03	Halifax	east of Berlin	
81	73	22 September 1943	22:41	Stirling	Krohnsberg	
82	74	3 October 1943	22:27	Stirling	Herleshausen	
83	75	2 December 1943	19:58	Lancaster	Magdeburg	
84	76	2 December 1943	20:20	Stirling	southwest of Berlin	
85	77	16 December 1943	19:07	Lancaster	Almanbrück	
86#	78#	2 January 1944	02:49	Lancaster		
87	79	14 January 1944	18:49	Lancaster		
88	80	14 January 1944	19:05	Lancaster		
89	81	14 January 1944	19:10	Lancaster		
90	82	21 January 1944	22:28	Lancaster		
91	83	21 January 1944	22:58	Lancaster		
92	84	22 March 1944	21:26	Lancaster	near Bielefeld	
93	85	22 March 1944	21:35	four-engined bomber	south of Bielefeld	
94	86	24 March 1944	21:30	four-engined bomber	Berlin area	
95	87	24 March 1944	22:00	four-engined bomber	Lübeck	
96	88	31 March 1944	01:21	four-engined bomber	20–40 km (12–25 mi) north of Nürnberg	Halifax MZ508/No. 578 Squadron RAF?
97#	89#	23 April 1944	—	Lancaster		
98	90	23 May 1944	00:21	four-engined bomber	Osnabrück	
99	91	23 May 1944	00:40	four-engined bomber	near Osnabrück	
100	92	16 June 1944	00:52	Lancaster	southwest of Lille	
101	93	16 June 1944	00:56	Lancaster	Béthune-Armentières	
102	94	16 June 1944	01:00	Lancaster	northwest Béthune	
103	95	25 June 1944	00:25	four-engined bomber	QE-PE	
104	96	25 June 1944	00:40	four-engined bomber	QE-PE	
105	97	28 June 1944	01:10	four-engined bomber	off Dunkirk	Lancaster ME743/No. 44 Squadron RAF
106!	98!	19 July 1944	01:36	four-engined bomber	southeast of Reims	
107	99	19 July 1944	01:41	four-engined bomber	50 km (31 mi) southeast of Reims	
108	100	21 July 1944	02:07	Lancaster	over the sea, near Deal	
109	101	25 July 1944	01:14	four-engined bomber	Pforzheim	
110	102	29 July 1944	01:47	four-engined bomber	near Bouxwiller	
111	103	29 July 1944	01:57	four-engined bomber	near Château-Salins	
112#	104#	17 August 1944	—	four-engined bomber		
113#	105#	12 September 1944	—	Lancaster		
114#	106#	17 September 1944	—	Lancaster		

=== Awards ===
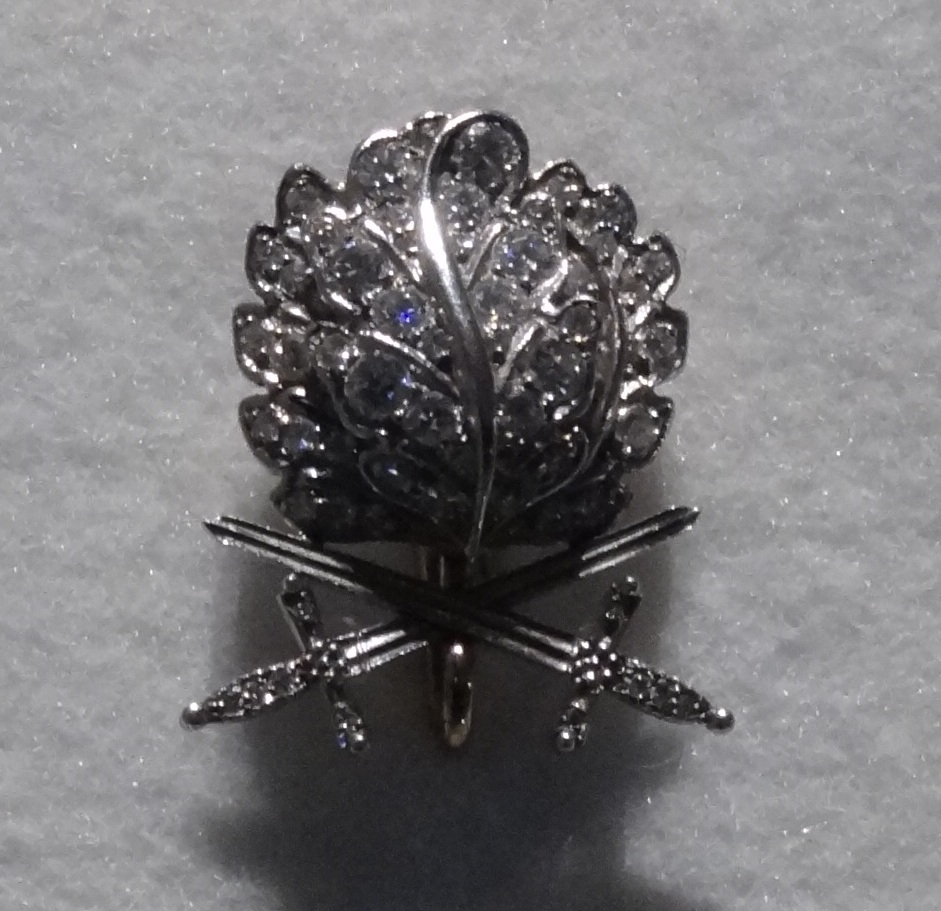
Lent's Oak Leaves, Swords and Diamonds on display at the Bundeswehr Military History Museum in Dresden

- Pilot's Badge (15 November 1937)
- Sudetenland Medal with the “Prague Castle” clasp
- Wehrmacht Long Service Award, 4th Class
- Iron Cross (1939)
  - 2nd class (21 September 1939)
  - 1st class (11 May 1940)
- Narvik Shield (30 January 1941)
- Honour Goblet of the Luftwaffe (Ehrenpokal der Luftwaffe) on 26 June 1941
- Wound Badge (1939)
  - in Black (14 July 1941)
  - in Silver (22 December 1943)
- Front Flying Clasp of the Luftwaffe for Destroyer Pilots in Gold
- Front Flying Clasp of the Luftwaffe for Nightfighter Pilots in Gold with Pennant "300"
- Combined Pilots-Observation Badge in Gold with Diamonds
- Six references in the Wehrmachtbericht
- German Cross in Gold on 9 April 1942 as Hauptmann in the II./Nachtjagdgeschwader 2
- Knight's Cross of the Iron Cross with Oak Leaves, Swords and Diamonds
  - Knight's Cross on 30 August 1941 as Oberleutnant and Staffelkapitän of the 6./Nachtjagdgeschwader 1 (Note: According to Scherzer as Staffelkapitän of the 4./NJG 1)
  - 98th Oak Leaves on 6 June 1942 as Hauptmann and Gruppenkommandeur of the II./Nachtjagdgeschwader 2
  - 32nd Swords on 2 August 1943 as Major and Gruppenkommandeur of the IV./Nachtjagdgeschwader 1
  - 15th Diamonds on 31 July 1944 as Oberstleutnant and Geschwaderkommodore of the Nachtjagdgeschwader 3

=== Promotions ===
6 April 1936:	Fahnenjunker (Officer Candidate)
1 October 1936:	Fahnenjunker-Gefreiter (Officer Candidate with Lance Corporal rank)
1 December 1936:	Fahnenjunker-Unteroffizier (Officer Candidate with Corporal/NCO/Junior Sergeant rank)
20 April 1937:	Fähnrich (Ensign/Officer Cadet) with effect from 1 April 1937
1 February 1938:	Oberfähnrich (Senior Ensign/Senior Officer Cadet)
24 February 1938:	Leutnant (Second Lieutenant) with effect from 1 January 1938
22 June 1940:	Oberleutnant (First Lieutenant) with effect from 1 June 1940
1 January 1942:	Hauptmann (Captain)
1 January 1943:	Major (22 June 1943 received Rank Seniority from 1 July 1943)
1 March 1944:	Oberstleutnant (Lieutenant Colonel) with Rank Seniority (RDA) from 1 May 1944
Posthumously:	Oberst (Colonel)

== Notes ==
Military offices
Preceded by Major Johann Schalk	Commander of Nachtjagdgeschwader 3; 1 August 1943 – 7 October 1944	Succeeded by Oberst Günther Radusch
