= Paul Gildner =

German World War II fighter pilot

- Born: 1 February 1914; Nimptsch, Kingdom of Prussia, German Empire
- Died: 24 February 1943 (aged 29); Gilze en Rijen, German-occupied Netherlands
- Burial place: Ysselsteyn German war cemetery, Netherlands (Block M-row 4-grave 81)
- Military career
- Allegiance: Nazi Germany
- Branch: Luftwaffe
- Service years: 1933–1943
- Rank: Oberleutnant (first lieutenant)
- Units: ZG 1 NJG 1
- Conflicts: See battles World War II: Invasion of Poland; Battle of France; Battle of Britain; Defense of the Reich †
- Awards: Knight's Cross of the Iron Cross with Oak Leaves

Paul Gildner (1 February 1914 – 24 February 1943) was a German Luftwaffe military aviator during World War II, a night fighter ace credited with 44 aerial victories, including two by day, claimed in approximately 160 combat missions making him one of the more successful night fighter pilots in the Luftwaffe. (Note: For a list of Luftwaffe night fighter aces see List of German World War II night fighter aces.) All of his victories were claimed over the Western Front in Defense of the Reich missions against the Royal Air Force's (RAF) Bomber Command.

Born in Nimptsch, Gildner grew up in the Weimar Republic and Nazi Germany. Following graduation from school and the compulsory Reichsarbeitsdienst (Reich Labour Service), he joined the military service in 1933, at first with an infantry regiment before he transferred to the Luftwaffe in 1935. Trained as a pilot, Gildner served with Zerstörergeschwader 1 (ZG 1—1st Destroyer Wing), flying a Messerschmitt Bf 110 heavy fighter, at the start of World War II. He claimed his first aerial victory during the Battle of France. In June 1940, the Luftwaffe created its first night fighter wing, Nachtjagdgeschwader 1 (NJG 1—1st Night Fighter Wing), and Gildner transferred to this unit. There he claimed his first nocturnal aerial victory on the night of 2/3 September 1940. On 9 July 1941, he was awarded the Knight's Cross of the Iron Cross after his 16th aerial victory, 14 of which claimed at night. At the end of 1941, Gildner was the second leading night fighter pilot of the Luftwaffe.

Gildner was appointed squadron leader of 1. Staffel (1st squadron) of NJG 1 in February 1943. After crash landing his Me-110 following engine failure, Gildner couldn't escape from his burning plane and perished in the flames. Posthumously, Gildner was awarded the Knight's Cross of the Iron Cross with Oak Leaves on 26 February 1943.

== Early life and career ==
Gildner was born on 1 February 1914 in Nimptsch, present-day Niemcza in the Lower Silesian Voivodeship of south-western Poland, at the time in the Province of Silesia in the German Empire. Following graduation from school and a vocational education in metalworking, he completed his compulsory labour service (Reichsarbeitsdienst).

In early 1933, Gildner joined the military service of the Reichswehr as a cadet with Infanterie-Regiment 7 in Schweidnitz, an infantry regiment of the 3rd Division. In 1935, he was transferred to the newly emerging Luftwaffe of the Wehrmacht. In 1937, he began flight training, (Note: Flight training in the Luftwaffe progressed through the levels A1, A2 and B1, B2, referred to as A/B flight training. A training included theoretical and practical training in aerobatics, navigation, long-distance flights and dead-stick landings. The B courses included high-altitude flights, instrument flights, night landings and training to handle the aircraft in difficult situations. For pilots destined to fly multi-engine aircraft, the training was completed with the Luftwaffe Advanced Pilot's Certificate (Erweiterter Luftwaffen-Flugzeugführerschein), also known as the C-Certificate.) and was promoted to Unteroffizier (subordinate officer) on 1 September 1937. After he completed flight training, Gildner was posted to an aerial reconnaissance unit where he served as a pilot. In the fall of 1938, he was posted to the 6. Staffel (6th Squadron) of Jagdgeschwader 132 "Richthofen" (JG 132—132nd Fighter Wing), (Note: For an explanation of Luftwaffe unit designations see Organization of the Luftwaffe during World War II.) named after the World War I fighter ace Manfred von Richthofen. This squadron was subordinated to the II. Gruppe (2nd group) of JG 132. On 1 November 1938, II. Gruppe was detached from JG 132 and was reassigned as I. Gruppe of Zerstörergeschwader 141 (ZG 141—141st Destroyer Wing). I./ZG 141 was based at Jüterbog-Damm and was equipped with the Messerschmitt Bf 109 D-1. On 1 May 1939, I./ZG 141 was renamed again and became the I. Gruppe of Zerstörergeschwader 1 (ZG 1—1st Destroyer Wing) and was the equipped with the Messerschmitt Bf 110 heavy fighter.

== World War II ==
World War II in Europe had begun on Friday 1 September 1939 when German forces invaded Poland. Flying with I./ZG 1, Gildner participated in the invasion of Poland and the Norwegian Campaign. In February 1940, I./ZG 1 was placed under the command of Hauptmann (Captain) Wolfgang Falck. With the start of the Norwegian Campaign in April 1940, I./ZG 1 was moved to Aalborg airfield. There, the airfield came under night attacks by the Royal Air Force (RAF) Bomber Command, leading Falck to conduct his first experiments of nocturnal aerial combat.

During the Battle of France, Gildner claimed his first aerial victory on 10 May 1940 over a Bristol Blenheim bomber in the vicinity of Waalhaven. His second and last daytime aerial victory was claimed over a French Morane-Saulnier M.S.406 fighter on 5 June 1940.

=== Night fighter career ===
A map of part of the Kammhuber Line. The 'belt' and night fighter 'boxes' are shown.

Following the 1939 aerial Battle of the Heligoland Bight, RAF attacks shifted to the cover of darkness, initiating the Defence of the Reich campaign. By mid-1940, Generalmajor (Brigadier General) Josef Kammhuber had established a night air defense system dubbed the Kammhuber Line. It consisted of a series of control sectors equipped with radars and searchlights and an associated night fighter. Each sector named a Himmelbett (canopy bed) would direct the night fighter into visual range with target bombers. In 1941, the Luftwaffe started equipping night fighters with airborne radar such as the Lichtenstein radar. This airborne radar did not come into general use until early 1942.

Following the Battle of France, Falck was tasked with the creation of the Luftwaffe's first night fighter wing, Nachtjagdgeschwader 1 (NJG 1—1st Night Fighter Wing). His former unit, I./ZG 1 formed the nucleus of I. Gruppe of NJG 1 which was placed under the command of Oberleutnant (First Lieutenant) Werner Streib. Now flying in the 3. Staffel of NJG 1, Gildner claimed his first aerial victory as a night fighter pilot on the night of 2/3 September 1940. The bomber, a Handley Page Hampden from the RAF No. 144 Squadron, was shot down near Sittard on its mission to bomb Ludwigshafen. The Hampden was identified as P4370, the pilot and another crewmember were taken prisoner of war and two further crewmembers were killed in action. On 18/19 September 1940, Gildner was credited with the destruction of two Armstrong Whitworth Whitley bombers. The first bomber was Whitley V P5008 from No. 58 Squadron was on a bombing mission to Hamm and crashed southeast of Groenlo. The second Whitley N1425 from No. 77 Squadron, on a mission to Soest, was shot down near Zieuwent. On 13 March 1941 Gildner accounted for Wellington Mark I C N2746 BU-M from 214 Squadron during a British attack on Hamburg. Flight Lieutenant Dickinson, DFC, and his crew with the exception of the tail gunner, perished. Gildner was photographed inspecting the wreck. Gildner achieved another success on 8 April, downing Sergeant Boyer's No. 51 Squadron RAF Whitley T4298 near Gröningen. Five of the crew including Boyer became prisoners.

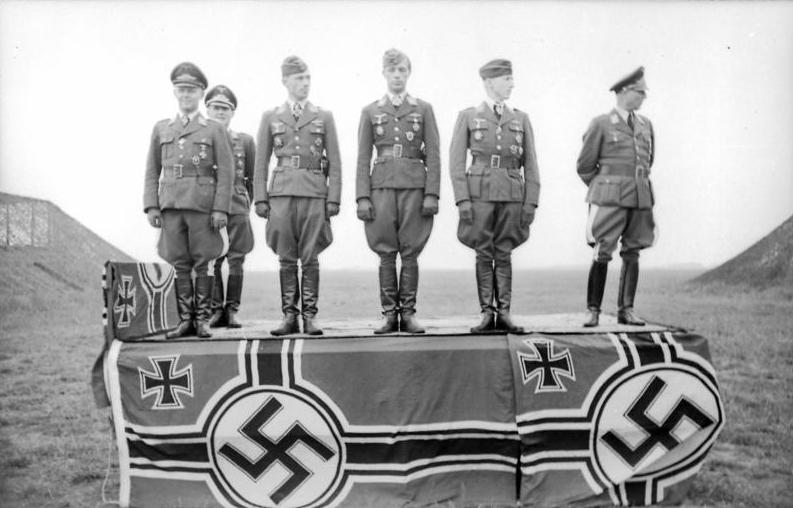
From left to right, Kammhuber, Lent, Gildner, Becker.

On 9 July 1941, after his 16th aerial victory, 14 of which claimed at night, Gildner was awarded the Knight's Cross of the Iron Cross (Ritterkreuz des Eisernen Kreuzes). Following Falck and Streib, he was the third soldier of the night fighter force and first noncommissioned officer to receive this distinction. The presentation of the Knight's Cross was made by Kammhuber, at the time commander of the 1. Nachtjagd-Division (1st Night Fighter Division).

Whitley V Z9306 KN-S, No. 77 Squadron RAF, formed part of the Düsseldorf raid during the night of 27/28 December 1941. Gildner shot it down over Friesland northwest of Leeuwarden near 'Zwarte Haan'. Four of the crew died from exposure after landing in the water. Their names, ranks and family are memorialised in the cemetery at the town Sint Jacobiparochie.

With 21 nocturnal aerial victories claimed, Gildner was the second highest scoring night fighter pilot at the end of 1941. At the time, in first place was Streib with 22 nocturnal aerial victories claimed, and in third place with 20 nocturnal victories was Helmut Lent. On 18 May 1942, Gildner was awarded the German Cross in Gold (Deutsches Kreuz in Gold) and was promoted from Oberfeldwebel to Oberleutnant (first lieutenant), bypassing the rank of Leutnant (second lieutenant) in July. On 8/9 March 1942, Gildner shot down the Avro Manchester bomber R5779 from No. 83 Squadron on its mission to bomb Essen. The aircraft crashed near Smilde. Bristol Blenheim Z7307 from 114 Squadron was shot down by Gildner after taking off for an intruder sortie from West Raynham. Flight Sergeant W Popplestone and his crew died. Gildner likely accounted for a 106 Squadron Lancaster during the British attack on Wilhelmshaven on 8/9 July 1942. Lent, operating in the vicinity, accounted for a No. 75 Squadron RAF Wellington. Gildner's opponent was the only Lancaster lost in the raid out of 52 committed.

=== Squadron leader and death ===
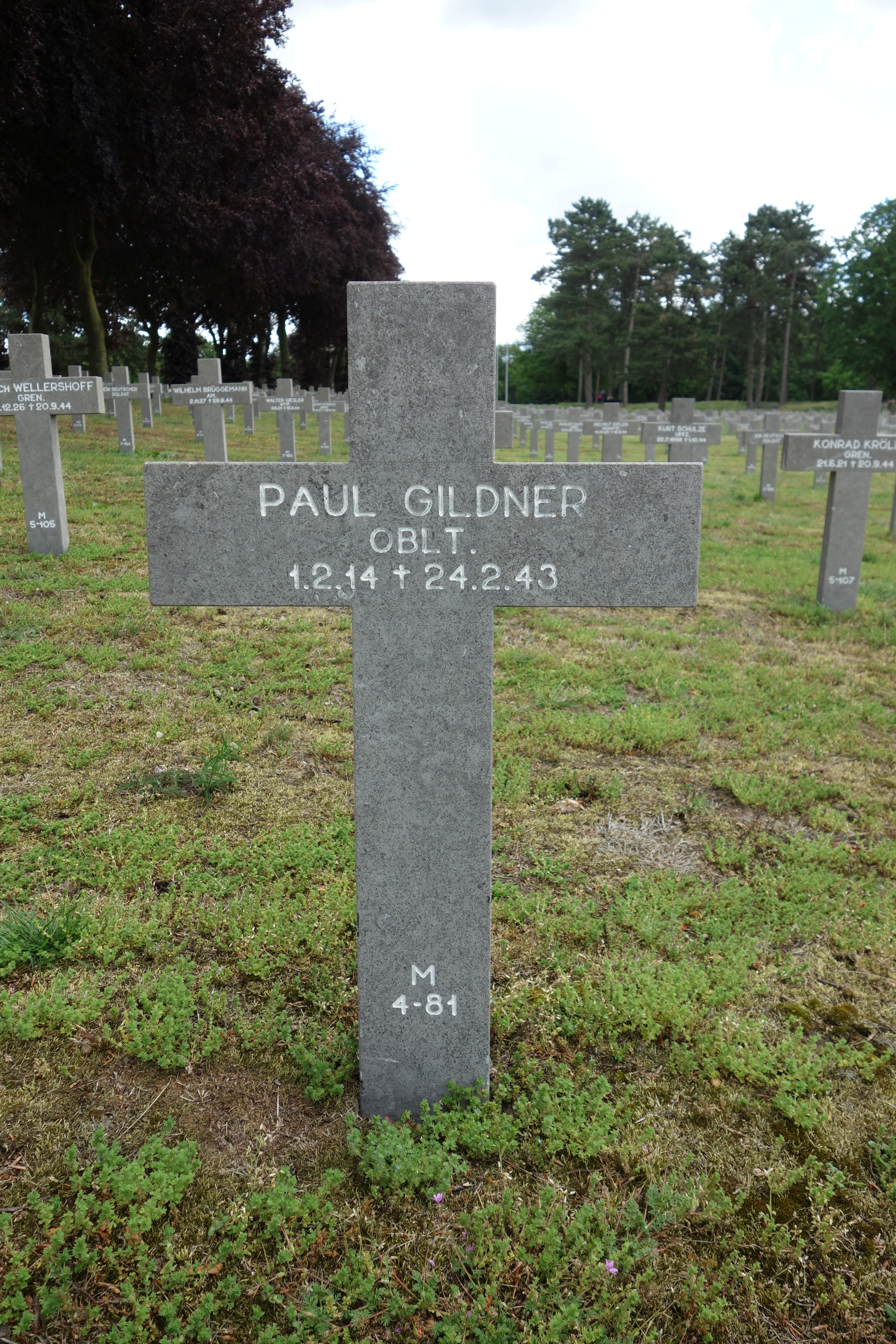
German War Cemetery Ysselsteyn - Paul Gildner

On 3 February 1943, Gildner was on his way to Gilze en Rijen to take command of 3. Staffel of NJG 1 when his friend and commander of 1. Staffel of NJG 1, Oberleutnant Reinhold Knacke, was killed in action. In consequence of this event, Gildner was appointed Staffelkapitän (squadron leader) of 1. Staffel instead. On the night of 14/15 February 1943, Gildner claimed the destruction of a Vickers Wellington and Boeing B-17 Flying Fortress bomber. The Wellington was likely HE169 from No. 196 Squadron which crashed into the North Sea west of Schouwen, killing the crew. The B-17 appears to have been misidentified. In Bowman's account, the aircraft lost was Short Stirling I BF438 WP-D from No. 90 Squadron. The Stirling crashed west of Vlissingen with loss of the crew. According to Boiten, the Stirling may have been BK627 also from No. 90 Squadron.

Gildner claimed his last two aerial victories on the night of 19/20 February 1943. The claim over two Halifax bombers north of Vlieland may have been misidentified Avro Lancaster bombers from No. 156 Squadron RAF and No. 467 Squadron RAAF (Royal Australian Air Force). On 24 February 1943 flying near Fliegerhorst Gilze-Rijenin the Netherlands in his Messerschmitt Bf 110 G-4 (Werksnummer 4846—factory number), he attempted landing but had visibility issues due to fog and engine trouble. Following engine failure and fire, he ordered his radio operator Unteroffizier Heinz Huhn to bail out. and crash landed his aircraft at a crossroads on the outskirts of the town Dongen, just near Fliegerhorst Gilze-Rijen at 22.45 hrs. Still alive but unable to escape the aircraft, Gildner perished in the flames. Two eye witnesses wanted to help him but were kept at a distance by the exploding ammunition. Gildner was posthumously awarded the Knight's Cross of the Iron Cross with Oak Leaves (Ritterkreuz des Eisernen Kreuzes mit Eichenlaub) on 26 February 1943. He was the 196th member of the German armed forces to be so honored. Gildner is buried at the German War Cemetery Ysselsteyn (Block M—Row 4—Grave 81) at Venray.

== Summary of career ==
=== Aerial victory claims ===
Gildner was credited with 44—two daytime and 42 nighttime—aerial victories, claimed in about 160 combat missions. Foreman, Parry and Mathews, authors of Luftwaffe Night Fighter Claims 1939 – 1945, researched the German Federal Archives and found records for 41 nocturnal victory claims. Mathews and Foreman also published Luftwaffe Aces — Biographies and Victory Claims, listing Gildner with 43 claims, including two as a Zerstörer pilot, plus one further unconfirmed claim.

Chronicle of aerial victories
This and the ? (question mark) indicates discrepancies between Luftwaffe Night Fighter Claims 1939 – 1945 and Luftwaffe Aces — Biographies and Victory Claims.
Claim (total)	Claim (nocturnal)	Date	Time	Type	Location	Serial No./Squadron No.
– 3. Staffel of Zerstörergeschwader 1 –
1		10 May 1940	12:00	Blenheim	Waalhaven	
2		5 June 1940	—	M.S.406		
– 3. Staffel of Nachtjagdgeschwader 1 –
3	1	3 September 1940	00:45	Hampden	9 km (5.6 mi) south of Sittard	Hampden I P4370 from No. 144 Squadron
4	2	18 September 1940	23:25	Whitley	3 km (1.9 mi) southeast of Groenlo	Whitley V P5008 from No. 58 Squadron
5	3	19 September 1940	00:28	Whitley	Zieuwent	Whitley N1425 from No. 77 Squadron
– 4. Staffel of Nachtjagdgeschwader 1 –
6	4	1 March 1941	02:58	Blenheim	vicinity of Groningen	Blenheim IV T1895 from No. 105 Squadron
7	5	13 March 1941	22:48	Blenheim	Tolbert	Blenheim IV Z5901 from No. 21 Squadron
8	6	13 March 1941	23:10	Wellington	vicinity of Burlanger	Wellington IC N2746 BU-M from No. 214 Squadron
9	7	8 April 1941	00:27	Whitley	8 km (5.0 mi) southeast of Groningen	
10	8	10 April 1941	01:07	Wellington	IJsselmeer	
11	9	9 May 1941	02:47	Whitley	east of Enkhuizen	
12	10	19 June 1941	01:38	Wellington	over sea near Ameland	
13	11	19 June 1941	02:34	Wellington	57 km (35 mi) north of Ameland	
14	12	19 June 1941	02:57	Whitley	47 km (29 mi) north of Ameland	
15	13	30 June 1941	02:43	Whitley	10 km (6.2 mi) north-northwest of Ameland	
16	14	9 July 1941	00:58	Hampden	north of Groningen	
17	15	17 July 1941	03:27	Wellington	southwest of Harlingen	
18	16	15 August 1941	04:43	Whitley	8 km (5.0 mi) west-southwest of Terschelling	
19	17	13 October 1941	04:05	Whitley	10 km (6.2 mi) southwest of Roosendaal	
20	18	31 October 1941	21:30	Wellington	Schiermonnikoog	
21	19	31 October 1941	23:50	Whitley	east of Texel	
– 5. Staffel of Nachtjagdgeschwader 2 –
22	20	30 November 1941	23:05	Wellington	20 km (12 mi) east-northeast of Leeuwarden	
23	21	27 December 1941	19:57	Whitley	15 km (9.3 mi) northwest of Leeuwarden	
24	22	20 January 1942	20:58	Hampden	7 km (4.3 mi) southeast of Groningen	Hampden I AT148 EA-S from No. 49 Squadron
25	23	3 March 1942	21:20	Wellington	20 km (12 mi) northwest of Terschelling	
26	24	9 March 1942	03:49	Manchester	3 km (1.9 mi) southeast of Smilde	Manchester R5779 from No. 83 Squadron
27	25	13 March 1942	02:05	Wellington	northwest of Vlieland	
28	26	26 March 1942	22:30	Hampden	north of Vlieland	
29	27	26 March 1942	22:57	Hampden	northwest of Terschelling	
30	28	26 March 1942	23:57	Blenheim	Waddenzee, north of Wieringen	Blenheim IV Z7307 RT-L from No. 114 Squadron
31	29	9 April 1942	02:07	Wellington	20 km (12 mi) northwest of Vlieland	
32	30	23 April 1942	00:07	Hampden	northwest of Ameland	
33	31	3 June 1942	03:10	Stirling	70 km (43 mi) west of Petten	
34	32	9 June 1942	02:18	Halifax	Western Front	
35	33	9 July 1942	02:44	Lancaster	30 km (19 mi) northwest of Ameland	
36? (Note: According to Luftwaffe Aces — Biographies and Victory Claims, this claim was unconfirmed while Luftwaffe Night Fighter Claims 1939 – 1945 confirm this claim.)	34	29 July 1942	01:27	Stirling	20 km (12 mi) northwest of Terschelling	
37	35	12 August 1942	01:55	Halifax	vicinity of Ameland	
38	36	4 September 1942	02:20	Wellington	southwest of Norden Westermarsch	
– 11. Staffel of Nachtjagdgeschwader 1 –
39	37	13 October 1942	23:19	Halifax	15 km (9.3 mi) north of Schiermonnikoog	
– IV. Gruppe of Nachtjagdgeschwader 1 –
40	38	14 February 1943	21:47	Wellington	20 km (12 mi) west of Schouwen	Wellington HE169 from No. 196 Squadron
41	39	14 February 1943	22:07	B-17	45 km (28 mi) west of Vlissingen	Stirling I BF438 WP-D from No. 90 Squadron
42	40	19 February 1943	21:05	Halifax	20 km (12 mi) north of Vlieland	
43	41	19 February 1943	21:16	Halifax	15 km (9.3 mi) north of Vlieland	

=== Awards ===
- Iron Cross (1939) 2nd and 1st Class
- German Cross in Gold on 18 May 1942 as Oberfeldwebel in the 5./Nachtjagdgeschwader 2
- Knight's Cross of the Iron Cross with Oak Leaves
  - Knight's Cross on 9 July 1941 as Oberfeldwebel and pilot in the 3./Nachtjagdgeschwader 1 (Note: According to Scherzer as pilot in the 4./Nachtjagdgeschwader 1.)
  - 196th Oak Leaves on 26 February 1943 as Oberleutnant and pilot in the 3./Nachtjagdgeschwader 1
- Mentioned four times in the Wehrmachtbericht (19 June 1941, 13 March 1942, 27 March 1942 and 23 April 1942)
