= Pyrzany =

- Village
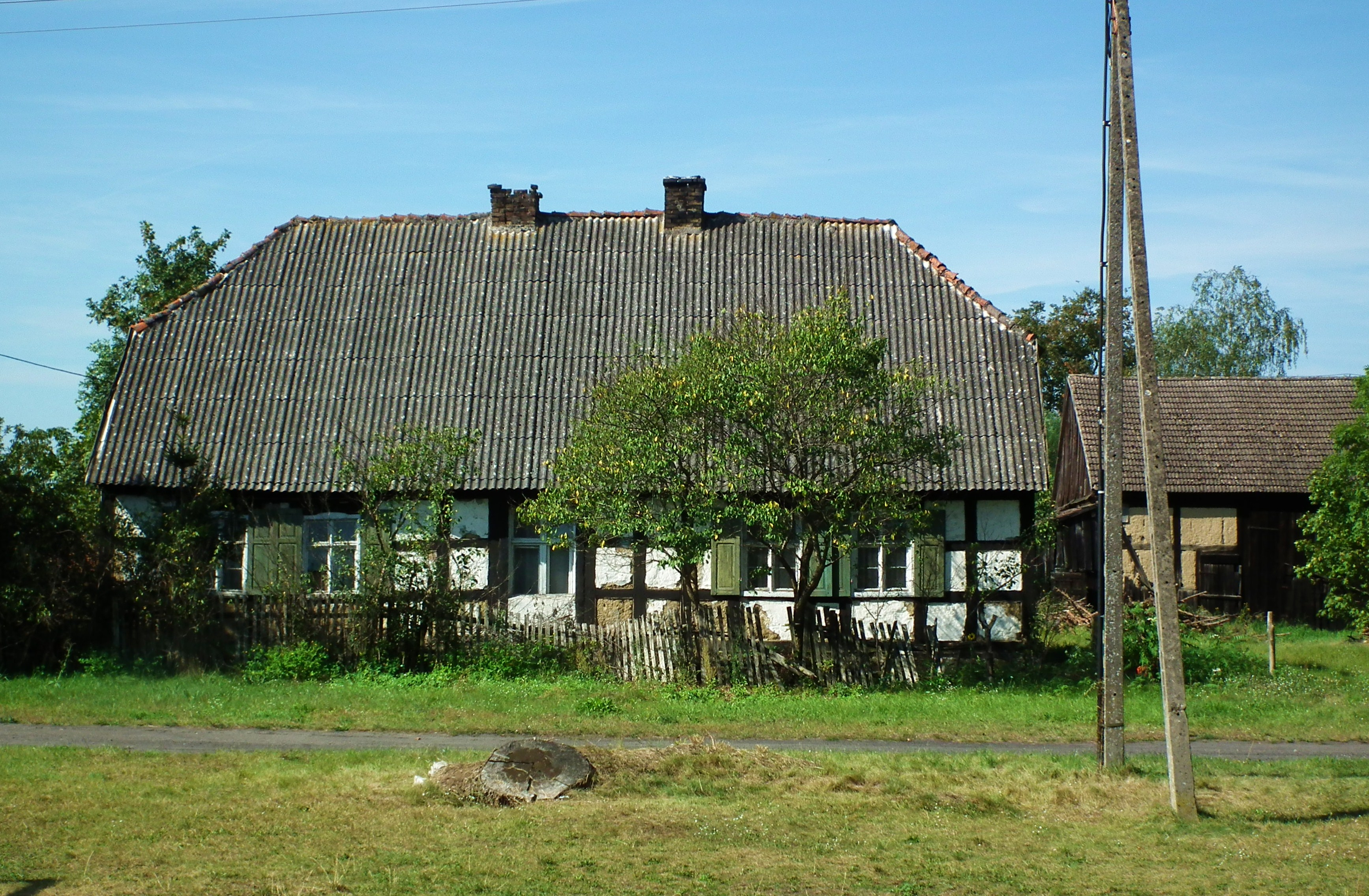

- Location within Poland
- Coordinates: 52°39′N 14°58′E
- Country: Poland
- Voivodeship: Lubusz
- County: Gorzów
- Gmina: Witnica

Pyrzany ([pɨˈʐanɨ]; German: Pyrehne) is a village in the administrative district of Gmina Witnica, within Gorzów County, Lubusz Voivodeship, in western Poland.

== Notable residents ==
- Helmut Lent (1918–1944), German fighter ace
