= Bergen aan Zee =

- Village / seaside resort
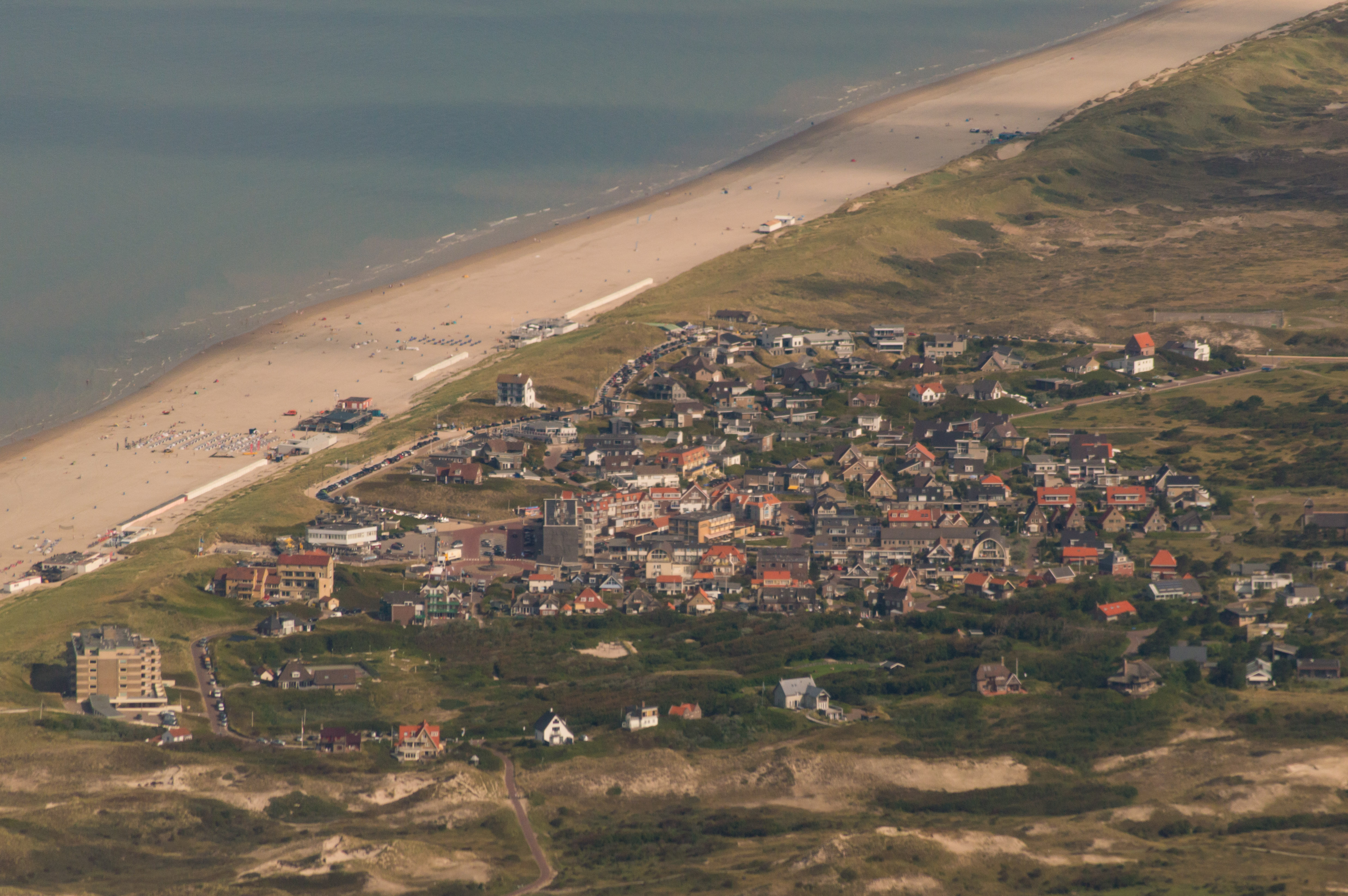
- Aerial photograph of Bergen aan Zee (2015)

- Location in the Netherlands Location in the province of North Holland in the Netherlands
- Coordinates: 52°40′N 4°38′E
- Country: Netherlands
- Province: North Holland
- Municipality: Bergen
- Established: 1906

Area
  - Total: 1.45 km^{2} (0.56 sq mi)
- Elevation: 8 m (26 ft)

Population (2025)
  - Total: 420
  - Density: 290/km^{2} (750/sq mi)
- Time zone: UTC+1 (CET)
  - Summer (DST): UTC+2 (CEST)
- Postal code: 1865
- Dialing code: 072

Bergen aan Zee is a village and seaside resort on the North Sea coast in the Dutch province of North Holland. It is a part of the municipality of Bergen, and lies about 9 km west of Alkmaar.

== History ==
The village was first mentioned in 1848 as Bergen aan Zee, and means Bergen on the sea. It was officially founded in 1906. A new seaside village was built as a result of private investment by large landowners and the mayor of Bergen. Bergen aan Zee has grown into a beach resort town, popular for surfing and sailing. The majority of the visitors come either from the Netherlands or Germany, to enjoy the sandy beach. It is also home to Zee Aquarium Bergen.

Between 1909 and 1955 it was the terminus of a light rail line from Alkmaar to the coast, where the iconic Dutch steam engine "Bello" was one of the locomotives.

== Gallery ==
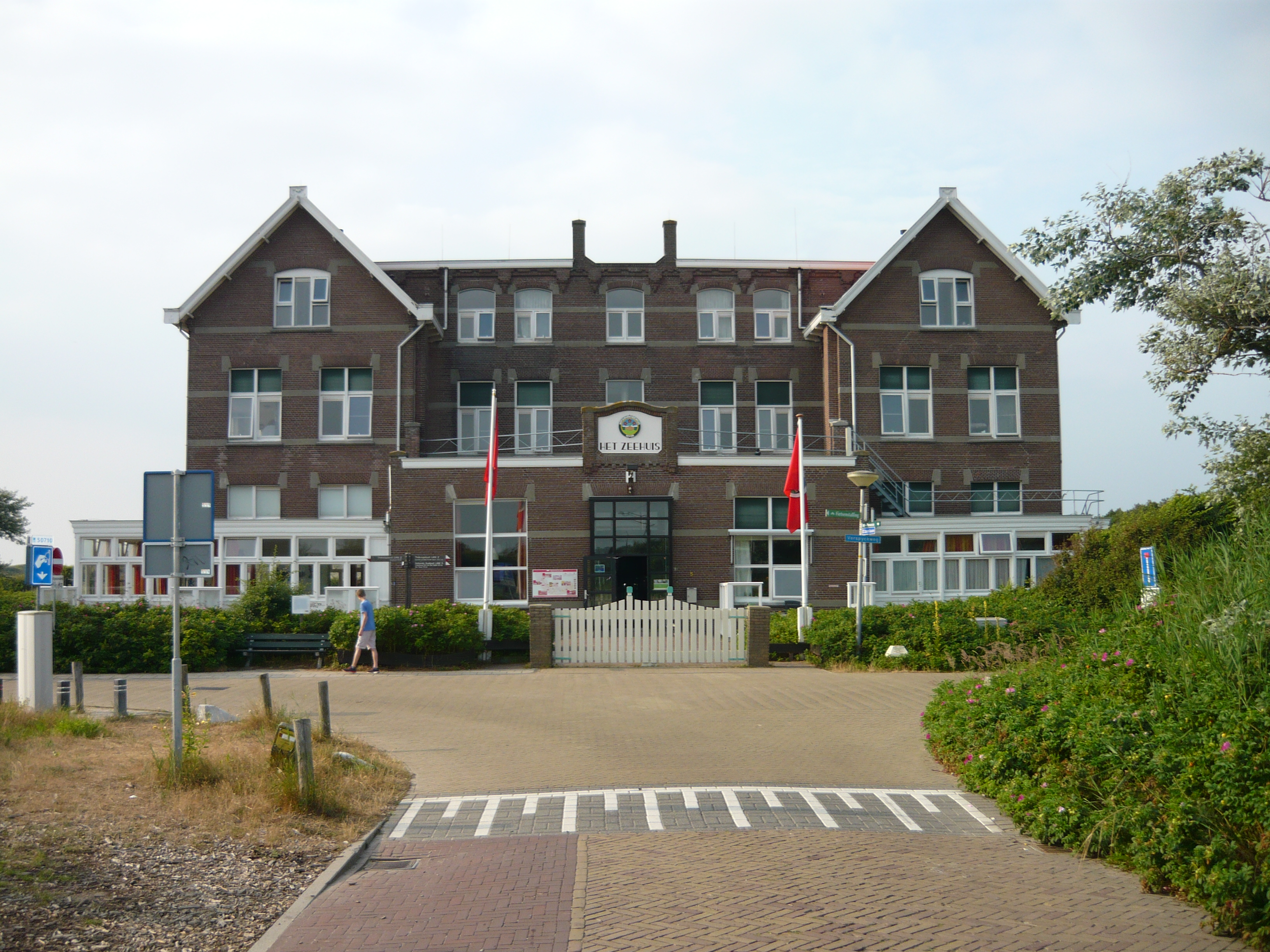
Former children's sanatorium Het Zeehuis

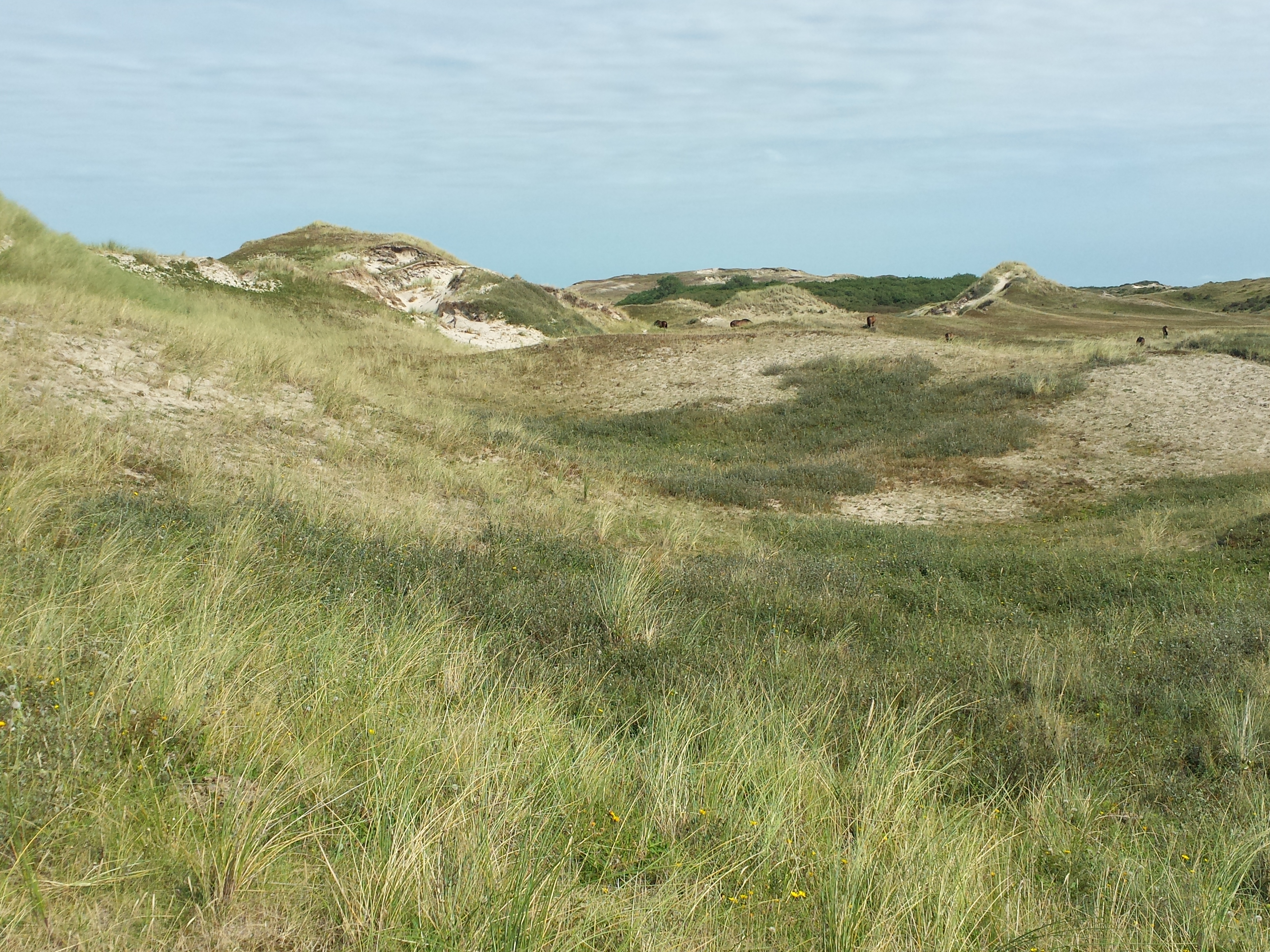
Dunes

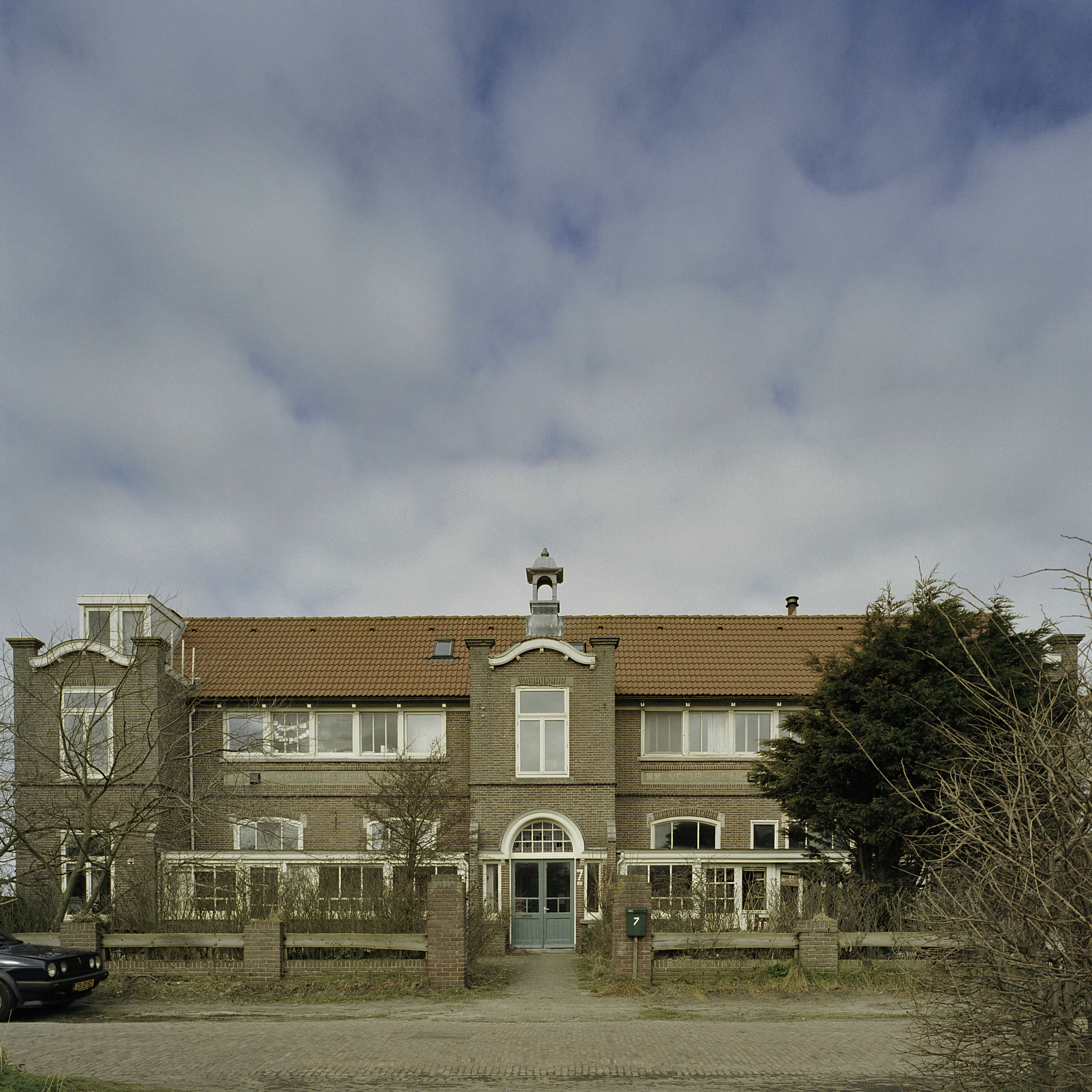
Colony building

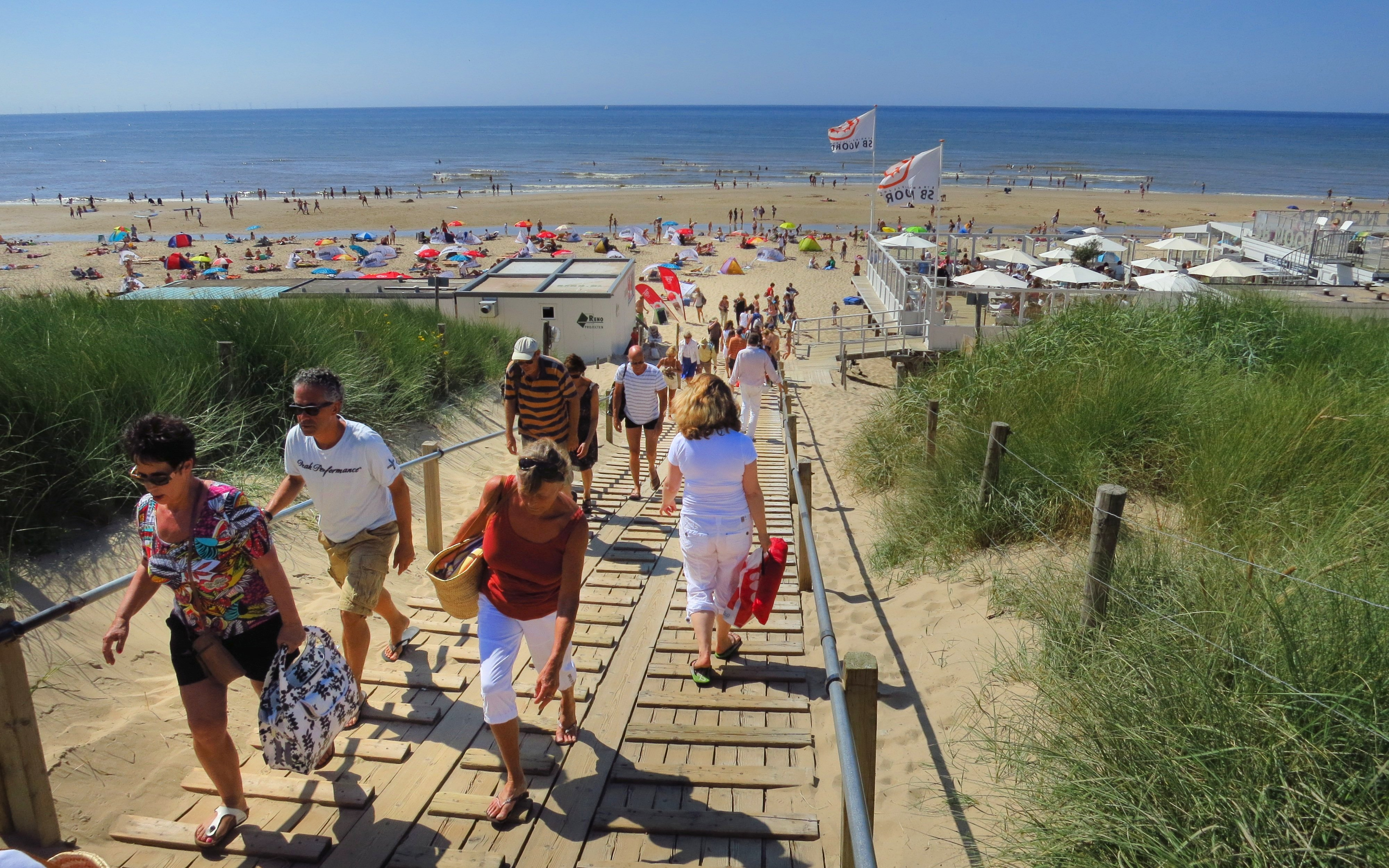
Beach view
