= Wilde Sau =

Tactic of the German Air Force against British night bombers

Wilde Sau (Lit. wild sow; generally known in English as "Wild Boar") was the term given by the Luftwaffe to the tactic used from 1943 to 1944 during World War II by which British night bombers were engaged by single-seat day-fighter aircraft flying in the Defence of the Reich.

It was adopted when the Allies had the advantage over German radar controlled interception. The fighters had to engage the British bombers freely as they were illuminated by searchlight batteries, while avoiding their own anti-aircraft fire. After some initial successes, rising losses and deteriorating weather conditions led to the abandonment of the tactic.

== Background ==
In 1943 Allied bombing raids against the German industry and cities intensified significantly. Strained by fighting on several fronts the Luftwaffe was not able to answer those raids adequately. Mismanagement by the Luftwaffe leadership led to stagnant production of much needed aircraft, and indecision regarding aerial doctrine worsened the situation.

Another blow was the British capture of a Junkers Ju 88 R-1 night fighter (Werknummer 360 043) when its crew defected and flew to Scotland. The aircraft carried the initial B/C form of the UHF-band Lichtenstein radar, so its existence was revealed to the Allies. RAF Bomber Command began to use a new form of "Window" (or chaff), aluminium strips sized to jam the Lichtenstein B/C radar when dropped. This brought about the need to deploy new night-fighting methods that no longer relied solely on aircraft interception (AI) radar radar until the longer wavelength, VHF-band Lichtenstein SN-2 radar could be produced for use in German night fighters. By mid-1943 it became clear that the past approach was not working and a change in the general aerial defensive doctrine was needed. One of those was the introduction of new fighter tactics to counter the increasing Allied bomber threat.

On 27 June 1943, Luftwaffe officer Major Hajo Herrmann proposed an experimental approach to counter Allied night bombing. His proposal, which he had tested in trials secretly, was picked up and expanded by Viktor von Loßberg, by prepared reports from his staff group. Loßberg presented his proposal on 29 July, before the Luftwaffe leadership, Erhard Milch and Hermann Göring. The successful trial runs of the new tactic convinced them and especially Hitler to officially put this doctrine into use.

== Wilde Sau ==
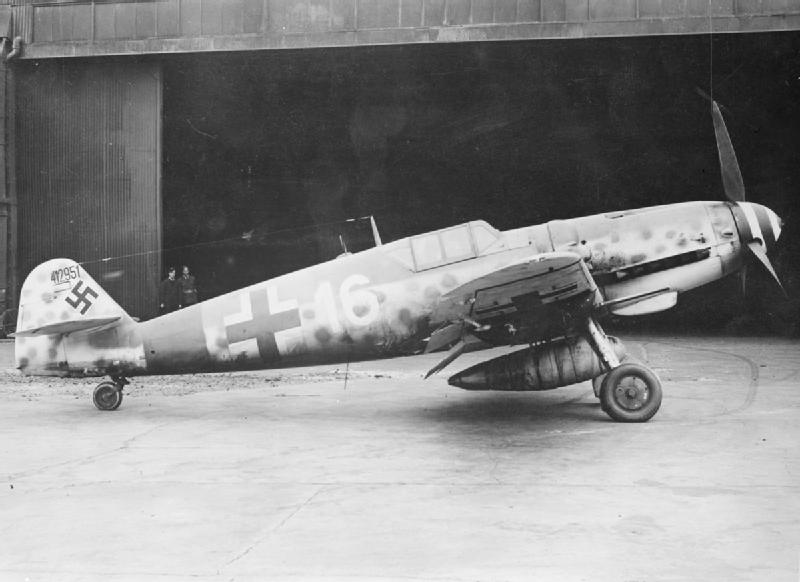
A Messerschmitt Bf 109 of Jagdgeschwader 301. Photographed in British hands after landing by accident at an RAF airfield in July 1944, after a Wilde Sau sortie

The new tactic outlined in Herrmann's report envisaged the use of free-ranging day fighters (and to a lesser extent night fighters) to counter Bomber Command. The single-engined fighters were to supplement the Himmelbett (four-poster bed) ground-controlled interception technique, by co-operation with searchlight crews, mostly over the target. Pyrotechnic and other visual means were to guide the fighters in operations known as Wilde Sau (Wild Boar). After the fighters had reached the combat zone, pilots tried to identify and intercept enemy bombers visually; searchlights were to be used to illuminate the sky. Initial tests using former flying instructors experienced in blind-flying techniques, suggested the ideal weather conditions were when a certain (not too thick) lower level cloud cover prevailed, since then the bomber would be silhouetted against the back-lit clouds and the high-flying German fighters could easily spot their targets.

During trials, ceasefires with the German flak units were arranged to prevent friendly fire, but it became apparent that co-ordination of ceasefires with Wilde Sau operations was difficult. To remove this threat from their own flak, the fighters were limited to certain altitudes, so the German flak could avoid firing on them. Another problem was navigation. As night-flying aids in a day fighter were rudimentary, an elaborate system of visual aids to navigation had to be established, encompassing light beacons, searchlight patterns, flak guns firing combinations of various tracer colours through the clouds and parachute flares. To make up for the lack of visual aids initially, converted bomber pilots had to be used, because they already had experience with navigating at night. Another navigation aid was simply the Allied bombing target; a city illuminated as it burned would guide the fighters to their target.

== Battle ==
The week-long Battle of Hamburg in July 1943 proved disastrous for the Luftwaffe, when the first use of Window by Bomber Command knocked out the Himmelbett radar defence system. Window jammed the GCI system, airborne radar sets, gun-laying radar and searchlight controls and British losses to Flak and night-fighters declined. The raids were aided by fortunate weather conditions resulting in a firestorm. As a result, every other promising measure of preventing such a recurrence was considered and Hermann's proposal was put into effect. His original experimental unit was rapidly expanded into Jagdgeschwader 300. Jagdgeschwader 301 and Jagdgeschwader 302 were also raised to use the Wilde Sau tactic under the new Fighter Division 30 (30. Jagddivision), which was commanded by Herrmann.

On the night of 3/4 July 1943, 653 Bomber Command aircraft attacked Cologne and the Wilde Sau squadrons took part in the defense of the city. The Luftwaffe shot down thirty British aircraft, of which twelve were shot down by Wilde Sau units. Anti-aircraft batteries restricted the height of their flak and the fighters operated above that ceiling. After this success and Loßberg's influential report, the use of the Wilde Sau tactic was increased and together with the Zahme Sau tactic generally integrated in a new German aerial defense approach. They were part of a wider reformation of the German aerial defense and armament industry in the summer of 1943. These measures accelerated the abandonment of the Kammhuber Himmelbett system and paved the way for a more flexible approach. Those reforms were initially successful, as fighter victories increased and industrial production rose.

During the next air battles in summer to fall 1943, the Germans were able to deal some blows to the British bombing force with the aid of the new tactic. During the bombing raids on Berlin (a deception attack) and Operation Hydra on the Peenemünde research facilities on the night of 17/18 August, 64 bombers were shot down. In another raid on the night of 23/24 August, 56 bombers were shot down, representing 8 percent of the attacking force. Those battles also saw the first operational implementation of Schräge Musik, which was two fuselage-mounted autocannon of at least 20 mm calibre, which allowed German Nachtjagdflieger night fighter pilots to shoot upwards from their aircraft.

The success continued and the new tactics were improved while German night fighters were able to inflict many losses on the British during the next period in fall to winter 1943. British bombing losses were as high as up to 8 percent per sortie. In December alone the British lost 316 bombers. British losses were amplified due their persistence in the Battle of Berlin; despite the improved German air defenses, the British continued their campaign.

== Aftermath ==
=== Analysis ===
The success of Wilde Sau was short-lived and proved to be very costly to the 100 fighters of Fighter Division 30. The tactic provided a stop-gap and more Allied bombers were shot down but German losses also rose. The Luftwaffe was not able to replace losses and due to a high attrition rate, fighter readiness dwindled. The dual use of day fighters for Wilde Sau night-fighter operations amplified this effect and the resulting erratic maintenance schedules led to serviceability rates dropping drastically. With the onset of poorer weather in the autumn of 1943, wastage through accidents and icing soared and German pilots could not implement Wilde Sau as effectively as before. Wilde Sau was discontinued in spring 1944 but had tided over the Luftwaffe air defences until new radar equipment immune to Window/Düppel had been developed.

=== Zahme Sau ===
Simultaneous with Wilde Sau, Zahme Sau (Tame Boar) was introduced, in which the twin-engined night fighters in to the Himmelbett system using individual ground-controlled interception were released. The fighters flew against the bomber stream in a co-ordinated operation over a wide area, guided by a running commentary derived from radar, ground observation, wireless interception and contact reports from aircraft tracking the bomber stream. Audio and visual beacons were used to assemble the fighters, which circled the beacons until the target was identified and then intercepted the bombers, at a height beyond the range of flak fire.

== See also ==
- List of World War II electronic warfare equipment: Tactics
- Battle of the Beams
- Defense of the Reich

== Bibliography ==
- Armstrong, Craig (2021). RAF Bomber Command at War 1939-1945. Pen & Sword. ISBN 978-1-5267-0054-4.
- Boog, Horst; Krebs, Gerhard; Vogel, Detlef (2001). Das Deutsche Reich in der Defensive Strategischer Luftkrieg in Europa, Krieg im Westen und in Ostasien 1943 bis 1944/45 [The Strategic Air War in Europe and the War in the West and East Asia 1943–1944/5]. Germany and the Second World War (in German). Vol. VII. Militärgeschichtliches Forschungsamt. Deutsche Verlags-Anstalt. ISBN 978-0-19-822889-9.
- O'Connell, John (2007). The Effectiveness of Airpower in the 20th Century. New York: iUniverse. ISBN 978-0-595-45724-3.
- Murray, Williamson (1983). Strategy for Defeat: The Luftwaffe 1933–1945. Maxwell Air Force Base, Alabama: Air University Press. ISBN 978-0-16-002160-2. OCLC 8846379.
- The Rise and Fall of the German Air Force. Public Record Office War Histories. Air 41/10 (repr. HMSO ed.). Richmond, Surrey: Air Ministry. 2001 [1948]. ISBN 978-1-903365-30-4.
