= Defence of the Reich =

1939–45 aerial campaign of World War II

- Part of European theatre of World War II
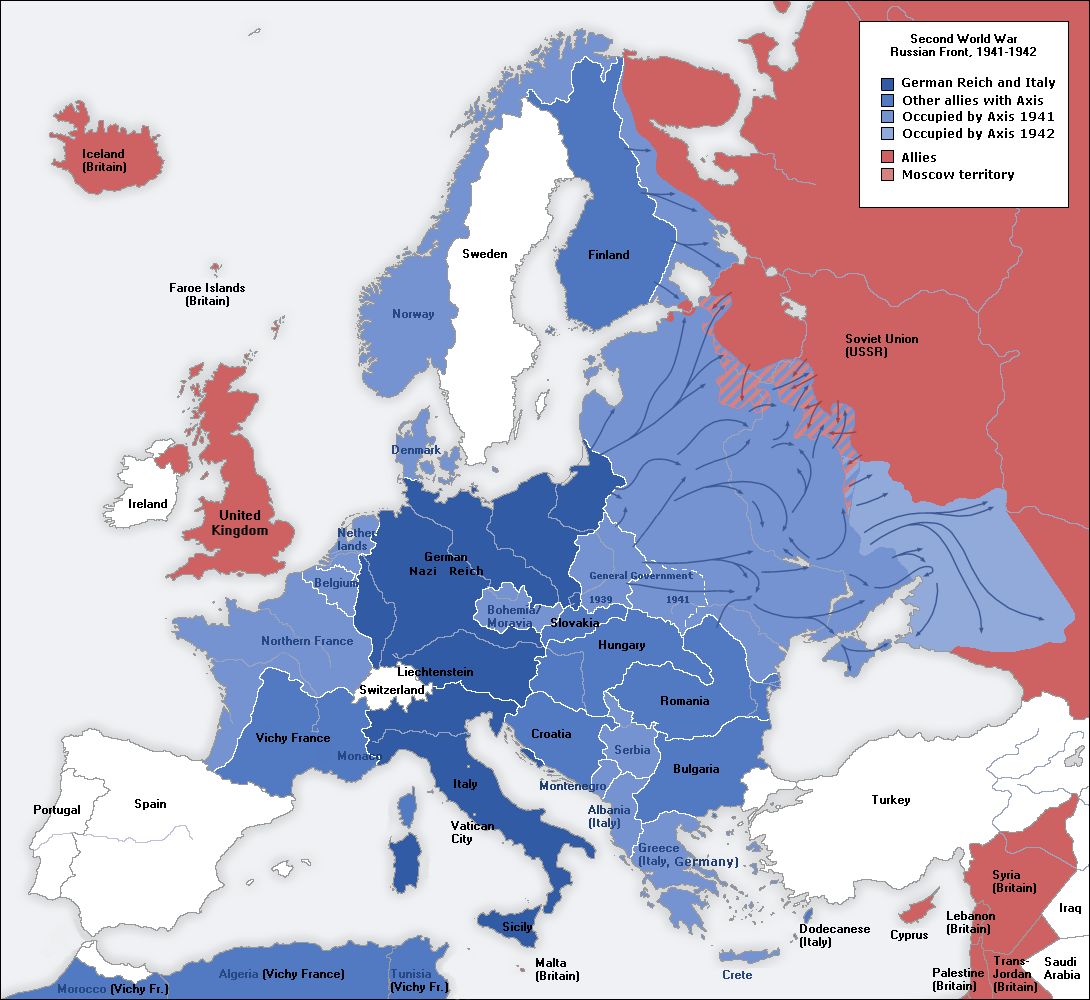
- Scope of the Defence of the Reich campaign. (Note: By July 1944, the scope of the Defence of the Reich campaign included: Germany, East Prussia, Austria, Czechoslovakia, Denmark, Netherlands, Belgium, France, Poland, Hungary and Lithuania.)
Date	4 September 1939 – 8 May 1945 (5 years, 8 months and 4 days)
Location	German-occupied Europe
Result	Allied victory

Belligerents
Allies: United Kingdom; United States (Note: from 1942); Canada; Soviet Union (Note: from 1941); France (Note: Third Republic in 1940; Provisional Government from 1944); Free France (Note: 1940–1944); Poland; Belgium (Note: from 1940); Netherlands; Norway; Czechoslovakia	Axis: Germany; Italy (Note: 1940–1943); Romania (Note: 1941–1944); Hungary; Slovakia

Commanders and leaders
(United Kingdom) Arthur Harris (United Kingdom) Trafford Leigh-Mallory (United Kingdom) Arthur Tedder (United Kingdom) Charles Portal (United States) Carl Spaatz (United States) James H. Doolittle (United States) Ira C. Eaker (Soviet Union) Alexander Novikov	(Nazi Germany) Hermann Göring (Nazi Germany) Hans Jeschonnek (Nazi Germany) Hans-Jürgen Stumpff (Nazi Germany) Josef Kammhuber (Nazi Germany) Hugo Sperrle

Strength
	Ground-based, mid-1944: Personnel: 1,110,900 2,655 heavy flak gun batteries: 10,930 88 mm Flak 18/36 and Flak 37 guns; 4,157 105 mm Flak 38/39 and 128 mm Flak 40 guns; 1,612 light flak gun batteries: 30,463 20 mm Flak 30/38 and 37 mm Flak 43 guns

Casualties and losses
40,000 aircraft destroyed: 22,000 RAF Bomber Command aircraft; 18,000 American aircraft; 79,281 RAF Bomber Command personnel 79,265 American airmen	57,405 aircraft destroyed 97 submarines destroyed 7,400+ 88mm artillery pieces lost (1942–1944) (Note: "Throughout 1944, the flak lost an average of 380 88 mm flak guns per month as a result of excessive wear or destruction, a rate of consumption twice that of 1943 and nine times greater than in 1942.") at least 23,000 motor vehicles destroyed At least 700–800 tanks 500,000 civilians killed 23,000 military and police killed at least 450 locomotives (1943 only) at least 4,500 passenger wagons (1943 only) at least 6,500 goods wagons (1943 only)

The Defence of the Reich (German: Reichsverteidigung) was the strategic defensive aerial campaign fought by the Luftwaffe of Nazi Germany over German-occupied Europe and Germany during World War II against the Allied strategic bombing campaign. Its aim was to prevent the destruction of German civilians, military and civil industries by the Western Allies. The day and night air battles over Germany during the war involved thousands of aircraft, units and aerial engagements to counter the Allied bombing campaigns. The campaign was one of the longest in the history of aerial warfare, running through the entirety of the war in Europe alongside the concurrent Battle of the Atlantic and naval blockade of Germany. The Luftwaffe fighter force defended the airspace of German-occupied Europe against attack, first by the RAF Bomber Command and then against the RAF and United States Army Air Forces (USAAF) in the Combined Bomber Offensive.

In the early years, the Luftwaffe was able to inflict a string of defeats on Allied strategic air forces. In 1939, Bomber Command was forced to operate at night, due to the extent of losses of unescorted bombers flying in daylight. In 1943, the USAAF suffered several reverses in daylight and called off the offensive over Germany in October limiting their attacks to western Europe as they built up their force. During the war the British built up their bomber force, introducing better aircraft with navigational aids and tactics such as the bomber stream that enabled them to mount larger and larger attacks while remaining within an acceptable loss rate. In 1944 the USAAF introduced metal drop tanks for all American fighters including the newly arrived North American P-51D Mustang variant, which allowed fighter aircraft to escort USAAF bombers all the way to and from their targets. With a change of focus on destroying the German day fighter force, by the spring of 1944 the Eighth Air Force had achieved air supremacy over Western Europe, which was essential for the Allies so they could carry out the invasion of France. The strategic campaign against Germany eased as the Allies' Transport Plan focused their resources on isolating northern France in preparation for the invasion.

American strategic bombing raids in June and July 1944 seriously damaged 24 synthetic oil plants and 69 refineries, which halted 98 per cent of German aviation fuel plants and dropped monthly synthetic oil production to 51,000 tons. After these attacks, recovery efforts in the following month could only bring back 65 per cent of aviation fuel production temporarily. In the first quarter of 1944, Nazi Germany produced 546,000 tons of aviation fuel, with 503,000 tons coming from synthetic fuel by hydrogenation. Aviation fuel stock reserves dropped to 70 per cent in April 1944, to 370,000 tons in June 1944, and to 175,000 tons in November. The oil campaign of World War II led to chronic fuel shortages, severe curtailment of flying training and accelerated deterioration in pilot quality, eroding the Luftwaffe's fighting capacity in the last months. By the end of the campaign, American forces claimed to have destroyed 35,783 enemy aircraft and the RAF claimed 21,622, for a total of 57,405 German aircraft claimed destroyed. (Note: Breakdown as follows: European Theater of Operations, air: 13,623, ground: 6,796; Mediterranean Theater of Operations (Italy and North Africa), air: 7,003, ground: 2,494, and 5,867 probable.)

The USAAF dropped 1.46 million tons of bombs on Axis-occupied Europe while the RAF dropped 1.31 million tons, for a total of 2.77 million tons, of which 51.1 per cent was dropped on Germany. With the direct damage inflicted on German industry and air force, the Wehrmacht was forced to use millions of men, tens of thousands of guns and hundreds of millions of shells in a failed attempt to halt the Allied bomber offensive. (Note: "By the autumn of 1944, the ground-based air defense force numbered 1,110,900 persons with 448,700, or 40 percent, of these persons coming from outside the Luftwaffe. The non-Luftwaffe personnel included 220,000 Home Guard, Labor Service, and male high school auxiliaries, 128,000 female auxiliaries, and 98,000 foreign volunteers and prisoners of war.") (Note: "In August 1940, the Luftwaffe's flak arm had included 791 heavy flak gun batteries, 686 light flak gun batteries, and 221 searchlight batteries operated by a total of 528,000 regular and reserve Luftwaffe personnel. Four years later, the size of the flak arm had increased to 2,655 heavy flak gun batteries, 1,612 light flak gun batteries, and 470 searchlight batteries.") The Luftwaffe's losses in this theater also sapped an enormous amount of Germany's overall war-making potential: aircraft accounted for some 40% of German military expenditures (by Reichsmark value) from 1942 to 1944.

From January 1942 to April 1943, the German arms industry grew by an average of 5.5 per cent per month but by summer 1943, the systematic attack against German industry by Allied bombers brought the increase in armaments production from May 1943 to March 1944 to a halt. At the ministerial meeting in January 1945, Albert Speer noted that, since the intensification of the bombing began, 35 per cent fewer tanks, 31 per cent fewer aircraft and 42 per cent fewer lorries were produced than planned because of the bombing. The German economy had to switch a vast amount of resources away from equipment for the fighting fronts and assign them instead to combat the bombing threat. The intensification of night bombing by the RAF and daylight attacks by the USAAF added to the destruction of a major part of German industries and cities, which caused the Nazi economy to collapse in the winter of 1944–45. By this time, the Allied armies had reached the German border and the strategic campaign became fused with the tactical battles over the front. The air campaign continued into April 1945, when the last strategic bombing missions were flown, and it ended upon the German unconditional surrender on 9 May.

== German defensive strategy ==
The Luftwaffe lacked an effective air defence system early in the war. Allied daylight actions over German controlled territory were sparse in 1939–1940. The responsibility of the defence of German air space fell to the Luftgaukommandos (air district commands), which controlled the anti-aircraft artillery (AAA), the civilian Aircraft Warning Service, and fighter forces assigned to air defence duties. The defences were directed by the Luftverteidigungskommando ("Air Defence Command") and its coordination and communication did not always work out smoothly in practice. The lack of common understanding between liaison officers from the AAA and flying branches plagued the strategic defensive aerial campaign throughout the war.

Adolf Hitler, in particular, wanted the defence to rest on anti-aircraft guns as it gave the civilian population a "psychological crutch" no matter how ineffective the weapons. However, there were larger problems with the air defence system in the fall of 1939. LVZ West (Luftverteidigungszone West) often drew forces away from participating in the Luftgaukommandos, which were assigned to protect specific objectives in its homeland defence. Had the Allies launched a large scale air offensive against the Ruhr region, it would have been particularly difficult to defend against Allied raids during that time, as the Luftgaukommandos would have lacked an effective force in interception of enemy aircraft. The air defences remained ineffective and unchallenged in the years 1939 to 1942, because Allied air forces were too weak to take advantage, which ensured that this danger remained hypothetical. Only seven Gruppen covered German air space, with the critical industries not well protected.

On 21 September 1939, Hans Jeschonnek, the Luftwaffe's Chief of Staff, clarified the role of the day fighter force in the defence of German territory. Fighter units earmarked for specific defensive tasks would remain under local air-defence command. However, all other fighter units would be organised under one of several Luftflotten (Air Fleets), which would prosecute the defence of German targets in a manner "linked directly with the strategic concept for the continued conduct of the air war". In other words, the Luftwaffe fighter force would act as both a defensive and offensive force, maintaining air superiority over enemy air space would prevent enemy attacks on German-held territory. This kind of strategy worked well at the front, but it soon became clear that a lack of training, experience and coordination between the Fliegerdivisions (Flying Divisions) and the AAA arm, when dealing with strategic defensive operations, made the conduct of combined arms operations difficult.

Most of the air battles fought through May 1941 by the Luftwaffe on the Western Front were against the RAF's "Circus" raids and the occasional daylight raid into German air space. This was an unfortunate position since the Luftwaffe's strategy of focusing its striking power on one front started to unravel with the failure of Operation Barbarossa, the invasion of the Soviet Union. The "peripheral" strategy of the Luftwaffe, advocated by Jeschonnek, had been to deploy its fighter defences at the edges of Axis occupied territory, with little protecting the inner depths.

== German weaknesses ==
Although the Luftwaffe eventually allocated more resources to the coming campaign than the RAF did during the Battle of Britain in 1940, it failed to commit these resources at a time when the Allied air offensive might have been checked. The Luftwaffe's key mistakes in leadership, production and training decisions that eventually cost it the campaign were made in 1940–1942. The German leadership failed to develop a coherent air strategy for a long war. Strategic blindness, operational effectiveness and missteps paired with a failure to assign air defence as a top priority undermined the Luftwaffe's efforts in 1943–1945. German strategy, termed the cult of the offensive, worked in 1939–41, but when faced with a war of attrition, the growing power of its enemies, its forces spread thinly over four fronts, the failure to develop defensive doctrines, tactics and plans led to defeat.

=== Organisation and planning ===
The Jagdwaffe defences of Germany were not considered a part of the offensive air effort. The German strategy was of focusing on offensive aviation to achieve superiority on the battlefronts, and the home front force was considered second-rate and unimportant. It did not receive the investment it needed and was too weak in respect of other Luftwaffe arms for proper expansion after the start of hostilities. As a consequence, the force had no representation in the High Command. The organisation remained split under different Air Fleets and was not put under a unified command. When the need for some sort of air defence was recognised before the outbreak of war, the rush to build the Jagdwaffe was so fast that quality in cohesion and organisation suffered. The expansion, when it did come, came too late. Only nine Jagdgeschwader were in existence in 1939, and no new Geschwader (Wings) were created until 1942. The years 1940 and 1941 were wasted. Only eight were created for defence duties, and the force increased in size by only one-third. The growth of the force and its concepts owed much to the activity of its enemies. The planning of defence was always reactive.

=== Developments and equipment ===
No tactical-technical section existed in either the RLM or Oberkommando der Luftwaffe (OKL), with a near-complete lack of any system for a direct manner for combat pilots to place field requests for improvements to existing weapons systems, and to address improved tactics for their use. The Luftwaffe was therefore unable to provide appropriate equipment for the task asked of its units. Starting in 1940, all planning was short-sighted as a matter of policy. The need for technical improvements was resisted as pushing through upgrades would have reduced production rates of standard aircraft. Hardware would have to be turned over to the production of new types, causing a drop in output. This meant obsolete sub-variant or main types were kept in production too long. The OKL failed to produce adequate numbers of aircraft and refused to cut bomber production in favour of fighters until mid-1944. Even when these events were corrected, procurement was poor. As one key example late in the war, the Messerschmitt Me 262 was unable to be introduced rapidly enough. Partly through the pioneering nature of its axial-flow jet engines, the first ever placed in production, requiring much development time to make them reliable enough for front-line use, and too much time was wasted between operational testing, tactical-doctrinal development and training. General der Jagdflieger (General of Fighters) Adolf Galland took responsibility for this failure.

=== Pilot selection and training ===
One of the most damaging elements of this aspect was the Luftwaffe's intent on giving preference to the bomber arm when it came to highly trained personnel. Flight schools were more interested in turning out bomber pilots than fighter pilots. The organisation lacked a sufficient supply of commissioned pilots of fighter forces. This neglect meant a lack of combat leaders later in the war. Galland himself noted that pilot training for trainees was too limited in flying hours received. Too little training was received on operational types, formation flying, gunnery training, combat training, and there was a complete lack of instrument training. Galland asserted that the lack of instrument training had not been corrected until late in the war.

=== Staff training ===
Staff training was uneven and neglected. Systematic training of formation leaders was not begun until after 1943. It created a lack of trained and experienced flight leaders in 1943–1945. This was far too late to help in the Defence of the Reich campaign. The trained and experienced leaders that did exist were replaced in 1940 by younger and less experienced leaders too quickly (owing to Göring's frustration with them during the Battle of Britain). Later, Göring did the same thing with Fighter Division, the Jafu Jagdfliegerführer and Jagddivision commanders. The high turnover in the division made gaining experience impossible. Making matters worse, there were no fighter command organisations at the start of the war and there were never enough good officers to staff those that were set up. The Luftwaffe had very few General Staff Officers.

Most Luftwaffe leaders were born well before the First World War and the army preferred officer candidates from the Real Gymnasien high school, that emphasized sciences and modern languages. However, because of the social and political situation, they looked for candidates from the Humanistische Gymnasien, a high school enrolled with sons of families of the higher classes, of the bourgeoisie and aristocracy, and which stood against the egalitarian and democratic ideas of the lower, more technical-minded worker and craftsmen. The Humanistische Gymnasien produced graduates with a classical and all-round education, that was less focused on specialisation and technology. However, many of those graduates from the Humanistische Gymnasien eventually became famous scientists. 75 percent of the later Luftwaffe generals came from upper middle class officer families, and only 17 percent of the generals' fathers had technical professions. About 5 percent of Luftwaffe generals and general staff officers obtained technical degrees during their academic training. Most of these officers could not familiarise themselves with higher technology, because Germany was not allowed to have aircraft and heavy weapons during the time of the Weimar Republic.

=== Strategy and tactics ===
The Luftwaffe's key mistakes meant that the Jagdwaffe was overloaded with missions after 1942. At no point was the Jagdwaffe allowed to take the offensive to try to regain air superiority, and tactics were always defensive or reactive. The successive draining of resources from the Defence of the Reich to the Eastern Front went on for too long which hampered an early build-up of RLV forces. It was slow and piecemeal and lacked any formal planning. The OKL damaged the fighting efficiency of fighter groups by transferring them away from their Geschwader command. The ground organization and communications networks were neglected when moving units causing confusion and reducing operational readiness.

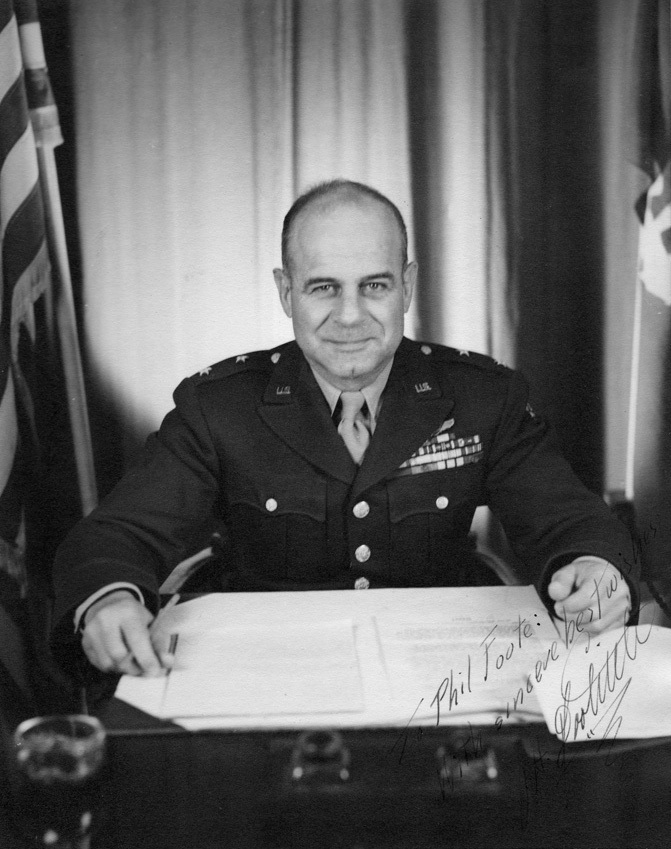
Maj. Gen. Jimmy Doolittle's fighter tactics against the Luftwaffe fatally disabled its bomber destroyer forces from early 1944 onwards

Bad weather operations completely overtaxed fighter units and inflicted high losses which caused a drop in morale and confidence in the High Command. The OKL itself did not understand the need for economical employment of strength with respect to the RLV. All raids were met at full strength, rapidly wearing down the defenders. Contributing to the wearing down of fighter units was the overly-long use of vulnerable, twin-engined Zerstörer heavy fighters, like the Messerschmitt Bf 110 (increasingly used, by this time, as radar-equipped night fighters) and the daylight-only Messerschmitt Me 410 Hornisse, insisted upon by Hitler and Göring. Göring permitted no realistic reflection on the loss of air superiority, but squandered time and energy in the disparagement of the Jagdwaffe. Both Zerstörer types had to be withdrawn from daylight combat by the spring of 1944 due to losses. The USAAF's new commander of the Eighth Air Force, Major General Jimmy Doolittle, changed fighter tactics as 1944 began, devastated the Luftwaffe's day fighter defences for the rest of the war over Germany and achieved near-complete air supremacy for the Allies by the time Operation Overlord was launched in early June 1944.

Giving control of IX. Fliegerkorps to the bomber arm had a disastrous impact. They were not qualified to conduct offensive operations and to lead fighter formations. Dissolution and heavy losses were the results. During the course of the conflict, the OKL never understood the importance of time, the need to rest, plan and recover to prolong defensive operations. Continuously keeping units on the frontline needlessly wore them out.

Another contributory factor was the lack of attention paid to Galland's basic rules of combat. In the tactical battle, he argued that the fighter must fight on the offensive, even when on defensive missions. There was no place for a defensive posture. An example of this dictum being ignored was the instance of having Messerschmitt Bf 109 groups escort vulnerable and heavily armed Focke-Wulf Fw 190s which had replaced the vulnerable Zerstörer twin-engined fighters, which reduced the power of interception formations. Combat cohesion was frequently disregarded, and the integrity of the formations became compromised and ignored (owing to a lack of experienced leaders). Fixed tactical schemata contributed to failures as well. Rigid tactics were allowed to take root and technique suffered. Using surprise, cunning and manoeuvrability had to be combined with aggressiveness and improvisation depending on the situation. This sort of tactical advantage was gradually lost.

=== German production failures ===
German aircraft production difficulties in equipping and expanding the air force arose since the mobilization in 1936. Production in the 5 years of rearmament for more combat aircraft began to rise sharply in the plans for a long-term air-force expansion, while the general aircraft production output worsened faster and by a greater margin. During the period from 1936 to 1938 actual aircraft production plans remained unchanged or went into reverse. By 1939, only 33% of the production totals set in August 1938 had been reached.

Erhard Milch's aircraft production program, the so-called "Göring program", had largely been predicated on the defeat of the Soviet Union in 1941. After the Wehrmacht's failure at the Battle of Moscow, industrial priorities for increasing aircraft production were largely abandoned to support the army's increased attrition rates and heavy equipment losses. Milch's later reforms expanded production rates. In 1941, an average of 981 aircraft (including 311 fighters) were produced monthly. In 1942, this rose to 1,296 aircraft, of which 434 were fighters. However, increases were complicated by the army and navy's demands for production resources. Milch informed Göring that the aviation industry was allocated 74% of all aluminum resources, but 5,116 short tons (4,641 t) went into production for ammunition such as shell cases for artillery units. Milch considered this a mistake. He pointed out that these supplies could have built 1,000 Dornier Do 217 heavy bombers and 4,000 Messerschmitt Bf 109s. Milch ordered a crack down on wasteful practices. He ordered metals to be recycled, and metals from crashed aircraft to be used again. This way he increased the availability of metals by 57%. In spite of the failures of the High Command and Göring, the Luftwaffe's resourceful administrators just managed to stabilize German aircraft numbers.

Hans Jeschonnek initially opposed Milch's planned production increases. But in June, he changed his mind and suggested 900 fighters per month should be the average output. The Luftwaffe's operational fighter force had recovered from a low of 39% availability (44% for fighters and 31% for bombers) in the winter of 1941–1942, to 69% by late June (75% for fighters and 66% for bombers) in 1942. However, after increased commitments in the east, overall operational ready rates fluctuated between 59% and 65% for the remaining year. However, throughout 1942, the Luftwaffe was out-produced by 250% in fighter aircraft and by 196% in twin-engine aircraft.

The intensification of Allied bombing caused Germany to disperse production and prevented an efficient acceleration of Milch's expansion program. German aviation production reached about 36,000 aircraft in 1944. However, by the time this was achieved the Luftwaffe lacked the fuel and trained pilots to make this achievement worthwhile. The failure to maximize production immediately after the failures in the Soviet Union and North Africa ensured the Luftwaffe's effective defeat in the period of September 1943 – February 1944. Despite the tactical victories won, they failed to achieve a decisive victory. By the time production reached acceptable levels, it was too little too late.

== Repelling RAF Bomber Command (1939–1941) ==
=== Daylight operations ===
The RAF developed a doctrine of industrial air bombardment in the years leading to the Second World War. RAF strategists deemed the attacks on large areas of industrial cities were the best that could be achieved due to a lack of accuracy in bombing technology. This doctrine was also a result of the then C-in-C Bomber Command, Air Marshal Charles Portal's conviction that attacking German morale would be a key method of forcing capitulation. Portal presented a convincing argument that "morale bombing" would complement strategic bombing as it would target German industrial workers, either undermining their morale or killing them, thus crippling German military industry. This belief stemmed from the policy of Hugh Trenchard, the first Chief of the Air Staff, of carrying the offensive war to the enemy homeland, a policy which originated during the First World War. It was hoped that such physical and psychological damage would be done, in Germany and German-occupied territories, that the people would take up arms and overthrow the system. Despite this ambitious strategy, the RAF had entered the Second World War without a bomber fleet that was fit for the purpose of large-scale strategic bombing. All unescorted bombers were vulnerable in daylight to fighter aircraft. From September 1939 – May 1940, both sides avoided civilian targets. In the case of Bomber Command, dropping leaflets was the main task.

The longest defensive air campaign of the Second World War began on the afternoon of 4 September 1939, just one day after Britain's declaration of war on Germany. The target for RAF Bomber Command was the German naval base at Wilhelmshaven. These raids continued into December 1939. In the aerial engagement dubbed the Battle of the Heligoland Bight on 18 December 1939, the RAF lost 12 of 22 bombers. The German units involved claimed 38 Vickers Wellington medium bombers for a loss of only 3 German fighters, and the British claimed 12 German fighters destroyed and another dozen severely damaged. Bomber Command had been forced to admit defeat in the opening days of the war, and switched to night bombing.

British strategists argued over the nature of British strategy in the 1939–1941 period, the essence of which formed the fundamental base of RAF strategy throughout the war. Bombing results were also wrangled over and formed the key to the issue. Some in the Air Ministry argued that the bombing technology was not accurate and as a result of this precision attacks could not be undertaken. To support their findings, they used the Butt report, which indicated only 30% of RAF bombers arrived within the target area, and just 10% within the Ruhr region. Those in RAF Bomber Command who were in favour of precision bombing of selected targets criticised the report as "selective". When Air Marshal Arthur Harris took over RAF Bomber Command in 1942, he was to use this as a tool to push for his area bombing policies.

=== Night operations ===
Josef Kammhuber recruited pilots Hermann Diehl and Wolfgang Falck to his command. They were important figures in developing the night fighter system. Using Freya radar, they could bring interceptors within 500 m (550 yd) of enemy aircraft. Diehl had helped develop radar controlled defences for daylight operations which were used at the Battle of the Heliogoland Bight in December 1939. Falck used two Würzburg radar sets during night operations in April 1940 and both recommended a command and control system using these technologies. Falck himself developed Helle Nachtjagd ("bright night-fighting"). It involved Würzburg-controlled searchlights supported by 12 purpose-built nightfighters. This concept was limited, as searchlights could not operate effectively in cloud cover more than 5/10.

Although Kammhuber was skeptical about radar, he established Kombinierte Nachtjagdgebiete ("combined night fighting zones") around prime targets in which fighters cooperated with Würzburg sets supported by AAA. Although not successful at first, results soon improved. It was halted around October 1940, as a lack of long-range radar made it an unsuitable method. A second system, suggested by Diehl, involved a Freya married to a searchlight (Parasitanlage, "parasite installation"). It was designated Dunkle Nachtjagd ("dark night fighting"). It proved difficult to implement owing to production delays with the Freya. Kammhuber began to realise the potential of airborne radar at this time. After consulting Wolfgang Martini, a technical specialist in the Luftwaffe, the development of Lichtenstein radar began.

Despite the Germans having only a fledgling defence, most of Bomber Command's operations against Germany in 1940–1941 failed. In the second half of 1940 170 RAF bombers failed to return. Only 72 of these were due to growing German competence in night fighting; 42 were claimed by the Luftwaffe and 30 by AAA units. The rest simply ran out of fuel. Most of these cases were caused by poor navigation training in the pre-war era. RAF loss rates were twice those of the Luftwaffe during The Blitz in the period, July 1940 and June 1941. The night offensives were defeated by a force of less than 60 aircraft in 16 Staffeln (squadrons). Night fighter defences claimed 421 RAF bombers in 1941.

One notable tactic was Kammhuber's offensive action. In keeping with the Luftwaffe's defence by offensive action over enemy territory, Kammhuber suggested tracking bombers and attacking them as they took off from their bases in Britain. Hitler refused on the grounds that the German people needed to see the British bombers being brought down over Germany so as to be convinced they were being defended. After October 1941, the Luftwaffe stopped their mini offensive. Hitler's decision relieved Harris and Bomber Command. In 1940–1941 these intruders had been responsible for two-thirds of the RAF losses. The chance to wreak havoc on the bomber offensive was lost. In response, Kammhuber concentrated on building the Kammhuber Line.

=== Organisation of defence ===
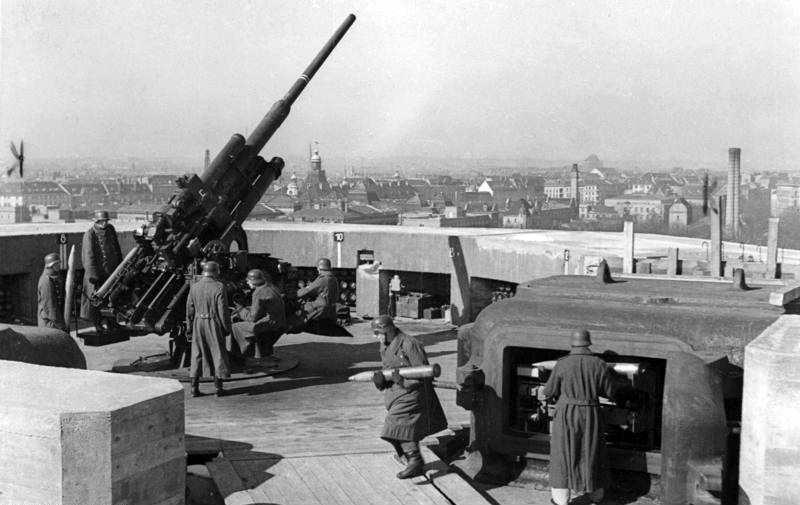
Anti-aircraft defences on the Flakturm Tiergarten in Berlin, one of the flak towers built from 1940

The difficulties of the Luftwaffe to protect Berlin from a series of small-scale raids made by RAF Bomber Command during the Battle of Britain led to the construction of a solid air defence programmes. Luftflotte Reich was eventually produced, which protected all of Germany and Central Europe. Reichsmarschall Hermann Göring ordered General-Leutnant (lieutenant general) Hubert Weise, who had commanded the I Flak Corps with distinction during the Battle of France, to form Luftgaukommando III on 27 September 1940. Weise's Luftgaukommando III was originally meant to protect Berlin but grew to encompass all air-defences as far south as Dresden, Luftgaukommando IV. His authority continued to increase, and Weise eventually formed Luftwaffenbefehlshaber Mitte (Central Air Force Command or "Air Command Central" – Lw Bfh Mitte) on 24 March 1941. This new command gave Weise operational control over all Luftwaffe defence formations in Luftgaue III, IV, VI, VII, XI, and XII/XIII. Weise also created the Nachtjagddivision (Night-fighter division) under the command of Major-General Josef Kammhuber to combat the night operations of Bomber Command. However, command of air defence force of southern Germany was given to Hugo Sperrle's Luftflotte 3. Erhard Milch urged Göring to unite the air defence forces under one command as had been the case for RAF Fighter Command in the Battle of Britain and because the two forces were competing and caused difficulties in coordinated operations. Göring refused. Until Luftflotte 3 was destroyed in the Normandy Campaign in August 1944, the home defence forces remained split between rival commanders.

=== Growth of night defences ===
A map of part of the Kammhuber Line stolen by a Belgian agent and passed-on to the British in 1942. The 'belt' and nightfighter 'boxes' are shown.

The German attitude to air defence was built on the 'counterair' action. Air superiority would be attained and won over enemy airspace, safeguarding the homeland from attack. Despite this, many of the ingredients for an improvised defence were on hand or under development in 1939. The Germans possessed large numbers of AAA batteries, of good quality and varying calibers supported by searchlights, sound detectors and visual ranging apparatus. They were also deploying Freya radar on the coastlines supported by observer networks. Shortly, the Würzburg set was to be introduced. This radar was fire-controlling, allowing AAA installations to deliver well-aimed AAA fire. The Luftwaffe supported its defences with its main day fighter, the Bf 109 while it had no night fighters. There was also no centralised control system and air units were not directed closely from the ground, as was the case with RAF Fighter Command.

When Bomber Command began attacks by night in May 1940, the Germans had no adequate means of intercepting incoming formations of RAF bombers. Pre-war trials aimed at creating a night fighter defence had used a warning service based on sound detectors and searchlights. Night fighters orbited the beacons at altitude outside illuminated area, and when a bomber was caught in the light, the fighter engaged the aircraft. Any focusing of searchlights at altitude signalled the night fighter to enter the illuminated zone and attack. AAA units were ordered to fire at every given opportunity, other than when the fighters were in the combat zone. These experiments ceased in August 1939 and in 1940 were still reliant on searchlight-aided AAA with fighters in a subordinate role.

In response to Bomber Command's offensive in 1940, Josef Kammhuber was asked to develop a more effective night defence. Over the next three years he developed a sophisticated defence known to the British as the Kammhuber Line. Kammhuber began by expanding the illuminated zone to extend from occupied Denmark to northern France. Early warning relied on Freya radar, sound detection devices and observers. Control of the night fighters and AAA batteries was provided by short-range Würzburg sets. The next requirement was a capable night fighter, which the Germans did not have; however, they improvised and used the Messerschmitt Bf 110 heavy fighter and Junkers Ju 88 medium bomber. Both these types proved exceptional in the role.

With an operational system now online, tactical considerations were developed. The first was airborne radar sets, installed on fighters. German pilots complained about this as it created drag and reduced the performance of their aircraft. They preferred to acquire the target visually once ground control had guided them onto the bomber stream. A second change involved the removal of AAA installations and searchlights from the line and grouping them around cities for their defence.

The system had some weaknesses. The line was composed of a series of contiguous boxes. The boundaries were defined by the limitations of the Würzburg radar. The awkwardness of the plotting system used within each box prior to 1942 and the absence of an air-mounted Identification Friend or Foe (IFF), meant that only one fighter at a time could be controlled from the ground. One Würzburg controlled the fighter, the other tracked the bomber. The two plots were not represented on a single radarscope; they came from two different individual operators, each of whom projected a different coloured circle on a plotting table. The controller radioed directions to the fighter on the basis of data provided by the plotting table. Until IFF became available, blips could not be identified.

When operators lost fighters, which often happened, they had to return to the beacon in that particular box. Moreover, Würzburg radar measurements from two sets, could be as much as 500 m (550 yd) out. Compounding command, control and communication problems, a failure to intercept usually resulted. Airborne radar solved this problem. Initially, the UHF-band Lichtenstein BC radar set, the first such radar unit used by the Luftwaffe, had a narrow search angle and when a bomber employed radical evasive manoeuvres, contact could be lost. Despite its weaknesses, with growing sophistication and better organisation the Kammhuber Line became a formidable obstacle.

== USAAF joins the battle (1942) ==
=== New enemy ===
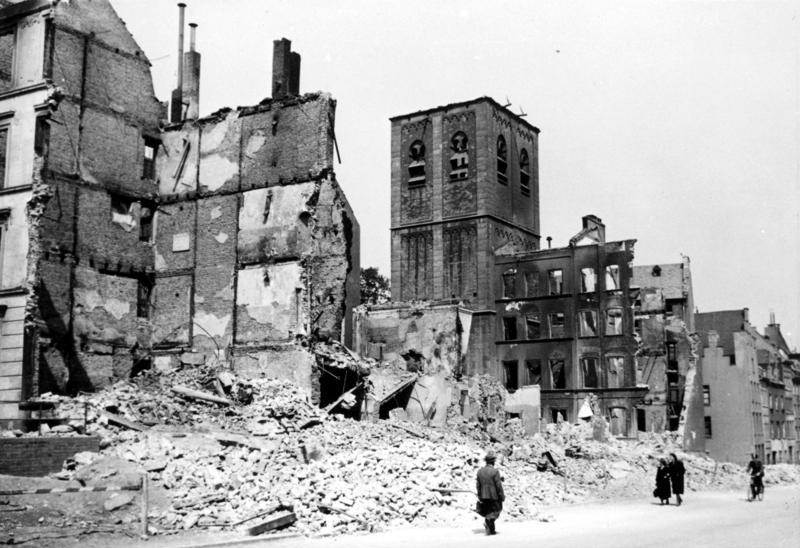
Destruction of Cologne after the 9 June 1942 attack

The entry of the United States into World War II on 11 December 1941 after Hitler's declaration of war was an unwelcome shock for the OKL. For the first year, the expected all-out offensive against German targets did not come. Fully half of the Luftwaffe was assigned to the Eastern Front and its most powerful air command, Luftflotte 4, supported Case (operation) Blue, the Army's drive towards the Stalingrad and into the Caucasus. In the North Africa campaign, the Luftwaffe was losing air superiority, the RAF was increasing its fighter sweeps over France, and its night bombing campaign of German cities was starting to increase in intensity. In May 1942, the bombing of Cologne with 1000 bombers had given the RAF its first success. Despite this, the defence of German air space was given low priority as the Reich expanded on all fronts. On 16 May, in a conference, Hermann Göring made a rare perceptive observation. He noted that if enemy bomber formations started penetrating the German fighter defence at the Channel coast, there was "nothing left in Germany to oppose them". This was correct, but at that time the lack of any mass attacks by the USAAF units arriving in Europe and the failure of RAF bombing in daylight meant few senior commanders were concerned with this development.

The two USAAF Air Forces that bore the burden of the fighting in the European theatre were the Eighth Air Force and the Fifteenth Air Force. The American groups were equipped with Boeing B-17 Flying Fortress and the Consolidated B-24 Liberator heavy bombers. The B-24 had a superior speed, range and bomb load to the B-17, but it could not maintain formation in altitudes above 21,000 ft (6,400 m) making it more vulnerable to AAA and fighter attack.

The American command did not see the need for long-range fighters in 1942, and like Bomber Command in the early war period, believed the bomber would always get through. On that understanding, there was no rush to develop fighter aircraft of this type. The twin-engined mid-range Lockheed P-38 Lightning had been designed as a high-altitude interceptor and was adequate in the escort role. Production had not yet reached the output needed and losses in the Mediterranean had diverted the P-38 establishment strength. As an interim solution the Americans were given the British Supermarine Spitfire, but it lacked the range to reach beyond the coastal areas of western Europe.

=== American strategic aims ===
American strategic policy differed from that of the RAF. German civilian morale was not a primary objective for the planners of the USAAF. American air intelligence believed attacks against economic targets, such as electric and industrial power could achieve the results sought by the RAF, without resorting to what it considered "indiscriminate civilian bombing".

According to American intelligence, by late 1941 the German Wehrmacht and its supporting industry was already stretched thin and suggested that certain targets would be particularly sensitive to attack. As a result, oil and petroleum and synthetic rubber were added to the American "Air War Plan 42". These targets became the focus of the American effort due to the mistaken belief that the Wehrmacht military forces of Nazi Germany were mostly motorised. In actuality German infantry divisions were heavily dependent on horses. In 1942 and 1943, U-boat bases were added due to the growing threat in the Battle of the Atlantic at that time. But the largest difference in American and British was the emphasis the Americans placed on destroying the Luftwaffe. In the British view, this would be achieved by paralysing the German economy.

The American agenda, sent up in June 1943, planned a strike at the German air industry, which was considered a prerequisite to any aerial and or land offensives on the continent. Its aim was to defeat the Luftwaffe in the air, on the ground and to destroy its aviation industry to a degree that it could no longer pose a threat to an Allied invasion of the continent. General Ira C. Eaker had proposed a combined offensive for this operation, named Operation Pointblank. Its plan was based upon selection, or precision attack by USAAF forces in daylight, supported by the area bombing methods of Bomber Command at night. Harris, however, was reluctant to divert forces for precision attacks, as Bomber Command had not been trained in precision bombing, nor would the equipment in the bombers allow for a precision ability until 1944. In theory, the British bomber attack assumed a precision ability, but nothing had been done to ensure such practice. Instead, Harris favoured area bombing against industrial cities. Bomber Command's success during the Battle of the Ruhr and the Battle of Hamburg, and the failures of the USAAF to make an impact in 1943 also seemed to vindicate Harris' policy. Heavy losses among unescorted bombers for little return would ensure a suspension of deep penetration raids in October 1943. It was not until the introduction of a long-range fighter that could escort bombers deep into Germany and back, that a daylight strategy became possible.

=== German view ===
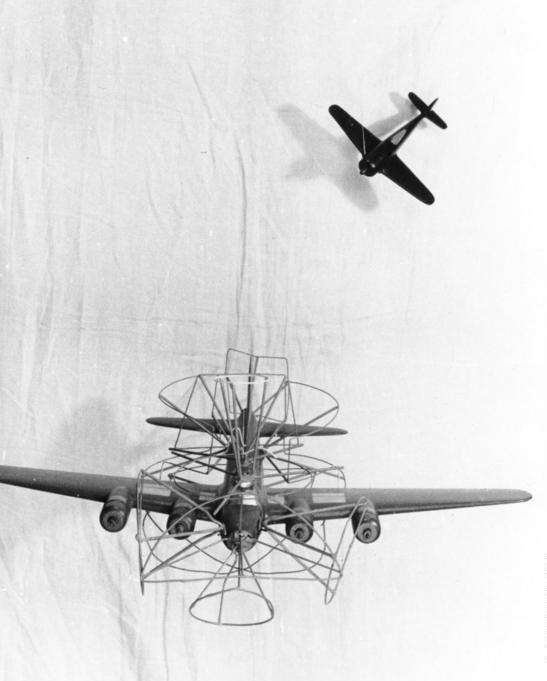
German training material for fighter pilot instructions

In 1942, the German command tended to devalue the combat capability of the United States Army Air Forces. Hitler had repeatedly refused to accept reports from the German military attaché in Washington suggesting that the United States war industry was gearing up and able to produce thousands of first-rate aircraft. Göring reassured Hitler that the B-17 was of miserable fighting quality, stating that the Americans could only build proper refrigerators.

This was a poor state of affairs considering German intelligence sources in Washington, prior to hostilities, had picked up minutely detailed reports on the performance and potential performance of American aircraft. Moreover, the capacity of the American aircraft industry was heavily documented in open-source publications, and General Friedrich von Boetticher, Chief of Source and Information of the German military and air attaché at the Embassy in Washington, had produced a number of these reports on the Boeing B-17 four-engine heavy bomber development, supported by experts in the German aircraft industry, the War Economy and Armaments Office. "Generaloberst" Hans Jeschonnek, the Luftwaffe Chief of Staff, was impressed by these reports and arranged in May 1942 a meeting for Boetticher with Hitler to underline the threat posed by the USAAF. Hitler had then again dismissed the data and agreed with Göring. Jeschonnek despaired. He wrote to General Friedrich von Boetticher:

Boetticher, we are lost. For years I have, on the basis of your reports, forwarded demands to Göring and Hitler, but for years my requests for the expansion of the Luftwaffe have not been answered. We no longer have the air defence I requested and which is needed...we no longer have any time...to provide ourselves with the weapons to fight the dreadful threat which you have predicted and reported to us. Then we will be covered from the air with an enemy screen which will paralyze our power to resist.

Jeschonnek lacked the personality to force the reality of the situation onto his superiors. In the end, unable to assert himself, official optimism won the day.

=== Luftwaffe obsolescence ===
The Luftwaffe's technical advantage was slipping away. A front line experience report of the Luftwaffenbefehlshaber Mitte covering the last quarter of 1941 contained a myriad of complaints, including inadequate early-warning and direction-finding radar, lack of Zerstörer (destroyer, heavy fighter) aircraft with all weather capabilities, and the poor rate of climb of the Bf 109. Generalfeldmarschall Erhard Milch was to assist Ernst Udet with aircraft production increases and introduction of more modern types of fighters. They explained at a meeting of the Reich Industrial Council on 18 September 1941 that the next generation aircraft had failed to materialise and that obsolescent types such as the Heinkel He 111 bomber and Junkers Ju 87 Stuka dive bomber had to be continued to keep up with the growing need for replacements.

We are simply faced with the question of whether we are to have no aircraft at all in 1943 or are to have large numbers of aircraft types which hitherto have proved adequate. For this reason I have recommended to the Reichsmarschall that in 1942–43 we should construct the tried and tested types in large numbers.

In 1941, the Fw 190 A series fighter began to partially replace the Bf 109 as the main Luftwaffe fighter type. The Fw 190A proved to be more manoeuvrable and better armed but its performance above 20,000 ft (6,100 m) decreased and was only rectified in later models. The Bf 109 variants could fight well at high altitudes and were a match for Allied fighters in performance. It was decided by the OKL to keep both fighters in production. In later stages of the campaign the Fw 190 Sturmböcke were introduced, equipped with heavy armament for anti-bomber operations. They were to be used primarily as bomber destroyers while the Bf 109, the better of the two at high altitude, would engage escorting fighters.

== German day superiority (1942–43) ==
=== German priorities ===
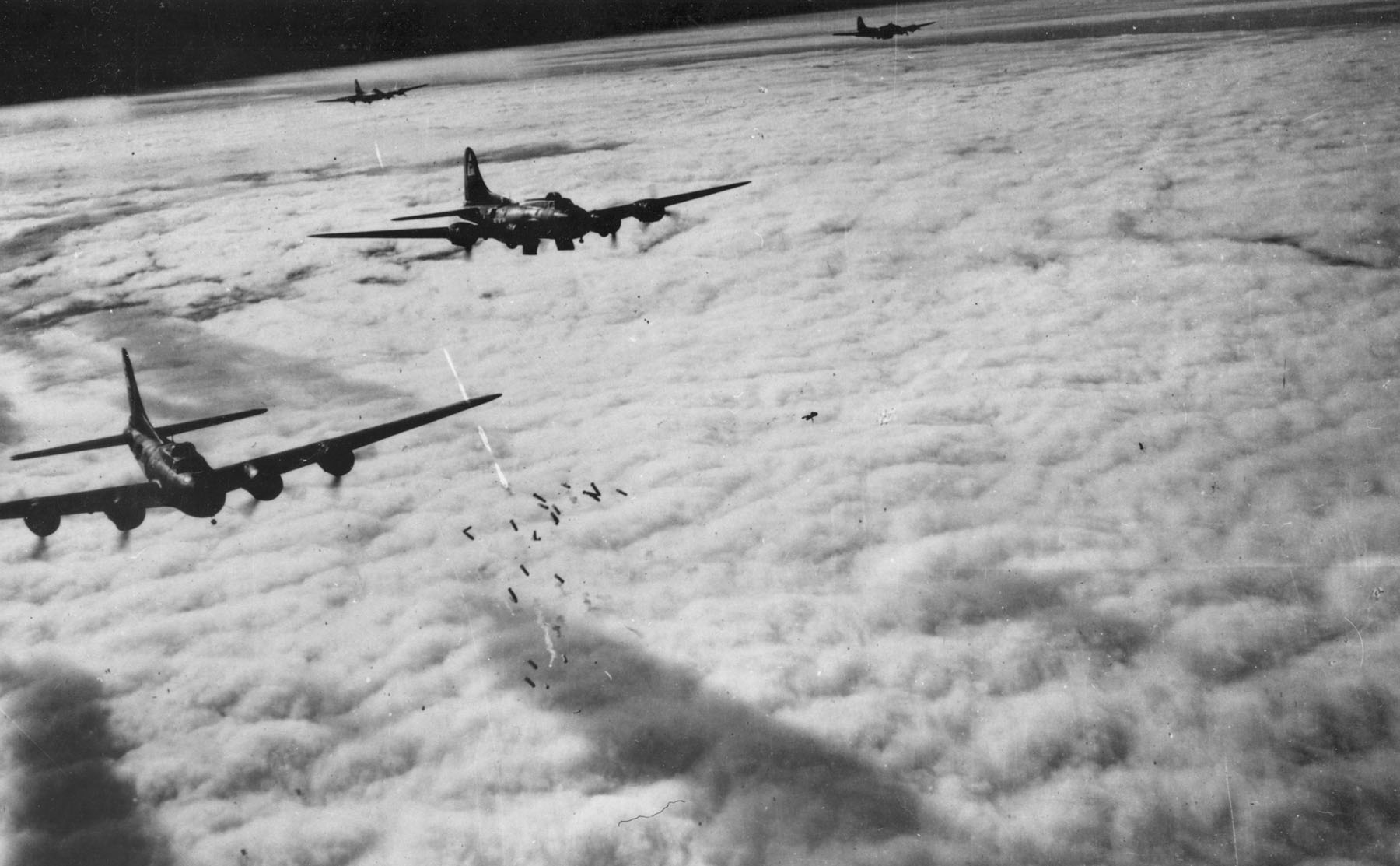
Boeing B-17F bombing through overcast — Bremen, Germany, on 13 November 1943.

The American build up in the ETO was slow. Over a year had passed since Adolf Hitler's declaration of war on the U.S. before the first USAAF air attack was carried out over Germany. Small formations of USAAF B-17s had operated over France and the Low Countries from July 1942 but like the RAF missions of 1940–1941, achieved little. Their first raid on Germany targeted Wilhelmshaven on 27 January 1943. The German air defences at this time consisted of the Luftwaffenbefehlshaber Mitte with 179 fighters, protecting the Netherlands and Germany. Luftflotte 3 protected Belgium and France. Hitler and Göring could not be persuaded to expand the fighter arm at the expense of the bomber arm, and any further reinforcements would have to come from other theatres of war.

The Luftwaffe leadership continued to press for the production of bombers; little attention was paid to new types of fighters. On 22 February 1943, at a conference with his senior staff, including Milch and Jeschonnek, Göring refused to accept the Americans had a decent fighter design and considered the Republic P-47 Thunderbolt that was appearing over German air space inferior to the German fighters. On 18 March 1943, Göring contradicted his earlier assumptions and complained that the designers had failed him. He claimed that the Bf 109 was nearing the end of its useful service life and there was no replacement on the horizon.

Milch and Albert Speer, the new armaments minister, could do little to develop the new aircraft as their energies were directed to increasing production of existing types against the growing Allied offensive. The high-altitude Focke-Wulf Ta 152, the twin-DB 603 engined centre-line thrust Dornier Do 335 as a potential Zerstörer capable of top speeds just beyond that of the fastest marks of the Mustang, and the Me 262, the world's first frontline jet fighter, were delayed for various reasons. The air battles of 1943 and 1944 were fought mostly by the old types that had first flown in the mid-1930s: the Bf 109, the Messerschmitt Bf 110 and Ju 88, along with the early-war origin Fw 190.

=== American day bombing ===
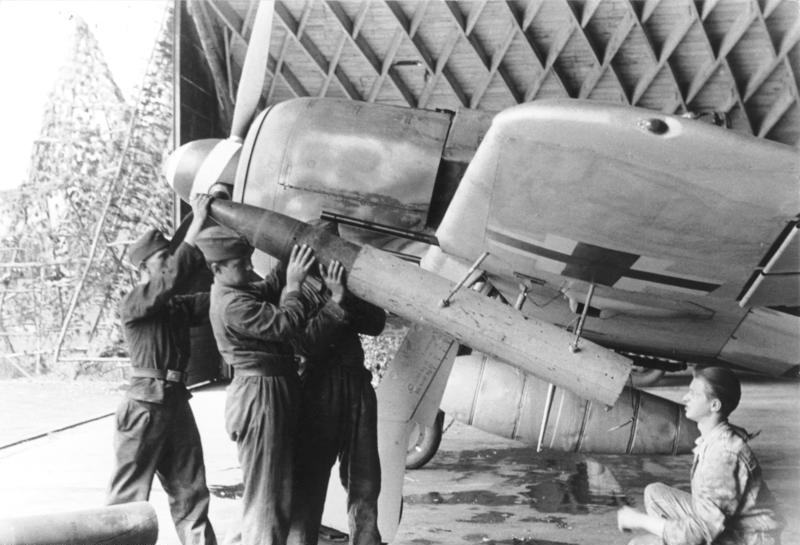
Arming the underwing BR 21 rocket mortar of an Fw 190 A-8/R6 of the JG 26 Stabsschwarm.

The efficiency and performance of the German fighter arm reached its peak during 1943. Without an escort fighter with sufficient range, USAAF bombing raids into Germany proper were costly. The German fighters were becoming more heavily armed to deal with the American bombers; the USAAF adoption of the combat box formations placed a score or more of bombers together for mutual defence, with dozens of heavy .50 calibre (12.7 mm) Browning M2 machine guns — up to 13 per aircraft — aimed outwards from the formations in almost every conceivable direction. Some German fighters were fitted with heavier armament which was devastating to USAAF bombers, like the even larger calibre Bordkanone series of over-30 mm calibre autocannon to attack from beyond the range of the American guns. Bf 110s, Dornier Do 217s and Ju 88s also joined in, firing 20 mm and 30 mm autocannon, the 37 mm and 50 mm Bordkanone guns and unguided air-to-air rockets usable by single and twin-engined defenders, the BR 21 came into use by day fighter wings JG 1 and JG 11 in the spring of 1943 and the Zerstörer wings ZG 26 and ZG 76 by the autumn of 1943. These weapons could cause high losses to the bombers.

The Schweinfurt-Regensburg mission on 17 August 1943 caused serious damage to ball-bearing factories but resulted in 36 of 230 B-17s attacking Schweinfurt being shot down with the loss of 200 men; against Regensburg, 60 B-17s were lost. Fifty-five bombers with 552 crewmen were listed as missing, 55–95 aircraft were badly damaged; Luftwaffe losses stood at around 27 fighters. A second attempt on 14 October 1943, "Mission 115", would later come to be known as "Black Thursday". Of the 291 attacking Fortresses, 77 were lost and around 122 were damaged. The German losses amounted to 38 fighters.

Raids had an enormous effect on the German distribution of weaponry. In 1940, 791 heavy anti-aircraft gun batteries and 686 light batteries protected German industrial targets. By 1944, the size of the anti-aircraft arm had increased to 2,655 heavy batteries and 1,612 light batteries. Hans-Georg von Seidel, the Luftwaffe's quartermaster general estimated that in 1944 it took an average of 16,000 rounds for the 88 mm FlaK 36 gun, 8,000 round for the 88 mm FlaK 41 gun, 6,000 rounds for the 105mm FlaK 39 and 3,000 rounds for the 128 mm FlaK 40 to shoot down an American bomber. A Luftwaffe assessment noted that the average rounds expended per aircraft shot down stood at 2,805 heavy and 5,354 light anti-aircraft rounds in the first twenty months of the war. During November and December 1943, an averaged 4,000 rounds of heavy ammunition and 6,500 rounds of light ammunition per aircraft. An average of 3,343 rounds of heavy and 4,940 rounds of light anti-aircraft were needed to shoot down an Allied bomber from 1939 to 1945. An American postwar study showed, if the Germans had advanced their proximity fuse for their AA shells, American bomber losses would have been 3.4 times as high when flying at an average height of 25,000 ft (7,600 m) at 250 mph (400 km/h). Instead of 11 aircraft per thousand, 37 aircraft would have been lost. Even with a proximity fuse, no change in the outcome of the homeland air defence could be achieved.

The cost of shooting down an aircraft can be examined when placed in relation to the production cost of the aircraft that were intended to be destroyed. Using the cost of bringing down an aircraft with heavy anti-aircraft ammunition totaled 267,440 RM or $106,976 while the cost per aircraft brought down with light anti-aircraft ammunition totaled 37,050 RM or $14,820. A operational Boeing B-17 four-engine heavy bomber, would cost approximately $292,000 and a Consolidated B-24 Liberator would cost approximately $327,000 in 1942. In comparison to the heavy bombers, the unit cost of a North American B-25 Mitchell and Martin B-26 Marauder medium bomber in 1942 was $153,396 and $239,655, respectively. Unit production costs for the medium bombers do not include expenditures for maintenance, ordnance, and fuel, or the costs associated with the training of the bomber aircrews. It is apparent, that a cost of $107,000 per aircraft for the heavy anti-aircraft guns and $15,000 for the light guns was not excessive in comparison to the costs involved in the production of these aircraft.

The production of fighters should have been the priority but Hitler and Göring forbade a switch to the production of defensive fighters. Attrition was having an impact on production; in July 1943 it amounted to 1,263; by December, it had fallen to 687. The reduction was due to American efforts against aircraft factories. In October 1943, German intelligence reported Allied fighter aircraft were reaching as far east as Hamburg. The P-47 and P-38s were fitted with drop tanks to extend their range. Some reached and crashed near Aachen on Germany's west border. General der Jagflieger Adolf Galland brought this to the attention of Göring, who dismissed the event as a fluke. He asserted that the fighters must have been damaged and glided eastward from a great height. The danger was ignored. From mid-October 1943 until mid-February 1944, when the Big Week Allied bomber offensive was launched, the Luftwaffe had won air superiority over Germany. It was also clear to the USAAF that air superiority could not be regained until sufficient numbers of long-range escort fighters became available. The 8th Air Force made no more deep penetrations in clear weather into Germany for the rest of the year.

== British night bombing, 1942–43 ==
=== Area bombing ===
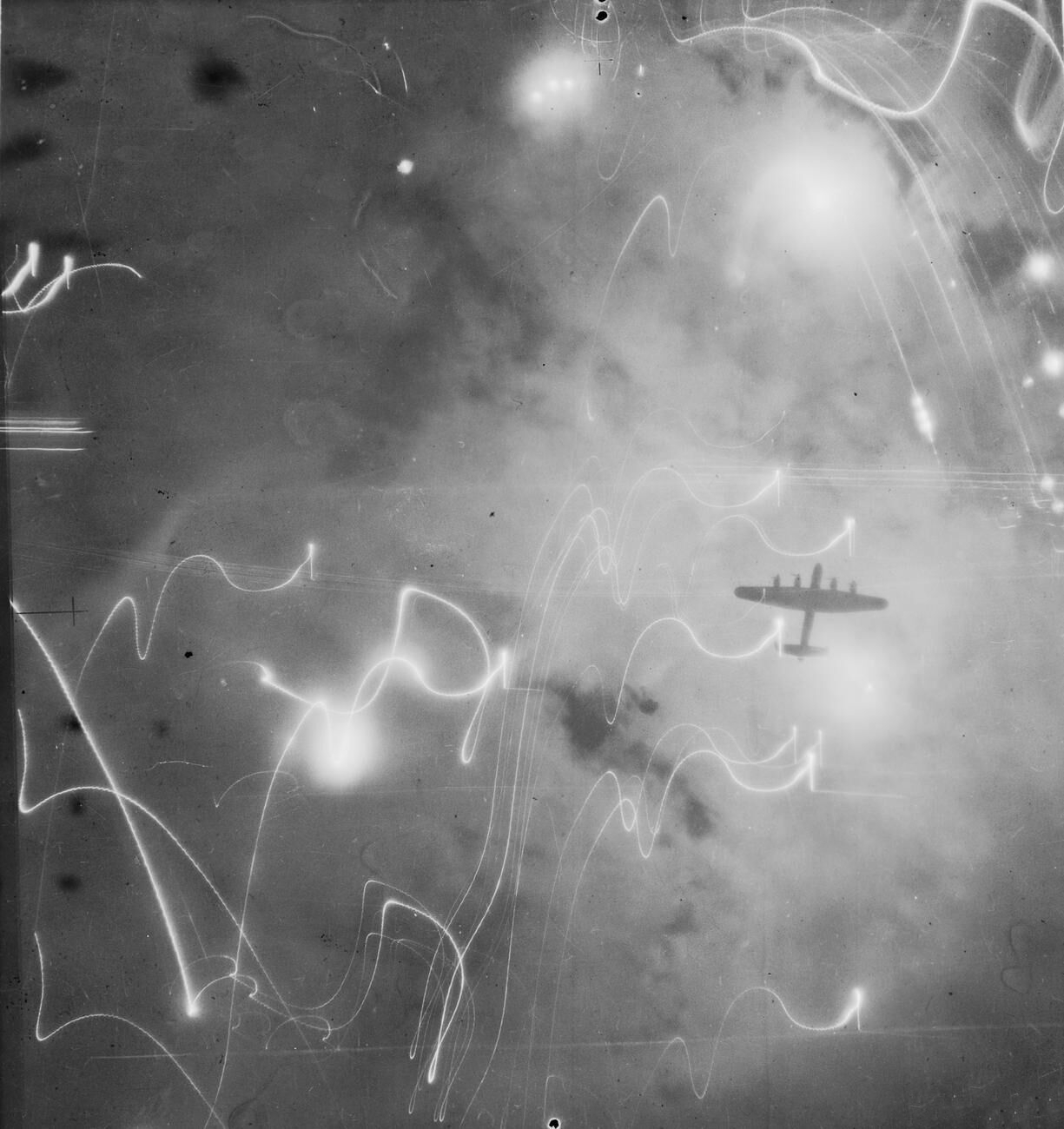
An Avro Lancaster of No. 1 Group over Hamburg on the night of 30/31 January 1943

Introduction of new navigation aids such as Oboe allowed for accurate bombing. The bombing of Cologne in May 1942, the five-month-long Battle of the Ruhr and bombing of Hamburg (Operation Gomorrah) were Allied victories. During the Battle of the Ruhr, Bomber Command severely disrupted German production. Steel production fell by 200,000 short tons (180,000 t) and the armaments industry faced a steel shortfall of 400,000 short tons (360,000 t). After doubling production in 1942, production of steel increased only by 20 per cent in 1943. Hitler and Speer were forced to cut planned increases in production and the disruption caused the Zulieferungskrise (sub-components crisis). The increase of aircraft production for the Luftwaffe was stopped; monthly output failed to increase between July 1943 and March 1944. A raid on Essen on 8 March 1943 destroyed 160 acres (65 ha) of the city centre and caused 75 per cent destruction in a further 450 acres (180 ha).

Attacks on the industrial city Kassel dehoused 123,800 people (62 per cent of the population) and killed 6,000 civilians. Tiger tank production at the main plant of Henschel was halted for months and 88 mm artillery production was halted for four months. RAF bombing disrupted production of the Panther tank, delaying the Battle of Kursk (Operation Citadel). Locomotive production, the Henschel firm's main product from September 1939 – March 1943 ceased in the Ruhr after July 1943 and production was further disrupted by the destruction of 100,000 workers' dwellings. Production of shell fuses was stopped; having tun at 200,000 per month.

For the time being, "Bomber Command had stopped Speer's armaments miracle in its tracks". About 7,000 heavy guns had been diverted from the army to protect the Ruhr. About 640 British bombers had been lost; British and Commonwealth casualties were 2,122 British, 590 Canadian, 160 Australian, 102 New Zealand and two South African air crew. In early May 1943, the workings of the low-UHF band Lichtenstein B/C radar was revealed, when a defecting Luftwaffe crew flew a Ju 88R-1 night fighter from occupied Denmark to Scotland, carrying the earliest form of AI radar to be used by the Luftwaffe. A type of Window (chaff) was devised to jam Lichtenstein B/C, bringing on the Wilde Sau (Wild Boar) tactic using day fighters for night defence.

The Battle of Hamburg (July 1943) was beyond Oboe range, the RAF bombers instead relying on the first operational use of H2S radar but the introduction of Window confused German radar defences; only 12 aircraft failed to return and 31 were damaged on the first night. About 306 of the 728 bomber crews hit within three miles of the marker point. Figures given by German sources indicate that 183 large factories were destroyed out of 524 in the city along with 4,118 smaller factories out of 9,068. Other losses included 580 industrial concerns and armaments works, 299 of which were important enough to be listed by name. Local transport systems were disrupted and did not return to normal for some time. Dwellings destroyed amounted to 214,350 out of 414,500. About a million residents fled the city. Window had given Bomber Command a temporary tactical advantage and a wartime calculation estimated that 87 bombers had been shot down and 78 aircraft had not been lost over Hamburg because of Window.

=== German defences ===
After experiencing several Window attacks, the Luftwaffe changed its tactics. With radar neutralised by Window, German night fighters found it difficult to intercept the bombers. German ground controllers no longer used radar sets to guide German fighters and track individual enemy bombers to intercept. Instead, they gave a running commentary (laufende reportage) on the stream. Individual aircraft were not tracked unless caught in searchlights. These changes did not produce immediate success but pointed the way to a method of loosely controlled cat's eye interception. The success of the new tactics were indicated in increasing bomber losses.

Other tactics were tried. Wilde Sau was used, in which single-engined day fighters using all forms of illumination, searchlights, fires on the ground, reflections on clouds, for visual interception and used the Naxos radar detector, a passive radar detector, instead of radar, to destroy enemy bombers. Implemented on 26 September 1943 the tactics had limited success and the Luftwaffe suffered high losses in the winter of 1943–1944. The 30th Fighter Division (30 Jagddivision), the specialised unit controlling Wilde Sau fighter wings such as JG 300, was disbanded, with the specialized wings later flying regular daytime bomber interceptions instead. German production only just kept pace with night-fighter losses. Some 2,375 aircraft were lost and only 2,613 were built or repaired. The numbers fell from 76 per cent of establishment to 63 per cent in 1943. Serviceability fell from 72 to 66 per cent. The Ruhr battle had cost the RAF 923 bombers and another 813 were lost over Hamburg.

The contribution of RAF Bomber Command to the Allied war effort during this period remains controversial. By the end of 1943, the Nazi leadership had feared that morale would collapse and civil war would ensue. Joseph Goebbels, the Third Reich's propaganda minister, denounced the air raids as "terror bombing" and sought to rally the people to improve morale. Albert Speer recorded in his diary that the people had proved Goebbels' fears unfounded. Morale was improving, the RAF had failed to break morale. After the war, the United States Strategic Bombing Survey concluded that morale fell. Some 75 per cent of the German population believed the war was lost due to the failure of the Luftwaffe to stop the bombing.

== 1944 ==
=== Luftwaffe reorganization ===
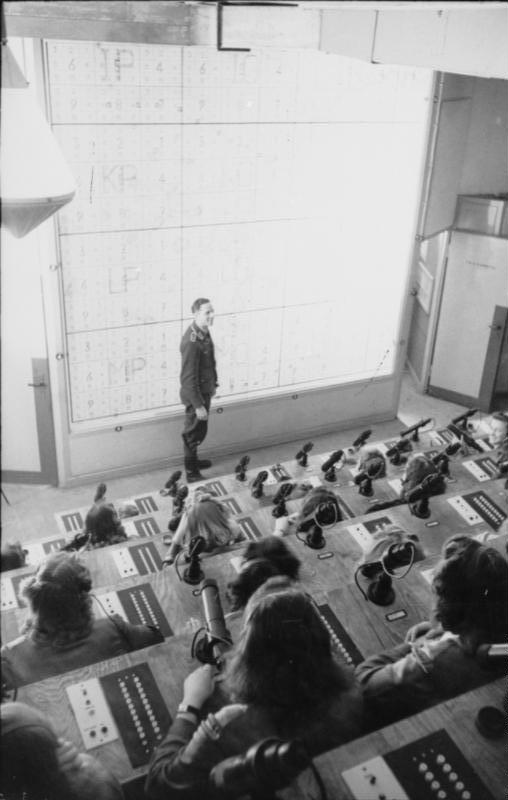
HQ 4th Flak Division, Duisburg-Wolfsburg. The maps on the wall show the night fighter boxes of the Kammhuber line.

The reported appearance of USAAF fighters as far east as Bremen made for uncomfortable reading for the RLV. The defence of Germany took priority over all the territories. Generaloberst Wiese met Adolf Galland's staff in November 1943 and attempted to create a solution to this problem. As it stood, three air divisions were to defend German air space. The 3rd Fighter Division was the first line of defence, protecting Germany's air space at the French border stretching to Luxembourg and into western Belgium. The 1st Fighter Division protected the Netherlands and north west Germany. The 2nd Fighter Division was responsible for the defence of Denmark and north-central Germany and was based near Hamburg. The 4th Fighter Division was to defend the Berlin area and the 5th Fighter Division protected central and southern Germany.

Oberst (colonel) Walter Grabmann, the commander of the 3rd Fighter Division, suggested that the Bf 109 Gruppen should be assigned to engage the U.S. escorts, two Gruppen should take-off ahead of the main interception force to disperse the escort, that the Fw 190 Sturmgruppen would be directed to the bomber fleets after the bombers had been "stripped of their escorts". Wiese ordered that the Zerstörer Bf 110 and Ju 88 units would only attack if the bombers had been deprived of their escort as described above and that the Zerstörer were permitted to attack if the bombers penetrated beyond the range of their fighter escort. The single-engined fighter formations became known as the Gefechtsverband battle formations. The Sturmgruppen formations of heavily armed and armoured Fw 190 As were meant to be escorted by two Begleitgruppen of light fighters, often Bf 109 Gs, whose task was to keep the increasingly dangerous P-51 Mustangs away from the Sturmböcke Fw 190 A bomber destroyers. The importance of home defence was recognised and Luftwaffenbefehlshaber Mitte was renamed Luftflotte Reich (Air Fleet Reich). Wiese was removed from command and the more experienced aviator Hans-Jürgen Stumpff was appointed as its commander.

=== USAAF reorganization ===
General Henry H. Arnold issued the following order to the USAAF air forces in Europe, the aim of Operation Pointblank

My personal message to you – this is a must – is to destroy the enemy air force wherever you find them [it], in the air, on the ground, and in the factories.

General Eaker was removed from command and Lieutenant General Carl Spaatz took over the USAAF Strategic Air Forces in the ETO. James H. Doolittle was given command of the 8th Air Force and on 21 January he ordered that the German fighter force was to be destroyed as a prelude to D-Day, the Allied landing in Normandy. To do this Doolittle had stated that the Luftwaffe could only be destroyed by attrition in the field. General Eaker was reassigned as Commander-in-Chief of the Mediterranean Allied Air Forces. Among the considerable forces under his command were the U.S. Twelfth and Fifteenth Air Force operating from Italy.

=== American day supremacy ===
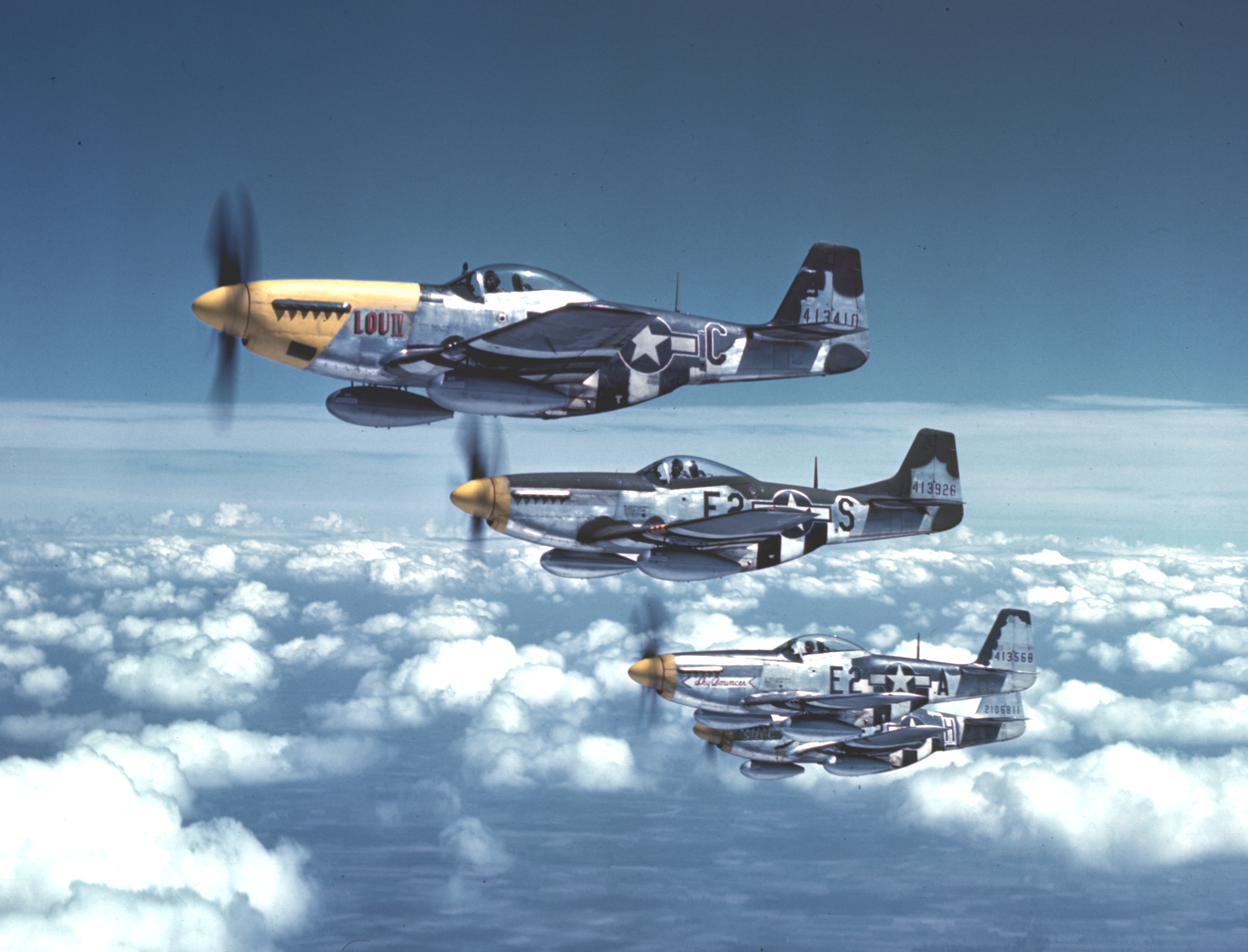
P-51 Mustangs in flight, summer 1944. Unlike the Spitfire, the P-51 could "clear the path" for the USAAF bombers to reach their targets. Their presence would break the Luftwaffe in 1944–45

Maj. Gen. Doolittle began his campaign to destroy the Luftwaffe in February 1944 with Operation Argument, missions against German targets that became known as "Big Week" (20 to 25 February 1944). The planners intended to lure the Luftwaffe into a decisive battle by launching massive attacks on the German aircraft industry. By defeating the Luftwaffe, the Allies would achieve air superiority and the invasion of Europe could proceed. The day bombing campaign was supported by RAF Bomber Command, when they operated against the same targets at night. During "Big Week", the 15th Air Force lost 90 bombers, the 8th Air Force lost 157 bombers and RAF Bomber Command lost 131 bombers. The 8th Air Force strength had dropped from 75 per cent to 54 per cent and the strength of its fighter units had dropped from 72 per cent to 65 per cent. The Reichs-Luftverteidigung lost 355 fighters and its operational strength shrank to 50 per cent. The RLV also lost nearly 100 valuable fighter pilots. While Spaatz claimed victory, the production of German fighters dropped only briefly but the attritional battle would only get worse for the Luftwaffe. After Big Week, air superiority had passed irrevocably to the Allies. "By early 1944," writes Richard Overy, "the German fighter force was obtaining an average net gain every month of only twenty-six new pilots", reducing the Luftwaffe to "a brittle shield".

One of the most important developments of "Big Week" was the debut of the P-51 Mustang. It had the range to escort the USAAF bombers to the target and back again. (Note: The Mustang had been identified as early as 1942 as having the range for bomber escort duties but its engine lacked performance at altitude and in Europe the British had used it for lower level reconnaissance operations. By 1944 this had been solved by adoption of a US-built version of the Rolls-Royce Merlin.) It also had the performance to engage any piston-engine German fighter in service and the firepower of six .50 in (12.7 mm) Browning AN/M2 machine guns with which to destroy them. The number of Mustangs increased from February 1944. The rapid re-equipment of USAAF fighter squadrons enabled Doolittle, in March 1944, to send out Mustang squadrons in formations well ahead of the lead elements of the bomber formations, to perform air supremacy "fighter sweeps" to clear the German skies of the Luftwaffe and permit the USAAF's bombers to operate without serious opposition. As 1944 progressed, each in their turn, first the Zerstörergeschwader ("destroyer" wings)' twin-engined heavy fighters like the Bf 110 and the newer Messerschmitt Me 410 Hornisse, then the heavily armed Fw 190 A Sturmbock bomber destroyer aircraft were driven from the Reich's skies by the P-51s.

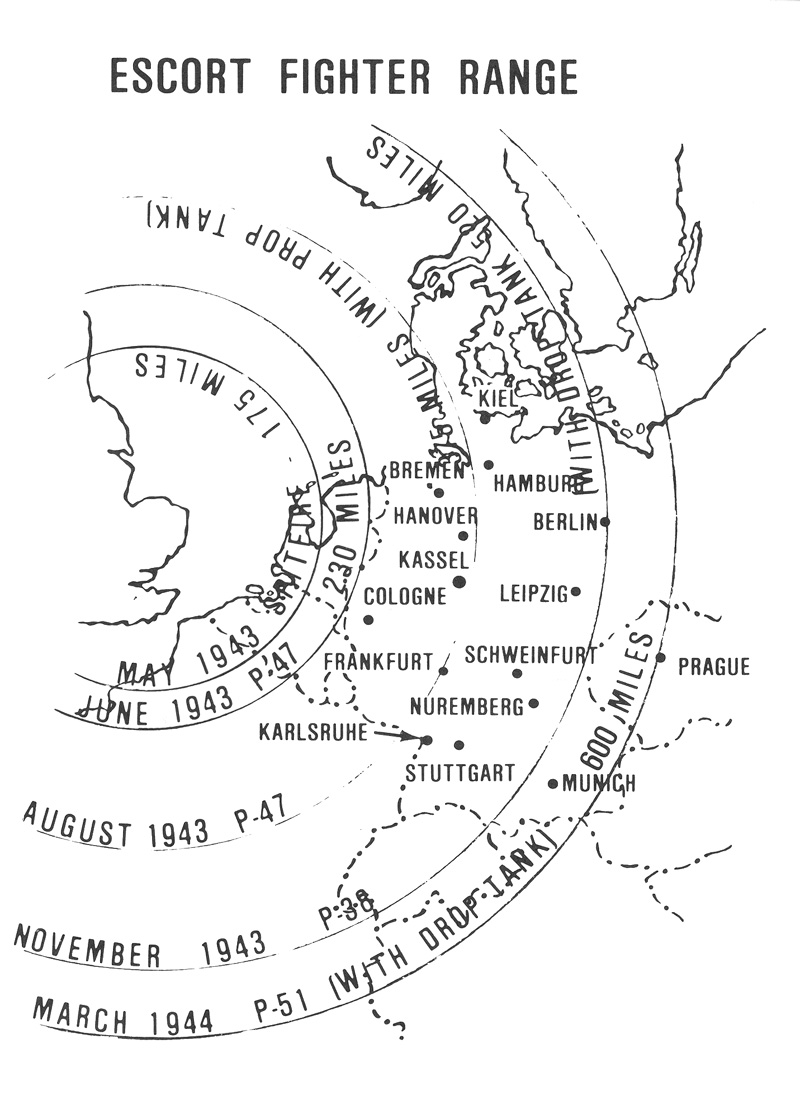
Escort fighter ranges from English bases during World War II

With such serious Allied fighter opposition, the Luftwaffe was put under severe pressure in March and April 1944. According to a report made by Adolf Galland, General der Jagdflieger, on 27 April 1944, 500 aircraft and 400 pilots had been lost in the 10 previous operations. Galland also said that in the last four months 1,000 pilots had been killed. Galland reported that the enemy outnumbered his fighters between 6:1 and 8:1 and the standard of Allied fighter pilot training was "astonishingly high". Galland recognised the Luftwaffe was losing the attrition war and pushed for a focus on quality rather than quantity. Galland stated in his 27 April report, "I would at this moment rather have one Me 262 in action than five Bf 109s. I used to say three 109s, but the situation develops and changes".

The need for technical superiority was evident in the losses in the first half of 1944. The Luftwaffe lost 33.8 per cent of its single-engine fighters and 17.9 per cent of its fighter pilots during February, and reached a new high in March, with 56.4 per cent fighter aircraft and 21.7 per cent fighter pilots written off. The attrition of German fighter pilots continued and peaked in May, when 25 per cent of the German fighter pilot strength had been lost. Between January and May 1944, 2,262 German fighter pilots were killed in the battle for air superiority over Germany and German-occupied territories in Western Europe. Galland remarked over the loss of experienced personnel

The strained manpower situation in the air defence of the Reich demands urgently the further bringing up of experienced flying personnel from other arms of the service, in particular for the maintenance of fighting power to the air arm, tried pilots of the ground-attack and bomber units, especially officers suitable as formation leaders, will now also have to be drawn upon.

The presence of more and more American fighters downing the Luftwaffe's best fighter pilots began a vicious circle. To meet frontline requirements, training time was cut. Shorter training hours meant poorer pilot quality, which in turn increased the likelihood of a pilot being killed in action. The offensive against Axis oil production was also forcing a further cut in training time, making things even worse. The position of the Luftwaffe continued to deteriorate throughout 1944. As German territory contracted, the number of AA guns rose. In November to December 1944, the FlaK defences were more effective at shooting down Allied bombers than the Luftwaffe. One such example indicates that during the attacks on the synthetic oil targets inside the Ruhr, 59 USAAF bombers were lost to AA and 13 were lost to German fighters. Heavy AA did reduce the bombing accuracy as well as acting for a guide for German fighters searching for the bomber stream. Losses reached an all-time high on 26 November, when intercepting a raid, the RLV lost 119 fighters, 60 pilots killed and 32 wounded for just 25 USAAF fighters and six bombers.

=== Night bombing ===
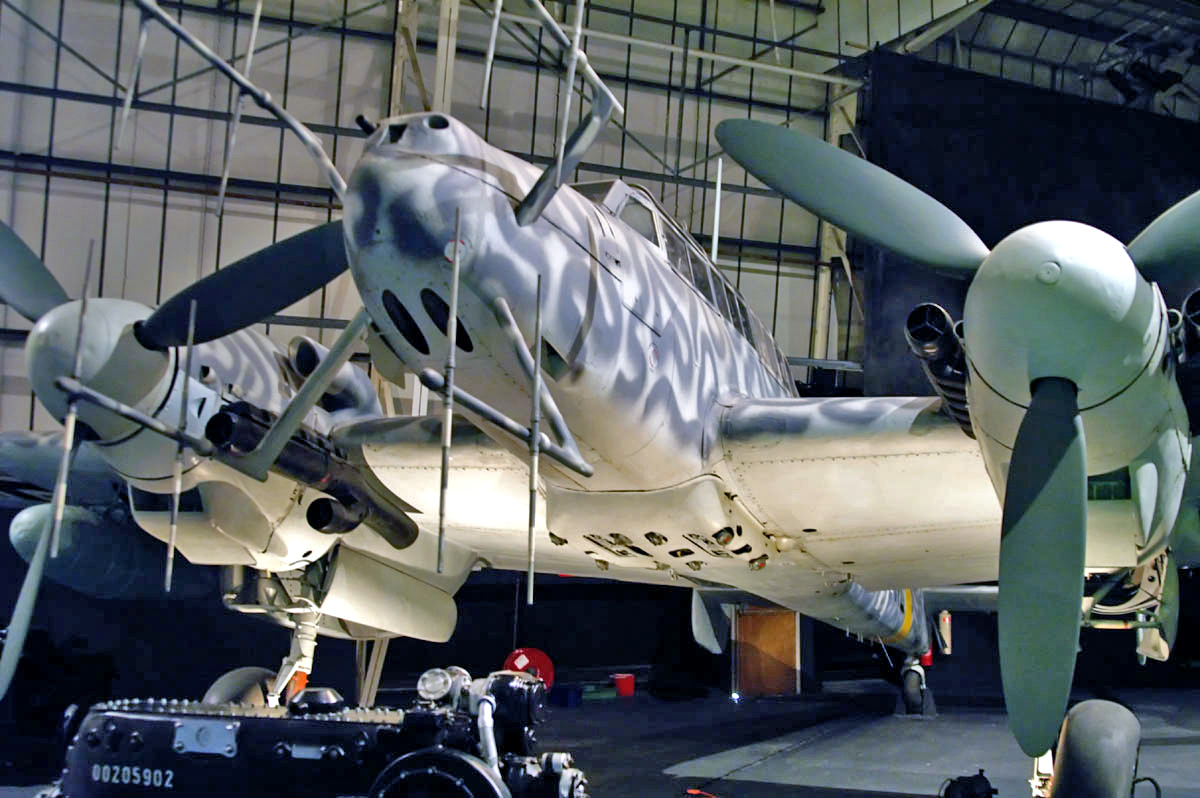
A Bf 110 G-4 in the RAF Museum in Hendon, with second generation FuG 220 Hirschgeweih antennas, without the short-range FuG 202

By the first six months of 1944, unlike the USAAF, RAF Bomber Command's offensive was struggling against the renewed German efforts in the technological war. In mid-1943 Bomber Command had introduced Window over Hamburg rendering ground-based Würzburg and the airborne Lichtenstein C-1 radars ineffective. Window, known to the Germans as Düppel, consisting of small aluminium strips dropped en masse to blanket German radar and make it difficult for the defences to pick out the real position of the raiders. Bomber Command shortened its attacks over the target by five minutes, to reduce chances of interception. This was followed by spoof routes, used to feint the routes of attacks. Later the use of Mandrel airborne jamming screens were used to send the enemy into the wrong area and deny the German fighters the chance of reaching the target area in sufficient strength.

The German response was to increase the efficiency of overland plotting systems. The German Observer Corps was essential to this move initially until the introduction of the Wassermann and Mammuth long-range radar in large quantities and plotting became centralized and simplified. The Germans also used intercept stations to listen to and track the IFF devices when they were switched on in British bombers over German-held territory. When Bomber Command issued orders to keep these turned off, the Germans tracked Monica tail warning radar and H2S navigation radar transmissions from British bombers. H2S was tracked by Naxos while Monica was tracked on Flensburg on night fighters. The British refused to believe tracking H2S transmissions was possible, despite Ultra reports identifying these new radar systems and calculating that they were responsible for 210 of the 494 bombers (42 per cent) lost over Germany from January to February 1944.

The Luftwaffe's introduction of the lower frequency VHF-band Lichtenstein SN-2 airborne radar was an attempt to produce a set invulnerable to jamming. It came into wide usage between autumn 1943 and the beginning of 1944. The new device quickly caused trouble for Bomber Command. The plotting system was quickly proven and was a formidable defence with few weaknesses. In spite of spoof raids which continued to divert German fighter units and reduce losses, the new system was capable of inflicting 8–9 per cent losses against each raid. German night fighter losses amounted to an acceptable 664 aircraft during 1944 operations. Technological developments of the Luftwaffe had a considerable impact on operations in the first half of 1944. Harris' new offensive, which culminated in the Battle of Berlin campaign suffered heavy losses and failed to win the war outright, as Harris had expected. The plan was to break German morale at a projected cost of 500 bombers. The offensive failed, costing Bomber Command 1,128 bombers compared to German loss of 256 fighters.

Harris sought to reduce losses by introducing the de Havilland Mosquito night fighter to protect the bombers. The Bristol Beaufighter was selected instead, which proved inadequate until eventually it was replaced by the Mosquito. Technology and tactics favoured the fighter. Unfortunately for the Luftwaffe, by early July 1944 RAF intelligence discovered the facts of the Monica tail warning sets being detected by Flensburg gear when a Ju 88 G-1 equipped with it and the latest model of the VHF-band SN-2 Lichtenstein radar landed by mistake in England and similarly their H2S bomb-aiming radar by Naxos and curtailed the use of H2S, rendering these three German AI radar and radar detection methods far less effective. The higher-frequency American H2X bombing radar, operating in the 10 GHz frequency range, is not known to have been detected by any Luftwaffe radio technology that existed before the end of the war.

=== Loss of the Kammhuber line ===
The Allied liberation of France and most of the Low Countries in 1944 greatly enhanced the bomber offensive. The Allied armies overran most of the early warning systems of the Kammhuber Line. Until then, the night fighters had succeeded in inflicting a rate of loss on Bomber Command aircraft attacking targets in Germany — exclusive of bomber support, Mosquito and mine laying operations — of 3.8 per cent in July 1944, and on one night — 28/29 July — 8.4 per cent of the force was lost, though this was attributed to the "unusual lightness of the night". Added to this was the growth of German night fighter forces which grew from 550 aircraft in July 1943 to 775 in July 1944.

The Luftwaffe had to combat the night bombers although it could not afford the man or material losses. While their losses were far smaller than those of the British, the crews also suffered through bad weather, lack of skill and a high accident rate due to night flying. In the first three months of 1944, it lost 15 per cent of its crews. The introduction of Mosquito night fighter variants caused problems for the Nachtjagdgeschwader. The Mosquito proved superior in performance to most German night fighters and it is rumoured that German pilots were credited with two kills for shooting one down. Between 1943 and 1945, German night fighters shot down only 50 Mosquito aircraft of all types. The campaign against German oil industries in 1944 caused serious problems. After August 1944, the German night fighter force did not have enough fuel to train new crews or operate effectively. After this date, it ceased to pose a threat to Bomber Command.

=== German production ===
The USAAF planned its 1943 campaign against German arms industry and specific areas of production such as Germany's most famous ball-bearing and aircraft industries. The destruction they caused compares well with that of the more famous battlefields on either the Mediterranean and Middle East theatre or the Eastern Front. Raids in Summer 1943 against Regensburg, a center of the Bf 109 airframe production, caused a reduction of 50 percent output for several months. Strategic bombing attacks against Marienburg in October 1943 completely destroyed an Fw 190 plant. Field Marshal Milch, in charge of German aircraft production recalled:

During June/July [1943], however, the heavy raids – mainly American, but also English – started, which had as their chief target the air-frame industry. As a result we were not able to produce more than those 1,000 fighters a month from August 1943 until February 1944. The additional number which we would have produced was destroyed. According to the programme, by January 1944 we should have reached the figure of 2,000 fighters a month.

Most importantly, the Giulini aluminium processing factory in Ludwigshafen was also hit badly during the bombing raids in July 1943. These attacks reduced the German annual production of alumina by 27,000 tons. Speer's ministry estimated in December 1944 that the aircraft industry was deprived of 25,000 tons through these attacks, which was enough to provide material for the construction of 7,000 aircraft. It was also estimated that between 5,000 - 6,000 fighter aircraft were lost in 1943 alone because of factory destruction, relocation and aluminium losses. The Focke-Wulf production losses were less dramatic as Marienburg was only a final assembly yard and the main destruction was of aircraft actually being assembled at the moment of the raid. About one hundred aircraft had been destroyed, and assembly could be resumed only four months later.

Initial dispersal attempts aimed to move the plants out of the supposed range of American and British bombers had failed, as strategic bombing campaigns continued throughout to 1944. In response to this development, German industries were forced to undertake large-scale dispersion and had to move their production below ground or into concrete-based structures specifically designed to protect the production facilities from bomb attacks. The official order was given in February 1944, following Big Week. Milch described the shift as follows:

When I took the thing over at the end of 1941, my first step was to give the order to disperse from the factories immediately, and out of a floor space of 12 million square meters, 4 million were moved further out, but not below ground. The decision to do that was only made at the beginning of 1944. It was then said that there would be buildings below ground and concreted ones, similar to the big U-boat shelters on the Channel coast. The reason for the long delay was the persistent belief that the war would end victoriously. Goering always believed there would be no large-scale bombing, and always tried to deny the possibility.

By spring of 1944 the German aircraft industry had dispersed 27 main production plants into 729 separate plants. Engine plants were dispersed at 249 locations from the original 51 large plants. The cost and difficulty of dispersing production around increased and caused more problems than just lost production. The dispersed facilities were built with great haste, experienced a shortage of technical personnel and workers, and were considerably less efficient in output per worker than more larger and centered ones. The increased loads taken to 'tool up' new locations, multiplied many times over, created a bottleneck in the railway transportation system. It explains, despite the increased overall production, the failure of German factories to meet planned production in 1944. Another major problem with these new factories was the quality of the aircraft, which came to haunt the Luftwaffe in 1944. The quality of aircraft manufacture in the dispersed factories suffered considerably as Field Marshal Milch noted. "It happened, for instance, that the fittings at the assembly were not accurate enough and similar things. Sometimes it was just that the fittings on the wing section were rough, in other cases the two landing wheels were different."

== Oil campaign, May–November 1944 ==
=== Spaatz' strategy ===
Mounting evidence from a variety of intelligence sources and observation of ground movements indicated that the Germans were suffering desperate local shortages, prompting Allied air forces to intensify their attacks on oil trains and storage dumps near the front lines. The Eighth and Fifteenth Air Forces showed improvement in the use of H2X radar devices, and RAF Bomber Command was employing Gee-H to better advantage as its crews became more experienced. It was discovered that synthetic oil plants lent themselves to successful air attacks more easily than oil refineries, since the former could be put out of action by relatively small damage to critical parts of their complicated machinery. Furthermore, the synthetic plants were much larger than the refineries and were more likely to appear on radar screens because they usually stood some distance outside of cities. The 15AF sharply raised its level of accuracy and developed techniques, such as the use of diamond-shaped formations, which ensured more safety for the bombers as well as greater precision in attack.

A further strengthening of the effort came from the Joint Oil Targets Committee set up in London to supervise the oil campaign more scientifically. This organisation, which drew membership from United States Strategic Air Forces in Europe (USSTAF), the British Air Ministry, and the Ministry of Economic Warfare, evaluated methods of attack and data from the continent concerning German oil difficulties. One of its first decisions was to recommend intensification of attacks on gasoline production, thus giving highest priority to the synthetic oil plants and to crude oil refineries in Romania, Hungary, Poland, and Germany, in that order. Allied strategic planners recognised German petroleum supplies as the weak link. By 1938, German oil imports accounted for two-thirds of its stocks. As war approached, the Germans resorted to synthetic oil production. IG Farben's coal was converted to oil, and this was responsible for all of the Luftwaffe's aviation stocks. On 23 November 1940, the signing of the Tripartite Pact and the addition of Romania and Hungary to the Axis Alliance gave Germany valuable crude oil wells. Still, the Allies controlled over 90 percent of the world's natural oil reserves while the Axis owned just 3 percent.

The USAAF wanted to make oil a priority target. By late spring 1944 it had the long-range fighters to protect the bombers launching sustained attacks on the oil production centres at Ploieşti. At this time the USAAF had conflicting priorities; the combined bomber offensive, Operation Pointblank, and the tactical support of Allied armies in Normandy.

Spaatz and Harris once again protested at the use of their services for tactical support, each with their own agendas and targets. Harris wanted to continue his policy of area bombing industrial cities, Spaatz wanted to attack the oil plants. Both believed their strategies would cripple the German war effort. Spaatz threatened to resign if at least one of the strategic bomber forces was not given over to a campaign against oil targets. He argued bombing tactical targets in France was pointless, as rail yards could be easily repaired. Moreover, he wanted to provoke the Luftwaffe in battle. Spaatz thought that attacking rail targets would not achieve this, but striking at petroleum would. Eisenhower relented, and Spaatz succeeded in moving the USAAF 15AF to Romanian targets. Up until this point, only sporadic attacks had been made against oil targets.

=== Air defence ===
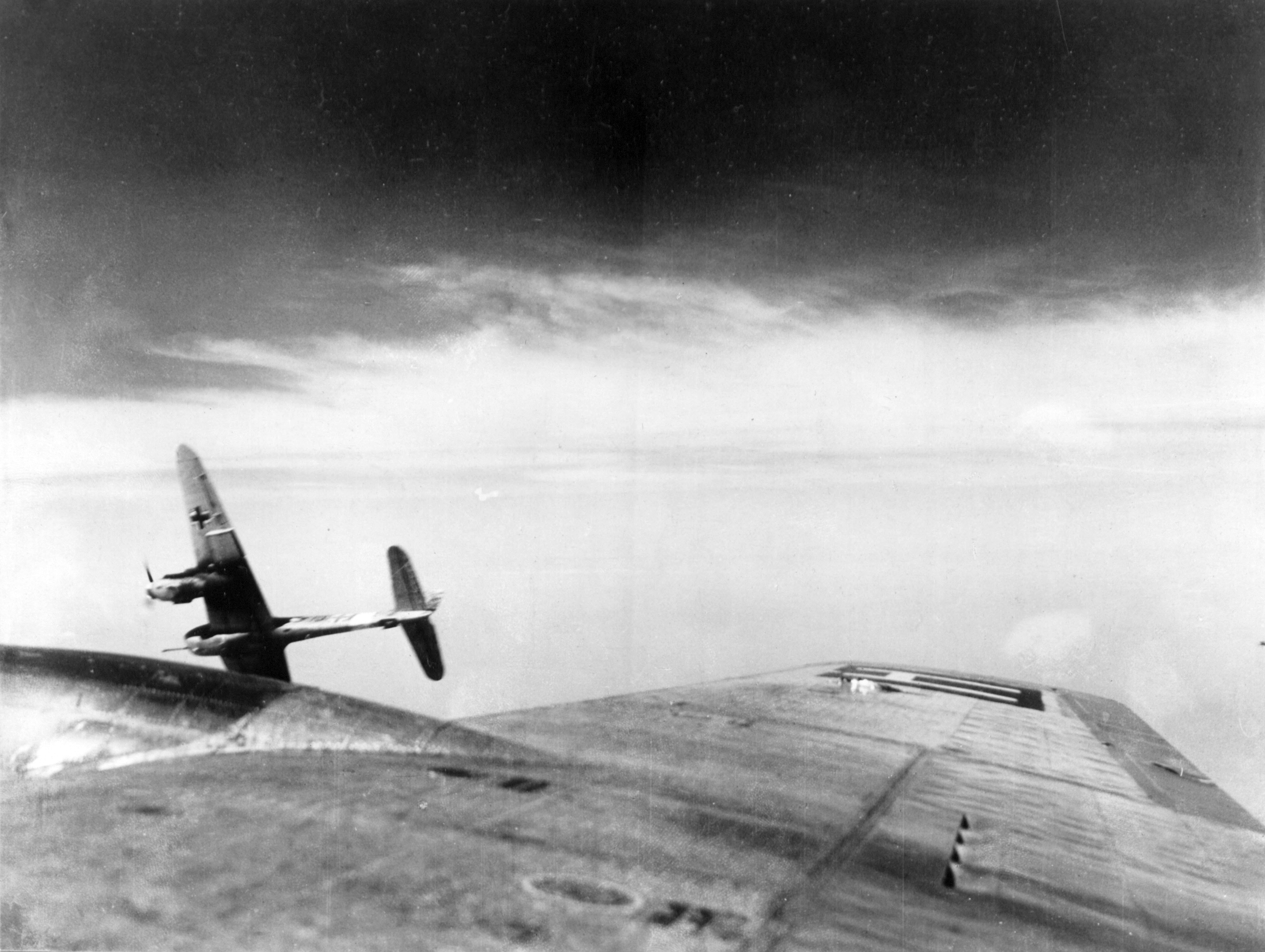
An Me 410A-1/U4 with a BK 5 cannon peels off from attacking a USAAF B-17

The OKL faced two major challenges at this juncture. The first was the reinforcing of Luftflotte 3 from Luftflotte Reich, to deal with the imminent Allied invasion of France. The second was protecting the Reich's airspace from ever-deeper penetrations by the USAAF. The tactical situation offered a glimmer of hope. The Messerschmitt Me 163 Komet rocket-powered interceptor fighter and the Me 262 jet fighter started to enter service in small numbers in mid-1944, with the specialist rocket fighter wing named JG 400 and the Erprobungskommando 262 test unit respectively, with the Jagdgruppe-sized Kommando Nowotny taking over the deployment of the 262 after summer had ended.

The new Sturmgruppen consisting of the Fw 190 A-8/R2 Sturmbock was also entering service with a few specialist Gruppen and Staffeln subunits of at least two Jadgeschwader wings, at least a few of which were allocated to defend Romania. The A-8/R2's armament consisted of two 30 mm MK 108 cannon which could destroy a B-17 with three hits and shoot down a B-24 with one. The Fw 190 A-8/R2 had been armoured and was largely invulnerable to American defensive fire. However, the same attributes that made them deadly "bomber killers", damaged the Fw 190's already limited performance at high altitude, as the fighter became slower and unwieldy. Like the twin-engine Ju 88s, Bf 110s and Me 410s, they would need escorting by Bf 109-equipped units.

=== Oil campaign ===
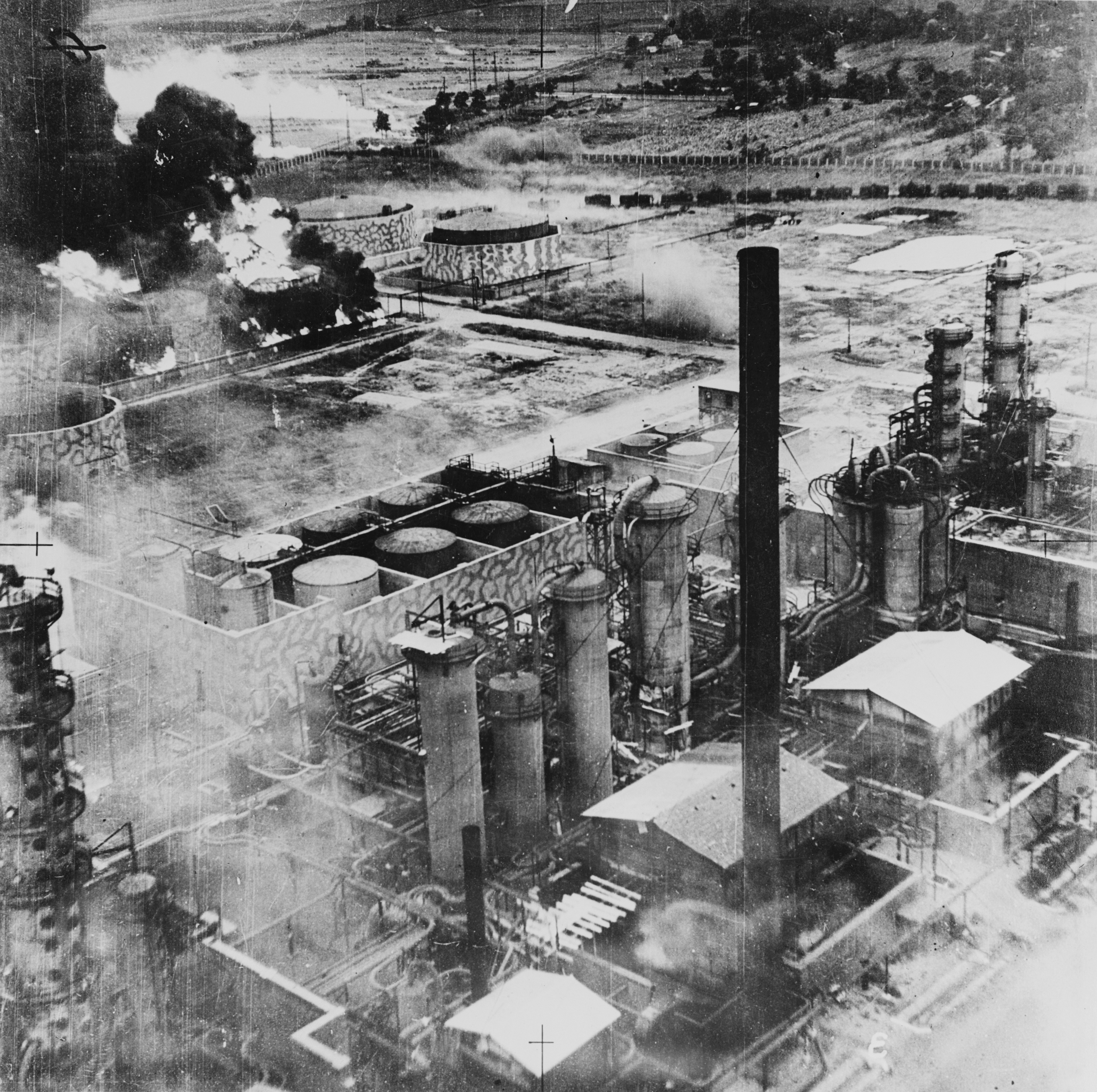
Ploiești oil storage tanks on fire after being bombed by the United States Army Air Forces in Operation Tidal Wave, August 1943. The Ploiești refineries provided about 30 percent of German oil production.

On 12 May 1944, the first USAAF raid, as part of Oil Campaign of World War II began. Its results were dire for the Germans; "12 May 1944, can fairly be described as the worst single day of the war for Germany. Other days brought dramatic defeats, and terrible casualties, but never without the possibility of a reversal of fortune". Albert Speer wrote, "The enemy has struck us at one of our weakest points. If they persist at it this time, then we will soon no longer have any fuel production worth mentioning".

Following the ruinous attacks on oil in April–May 1944, the Germans began to experiment with a new defensive measure, one which proved very satisfactory to them for some time. Whenever their warning system indicated the approach of air fleets over Yugoslavia toward Romania, the Germans would use the 40 minutes available to them before the attack to light hundreds of smoke pots around the Ploesti fields, with the result that most of the area would be concealed by the time the bombers arrived. Thus precision attack was impossible. In an effort to overcome this obstacle, the 15AF dispatched on 10 June 1944, not bombers, but P-38's, to drop 1,000-pound bombs at low-level while others gave cover. At best this experiment was only an equivocal success. The oil situation remained serious for the German defenders. Göring ordered an immediate economy on the use of fuel and large numbers of AAA units were moved from the cities and sent to guard the oil fields.

RAF Bomber Command played a more important role in the oil campaign than is usually recognised. It dropped 93,641 short tons (84,950 t) on these targets, compared to the combined total (from both the 15AF and 8AF) of 119,420 short tons (108,340 t). It dropped more tonnage than the 8AF (48,378 short tons (43,888 t)) operating from the same area of Britain. The RAF's main target was the synthetic oil targets in the Ruhr.

The Luftwaffe was now in an impossible position. The oil industry had to be defended, but doing so was costly. I. Jagdkorps was losing fighters at a rate of 10% per mission, while the American bomber losses were only at two percent. It was not until 28 July 1944, during an attack by the USAAF's 92nd Bomb Group on the Leipzig/Leuna synthetic fuel complex that the first direct point-defence fighter action meant specifically to defend the synthetic oil facilities of Nazi Germany began, as the Messerschmitt Me 163B Komet rocket fighters of I./JG 400 made their first operational strike against the USAAF's bomber combat boxes from JG 400's nearby base at Brandis, to little effect. By September 1944, the loss to kill ratio was against the Luftwaffe. With some exceptions, the loss rate for Allied formations remained under one percent, the German losses were lying between 10 and 20%. The Allied formations were 18 times larger than the Germans by this stage, which meant the respective loss ratios would indicate a higher loss for the German defenders. However, during September the actual kill count of the RLV during September 1944 was 307 shot down for 371 losses. By October 1944, serviceable aircraft amounted to just 347, excluding units on conversion training. The 15AF continued to operate on an impressive scale. During the latter part of the summer its twenty daylight missions against Ploiești, with the aid of the four night missions flown by the RAF, would deny the Germans an estimated 1,800,000 short tons (1,600,000 t) of crude oil.

The USAAF and RAF Bomber Command flew hundreds of missions against the oil targets until late August. The main refinery, in Romania, was virtually destroyed by the bombing. The final raids made against Ploesti were made by 15AF on 19 August 1944. The Romanians, and the Romanian Air Force which had fought alongside the Luftwaffe thus far, capitulated to the advancing Red Army on 23 September and declared war on its former ally. The remaining German fighter units retreated into Yugoslavia and Hungary. The Slovak Air Force and Hungarian Air Force continued to support the Luftwaffe by defending targets in central Europe into 1945.

=== Bomber Command oil raids ===
RAF Bomber Command struck at synthetic targets in the Ruhr districts until November 1944, when the Combined Chiefs of Staff concluded that the oil plants had been reduced to the extent that further attacks were wasteful. Harris was ordered to cease attacks and shift to communications targets. Air Chief Marshal Charles Portal demanded that the British share the losses the 8th Air Force had been suffering by assuming responsibility for two of the largest and most distant targets, Pölitz and Merseburg-Leuna.

The crippling of Germany's warning system in the west as a result of the Allied victory in France and the increased efficiency of blind-bombing techniques made such RAF missions possible and they proved generally successful. Speer reported to Hitler that the night attacks were more effective than the daylight missions, because heavier bombs were used and greater accuracy had been attained. On the average, British operations against oil targets during the autumn, 660 short tons (600 t) of bombs fell as compared with 388 short tons (352 t) for a USSTAF mission. Germany's oil production for November was estimated at 31 per cent of the monthly average in the preceding spring, with most of the supply coming from the benzol plants, which had not been regarded as worth attacking until the autumn. Pölitz and Merseburg-Leuna were listed as severely damaged but in partial operation. All of the synthetic plants in western Germany were reported out of action and the crude refineries around Hamburg, Bremen and Vienna as operation at a fraction of their capacity; only one sizable crude-oil refinery was operating in Germany. Since the beginning of the oil offensive the 15th Air Force had dropped 45,000 short tons (41,000 t), the 8th Air Force 27,000 short tons (24,000 t), and Bomber Command 22,000 short tons (20,000 t) on oil targets.

After the war, Minister of Armaments Albert Speer was asked by both British and American interrogators which air force had a superior bombing strategy. The exact wording of the question was "Which, at various periods of the war, caused more concern; British or American heavy bomber attacks, day or night attacks, and why?". In both cases, Speer replied: "The American attacks which followed a definite system assault on industrial targets, were by far the most dangerous. It was in fact those attacks which caused the breakdown of the German armaments industry." Speer went on to say that on three occasions, a relatively small number of bombing raids (on ball bearings and on the dams in 1943 and on oil and transport in 1944–1945) nearly collapsed the German war machine. That this didn't fully happen was largely thanks to Harris diverting planes from those tasks to his area bombing operations. Intercepted German intelligence from 1943 to 1945 made clear that the American destruction of oil and transportation facilities had a vastly greater impact on the fighting ability of the Wehrmacht than British area bombing operations.

=== Luftwaffe training ===
Fighter flight training; total/operational hours.
Year	Germany	United Kingdom	United States
1939–42	250/75	200/50	–
Oct 42/43	200/50	350/60	260/60
July 43/44	200/25	330/75	320/125
July 44/45	140/25	330/100	400/160

The attacks were having a devastating effect on German fighter units. More and more Staffeln and Gruppen were pulled off the front line on the Eastern Front to reinforce the Reich. Göring ordered that more effort be made to train pilots more thoroughly and quickly whilst expanding the Jagdflieger force. He ordered bomber pilots to be converted to fighter pilots. This failed. Pilot training was shortened to meet the need for pilots. In 1944, the pilot programme had shrunk to eight months and 111 flying hours; just 20 hours on the Fw 190 and Bf 109. This was less than half of what the German cadets could receive in 1942.

German fighter pilot schools relied on fuel. They required 60,000–80,000 short tons (54,000–73,000 t) per month. With this achieved, they claimed to be able to train 1,200 fighter, 250 ground-attack, 40 bomber, 75 jet-bomber, 64 recce and 40 night fighter pilots a month. The schools demands were never met. Just 13,500 short tons (12,200 t) were delivered in July 1944, 13,400 short tons (12,200 t) in August and 6,300 short tons (5,700 t) in September. There were plenty of cadets joining, but the primary schools had to be shut down in favour of running the advanced flight schools. The influx of bomber pilots helped keep output high but it was not to last. By the autumn, the Luftwaffe was seeking anyone who already had basic experience in flying, so they could bypass the primary stages of flight school. One Luftwaffe pilot wrote that "Each time I close the canopy before take-off, I feel that I am closing the lid of my own coffin."

In pre-war establishments, and up until 1942 the German training programs had proven better in terms of training time given to pilots than the Allies. However, German training time reduced through the war, while Allied training time before entering combat increased. The decrease in skill and training was caused by the attrition rates of pilots and skilled aircrew. This was perhaps the most important aspect in the decline of the Luftwaffe as an effective fighting force. The rise in attrition caused a steady decline in skills and experience forced the Germans to curtail training programs to fill empty cockpits. Owing to this, new pilots with less skill than their predecessors were lost. The increasing losses, in turn, forced the training establishments to produce pilots even more rapidly. Once this cycle began, it was difficult to escape. One of the key indicators in the decline of German fighter pilot skill after 1940 air battles was the rise of losses owing to non-combat causes. By the first half of 1943 losses sustained in accidents were as many as losses in combat.

=== Impact on Axis oil production ===
The oil campaign was hugely successful. In June 1944, just 56,000 short tons (51,000 t) of oil had been produced against the planned total of 198,000 short tons (180,000 t). Consumption was well above stocks produced since mid-May 1944 so that by the end of June 1944, it had been reduced to a reserve of just 410,000 short tons (370,000 t), a 70% reduction from 30 April 1944. ULTRA intercepts confirmed cutbacks in non-operational flying as a direct consequence. According to Speer, by 21 July 98% of all Axis fuel plants were out of operation. The monthly production fell from 180,000 short tons (160,000 t) in March 1944 to 20,000 short tons (18,000 t) in November; inventory dropped from 575,000 short tons (522,000 t) to 175,000 short tons (159,000 t). The campaign caused huge shortfalls in fuel production and contributed to the impotence of the Luftwaffe in the last 10 months of the war, and the inability of the German Army to conduct counter offensives.

== German communications collapse, autumn 1944 ==
=== Decline of night defences ===
In 1943–1944, the Nachtjagdgeschwader had proved the most efficient branch of the Luftwaffe. Even as late as July 1944, it was scoring successes. In August, fuel shortages caused a curtailing of operations. From that date, the Nachtgeschwader failed to make a serious impact on the night offensive. Another cause was the Allied advance across western Europe which deprived the Germans of their early warning systems. Supplementing this were the countermeasures introduced by RAF Bomber Command, such as intruder operations in which Mosquito night fighters would attack German fighters as they took off from and returned to base. This compelled the Germans to restrict the use of airfield lighting and assembly beacons. Owing to fuel shortages, training of night crews was not as thorough, while the demands of manpower throughout the Wehrmacht had brought about a decline in quality in the servicing and ground staff. Some of the fighter force had to be withdrawn to the Eastern Front to counter night attacks by the Soviet Air Force. Its strength increased from 800 to 1,020 aircraft between 1 July and 1 October 1944, of which 685 in July and 830 in October were engaged in operations against Bomber Command.

In late 1944, the German defensive line only extended from Denmark to Switzerland. This enabled British bombers to fly toward German territory without interception on the way. The German strength was thus reduced, with more aircraft diverted to reconnaissance over the North Sea to pick up Allied bomber formations. In spite of the problems, the Luftwaffe night fighter force was stronger numerically than ever before. It remained intact and presented a theoretical threat to Bomber Command, particularly when the British made deep penetrations. Since the first half of 1944, the outlook for the force had changed from increasing efficiency to a probability of declining effectiveness as the effects of poor training, shortage of fuel, diversion of effort and shortage of manpower became perceptible.

=== Bomber Command, Transportation Plan ===
In the last year of the war, the bombing offensive "came of age". With German defences strategically defeated, the economy was exposed to enormous bombing attacks. Most of the tonnage dropped by the American and British bomber fleets was done so in the last year of the war, about 1,180,000 long tons (1,200,000 t) from 1,420,000 long tons (1,440,000 t) during the entire war. The attacks did not go entirely unopposed. There were 50,000 heavy and light German anti-aircraft guns concentrated around essential industrial targets. There remained an "exiguous [very small] fighter force by day and night".

The USAAF could throw 7,000 bombers and fighters total into the battle while the RAF could field 1,500 heavy bombers alone which could carry up to 20,000 lb (9,100 kg) of bombs each. By the autumn of 1944 Allied fighter-bombers and fighters could strafe and engage targets untouched. This firepower was aimed at the Ruhr industrial heartland and the communication networks in Germany. The rail lines were mostly destroyed, halving coal and material traffic by December 1944 compared to the previous year. With the loss of the Romanian oilfields in August 1944, the campaign critically reduced German oil supplies and production remaining. In the winter of 1944–1945, the German state was carved into "isolated economic regions" living off stocks while military production was to be moved under ground into caves, salt mines and underground factories manned by slave labourers. The conditions underground were far from ideal. Poor ventilation and high humidity damaged precision machinery and tools which made the quality of production poorer. In salt mines, the walls absorbed the moisture and eased conditions. The logistical difficulty of locating several thousand workers well over 1,000 ft (300 m) below ground level interfered with production.

Attacks on rail and communications began in the autumn 1944. The Luftwaffe could not prevent the destruction of Kassel's electricity supply, ending the contribution of Krupp Gusstahlfabrik (Cast Steel Works) to the war on 23 October 1944. This type of direct attack was unable to stop production altogether. Attacks on communications came closest to achieving this goal. The Dortmund–Ems canal was drained by an RAF attack in September 1944. The huge marshalling yard at Hamm was damaged and its capacity reduced by 75 per cent. Between 14 and 18 October, rail shipments of coal from the Ruhr ended. By early October 1944, only one train in fifty was getting into the Ruhr. The lack of iron ore caused a drop in steel production of 66 per cent. About 102,796 short tons (93,255 t) of bombs had been dropped on these targets. It was enough to bring near total collapse between November 1944 and January 1945.

Statistics point to the gradual strangulation of the German transport system. The daily average of freight car tonnage dropped from 183,000 in June 1944 to 83,000 in December 1944. Waterborne movements of coke and coal from the Ruhr declined from a daily average of 76,000 tons in July 1944 to 14,200 by January 1945. Stocks of coal, the main source of power for German industry, rose from a low of 186,000 tons kept at the mine heads in July 1944 to 2,767,000 tons in February 1945. The rise in tonnage demonstrates the collapse of the transport network, which meant raw materials could not be transported from the mine heads to the factories. It is estimated that production fell by 22 per cent between May 1944 and January 1945. Of this reduction, 50–60 per cent of this was due to attacks on transport.

== Defeat (1945) ==
=== Daylight defence ===
Summary of the AAF–RAF air war against Germany.

When 1945 began, the Allies were on the German borders, and in some places had captured German towns such as Aachen. With the territory under German control contracting and Germany's territory itself in the frontline, the distinction between tactical and strategic attack blurred. Allied air forces and the Luftwaffe found themselves providing support over the frontline while battling to attack or defend industrial targets.

Hitler attempted to improve Germany's continually worsening military position by launching operation Wacht am Rhein (Battle of the Bulge). The RLV handed over some Jagdgeschwader to support the offensive along with the Luftwaffe's frontline fighter units. The cost was high, some 400 pilots were killed or missing between 16 and 31 December 1944. On 1 January 1945 the Luftwaffe began Operation Bodenplatte to win back air superiority and help restart the German offensive. The Luftwaffe committed over 900 fighters to the operation. It failed, sacrificing the remaining fighters of the Luftwaffe.

The Luftwaffe's senior staff had hoped that projects like the Me 163 rocket fighter or Me 262 jet fighter would be given priority as a bomber interceptor as early as 1942. Problems with jet engine development hampered its development. The operations of the Me 262 and Me 163 did little to offset the problem of Allied air superiority. German losses remained high due to the difference in fighter pilot training. On 7 April 1945, for example, only 15 of 183 Fw 190s and Bf 109s which were covered by a large force of Me 262s, returned to base from an interception sortie. The Germans reported the loss of 133 fighters, claiming 50 of the USAAFs bombers in return but only eight American bombers were shot down.

The Western Allied invasion of Germany had begun. Airfields and bases that were located in western Germany were quickly overrun. The Luftwaffe defended its airspace but suffered heavy losses flying defensive and offensive sorties over the Allied bridgeheads that were established along the Rhine River. A few successes were scored and some missions, including forces of up to 40–50 Me 262s were used but the losses inflicted on the bombers were not decisive. The Allied Air Forces had air supremacy and attacked the Luftwaffe on the ground and in the air; from 13 to 15 April, 400 German fighters were lost to Allied ground attack fighters.

=== End of the area offensives ===
The intensifying campaign against German cities did not cease. Among the most controversial raids was the Bombing of Dresden in February 1945. The rationale of the raid was to aid the advance of the Red Army on the Eastern Front. Dresden was a communications hub which, it was believed, was transporting German reinforcements eastward. It was also thought it harboured significant industries in and around the city. Its value as a military target was and still is questioned due to the city's apparent lack of industrial potential in its centres and the late stage of the war. Soon afterwards, Allied forces conducted Operation Clarion. The operation sent thousands of bombers and fighters by day and night to target smaller cities and targets of opportunity.

Attacks on other targets took place in March–April 1945, while desperate measures by the Luftwaffe with units like the Sonderkommando Elbe aerial ramming unit and the debut of the Heinkel He 162 Spatz jet fighter by JG 1 took place against the Allies during the concluding weeks of the Allied air offensive, in addition to the efforts of the two Me 262-equipped jet units, JG 7 and JV 44. On 19 April, the Combined Chiefs of Staff issued a directive that stipulated all further operations by strategic air forces should be diverted to land-support duties. It came into effect on 5 May. On 26–27 April, the USAAF flew their last operations. Bomber Command, by that time, with Operation Exodus, was busy supporting the Army by flying out Allied prisoners of war.

On 8 May, Nazi Germany capitulated, ending the fighting in the European theatre of World War II.

== See also ==
- Emergency Fighter Program
- Sonderkommando Elbe
- Strategic bombing during World War II
