= Zahme Sau =

German interception tactic

Zahme Sau (lit. 'tame sow'; generally known in English as tame boar) was a night fighter interception tactic conceived by Viktor von Loßberg and introduced by the German Luftwaffe in 1943. As a raid approached, the fighters were scrambled and collected to orbit one of several radio beacons throughout Germany, ready to be directed en masse into the bomber stream by running commentaries from the Jagddivision. Once in the stream, fighters made radar contact with bombers, and attacked them for as long as they had fuel and ammunition.

== See also ==
- Wilde Sau ('wild boar')
- List of World War II electronic warfare equipment: Tactics
- Night fighter
