= Viktor von Loßberg =

German airman and Knight's Cross recipient

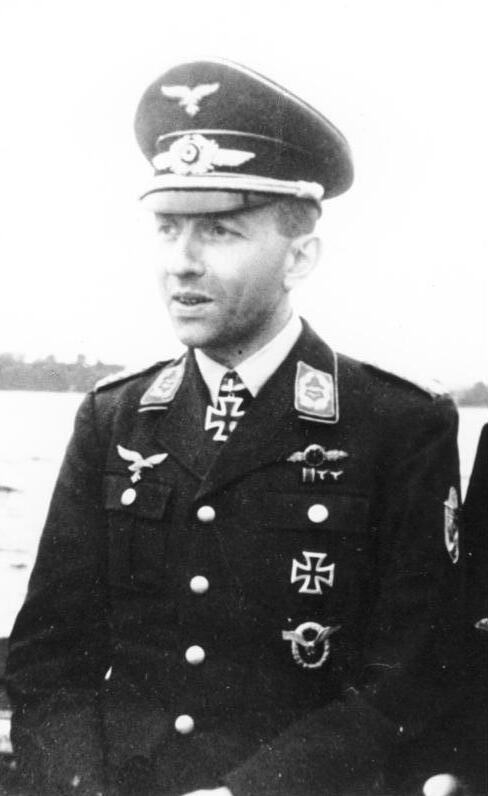
- Born: 14 March 1904; Posen
- Died: 24 May 1983 (aged 79); Garmisch
- Military career
- Allegiance: Nazi Germany; West Germany
- Branch: Luftwaffe; German Air Force
- Service years: 1933–1945, 1956–1962
- Rank: Oberst im Generalstab
- Unit: Kampfgeschwader 26
- Conflicts: World War II
- Awards: Knight's Cross of the Iron Cross

Viktor von Loßberg (14 March 1904 – 24 May 1983) was a German air officer during World War II. He was a recipient of the Knight's Cross of the Iron Cross of Nazi Germany. Loßberg was instrumental in conceiving the concept of Zahme Sau ("Tame boar"), a night fighter tactic of the Luftwaffe.

== Career ==
Loßberg was born on 14 March 1904 in Posen, present-day Poznań in Poland, at the time in the Province of Posen, a province of the Kingdom of Prussia in the German Empire. He joined the military service of the Wehrmacht in late 1933 at Braunschweig. The Treaty of Versailles signed after World War I had prohibited Germany from having an air force. Before the Luftwaffe was unveiled in 1935 he was trained as a pilot at civilian flight schools.

Loßberg was involved in the testing and evaluation of various aircraft for use as night fighters. Generalfeldmarschall Erhard Milch favored the conversion of aircraft like the Junkers Ju 88 or Junkers Ju 188 because it did not influence production numbers. Josef Kammhuber preferred the new Heinkel He 219. The Reichsluftfahrtministerium (RLM—Reich Air Ministry) ordered a comparison test which was held 25–26 March 1943 at Rechlin. Loßberg was ordered to fly the Ju 188 E-1 in mock combat against the He 219 piloted by Werner Streib. The test proved the He 219 to be superior to the Ju 188.

Loßberg played a significant role in the development and introduction of the Zahme Sau night fighter system in mid-1943, which began the recovery of the German night defences against the increasing size of attacks by Royal Air Force Bomber Command and eventually replaced the Himmelbett (canopy bed) of the Kammhuber Line. In the introductory phase of Zahme Sau, Loßberg flew 39 night fighter missions from airfields operated by I./Nachtjagdgeschwader 1. In total he flew 39 missions without claiming any victories.

At the end of the war, Colonel von Loßberg was the last director of the Luftwaffe Technical Academy in Berlin-Gatow.

After the war Loßberg was involved in the establishment of the new Luftwaffe. From 1 Feb 1956 he commanded the preparatory office for Luftwaffe materiel in Bad Godesberg which in April 1956 moved to the USAF Air Station Erding. From 1 June 1956 through 31 March 1958 he was the first commander of the Luftwaffe Materiel Command ("Materialkommando der Luftwaffe", MatKdoLw). His first task was to build a supply regiment from several units which were transferred from the USAF.

== Awards ==
- Iron Cross (1939) 2nd Class (27 September 1939) & 1st Class (11 May 1940)
- Knight's Cross of the Iron Cross on 17 October 1941 as Major and Gruppenkommandeur of the III./Kampfgeschwader 26
