= 30th Fighter Division =

Division of the German Luftwaffe in WWII

30th Fighter Division (30. Jagd Division) was one of the primary divisions of the German Luftwaffe in World War II. It was formed in September 1943 in Berlin and disbanded on 16 March 1944. The Division was subordinated to the Luftwaffenbefehlshaber Mitte (September 1943 – February 1944) and the I. Jagdkorps (February 1944 – March 1944).

== Commanding officers ==
- Oberst Hajo Herrmann, September 1943 – 16 March 1944

== Subordinated units ==
- Jagdgeschwader 300
- Jagdgeschwader 301
- Jagdgeschwader 302

== See also ==
- Luftwaffe Organisation
