= Kurt Bühligen =

German World War II fighter pilot and wing commander

- Bühligen as a Major
- Born: 13 December 1917; Granschütz, Province of Saxony, German Empire
- Died: 11 August 1985 (aged 67); Nidda, Hesse, West Germany
- Burial place: City cemetery at Nidda
- Military career
- Allegiance: Nazi Germany
- Branch: Luftwaffe
- Service years: 1936–1945
- Rank: Oberstleutnant (lieutenant colonel)
- Unit: JG 2
- Commands: 4./JG 2, II./JG 2, JG 2
- Conflicts: See battles World War II: Battle of Britain; North African campaign; Western Front; Dieppe Raid; Operation Bodenplatte; Defense of the Reich
- Awards: Knight's Cross of the Iron Cross with Oak Leaves and Swords
- Other work: automotive sales

Kurt Bühligen (13 December 1917 – 11 August 1985) was a Luftwaffe wing commander and fighter ace of Nazi Germany during World War II. He was credited with 112 enemy aircraft shot down in over 700 combat missions. His victories were all claimed over the Western Front and included 24 four-engine bombers and 47 Supermarine Spitfire fighters.

Born in Granschütz, Bühligen, volunteered for military service in the Luftwaffe of Nazi Germany in 1936. Initially trained as an aircraft mechanic, after the outbreak of World War II, he was trained as a pilot. In June 1940, he was posted to Jagdgeschwader 2 "Richthofen" (JG 2—2nd Fighter Wing). He fought in the Battle of Britain and claimed his first aerial victory in that campaign on 4 September 1940. Promoted to an officers rank, Bühligen was appointed squadron leader of the 4. Staffel (4th squadron) of JG 2 in April 1942. In November 1942, his unit was transferred to the Mediterranean and theatre where he claimed his 50th aerial victory in February 1943. Back on the Channel Front, he was appointed commander of the II. Gruppe (2nd group) of JG 2 in April 1943. Following his 96th, Bühligen was awarded the Knight's Cross of the Iron Cross with Oak Leaves in March 1944. In April 1944, he replaced Kurt Ubben as commander of JG 2. He claimed his 100th victory on 7 June 1944 and in August received the Knight's Cross of the Iron Cross with Oak Leaves and Swords after 104 aerial victories. In May 1945, he was taken prisoner of war by Soviet forces and released in 1950.

Bühligen then settled in Nidda where he worked in automotive sales. He died on 11 August 1985 in Nidda.

== Early life and career ==
Bühligen, the son of a pipefitter, was born on 13 December 1917 in Granschütz, in Province of Saxony of the German Empire. He joined the military service of the Luftwaffe with Flieger-Ersatz-Abteilung (Aviator Replacement Unit) in Oschatz on 13 March 1936. Following his recruit training he served as an aircraft mechanic with Kampfgeschwader 153 (KG 153—153rd Bomber Wing) from September 1937 to 15 February 1938. He then served as a mechanic with 2. Staffel (squadron) of Kampfgeschwader 4 (KG 4—4th Bomber Wing) from 16 February 1938 to 30 April 1939.

== World War II ==
JG 2 "Richthofen" insignia

World War II in Europe had begun on Friday 1 September 1939 when German forces invaded Poland. Bühligen then trained as a pilot, (Note: Flight training in the Luftwaffe progressed through the levels A1, A2 and B1, B2, referred to as A/B flight training. A training included theoretical and practical training in aerobatics, navigation, long-distance flights and dead-stick landings. The B courses included high-altitude flights, instrument flights, night landings and training to handle the aircraft in difficult situations.) and was then posted to Jagdgeschwader 2 "Richthofen" (JG 2—2nd Fighter Wing), named after World War I fighter ace Manfred von Richthofen, as an Unteroffizier (non-commissioned officer) on 15 June 1940. (Note: For an explanation of Luftwaffe unit designations see Organization of the Luftwaffe during World War II.) There, he was assigned to the 2. Staffel, the 2nd squadron of I. Gruppe (1st group) of JG 2 which was equipped with the Messerschmitt Bf 109 fighter aircraft. At the time, 2. Staffel was under the command of Oberleutnant (First Lieutenant) Karl-Heinz Greisert. On 4 September 1940, Bühligen claimed his first aerial victory, a Hawker Hurricane shot down over Dover. He was then transferred to 6. Staffel, a squadron of II. Gruppe (2nd group) of JG 2. There, Bühlingen frequently flew as wingman to Greisert. Greisert had been placed in command of II. Gruppe on 2 September. In September 1940, Bühligen claimed three aerial victories, a Hurricane on 11 September and a Supermarine Spitfire fighter on 26 and 30 September each. Following three further victories claimed in October, he was awarded the Iron Cross 1st Class (Eisernes Kreuz erster Klasse) on 29 October 1940. Bühligen claimed one further aerial victory on 7 November 1940, a Hurricane southeast of the Isle of Wight, before he was transferred to 4. Staffel, also a squadron of II. Gruppe.

On 18 June 1941, II. Gruppe moved from Beaumont-le-Roger to Abbeville-Drucat where it stayed for the next six months. From this point on, the Gruppe defended against the RAF Fighter Command "non-stop offensive" over France. In July and August 1941, while flying with 4. Staffel, Bühligen claimed seven Spitfires shot down, one on 7 July, two on 10 July, one on 11 July, two on 23 July and another on 7 August respectively. He then served with the Stab (headquarters unit) of JG 2 and claimed six further aerial victories in August and September 1941, one Hurricane and five Spitfires. One year after his first aerial victory, Bühligen was awarded the Knight's Cross of the Iron Cross (Ritterkreuz des Eisernen Kreuzes) on 4 September 1941. At the time he was credited with 21 aerial victories and 15 tethered balloons shot down.

On 1 January 1942, Bühligen was promoted to Leutnant (second lieutenant). In March 1942, II. Gruppe began converting to the Focke-Wulf Fw 190 radial engine fighter aircraft. Conversion training was done in a round-robin system, Staffel by Staffel, at the Le Bourget Airfield near Paris. The conversion completed by end-April. From then on, the Gruppe was equipped with the Fw 190 A-2 and A-3 variant. Bühligen was appointed Staffelkapitän (squadron leader) of 4. Staffel of JG 2 on 1 August 1942, thus succeeding Oberleutnant Jürgen Hepe who was transferred. He claimed his first aerial victories as Staffelkapitän during the Dieppe Raid on 19 August. That day, II. Gruppe claimed 26 aerial victories, including four Spitfires shot down by Bühligen, for the loss of four Fw 190s. In early November, the Gruppe moved from Beaumont to Merville before ordered to relocate to the Mediterranean Theater.

=== Mediterranean theater ===
In early November 1942, the Western Allies launched Operation Torch, the Anglo–American invasion of French North Africa. On 17 November, II. Gruppe of JG 2 was withdrawn from the English Channel Front and ordered to San Pietro Clarenza, Sicily. At the time, the Gruppe was equipped with the Fw 190 A-3, some Fw 190 A-2s, and received the A-4 variant in early December. This made II. Gruppe of JG 2 the only Fw 190 equipped fighter unit in the Mediterranean Theater. The Gruppe flew its first missions on 19 November, securing German air and sea transportation to Tunis. That day, elements of II. Gruppe began relocating to Bizerte Airfield. Bühlingen claimed his first aerial victory in this theater of operations on 3 December over a Spitfire south of Tebourba

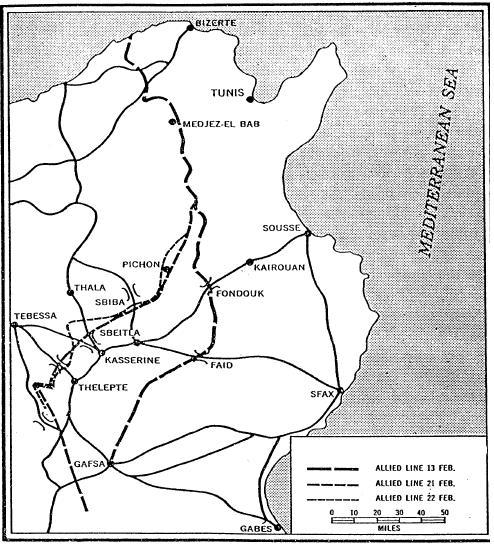
II. Gruppe area of operations in Tunisia.

On 5 December, his acting Gruppenkommandeur (group commander) Oberleutnant Adolf Dickfeld submitted Bühligen for preferential promotion to Oberleutnant. The nomination was reviewed by the commanding general of the II. Fliegerkorps (2nd Air Corps) General der Flieger (General of the Aviators) Bruno Loerzer, headquartered at Taormina, Sicily and by Feldmarschall (Field Marshal) Albert Kesselring, at the time Oberbefehlshaber Süd (Commander in Chief in the South). Both Loerzer and Kesselring approved the nomination leading to Bühligen's promotion on 1 February 1943. On 26 December, eighteen Boeing B-17 Flying Fortress bombers of the United States Army Air Forces (USAAF), escorted by eight Lockheed P-38 Lightning fighters, attacked the harbor of Bizerte destroying approximately 100 fuel barrels and damaged one cargo ship. II. Gruppe intercepted the USAAF formation on their return from the target area, claiming three P-38 fighters shot down, including two by Bühligen.

In January 1943, the bulk of II. Gruppe of JG 2 was based at an airfield at Sidi Ahmed near Bizerte. On 4 January, 4. Staffel intercepted a formation of Douglas A-20 Havoc "Boston" bombers, escorted by Curtiss P-40 Warhawk fighters, on bombing mission to Fondouk, approximately 140 kilometers (87 miles) south-east of Bizerte. The bombers were already under attack by Bf 109s from I. Gruppe of Jagdgeschwader 53 (JG 53rd—53rd Fighter Wing) when 4. Staffel encountered the bombers west of Fondouk. In this encounter, Bühlingen shot down a P-40 and a Boston which he misidentified as a Martin B-26 Marauder bomber. On 7 January, II. Gruppe moved to Kairouan Airfield. The next day, II. Gruppe flew numerous missions and claimed twelve aerial victories, including three P-38s shot down by Bühligen, for the loss of two Fw 190s. One of the P-38s claimed by Bühligen was a 49th Fighter Squadron aircraft strafing tanks near Kairouan. On 14 January, he was credited with the destruction of another P-38. A flight of B-17s bombers, escorted by P-38s, had attacked the harbor of Sousse.

On 30 January, five Fw 190s from 4. Staffel were scrambled at 07:30 to intercept a flight of six Spitfires spotted northwest of Kairouan. Shortly after takeoff, 4. Staffel intercepted the Spitfires and claimed three Spitfires shot down, including two by Bühligen, without loss. On 2 February, Bühligen became an "ace-in-a-day", claiming three P-40s, a Spitfire and a Bell P-39 Airacobra in combat near Kairouan. Only one Spitfire was shot down on this day and Bühligen, according to the claims list, was the only German to report one destroyed. No. 225 Squadron RAF lost Flying Officer S.H.A Short killed near Kasserine. Ten P-40s of the 33rd Fighter Group were lost—eight from the 59th Fighter Squadron and two from the 60th Fighter Squadron. Five American pilots were killed in action and one captured. German pilots claimed 13 Allied fighters; 11 were recorded lost in aerial combat.

II. Gruppe flew its last combat missions in North Africa on 11 and 12 March 1943. At the time, the Gruppe had ten Fw 190s remaining, seven of which still serviceable. Bühligen claimed three aerial victories on 12 March, two P-38s and a B-17 near La Sebala Airfield. On 18 March, the aircraft were handed over to III. Gruppe of Schnellkampfgeschwader 10 (SKG 10—10th Fast Bomber Wing). The pilots and ground personal were flown to Sicily on 22 March.

=== Gruppenkommandeur ===
II. Gruppe was then ordered to Beaumont-le-Roger, where they arrived on 27 March 1943 and equipped with the Bf 109 G. Until mid-May, the Gruppe trained on this fighter aircraft. During this training period, Bühlingen was promoted to Hauptmann (captain) on 1 May. The first operational missions following the relocation to France were flown on 13 May. On 15 May, II. Gruppe defended against an attack on the airfield Poix-Nord at Poix-de-Picardie. During this engagement, Bühligen claimed a North American P-51 Mustang shot down 30 kilometers (19 miles) north-northwest of Berck. Two days later, he claimed a Hawker Typhoon shot down north of Caen. Bühligen received the German Cross in Gold (Deutsches Kreuz in Gold) on 25 June 1943.

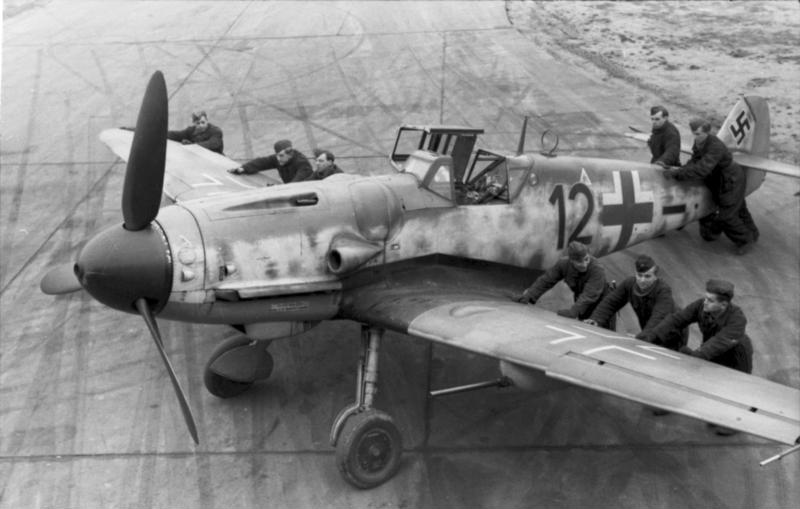
Messerschmitt Bf 109 of JG 2, September 1943

On 1 July 1943, Bühligen was appointed Gruppenkommandeur (group commander) of II. Gruppe of JG 2. He replaced Hauptmann Erich Rudorffer in this capacity who had been transferred to IV. Gruppe of Jagdgeschwader 54 (JG 54—54th Fighter Wing). That day, most of the air elements of II. Gruppe relocated to Évreux-Fauville Air Base. On 4 July, Bühligen led II. Gruppe against an attack by the USAAF VIII Bomber Command, later renamed to Eighth Air Force, on Nantes and Le Mans. The Gruppe claimed three B-17s and five escort fighters shot down for the loss of a Bf 109 shot down and six further damaged. Bühlingen was credited with the destruction of a Spitfire and a Republic P-47 Thunderbolt in this engagement. On 14 July, Bühligen led II. Gruppe in defense of an USAAF attack on the airfields at Villacoublay and Le Bourget. That day, II. Gruppe claimed three B-17s, one P-47 and four Spitfires, including one by Bühlingen, destroyed for the loss of two Bf 109s and one further Bf 109 damaged.

In early September 1943, Allied air operations under the deception Operation Starkey were very active. On 6 September, II. Gruppe defended against USAAF heavy bombers attacking Stuttgart. That day, II. Gruppe claimed eight aerial victories, including four by Bühlingen, for the loss of three Bf 109s.

Bühligen was promoted to Major (Major) on 1 January 1944 and received the Knight's Cross of the Iron Cross with Oak Leaves (Ritterkreuz des Eisernen Kreuzes mit Eichenlaub) on 2 March 1944. He was the 413th member of the German armed forces to be so honored and at the time he was listed with 96 aerial victories. The presentation was made by Adolf Hitler at the Berghof, Hitler's residence in the Obersalzberg of the Bavarian Alps, on 4 April 1944. Among others, also present at the award ceremony were Hauptmann Hans-Joachim Jabs, Major Bernhard Jope and Major Hansgeorg Bätcher.

=== Wing commander ===
On 27 April 1944, Major Kurt Ubben Geschwaderkommodore (wing commander) of JG 2 was killed in action. In consequence, Bühligen became the last Geschwaderkommodore of JG 2. Command of II. Gruppe was then passed to Hauptmann Georg Schröder who had commanded the 4. Staffel of JG 2. On 7 June 1944, Bühligen shot down two Republic P-47 Thunderbolt fighters in the vicinity of Caen, taking his total to 100 aerial victories. He was the 75th Luftwaffe pilot to achieve the century mark. Following his 104th aerial victory, Bühligen received the Knight's Cross of the Iron Cross with Oak Leaves and Swords (Ritterkreuz des Eisernen Kreuzes mit Eichenlaub und Schwertern) on 14 August 1944. He was the 88th member of the German armed forces to be so honored. On 1 October, Bühligen was promoted to Oberstleutnant (Lieutenant Colonel)

On 5 December 1944, Bühlingen was briefed on the operational objectives of Operation Bodenplatte, an air superiority operation in support of the Battle of the Bulge launched on 1 January 1945. The meeting took place at the headquarters of II. Jagdkorps (2nd Fighter Corps) at Flammersfeld. JG 2's main objective was Sint-Truiden Airfield where it sustained heavy losses in the attack. Bühligen himself did not fly during Operation Bodenplatte.

As Geschwaderkommodore, Bühligen was ordered to Berlin on 22 January 1945 and attended the meeting with Reichsmarschall Hermann Göring which was later dubbed the Fighter Pilots' Mutiny. This was an attempt to reinstate Generalleutnant Adolf Galland as General der Jagdflieger who had been dismissed for outspokenness regarding the Oberkommando der Luftwaffe (Luftwaffe high command), and had been replaced by Oberst Gordon Gollob. The meeting was held at the Haus der Flieger in Berlin and was attended by a number of high-ranking fighter pilot leaders which included Bühligen, Günther Lützow, Hannes Trautloft, Hermann Graf, Gerhard Michalski, Helmut Bennemann, Erich Leie and Herbert Ihlefeld, and their antagonist Göring supported by his staff Bernd von Brauchitsch and Karl Koller. The fighter pilots, with Lützow taking the lead as spokesman, criticized Göring and made him personally responsible for the decisions taken which effectively had led to the lost air war over Europe.

During the final days of World War II in Europe, Bühligen led JG 2 in operations against the Soviet advance on the Eastern Front. On 18 April, the remnants of JG 2 moved to Cham. Two days later, JG 2 relocated to Berlin Tempelhof Airport via Plzeň where they refueled and moved on to Leck Airfield. From Leck, JG 2 flew missions in support of the German forces fighting in the Battle of Berlin. At the time, Leck was under constant attack by the RAF. On 23 April, some elements of I. and II. Gruppe which were still based at Cham surrendered to US forces. A few pilots managed to fly to Pocking before moving on to the area of Erding-Holzkirchen-Prien. With 12 aircraft remaining, Bühligen disbanded JG 2 on 30 April while parts of JG 2 were dispersed in Leck and Föching near Straubing. The last elements of JG 2 surrendered to British forces on 8 May at Leck. An engine failure caused Bühligen to be taken prisoner by the Soviets, being finally released in 1950.

== Later life ==
In 1950, Bühligen was released from captivity and returned to West Germany. He settled in Nidda, Hesse where he ran two car dealerships. Bühligen died on 11 August 1985 and was buried at the city cemetery at Nidda in section D, grave 42.

== Summary of career ==
=== Aerial victory claims ===
According to US historian David T. Zabecki, Bühligen was credited with 112 aerial victories. Spick and Obermaier also list him with 112 aerial victories, of which 40 were claimed over the North Africa, 72 over the Western Front including 24 four-engined heavy bombers, claimed in over 700 combat missions and a mission-to-claim ratio of 6.25. Forsyth also lists him with 24 four-engined bombers shot down. Mathews and Foreman, authors of Luftwaffe Aces — Biographies and Victory Claims, researched the German Federal Archives and found records for more than 99 aerial victory claims, plus nine further unconfirmed claims. All of his victories were claimed on the Western Front and include 13 four-engined bombers.

=== Awards ===
- Wound Badge in Silver
- Honor Goblet of the Luftwaffe (24 July 1941)
- Front Flying Clasp of the Luftwaffe
  - in Gold (31 July 1941)
  - in Gold with Pennant "700"
- Combined Pilots-Observation Badge
- German Cross in Gold on 25 June 1943 as Leutnant in the 4./Jagdgeschwader 2
- Iron Cross (1939)
  - 2nd class (10 September 1940)
  - 1st class (29 October 1940)
- Knight's Cross of the Iron Cross with Oak Leaves and Swords
  - Knight's Cross on 4 September 1941 as Oberfeldwebel and pilot in the II./Jagdgeschwader 2 "Richthofen" (Note: According to Scherzer in the 4./Jagdgeschwader 2) (Note: According to Von Seemen as pilot in Jagdgeschwader 2 "Richthofen".)
  - 413th Oak Leaves on 2 March 1944 as Major (war officer) and Gruppenkommandeur of the II./Jagdgeschwader 2 "Richthofen"
  - 88th Swords on 14 August 1944 as Major (war officer) and Geschwaderkommodore of Jagdgeschwader 2 "Richthofen"

=== Promotions ===
1 January 1942:	Leutnant (Second Lieutenant)
1 February 1943:	Oberleutnant (First Lieutenant)
1 May 1943:	Hauptmann (Captain)
1 January 1944:	Major (Major)
1 October 1944:	Oberstleutnant (Lieutenant Colonel)

== Notes ==
Military offices
Preceded by Major Kurt Ubben	Commander of Jagdgeschwader 2 "Richthofen"; 28 April 1944 – 8 May 1945	Succeeded by none
