= Profen =

Profen may refer to:

- Profen (drug class), a class of pharmaceutical drugs
- Profen, a brand name of the pharmaceutical drug ibuprofen
- Profen (Elsteraue), a town in the municipality of Elsteraue, Germany
- Profen coal mine, a coal mine in Saxony-Anhalt, Germany
