= Hans-Joachim Jabs =

German World War II fighter pilot

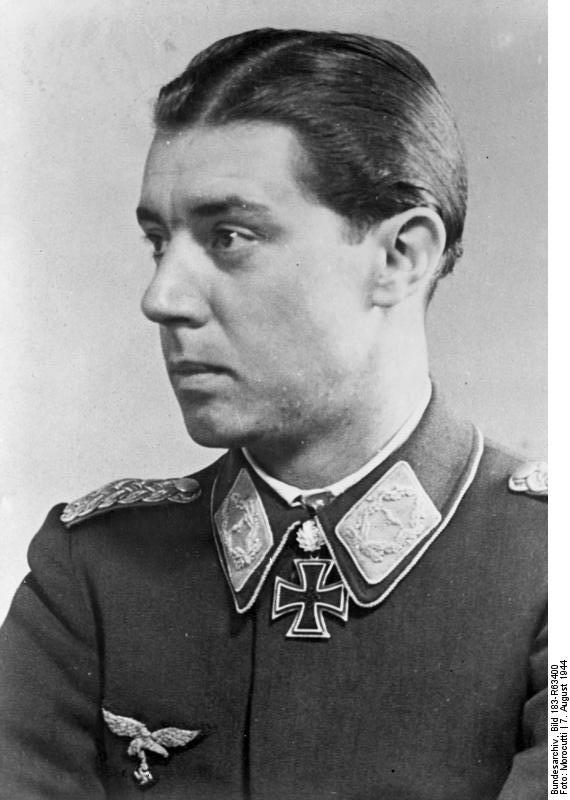
- Born: 14 November 1917; Lübeck
- Died: 26 October 2003 (aged 85); Lüdenscheid
- Military career
- Allegiance: Nazi Germany
- Branch: Luftwaffe
- Service years: 1936–1945
- Rank: Oberstleutnant (lieutenant colonel)
- Nickname: "Achim"
- Units: ZG 76 and NJG 1
- Commands: Nachtjagdgeschwader 1
- Conflicts: World War II Battle of France Battle of Britain Battle of Crete Defense of the Reich
- Awards: Knight's Cross of the Iron Cross with Oak Leaves
- Other work: Businessman

Hans-Joachim Jabs (14 November 1917 – 26 October 2003) was a German officer in the Luftwaffe during World War II. Jabs was the rare case of a pilot who found success in two distinctly different forms of aerial combat. He was one of the few pilots to obtain Experte while flying a heavy daytime fighter. Surviving the Battle of Britain, he later became one of the most successful pilots in the night fighter force. The skill sets for the two operations were completely different. Through 510 combat missions he was credited with 50 victories, 31 of them achieved at night. Following the war he became a successful businessman in the field of heavy agricultural equipment.

== Early life and training ==
Jabs was born 14 November 1917 in the city of Lübeck, Germany. He was the son of a Oberinspektor (Chief Inspector). After graduation from school and receipt of his Abitur (university entry qualification) in 1936 from the "Johanneum" in Lübeck, he completed his compulsory Reich Labour Service. At the age of 19, he began his military career in the Luftwaffe as a Fahnenjunker (Officer Cadet) on 4 December 1936.

After completing his training as a pilot at the Luftwaffe school at Wildpark-Werder, he served briefly as a bomber pilot for I. Gruppe of Kampfgeschwader 253 (I./KG 253). He served with KG 253 for two months, and then went to special training for fighter pilots. In July 1938 he completed the conversion course to fighters, and on 1 November 1938 was posted as a 1st Lieutenant and Adjutant for I. Gruppe of JG 144, flying the Messerschmitt Bf 109D. This unit was re-equipped with what was the new long range heavy fighter Messerschmitt Bf 110 and redesignated II. Gruppe of Zerstörergeschwader 76 (ZG 76—76th Destroyer Wing).

At the outset of the war no one knew with certainty how air battles in a coming conflict would be fought. The speeds of the aircraft had more than doubled since the Great War, leading many to believe that dog-fighting was a thing of the past. Most thought air combat would be a battle between bombers attacking territory and fighters defending, and that the bomber would be the key offensive weapon. Most conceded the fighters would be unable to stop the bombers. With that in mind, the Bf 110 heavy fighter had been produced. It was fast, had long range and a heavy armament.

Jabs flew the heavy fighter for all six years of the war, with Erich Weißflog serving as his radio operator, and later radar operator. In March 1940 Jabs was promoted to lieutenant. He was with ZG 76 when the Second World War began with the invasion of Poland in September 1939.

== Battle of France ==
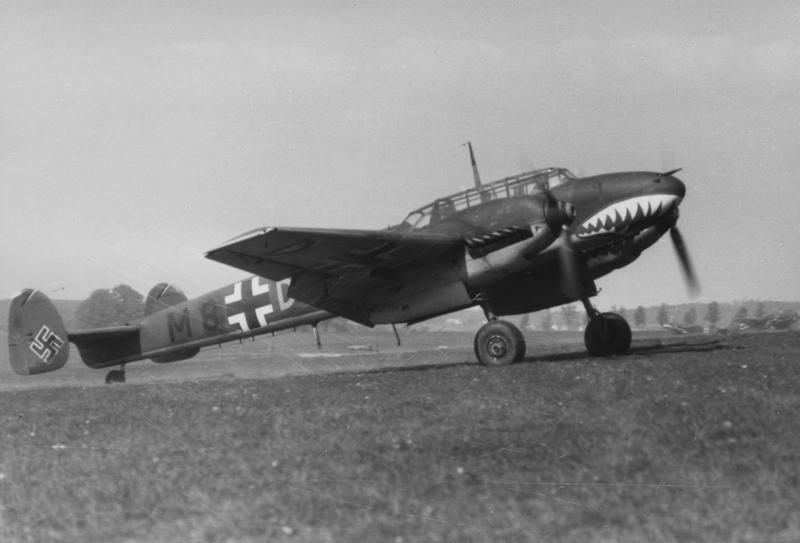
Bf 110C of ZG 76 in France 1940, in the same camouflage and "sharks mouth" nose scheme as Jabs' aircraft

As a member of II./ZG 76, Jabs operated over France and the low countries during the blitzkrieg that swept the Netherlands, Belgium and France in the spring of 1940. He was credited with his first victory on 12 May with the destruction of a French Hawk 75A of the Armee de l'air. The following day he shot down a French Morane. Jabs' method with the Bf 110 was to approach from above and dive onto his opponents, using the weight of the aircraft and its heavy forward firing guns to advantage. He declined dogfighting, attempting instead to maintain speed and height, and was conscious of the need to put distance between his aircraft and the opposing fighters when the time came. Over the next five weeks he was credited with four more, two French aircraft and two RAF Spitfires. On 15 May Jabs was awarded the Iron Cross 2nd Class (Eisernes Kreuz zweiter Klasse), and two weeks later the Iron Cross 1st Class (Eisernes Kreuz erster Klasse) on 28 May.

== Battle of Britain ==
In the summer and fall of 1940 Jabs was engaged in a series of fierce air battles over the Channel and southern England during the Battle of Britain. At the outset of the battle the twin-engined Messerschmitt Bf 110 was expected to engage in air-to-air combat while escorting the Luftwaffe bomber fleet. The plane had proved effective in the Freie Jagd role, where it could attack at speed and regain altitude. The Bf 110 was faster than the Hurricane, and nearly as fast as the Spitfire, but its greater weight limited its ability to accelerate and manoeuver. When Reichsmarschall Hermann Göring insisted the fighters stay with the bombers as a close escort, the Bf 110 was unable to take advantage of its strengths. Subsequently, Bf 110 losses mounted. Acting as an escort, the ability Jabs possessed as a heavy fighter pilot became well apparent. The Bf 110 was not capable of holding its own against British Hurricanes and Spitfires. Though losses in the heavy fighter units were mounting, Jabs managed to stay alive and still meet with success. Between 15 August and 11 September 1940 he was credited with 11 victories over the channel and southern England, bringing his total to 17.

On 30 August 1940 Staffelkapitän Heinz Nacke was injured in an air combat over England. Jabs was made Staffelkapitän of 6./ZG 76 to replace him. Heavy losses among the heavy fighter units in August and few replacements meant missions flown by Bf 110 units in September decreased, as they no longer had the numbers to fly them. In October the units were withdrawn. In this time Jabs had become one of the top scoring Zestörer pilots, with 17 victories. In recognition of his success Jabs was awarded the Knight's Cross of the Iron Cross (Ritterkreuz des Eisernen Kreuzes) on 1 October.

== Coastal patrol and the battle of Crete ==
In October 1940 Jabs' unit was transferred to Stavanger, Norway to perform coastal patrols to protect German shipping. This duty was better suited to the Bf 110, as the aircraft they would most likely face would be Blenheims or Hampdens. In the event his air group was never challenged, and the patrols soon became routine and dull. Jabs and his unit remained in Norway until the spring of the next year.

At the end of April 1941 Jabs and II. Gruppe of Zerstörergeschwader 76 were transferred from the German Bight to the Balkans to support the invasion of Crete. They joined two other Zerstörer groups that were already in theater, I. and II. Gruppe of Zerstörergeschwader 26. The battle over Crete and the surrounding waters began 20 May 1941, and ran until 1 June 1941. At this point of the war the Bf 110 was found most useful in the ground attack role. Jabs led his Staffel over Crete attacking ground targets and Allied shipping. During this time no opportunity presented to Jabs to engage in aerial combat.

An increasing threat of night attacks on the territory of the Third Reich prompted the Luftwaffe high command to strengthen relevant defenses. As a result, by the end of the year, 6./ZG 76 was taken off day operations, transferred to the Netherlands, re-designated 9. Staffel of Nachtjagdgeschwader 3 (NJG 3), and employed in night operations.

== The night fighter force ==
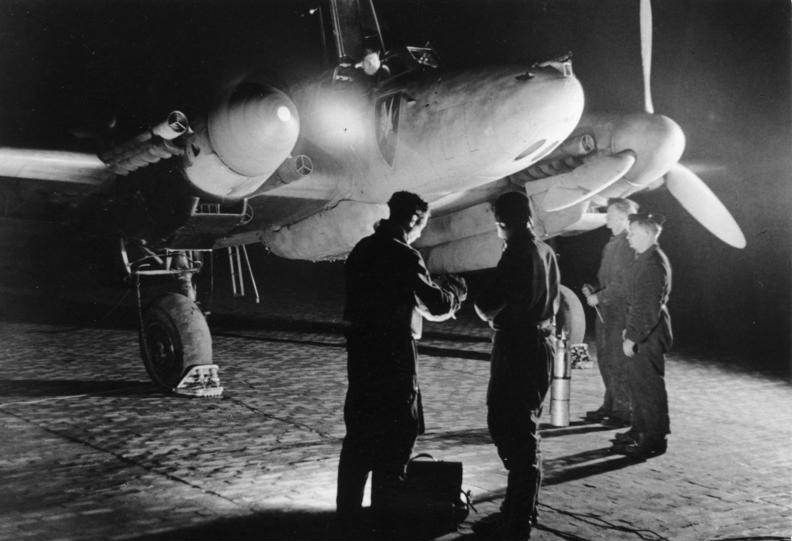
Bf 110 in Nightfighter role, 1943

As Bomber Command's nighttime bombing campaign against German industry gathered strength, a night fighter force was developed by Wolfgang Falck and Josef Kammhuber. The force was in need of experienced pilots to lead it against the increasing RAF attacks. In November 1941, after training for two months on night fighter techniques, the now Hauptmann Jabs officially was transferred to the night fighter force, as Staffelkapitän of 9. Staffel of NJG 3. Jabs started operational night sorties in November. Assigned to the station in Hamburg, his group was placed there to defend the harbor and the German Navy's military facilities.

The primary difficulty in night fighting was being able to locate another aircraft in the dark of night. In the British experience, Bomber Command aircraft would fly for hours on raids involving several hundred aircraft, and never see another airplane during the entire mission. If a German night fighter did sight a British bomber, he had to approach without being detected. If seen by the rear gunner the plane would evade, and it was almost impossible to find it again or attack it with any chance of success. Experienced night fighter pilots would move on and look for another target. Frustrated by these difficulties, Jabs did not make a successful attack until seven months later, on the night of the 25/26 June 1942.

=== Channel Dash ===
In February 1942 the Kriegsmarine was ordered to move its capital ships from Brest to German waters, to be in a position to intervene in a feared invasion of German occupied Norway. The Luftwaffe's Adolf Galland was given responsibility to provide air cover for the Scharnhorst-class battleships Scharnhorst and Gneisenau, and the heavy cruiser Prinz Eugen. Operation Donnerkeil (Operation Thunderbolt), as the German air-cover plan was named, called for an aircover to be in place before dawn. Jab's gruppe was to place 30 Bf 110 night fighters over the fleet from before dawn till they were relieved by the Fw 190s of JG 2. The German fleet slipped out of Brest after darkness fell on 11 February, and were sailing their way up the channel the following morning. Jabs and his gruppe arrived over the fleet in the night and completed their portion of the mission without incident. With the successful completion of the mission Jabs' unit returned to the Netherlands and the night fighter battle.

== Air war over the Netherlands ==
On 1 November 1942 Jabs was appointed Staffelkapitän of 11./NJG 1, where he would become friends with Helmut Lent, Heinz-Wolfgang Schnaufer, Günther Radusch and Martin Drewes. By the end of the year he had accumulated four victories as a nightfighter. With the addition of FuG 202 Lichtenstein radar Jabs began having greater success locating British bombers. He became adept at the orthodox night fighter attack method of von unten hinten, or from under and behind. This involved locating a weaving bomber and then approaching low and to the rear, hopefully avoiding being sighted by the bomber's rear gunner. When he had closed adequately he would assume a climbing attitude and fire at the bomber's undercarriage.

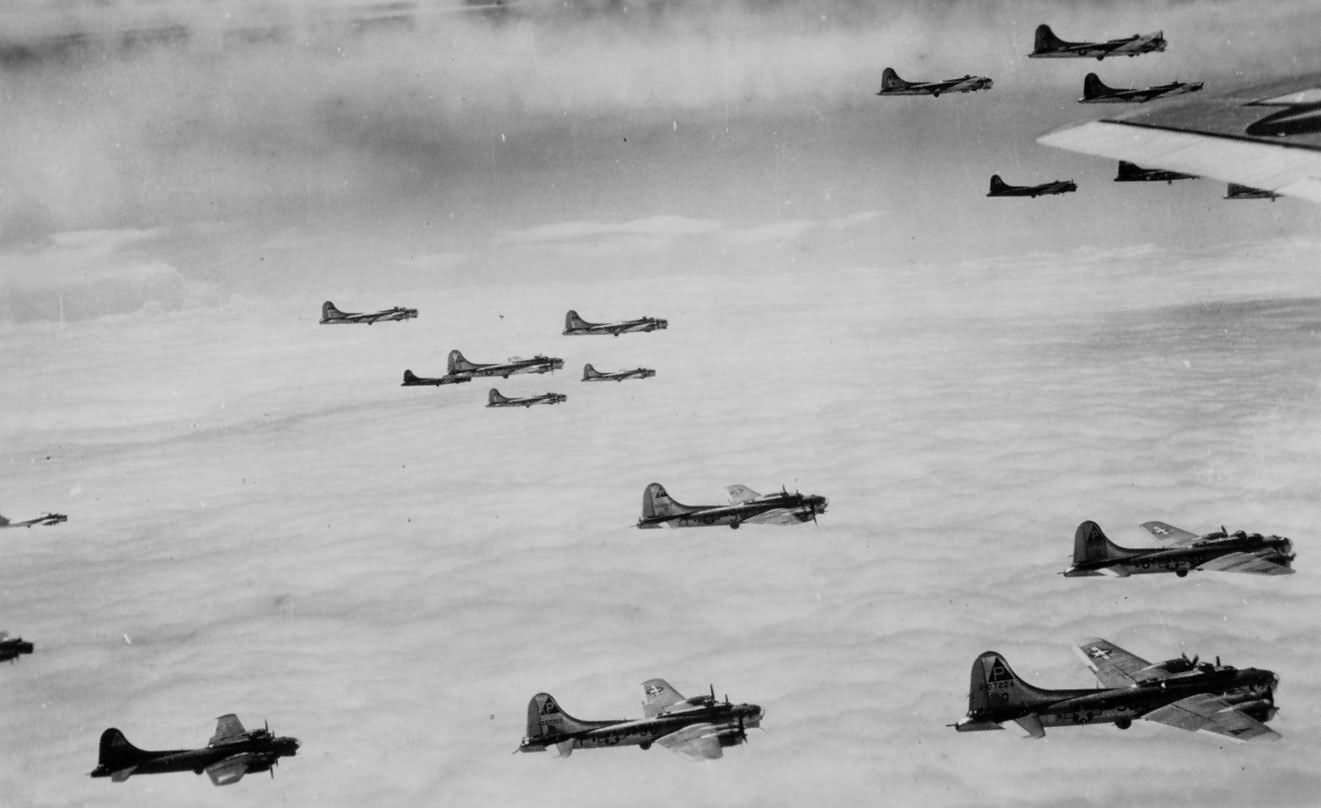
B-17 box formation

In January 1943 the Eighth Air Force began taking their daylight operations into Germany. Beyond the range of fighter escort, Bomber Command discouraged the idea, but the Eighth believed their aircraft would be able to fight their way through to the target. The initial raid was against Wilhelmshaven. The first attack on 27 January was conducted with 60 B-17s, and was met by resistance from JG-1. The B-17s brushed the defenses aside and delivered their loads on Wilhelmshaven, while suffering the loss of 3 aircraft. Göring insisted that all aircraft, including the night fighter force, would be put into the air to resist these attacks against Germany. The second raid 4 February was mounted against the marshaling yards at Hamm. Poor weather was a problem, and the mission was diverted to the industrial area of Emden. JG 1 again responded, but this time they were joined by Jabs and his gruppe. Neither German fighter unit possessed the techniques of attack developed in northern France by JG 2 and JG 26, and had a difficult time engaging the bombers. Official Luftwaffe doctrine was to attack bombers from the rear and above. Against the heavily gunned B-17s, Jabs and his crews knew such attacks were suicidal. Several attacks from the beam were made, and eventually a break in the formation opened a gap which Jabs and his wingman took advantage of. Getting into the formation both made head on attacks and were each credited with the destruction of a B-17. Overall 5 B-17s were lost on the mission, one due to a mid-air collision with a Fw 190, but of the 8 aircraft Jabs' gruppe put up, all 8 suffered significant damage. In battles against the 8th Air Force, losses in the night fighter force among Bf 110s mounted quickly. The special skills of the night fighters took considerable time to develop. Night fighter commanders and crews resented being sent on these missions, and felt it extremely wasteful. In two months the night fighters finally were withdrawn from the day battle.

To improve his destructive power Jabs had his aircraft's forward armament replaced, changing from the two 20 mm cannons and four MG 17 machine-guns to a pair of 30 mm cannons. The heavier gun was more effective against Allied heavy bombers. He was credited with 3 bombers on the night of 19 February. He added another score in April 1943, bringing his total to 28.

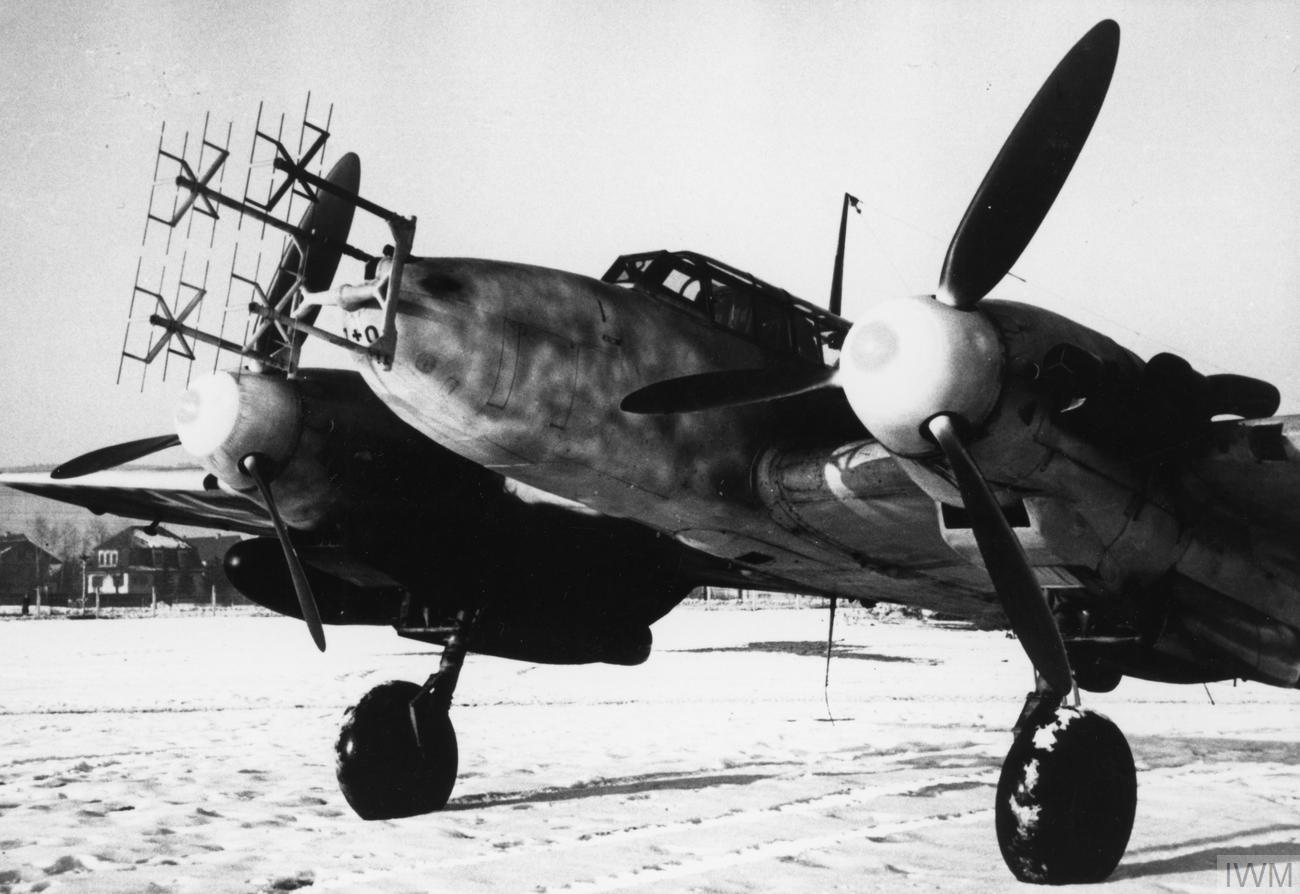
Bf 110G equipped with the FuG 202 Lichtenstein airborne interception radar

Jabs had a second armament modification made a few months later. Night fighter pilots had been asked to identify their targets before firing upon them to reduce friendly fire accidents. To their surprise, the night fighter pilots discovered they could fly below a heavy British bomber and remain out of sight and undetected. Soon pilots were asking for upward firing guns to be mounted in their aircraft. These modifications were largely done in the field. Jabs had a pair of upward firing 20 mm cannons mounted to his Bf 110. If he could locate the bomber he would approach from below, matching the weaving movement of the bomber. With the target confirmed Jabs would fire from below, aiming for the fuel cells in the right wing root between the fuselage and the inboard engine. This gun mounting they called Schräge Musik or slanting music. The bombers shot down in this manner never saw their attacker. Its use remained unknown to Bomber Command for over a year. It was soon the preferred method of attack. Jabs scored 7 kills in June, bringing his total to 35. By the end of August he had reached 40. On 31 August 1943, he was awarded the German Cross in Gold (Deutsches Kreuz in Gold).

From the fall of 1943 through the spring of 1944 the battle for the night skies over Germany swung to the night fighters. Harris hoped to end the war by destroying Berlin. It was his last opportunity to do so before the Allied land forces would intervene in what could be a very costly land battle. Throughout that winter Harris attempted to win the Battle of Berlin. During this period Jabs was frustrated with his inability to locate and track any bombers, and he reported no victories during this time. The Nuremberg raid on 30/31 March 1944 was the last mission flown in the battle for Berlin. On 1 April Bomber Command was placed under the control of Eisenhower and SHAEF, and the force was turned to France to begin air preparations for the invasion.

On 1 March 1944 Jabs was made the Geschwaderkommodore of NJG 1, replacing Werner Streib, who had been made Inspector of Night Fighters. Three weeks later, on 24 March 1944, Jabs was awarded the Knight's Cross of the Iron Cross with Oak Leaves (Ritterkreuz des Eisernen Kreuzes mit Eichenlaub). The presentation was made by Adolf Hitler at the Berghof, Hitler's residence in the Obersalzberg of the Bavarian Alps, on 4 April 1944. Also present at the award ceremony were Gerhard Barkhorn, for the Swords to his Knight's Cross, and Erich Hartmann, Walter Krupinski, Kurt Bühligen, Horst Ademeit, Reinhard Seiler, Dr. Maximilian Otte, Bernhard Jope and Hansgeorg Bätcher from the bomber force, and the Flak officer Fritz Petersen, all destined to receive the Oak Leaves.

On 29 April 1944 Jabs paid a visit to fellow night fighter pilot Heinz-Wolfgang Schnaufer and his Gruppe at St. Trond Belgium. In mid-afternoon through cloudy and foggy skies Jabs made the short trip back to his home base at Deelen. As Jabs approached Deelen he could see a small group of single engine fighters low over the airfield, which he took to be German. The aircraft, in fact, were from No. 132 Squadron RAF, led by Squadron Leader Geoffrey Page, who had taken a flight of Spitfires on a low level mission looking for enemy aircraft. The approaching twin engine fighter was just what Page was looking for. As Jabs continued his approach he saw the aircraft turn toward him. Realizing his mistake, he flew toward his attackers and through some cloud. Emerging on the other side he found himself approaching head on with the Spitfire of New Zealander John Caulton. As the two aircraft rapidly closed both began firing, but Jabs' twin 30 mm cannon took effect first, ripping open the Spitfire's drop tank and putting hits on the engine and wing. Flying past, the undamaged Spitfires regrouped and turned to make another attack. Jabs attempted to reach the cover of his airfield. As the Spitfires closed from behind, Jabs surprised them by turning back into them again. Both sides were firing as they closed. For a brief moment one of the Spitfires was caught by the heavy forward guns of the Bf 110. It was engulfed in fire and crashed to earth. Jabs' aircraft had also taken several hits and was losing power in one of the engines. He made an abrupt hard landing, and with the aircraft still rolling he and the crew scrambled for cover while the airfield's Flak batteries attempted to drive off the attackers. Despite the fire from the field's defenses, the Spitfires strafed the Bf 110, setting it ablaze.

As Caulton headed west in his damaged Spitfire a large gash opened on the wing. Soon he found his engine was running rough. He lost oil pressure, and as the engine overheated it soon seized up. Caulton had no choice but to put the aircraft down. He did so in a field about 30 miles away from the airfield at Deelen. Of the other four Spitfires that returned to England, all had suffered damage, either from Jabs or the Flak guns.

After the air battle Jabs drove over to the site of Caulton's crash and inspected the stricken Spitfire. Then he and his crew came to the building where Caulton was being held. The two exchanged greetings, and Jabs, who spoke English, asked "Were you flying the Spitfire?" "Yes" Caulton replied. "Well, I was flying the other." They spoke together for a short time, and Caulton asked Jabs for a small signed note as a mark of their meeting. Jabs did so, adding a brief instruction that Caulton was to be allowed to keep it.

== End of the war ==
Six weeks later the Allied invasion of Europe was a signal of the end of the German night fighter force. Airfields in the Low Countries and France came under increasing air attack, both by day and by night. Shortages of fuel became severe. The toll exacted by Mosquito intruder missions limited the effectiveness of the night fighter as well. The German night fighter force lost 54 aircraft and crews in October 1944, from interdictions and accidents. One such loss was Helmut Lent, who on 5 October was flying his Ju 88G-6 nightfighter from Stade to Nordborchen to meet with Jabs to discuss operational matters. During his landing approach he lost power in his left engine. The left wing stalled and dipped. Lent was unable to avoid high voltage cables and crashed into the ground. All four men aboard subsequently died from their injuries. Jabs served in the honour guard at Lent's funeral.

By October 1944 the fuel crisis was severe enough that only Experten were allowed to fly missions. On 1 November 1944 Jabs was promoted to Oberstleutnant (lieutenant colonel). The last two victories Jabs was credited with against Bomber Command were made on the evening of 20/21 February 1945 when he brought down a pair of Lancasters. Jabs remained the commanding officer of NJG 1 through the end of the war. At the completion of his career he had been credited with 50 victories, 22 of these against day fighters, all achieved while flying the Bf 110.

== Life after the war ==
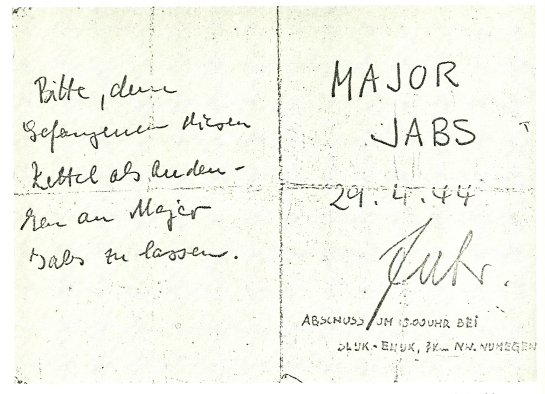
Image of the hand written note by Jabs for Caulton

In May 1945 Jabs was interred as a prisoner of war and held by the British for a year. Upon being released he moved to Westphalia where he developed the Lister agricultural equipment business. He was successful in this work. He also became involved in veterans organizations, and was made vice-president of the Gemeinschaft der Jagdflieger or Association of Armed Forces Airmen, a veteran's organization founded in 1952 by former officers of the Luftwaffe to help fellow officers returning to Germany.

After the war Jabs met a number of his former adversaries, including two from his encounter of 29 April 1944, Geoffrey Page and John Caulton. Jabs met Page in the 1950s at a gathering of former fighter pilots in Munich. The two discussed their encounter and formed a friendship. In the 1960s Kiwi native and former Pilot Officer John Caulton read a book Jabs had contributed to, and was intrigued as to whether this was the same man who had given him the note in Belgium. When his daughter traveled to the UK in 1970, he asked her to see if she could track Jabs down. She was successful, and in 1972 the two former adversaries met, and established a friendship. The friendship was long standing, with Caulton and Jabs meeting regularly every 3 to 4 years until Jabs' death in 2003.

== Summary of career ==
=== Aerial victory claims ===
According to US historian David T. Zabecki, Jabs was credited with 50 aerial victories. Foreman, Parry and Mathews, authors of Luftwaffe Night Fighter Claims 1939 – 1945, researched the German Federal Archives and found records for 33 nocturnal victory claims. Mathews and Foreman also published Luftwaffe Aces — Biographies and Victory Claims, listing Jabs with 48 claims, including 17 as a Zerstörer pilot and one four-engined bomber in daylight, plus two further unconfirmed claims and two by his air gunner.

Chronicle of aerial victories
This and the – (dash) indicates unwitnessed aerial victory claims for which Jabs did not receive credit. This along with the * (asterisk) indicates that the aircraft was shot down by Jabs' air gunner.
Claim (total)	Claim (nocturnal)	Date	Time	Type	Location	Serial No./Squadron No.
– 6. Staffel of Zerstörergeschwader 76 –
1		12 May 1940	07:15	Hawk 75	Namur	
2		13 May 1940	18:50	M.S.406		
3		15 May 1940	14:25	M.S.406	west of Laon	
*		15 May 1940	—	M.S.406	west of Laon	
4		29 May 1940	14:05	Spitfire		
5		29 May 1940	14:10	Spitfire	vicinity of Dunkirk	
6		7 June 1940	06:20	M.S.406		
7		15 August 1940	18:35	Spitfire		
8		15 August 1940	18:50	Hurricane		
*		15 August 1940	—	Spitfire	south of Portland-Swanage	
9		30 August 1940	13:00	Hurricane		
10		31 August 1940	09:54	Spitfire		
11		1 September 1940	14:40	Spitfire	Tonbridge	
12		1 September 1940	14:45	Hurricane	Tonbridge	
13		1 September 1940	14:55	Hurricane	Tonbridge	
14		4 September 1940	14:07	Spitfire		
15		4 September 1940	14:20	Hurricane	Tonbridge	
16		7 September 1940	19:20	Spitfire	London	
17		11 September 1940	17:20	Spitfire	south of London	
– 9. Staffel of Nachtjagdgeschwader 3 –
—	1	25/26 June 1942	—	Stirling		
—	2	26/27 July 1942	—	Wellington		
– 11. Staffel of Nachtjagdgeschwader 1 –
18	3	17 December 1942	22:40	Halifax	west of Egmont	
19	4	17 December 1942	22:54	Stirling	20 km (12 mi) southwest of Amsterdam	
20	5	8 January 1943	22:15	Halifax	10 km (6.2 mi) northwest of Vlieland	W7857/No. 419 Squadron RAF
21	6	17 January 1943	22:17	Stirling	10 km (6.2 mi) north of Ameland	
22	7	4 February 1943	12:51	B-17	50 km (31 mi) northwest of Texel	
23	8	19 February 1943	21:00	Stirling	10 km (6.2 mi) north of Ameland	
24	9	19 February 1943	21:18	Stirling	10 km (6.2 mi) northwest of Schiermonnikoog	
25	10	19 February 1943	21:44	Stirling	50 km (31 mi) north of Terschelling	
26	11	9 April 1943	23:56	Lancaster	40 km (25 mi) west of Alkmaar	
27	12	13 June 1943	02:39	Lancaster	10 km (6.2 mi) west of Zandvoort	ED652/No. 115 Squadron RAF
28	13	13 June 1943	03:04	Lancaster	50 km (31 mi) west of Zandvoort	
29	14	22 June 1943	02:44	Stirling	8 km (5.0 mi) west-southwest of Hoorn	
30	15	23 June 1943	02:19	Stirling	12 km (7.5 mi) northwest of Bergen	
31	16	26 June 1943	02:35	Halifax	northwest of Alkmaar	
32	17	26 June 1943	02:40	Halifax	EK 5-8	
33	18	26 June 1943	02:56	Lancaster	50 km (31 mi) west-northwest of Den Helder	
34	19	28 July 1943	02:50	Halifax	10 km (6.2 mi) west of Vlieland	
– Stab IV. Gruppe of Nachtjagdgeschwader 1 –
35	20	2 August 1943	03:10	Halifax	3 km (1.9 mi) northwest of Hoorn	
36	21	2 August 1943	03:29	Stirling	22 km (14 mi) west of Harlingen	EH928/No. 75 Squadron RAF
37	22	2 August 1943	03:52	Stirling	20 km (12 mi) northwest of Terschelling	
38	23	24 August 1943	02:14	Stirling	10 km (6.2 mi) south of Enkhuizen	
39	24	18 October 1943	20:07	Lancaster	35 km (22 mi) northeast of Diepholz	
40	25	3 November 1943	19:34	Lancaster	Gunzdorf	
41	26	3 November 1943	19:55	Halifax	Niedermüssen	
– Stab of Nachtjagdgeschwader 1 –
42	27	28 April 1944	02:09	Lancaster	2 km (1.2 mi) southeast of Diest	
43	28	28 April 1944	02:25	Halifax	Rotterdam	
44	29	29 April 1944	15:15	Spitfire	3 km (1.9 mi) south of Valburg	
45	30	29 April 1944	15:15	Spitfire	6 km (3.7 mi) south of Apeldoorn	
46	31	21/22 January 1945	—	Lancaster		
47	32	20/21 February 1945	—	Lancaster		
48	33	20/21 February 1945	—	Lancaster		

=== Awards ===
- Iron Cross (1939)
  - 2nd Class (15 May 1940)
  - 1st Class (28 May 1940)
- Honour Goblet of the Luftwaffe on 29 March 1943 as Hauptmann and Staffelkapitän (Note: According to Obermaier on 23 March 1943.)
- "Crete" Cuffband (21 May 1943)
- German Cross in Gold on 31 August 1943 as Hauptmann in the 11./Nachtjagdgeschwader 1
- Front Flying Clasp of the Luftwaffe in Gold with Pennant (18 May 1944)
- Knight's Cross of the Iron Cross with Oak Leaves
  - Knight's Cross on 1 October 1940 as Oberleutnant and pilot and Staffel officer in the 2./Zerstörergeschwader 76
  - 430th Oak Leaves on 24 March 1944 as Hauptmann and Gruppenkommandeur of the IV./Nachtjagdgeschwader 1

=== Promotions ===
1 September 1938:	Leutnant (second lieutenant)
1 August 1940:	Oberleutnant (first lieutenant)
1 March 1943:	Hauptmann (captain)
1 January 1944:	Major (major)
1 November 1944:	Oberstleutnant (lieutenant colonel)

== Notes ==
Military offices
Preceded by Oberst Werner Streib	Commander of Nachtjagdgeschwader 1 March 1944 – 8 May 1945	Succeeded by none
