= Taucha, Saxony-Anhalt =

Taucha
- Stadtteil of Hohenmölsen
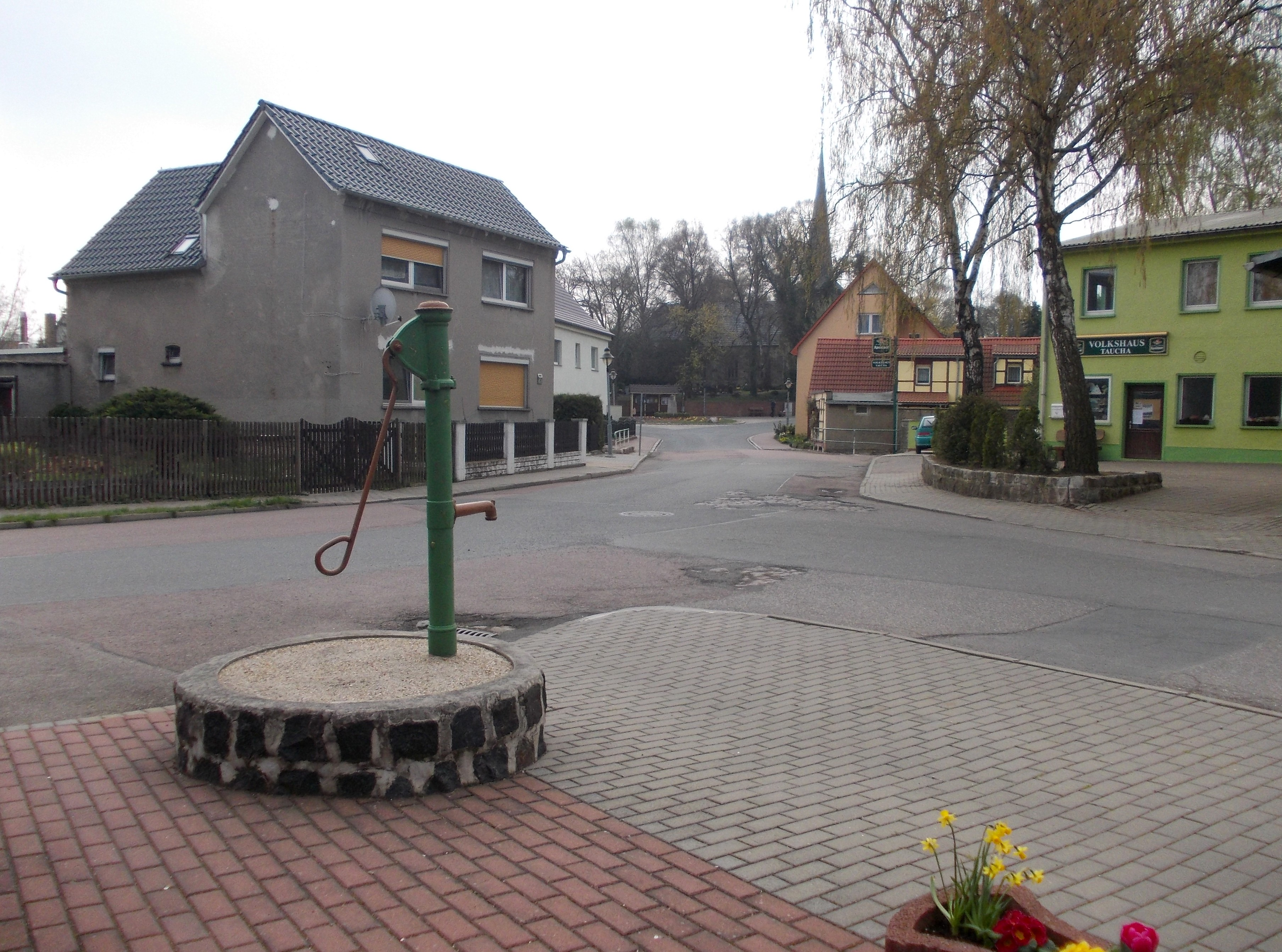
- Center of the village
- Interactive map of Taucha
- Location within Germany Location within Saxony-Anhalt
- Coordinates: 51°11′36″N 12°4′45″E
- Country: Germany
- State: Saxony-Anhalt
- District: Burgenlandkreis
- Town: Hohenmölsen

Area
  - Total: 5.27 km^{2} (2.03 sq mi)
- Elevation: 142 m (466 ft)

Population (2006-12-31)
  - Total: 641
  - Density: 122/km^{2} (315/sq mi)
- Time zone: UTC+01:00 (CET)
  - Summer (DST): UTC+02:00 (CEST)
- Postal codes: 06679
- Dialling codes: 034441
- Vehicle registration: BLK

Taucha is a village and a former municipality in the Burgenlandkreis district, in Saxony-Anhalt, Germany.

Since 1 January 2010, it is part of the town Hohenmölsen.
