= Hohenmölsen =

- Town
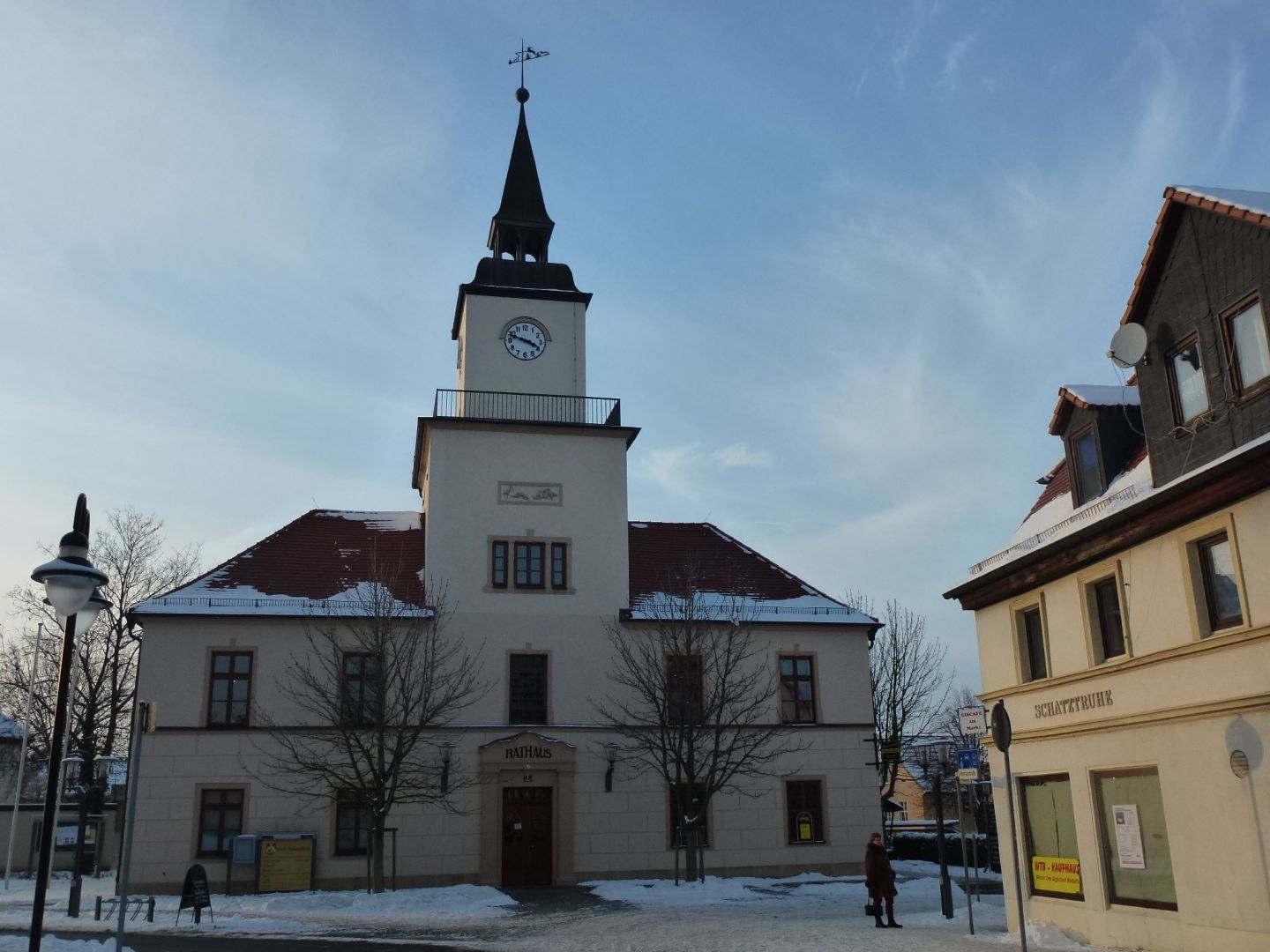
- Town hall

- Coat of arms

- Location of Hohenmölsen within Burgenlandkreis district
- Interactive map of Hohenmölsen
- Location within Germany Location within Saxony-Anhalt
- Coordinates: 51°9′23″N 12°5′53″E
- Country: Germany
- State: Saxony-Anhalt
- District: Burgenlandkreis
- Subdivisions: 6

Government
  - Mayor (2018–25): Andy Haugk (Ind.)

Area
  - Total: 75.31 km^{2} (29.08 sq mi)
- Elevation: 149 m (489 ft)

Population (2025-12-31)
  - Total: 9,074
  - Density: 120.5/km^{2} (312.1/sq mi)
- Time zone: UTC+01:00 (CET)
  - Summer (DST): UTC+02:00 (CEST)
- Postal codes: 06679
- Dialling codes: 034441
- Vehicle registration: BLK, HHM
- Website: www.stadt-hohenmoelsen.de

Hohenmölsen (German pronunciation: [ˌhoːənˈmøːlzn̩]) is a town in the Burgenlandkreis district, in Saxony-Anhalt, Germany. It is situated approximately 10 km southeast of Weißenfels, and 27 km southwest of Leipzig. The town Hohenmölsen consists of Hohenmölsen proper and the Ortschaften (municipal divisions) Granschütz, Taucha, Webau, Werschen and Zembschen.

== History ==
The Battle on the Elster, the third and last battle between the Salian king Henry IV of Germany and anti-king Rudolf of Rheinfelden, was fought on October 14, 1080 near Hohenmölsen on the White Elster river. In the year of 1091 the burgward "Melsin villa" (Milzin) was first mentioned in a document. In 1284 the city got market rights. There were two major fires in 1558 and 1578, which almost completely destroyed the city and in the Thirty Years´ War the whole city except one house was destroyed.

In the 19th century brown coal was found in Hohenmölsen, which helped the city to gain prosperity. Furthermore it helped the city at getting electric lights in 1912. With the founding of the GDR, the mining in the area of Hohenmölsen reached a new dimension. Neighboring cities, such as Mutschau, Köttichau, Döbris, Queisau, Steingrimma and Dobergast were devastated and the residents were resettled to the new districts "Hohenmölsen-Süd" and "Hohenmölsen-Nord", which has the increase of the population from the 1950s as a consequence. To this day brown coal is being mined near the city in the Braunkohletagebau Profen.

=== Population development ===
year	1680	1905	1990	1995	2000	2005	2008	2019
Population	ca. 300	3,140	10,673	11,499	10,673	9,681	9,125	9,717

=== Incorporations ===
Villages, which were incorporated to Hohenmölsen with their incorporation date:

Village	Incorporation Date
Aupitz	1 July 1950 to Granschütz
Granschütz	1 January 2010
Großgrimma	1 July 1998
Jaucha	1 July 1950
Mutschau	1 December 1962
Oberwerschen	
Rössuln	1 July 1950 to Webau
Taucha	1 January 2010
Wählitz	1 July 1950 to Webau
Webau	1 January 2003
Werschen	1 January 2003
Zembschen	9 May 2002
Zetzsch	1931

== Politics ==
=== Mayor ===
Since 2011 the full-time mayor of Hohenmölsen is Andy Haugk, who belongs to the electoral group "Aktives Hohenmölsener Land" (AHL).

== Culture and Sights ==
The town centre is dominated by three buildings: The church tower, water tower and the tower of the town hall. Through that the city is often called the "Stadt der drei Türme" - City of the three towers.

Hohenmölsen has two churches:

- The Protestant church "St. Petri"
- The catholic church "St. Marien"
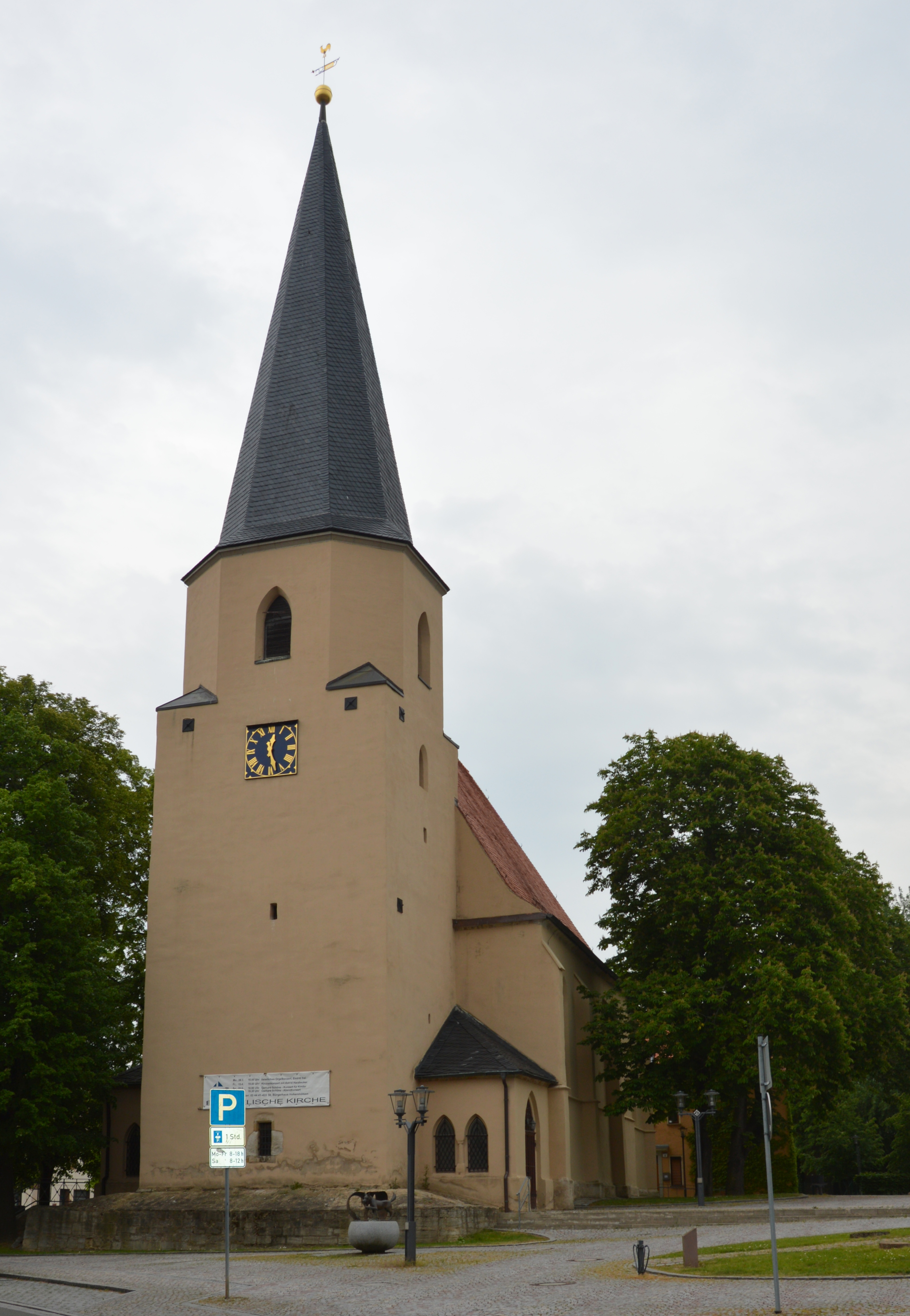
Tower of the St. Petri Church

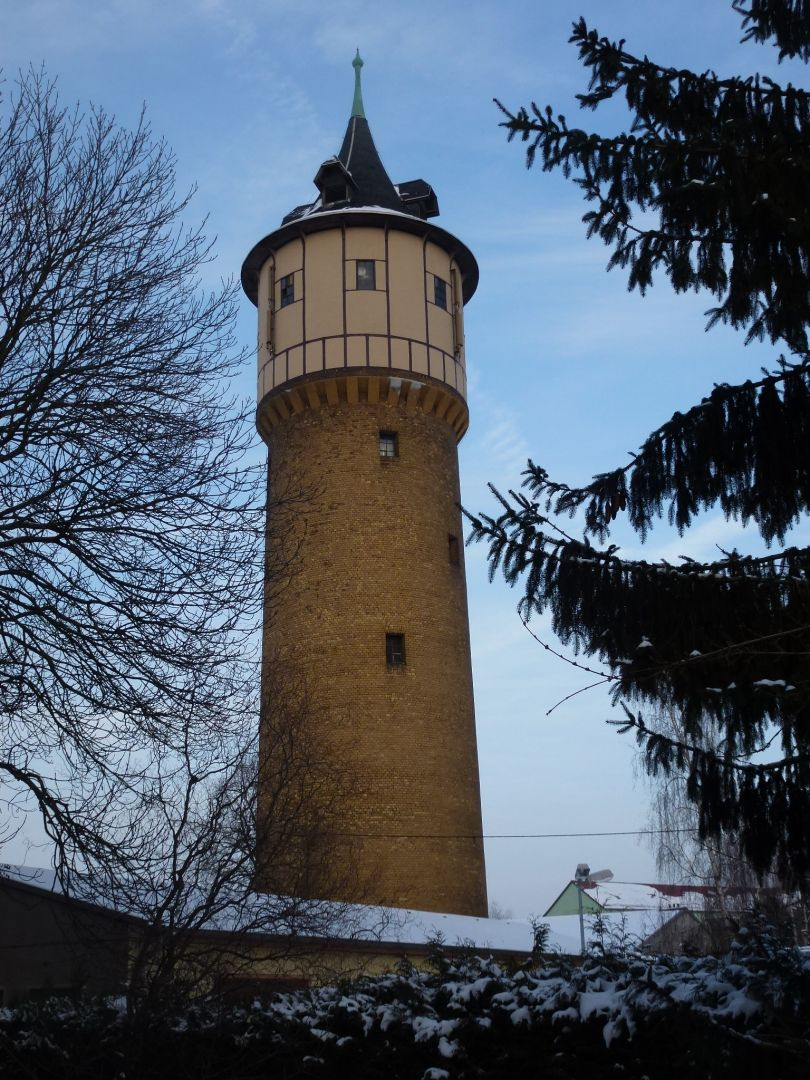
Water tower

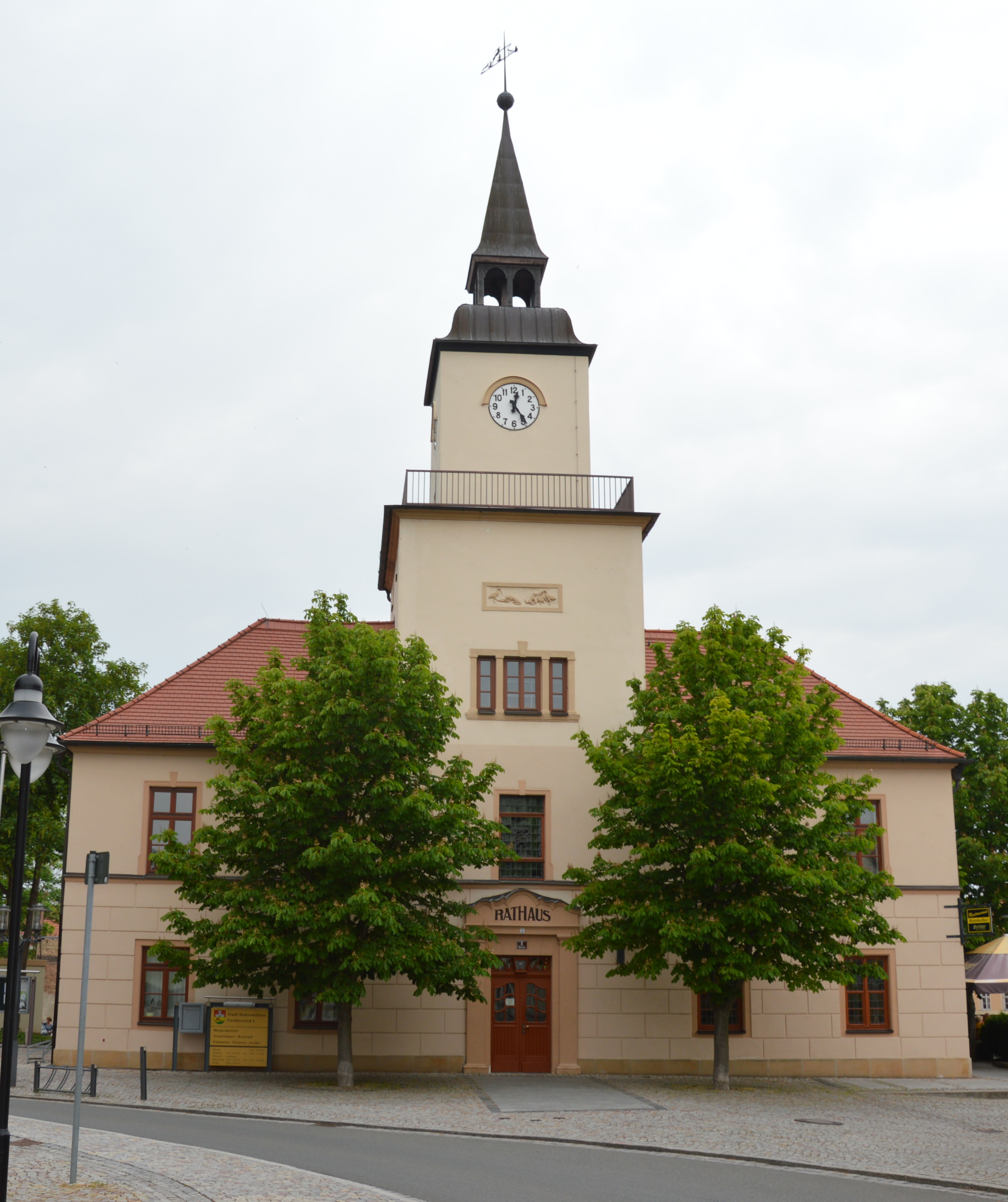
Town Hall

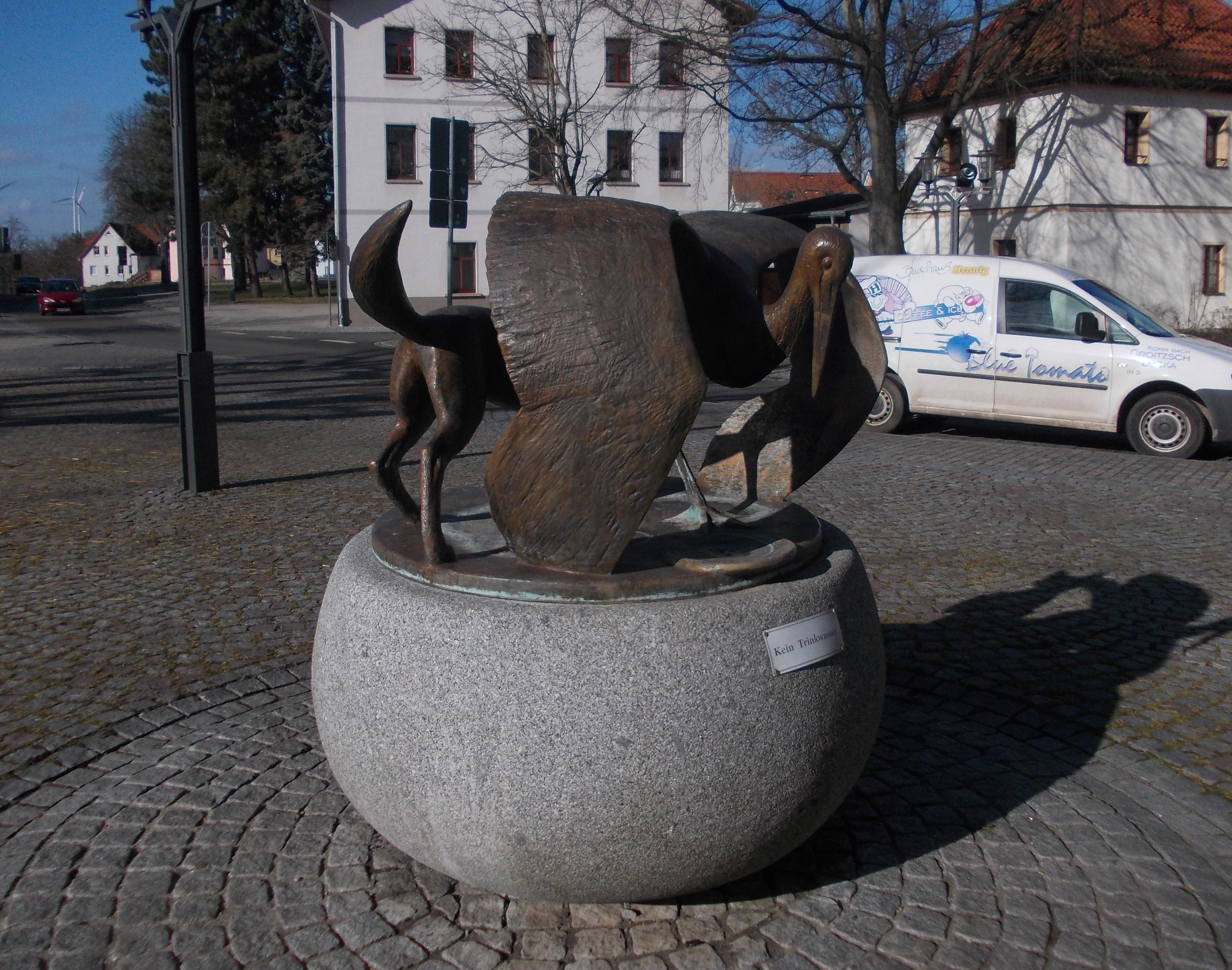
Fountain Sculpture with the Fox and the Stork

The landmark of the city is the fable The Fox and the Stork by Aesop. It can be found in different places in the city, for example on the lanterns in the city centre, a fountain sculpture on the "Altmarkt" and on the side of the town hall tower.

=== Memorials ===
- Memorial for General Heinrich August von Helldorff at the Altmarkt
- Memorial stone for the victims of fascism from 1949
- Two memorial stones in the cemetery in memory of 20 killed Red Army Soldiers and 14 victims of forced labour who were brought to Germany during the Second World War to do forced labour in the mines in Hohenmölsen
- Relief for the antifascistic miner and district leader of the Communist Party of Germany who died in a concentration camp in 1944
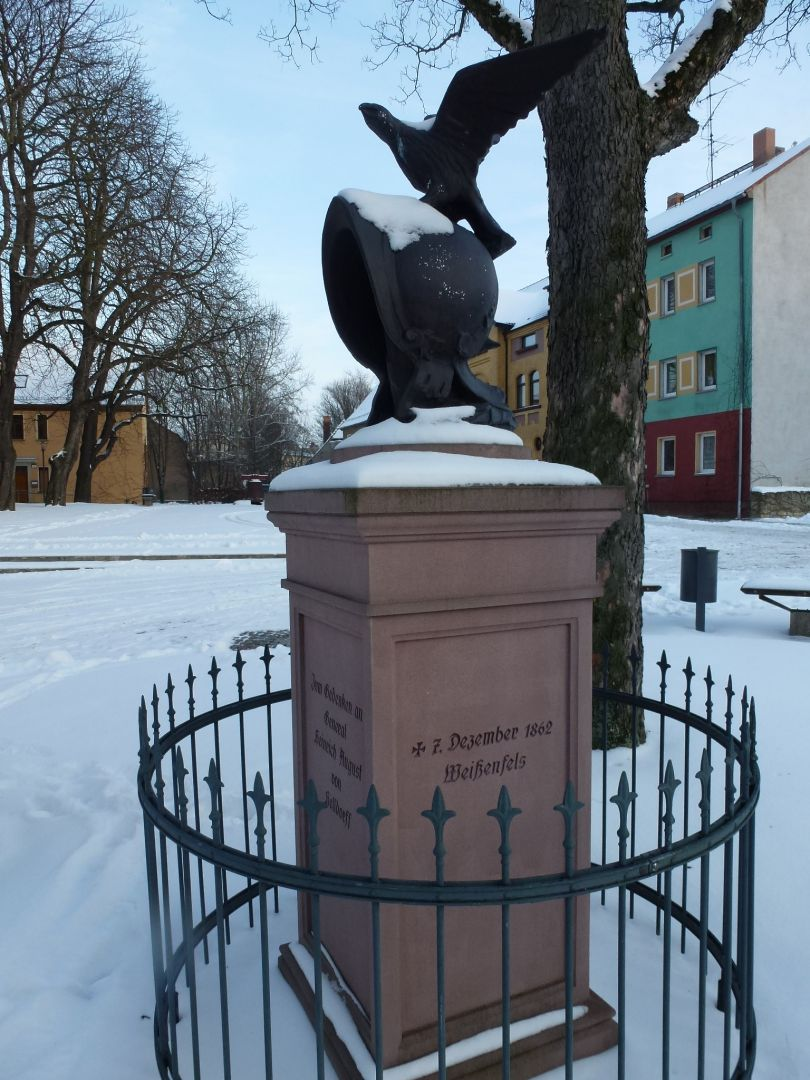
Memorial for Heinrich August von Helldorff

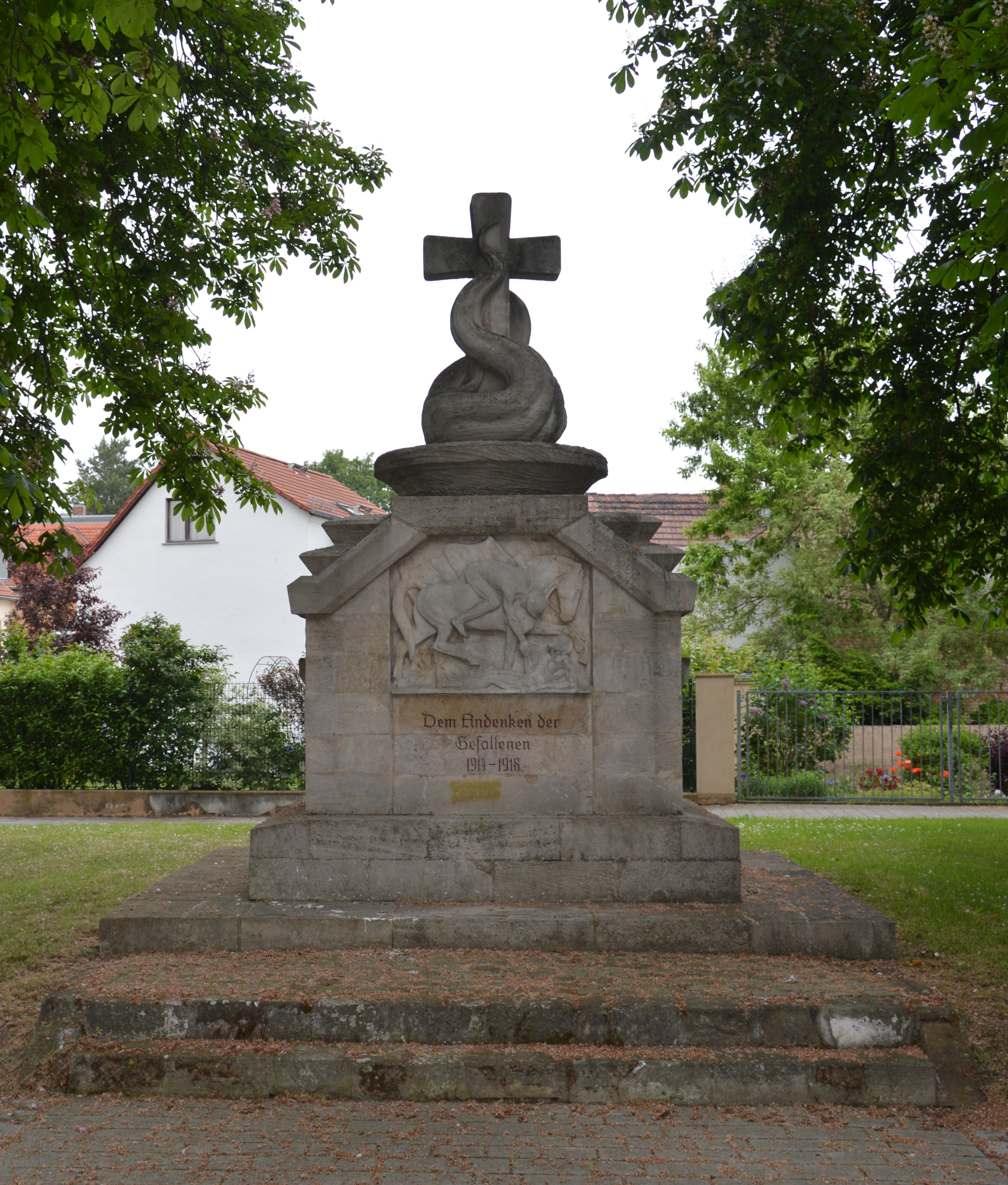

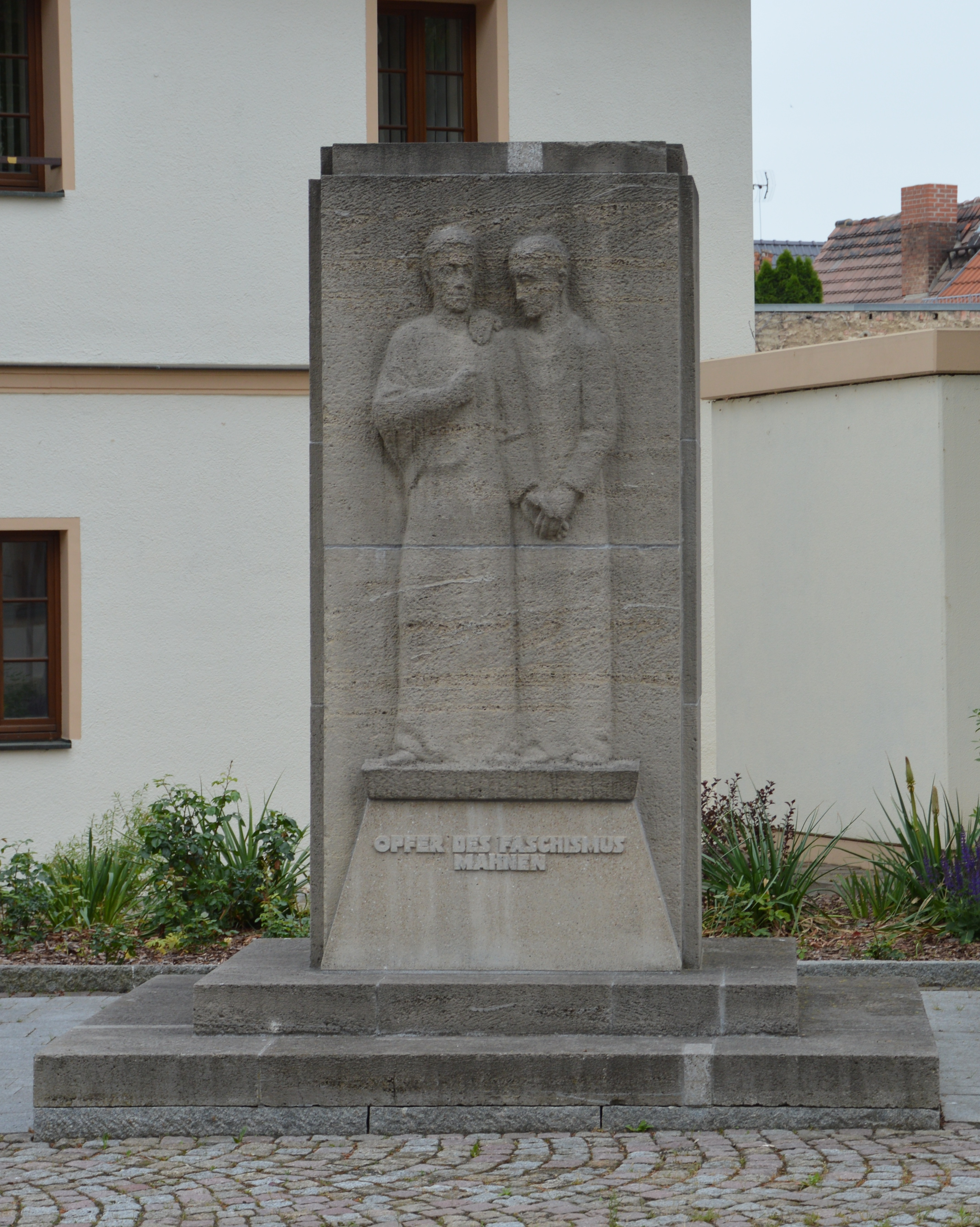
Memorial for the victims of fascism

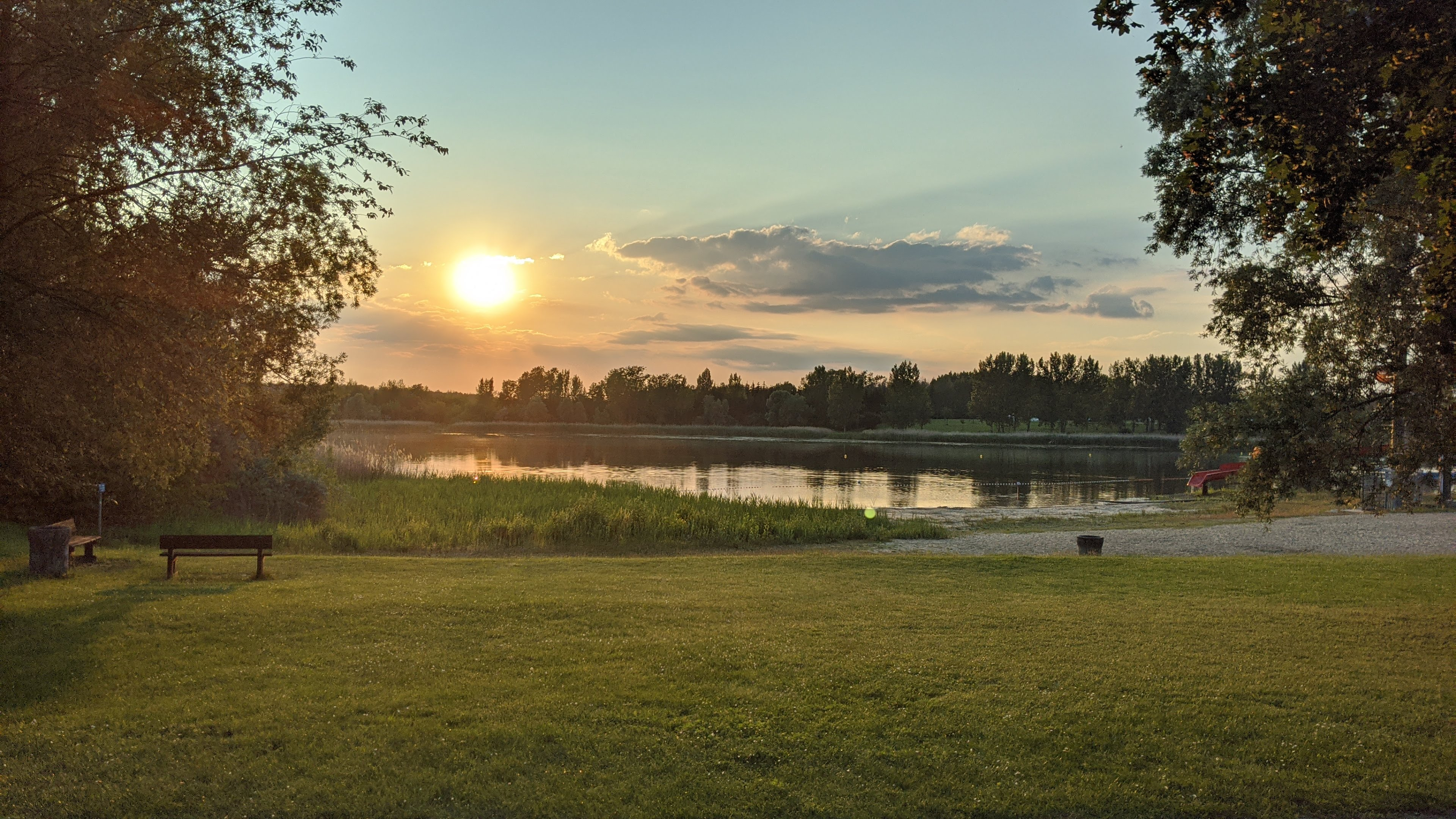
Mondsee

=== Local Recreation ===
The Mondsee is a lake 3 km southeast of Hohenmölsen. It is a former opencast mine, which has been revegetated.

=== Regular events ===
- The "Hohenmölser Herbstmarkt" is a traditional medieval market

== Economy and infrastructure ==
=== Large employers ===
The largest employers in Hohenmölsen are the MIBRAG and the AGCO Group.

The Mitteldeutsche Braunkohlegesellschaft (MIBRAG) operates the power plant in Wählitz and the opencast mine in Profen.

AGCO bought the former barracks in Hohenmölsen in 2009 and has invested over 35 Million Euros into the location. Over 330 employees manufacture the Fendt Katana 65 and 85 forage harvester and the Rogator 300 and 600 field sprayer on site. Furthermore they produce components for their tractor production.

=== Public institutions ===
The Asklepios District Hospital was an important economic factor in the 1990s. It was closed in April 2008.

The General Heinrich August von Helldorff barracks is one of the former sites of the Bundeswehr. Today it is used by the AGCO Group.

== Education ==
- Agricolagymnasium - High School
- Grundschule Hohenmölsen - Primary School
- Grundschule Granschütz - Primary School
- Sekundarschule Hohenmölsen - Secondary School
- Pestalozzischule Hohenmölsen - Special Needs School
- Volkshochschule Burgenlandkreis "Dr. Wilhelm Harnisch" Außenstelle Hohenmölsen - Adult education centre
