= Profen coal mine =

Coal mine in Saxony-Anhalt, Germany

Coordinates: 51.1333°N 12.1667°E

Profen Coal Mine
- Interactive map of Profen Coal Mine
- Location: Saxony-Anhalt, Germany
- Products: Lignite

The Profen Coal Mine is a coal mine located near Hohenmölsen and Zeitz in Saxony-Anhalt. The mine has coal reserves amounting to 115 million tonnes of lignite, one of the largest coal reserves in Europe and the world and has an annual production of 9 million tonnes of coal. As of 2018, Mibrag has paid €550 million ($644 million) in local taxes per year, or 16 percent of the district's revenue.
