= Granschütz =

- Stadtteil of Hohenmölsen
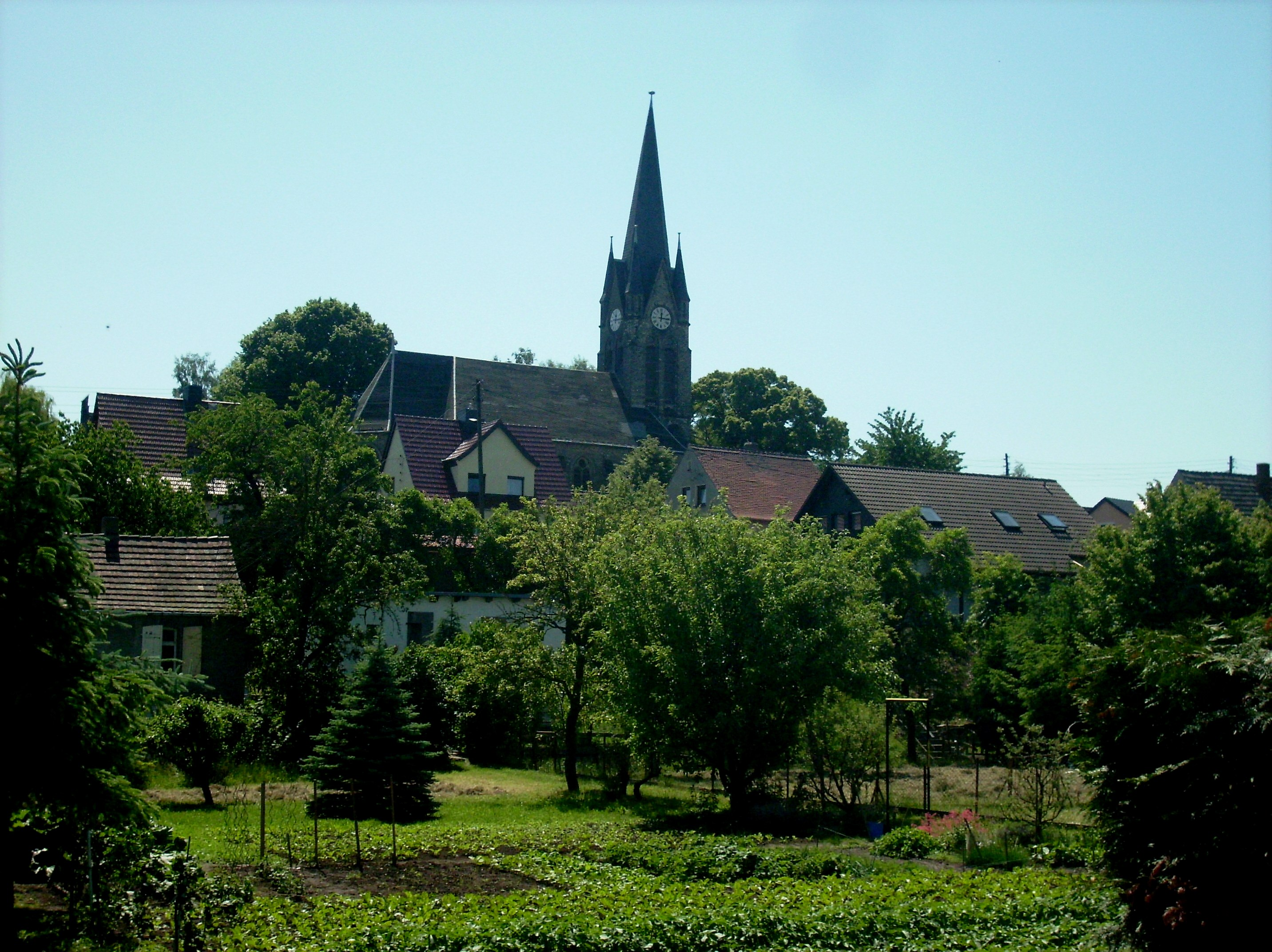
- Granschütz
- Interactive map of Granschütz
- Location within Germany Location within Saxony-Anhalt
- Coordinates: 51°11′N 12°3′E
- Country: Germany
- State: Saxony-Anhalt
- District: Burgenlandkreis
- Town: Hohenmölsen

Area
  - Total: 6.52 km^{2} (2.52 sq mi)
- Elevation: 148 m (486 ft)

Population (2006-12-31)
  - Total: 1,146
  - Density: 176/km^{2} (455/sq mi)
- Time zone: UTC+01:00 (CET)
  - Summer (DST): UTC+02:00 (CEST)
- Postal codes: 06679
- Dialling codes: 034441

Granschütz is a village and a former municipality in the Burgenlandkreis district, in Saxony-Anhalt, Germany.

Since 1 January 2010, it is part of the town Hohenmölsen.
