= List of German World War II night fighter aces =

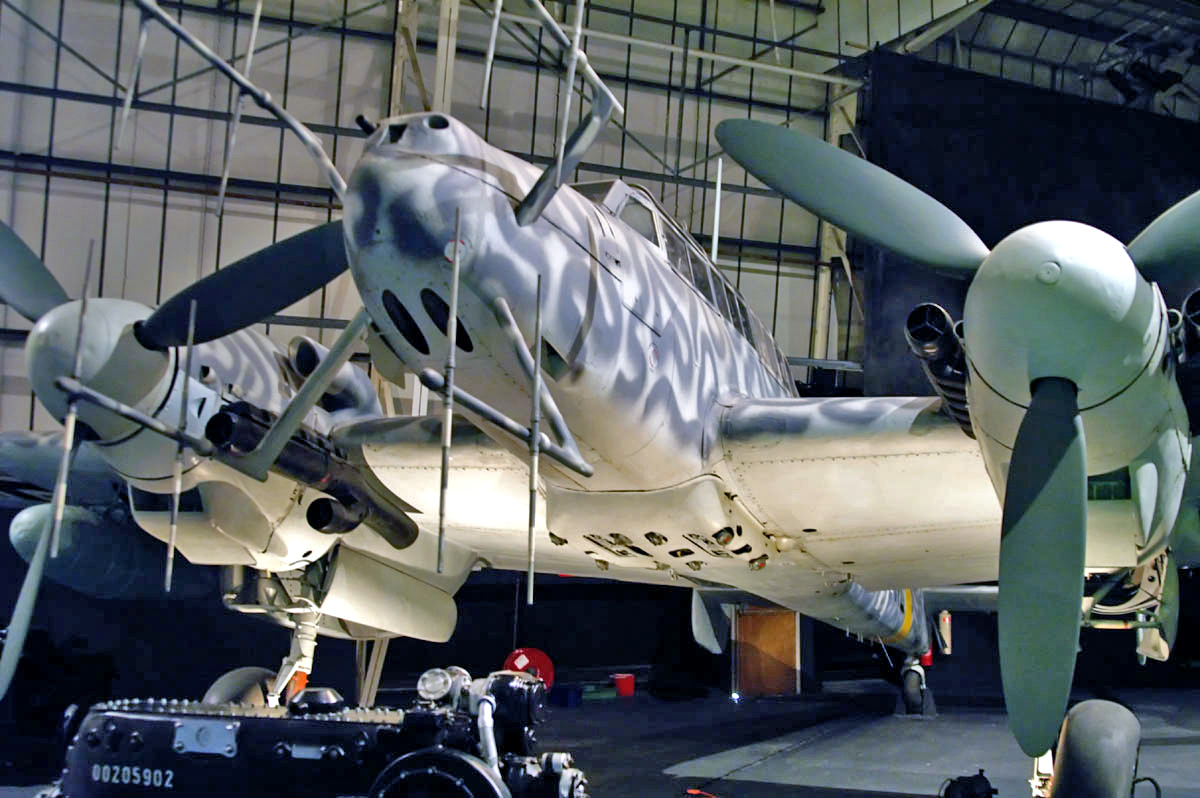
A German Bf 110G-4 night fighter at the RAF Museum in London.

A flying ace or fighter ace is a military aviator credited with shooting down five or more enemy aircraft during aerial combat. German day and night fighter pilots claimed roughly 70,000 aerial victories during World War II, 25,000 over British or American and 45,000 over Soviet flown aircraft. 103 German fighter pilots shot down more than 100 enemy aircraft, for a total of roughly 15,400 aerial victories. Roughly a further 360 pilots claimed between 40 and 100 aerial victories, for about 21,000 victories.

Another 500 fighter pilots claimed between 20 and 40 victories, for a total of 15,000 victories. According to Obermeier, it is relatively certain, that 2,500 German fighter pilots attained ace status, having achieved at least 5 aerial victories. 453 German day and Zerstörer (destroyer) pilots received the Knight's Cross of the Iron Cross. 85 night fighter pilots, including 14 crew members, were awarded the Knight's Cross of the Iron Cross. The list is sorted by the number of aerial victories claimed at night.

Due to the worsening war situation for Germany and Luftwaffe policies, night fighter aces remained in frontline roles until they were killed or wounded in combat, or no longer capable of flying due to exhaustion.

== German night fighter aces ==
This along with the * (asterisk), indicates that the pilot was either killed in action, missing in action or killed in a flying accident.
This and the / (slash) indicates information discrepancies listed by Aders, Obermaier, Scutts, Spick, Mathews and Foreman.

Name	Rank	Night victories claimed	Day victories claimed	Total wartime victories claimed	Unit	Notes	
Heinz-Wolfgang Schnaufer	Major	121/119	0	121	NJG 1, NJG 4	Nicknamed "The Spook of St. Trond",	
Helmut Lent*	Oberst	102	8	110/112	ZG 76, NJG 1, NJG 2, NJG 3	killed in flying accident 7 October 1944	
Heinrich Prinz zu Sayn-Wittgenstein*	Major	83/79	0	83	NJG 2	killed in action 21 January 1944	
Werner Streib	Oberst	67	1	68	ZG 1, NJG 1	—	
Manfred Meurer*	Hauptmann	65	0	65	NJG 1, NJG 5	killed in action 21 January 1944	—
Günther Radusch	Oberst	65/64	1/0	65	ZG 1, NJG 1, NJG 3, NJG 2	—	—
Rudolf Schoenert	Major	64	0	64	NJG 1, NJG 2, NJG 3, NJG 100, NJGr 10, NJG 5	—	—
Heinz Rökker	Hauptmann	63	1	64	NJG 2	—	—
Paul Zorner	Major	59	0	59	NJG 2, NJG 3, NJG 100, NJG 5	—	—
Martin Becker	Hauptmann	58	0	58	NJG 4, NJG 6	—	—
Gerhard Raht	Hauptmann	58/59	0	58/59	NJG 3, NJG 2	—	—
Wilhelm Herget	Major	57	16	73	ZG 76, NJG 3, NJG 1, NJG 4, JV 44	—	—
Kurt Welter	Oberleutnant	56	7	63	JG 301, Kdo Welter, NJG 11	—	—
Gustav Francsi	Oberleutnant	56	0	56	NJG 100	—	—
Josef Kraft	Hauptmann	56	0	56	NJG 4, NJG 5, NJG 6, NJG 1	—	—
Heinz Strüning*	Hauptmann	56	0	56	ZG 26, NJG 2, NJG 1	killed in action 25 December 1944	
Hans-Dieter Frank*	Hauptmann	55	0	55	ZG 1, NJG 1	killed in action 27 September 1943	—
Heinz Vinke*	Oberfeldwebel	54	0	54	NJG 1	killed in action 26 February 1944	
August Geiger*	Hauptmann	53	0	53	NJG 1	killed in action 29 September 1943	—
Egmont Prinz zur Lippe-Weißenfeld*	Major	51	0	51	ZG 76, NJG 1, NJG 2, NJG 5	killed in flying accident 22 March 1944	
Werner Hoffmann	Major	50	1	51	ZG 52, ZG 2, NJG 3, NJG 5	—	—
Reinhard Kollak	Stabsfeldwebel	49	0	49	NJG 1, NJG 4	—	—
Hermann Greiner	Hauptmann	47	4	51	NJG 1	—	—
Herbert Lütje	Oberstleutnant	47	3	50	NJG 1, NJG 6	—	
Johannes Hager	Hauptmann	47	1	48	NJG 1	—	—
Paul Gildner*	Oberleutnant	46	2	48	ZG 1, NJG 1	killed in action 24 February 1943	
Hans-Heinz Augenstein*	Hauptmann	46	0	46	NJG 1	killed in action 7 December 1944	—
Paul Semrau*	Major	46	0	46	NJG 2	killed in action 8 February 1945	
Ernst-Georg Drünkler	Hauptmann	45	2	47	ZG 2, NJG 1, NJG 5	—	—
Rudolf Frank*	Leutnant	45	0	45	NJG 3	killed in action 27 April 1944	—
Alois Lechner*	Major	45	0	45	NJG 2, NJG 100	missing in action 23 February 1944	—
Ludwig Becker*	Hauptmann	44	0	44	NJG 1, NJG 2	killed in action 26 February 1943	—
Reinhold Knacke*	Hauptmann	44	0	44	ZG 1, NJG 1	killed in action 3 February 1943	—
Walter Borchers*	Oberstleutnant	43	16	59	NJG 5	killed in action 6 March 1945	—
Martin Drewes	Major	43	6	49	ZG 76, NJG 1	—	—
Werner Baake	Hauptmann	41	0	41	NJG 1	—	—
Dietrich Schmidt	Hauptmann	40	0	40	NJG 1	—	—
Leopold Fellerer	Hauptmann	39	2	41	NJG 1, NJG 5, NJG 6	—	—
Ludwig Meister	Hauptmann	38	1	39	NJG 1, NJG 4	—	—
Eckart-Wilhelm von Bonin	Major	37	2	39	NJG 1, NJG 102	—	—
Walter Ehle*	Major	35	4	39	ZG 1, NJG 1	killed in flying accident 18 November 1943	—
Wilhelm Beier	Oberleutnant	38	0	38	NJG 2, NJG 1, NJG 3	—	
Helmut Bergmann*	Hauptmann	36	0	36	NJG 4, NJG 1	killed in action 6 August 1944	—
Günther Bertram	Oberleutnant	35	0	35	NJG 100	—	—
Günther Bahr	Oberfeldwebel	34	3	37	SKG 210, NJG 4, NJG 6	—	—
Heinz-Horst Hißbach*	Hauptmann	34	0	34	NJG 2	killed in action 14 April 1945	—
Werner Husemann	Major	34	0	34	NJG 1, NJG 3	—	—
Wilhelm Johnen	Hauptmann	34	0	34	NJG 1, NJG 5, NJG 6	—	—
Ernst-Wilhelm Modrow	Hauptmann	34	0	34	NJG 1	—	—
Heinz-Martin Hadeball	Hauptmann	33	0	33	NJG 1, NJG 4, NJG 6, NJGr 10	—	—
Karl-Heinz Scherfling*	Oberfeldwebel	33	0	33	NJG 1	killed in action 21 July 1944	—
Paul-Hubert Rauh	Major	31	0	31	NJG 1, NJG 4	—	—
Gerhard Friedrich*	Major	30	0	30	NJG 4, NJG 6	killed in action 16 March 1945	—
Heinz Ferger*	Hauptmann	30	0	30	NJG 2, NJG 3	killed in action 10 April 1945	—
Hans Leickhardt*	Major	30	0	30	NJG 3, NJG 1, NJG 5	missing in action 5 March 1945	—
Friedrich-Karl Müller	Major	30	0	30	JG 300, NJGr 10	—	—
Heinrich Wohlers*	Major	29	0	29	NJG 1, NJG 4, NJG 6	killed in flying accident 15 March 1944	—
Paul Szameitat*	Hauptmann	28	1	29	NJG 1, NJG 5, NJG 3	killed in action 2 January 1944	—
Hans-Joachim Jabs	Oberstleutnant	28	22	50	ZG 76, NJG 1	—	
Fritz Lau	Hauptmann	28	0	28	NJG 1	—	—
Johannes Krause	Hauptmann	28	0	28	NJG 3, NJG 4, NJG 101	—	—
Rudolf Sigmund*	Hauptmann	27	2	28	NJG 1	killed in action 4 October 1943	—
Heinz Grimm*	Leutnant	26	1	27	NJG 1	died of wounds 13 October 1943	—
Alfons Köster*	Hauptmann	25	1	26	NJG 1, NJG 2, NJG 3	killed in action 6 January 1945	—
Helmuth Schulte	Hauptmann	25	0	25	NJG 5, NJG 6	—	—
Lothar Linke*	Oberleutnant	24 (Note: Linke claimed 25 aerial victories while serving with NJG 1, one of which was during a daytime mission.)	3	27	ZG 76, NJG 1, NJG 2	killed in action 14 May 1943	—
Peter Spoden	Hauptmann	24/23	0	0	NJG 5, NJG 6	—	—
Wolfgang Thimmig	Oberstleutnant	23	0	23	NJG 1, NJG 2, NJG 4	—	—
Hans Autenrieth	Hauptmann	23/22	0	23	NJG 1, NJG 4	—	—
Horst Patuschka*	Hauptmann	23	0	23	NJG 2	killed in flying accident 6 March 1943	—
Rudolf Altendorf	Hauptmann	22+	2	29/24	ZG 2, LG 1, NJG 3, NJG 4, NJG 5	—	—
Josef Kociok*	Oberfeldwebel	21	12	33	ZG 76, SKG 210, 10(NJ)/ZG 1, NJG 200	killed in action 26 September 1943	
Robert Wolf*	Leutnant	21	0	21	NJG 5	killed in action 23 April 1944	—
Hans Berschwinger*	Oberfeldwebel	20	0	20	NJG 1, NJG 2	killed in action 15 February 1944	—
Reinhold Eckardt*	Oberleutnant	19	3	22	NJG 1, NJG 3	killed in action 30 July 1942	—
Adolf Breves	Hauptmann	18	0	18	NJG 1	—	—
Wolfgang Schneeweis*	Hauptmann	17	0	17	NJG 200	missing in action 28/29 July 1943	—
Helmut Woltersdorf*	Oberleutnant	16	8	24	ZG 141, ZG 76, NJG 1	killed in action 2 June 1942	—
Hermann Wischnewski	Oberfähnrich	16	2	18	JG 300	—	—
Joachim Wandel*	Hauptmann	16	59	75	JG 54	killed in action 7 October 1942	—
Georg Kraft*	Feldwebel	15	0	15	NJG 1	killed in action 18 August 1943	—
Klaus Bretschneider*	Oberleutnant	14	20	34	JG 300	killed in action 24 December 1944	—
Hans Hahn*	Leutnant	13	0	13	NJG 2	killed in flying accident 11 October 1941	—
Günter Fink*	Hauptmann	11	37	48	JG 54	missing in action 15 May 1943	—
Engelbert Heiner*	Oberfeldwebel	11	0	11	NJG 6	killed in action 19 March 1945	—
Ernst Zechlin	Hauptmann	10	0	10	NJG 2, NJG 5	—	—
Heinz Oberheide*	Feldwebel	10/7	0	10/7	NJG 3	killed in action 8 February 1945	—
Hajo Herrmann	Oberst	9	0	9	JG 300	—	
Ernst-Erich Hirschfeld*	Oberleutnant	8	16	24	JG 300	killed in action 28 July 1944	—
Ulrich Wulff*	Oberleutnant	8	0	8	NJG 5	killed in action 16 December 1943	—
Karl-Heinz Becker	Hauptmann	7	0	7	NJG 11	—	—
Robert Plewa*	Oberleutnant	6	0	6	JG 300	Killed when plane ran out of fuel 29/30 September	—
Horst Henning	Hauptmann	6	0	6	NJG 3	—	—
