= Josef Kraft =

Austrian-German World War II fighter pilot (1921–1994)

- Born: 8 February 1921; Vienna, Austria
- Died: 16 October 1994 (aged 73); Fürstenfeldbruck, Germany
- Military career
- Allegiance: Nazi Germany (1940–45); West Germany (1956–80)
- Service years: 1940–45; 1956–80
- Rank: Hauptmann(Wehrmacht); Oberst (Bundeswehr)
- Units: NJG 4, NJG 5, NJG 6, NJG 1
- Commands: 7./NJG 6, 12./NJG 1 Luftwaffenversorgungsregiment 2
- Conflicts: World War II; Defense of the Reich
- Awards: Knight's Cross of the Iron Cross with Oak Leaves

Josef Kraft (8 February 1921 – 16 October 1994) was a German military aviator in the Luftwaffe during World War II and an officer in the postwar German Air Force. As a fighter ace, he was credited with 56 aerial victories claimed in 129 combat missions, making him the thirteenth, a shared distinction, the most successful night fighter pilot in the history of aerial warfare. All of his victories were claimed in Defense of the Reich missions, the majority against the Royal Air Force's (RAF) Bomber Command and United States Army Air Forces (USAAF) on the Western Front and four against the Soviet Air Forces on the Eastern Front.

Born in Vienna, Kraft grew up in the First Austrian Republic, the Federal State of Austria and Nazi Germany. Following graduation from school, he joined the military service in 1940, initially serving with an anti-aircraft artillery he was later trained as a pilot. In 1942, he was posted to Nachtjagdgeschwader 4 (NJG 4—4th Night Fighter Wing) and to Nachtjagdgeschwader 5 (NJG 5—5th Night Fighter Wing) in 1943. Kraft claimed his first aerial victory on the night of 27/28 August 1943. In May 1944, his Gruppe was subordinated to Nachtjagdgeschwader 6 (NJG 6—6th Night Fighter Wing) based in Hungary. Following his 44th aerial victory, he was awarded the Knight's Cross of the Iron Cross on 30 September 1944, shortly after, he was appointed squadron leader of 7. Staffel (7th squadron) of NJG 6. Kraft claimed his last aerial victories on 22/23 March 1945 and was awarded the Knight's Cross of the Iron Cross with Oak Leaves 17 April.

Following the rearmament of the Federal Republic of Germany, Kraft joined the German Air Force in July 1956. He died on 16 October 1994 in Fürstenfeldbruck.

== Early life and career ==
Kraft, the son of a tram driver, was born on 8 February 1921 in Vienna, the capital of First Austrian Republic. He joined the military service of the Wehrmacht on 11 April 1940, initially serving with Flak-Regiment 42 (42nd anti-aircraft artillery regiment) of the Luftwaffe. Kraft volunteered for flight service and was promoted to Oberfähnrich (officer candidate) on 1 July 1941. Following night fighter flight training, (Note: Flight training in the Luftwaffe progressed through the levels A1, A2 and B1, B2, referred to as A/B flight training. A training included theoretical and practical training in aerobatics, navigation, long-distance flights and dead-stick landings. The B courses included high-altitude flights, instrument flights, night landings and training to handle the aircraft in difficult situations. For pilots destined to fly multi-engine aircraft, the training was completed with the Luftwaffe Advanced Pilot's Certificate (Erweiterter Luftwaffen-Flugzeugführerschein), also known as the C-Certificate.) he was promoted to Leutnant (second lieutenant) on 1 November 1941 and continued to serve with a Luftwaffe training unit 16 August 1942.

== World War II ==
A map of part of the Kammhuber Line. The 'belt' and night fighter 'boxes' are shown.

World War II in Europe had begun on Friday, 1 September 1939, when German forces invaded Poland. Following the 1939 aerial Battle of the Heligoland Bight, Royal Air Force (RAF) attacks shifted to the cover of darkness, initiating the Defence of the Reich campaign. By mid-1940, Generalmajor (Brigadier General) Josef Kammhuber had established a night air defense system dubbed the Kammhuber Line. It consisted of a series of control sectors equipped with radars and searchlights and an associated night fighter. Each sector named a Himmelbett (canopy bed) would direct the night fighter into visual range with target bombers. In 1941, the Luftwaffe started equipping night fighters with airborne radar such as the Lichtenstein radar. This airborne radar did not come into general use until early 1942.

=== Night fighter career ===
In October 1942, Kraft was posted to II. Gruppe (2nd group) of Nachtjagdgeschwader 4 (NJG 4—4th Night Fighter Wing). (Note: For an explanation of the meaning of Luftwaffe unit designation see Organisation of the Luftwaffe during World War II.) In January 1943, he was again transferred then serving with II. Gruppe of Nachtjagdgeschwader 5 (NJG 5—5th Night Fighter Wing). Kraft claimed his first air victory on 27/28 August 1943, an Avro Lancaster bomber shot down 22 kilometres (14 miles) west of Nuremberg For this, he was awarded the Iron Cross 2nd Class (Eisernes Kreuz zweiter Klasse) on 1 September and the Iron Cross 1st Class (Eisernes Kreuz erster Klasse) on 15 November.

Kraft was promoted to Oberleutnant (first lieutenant) on 1 February 1944 and received the Honor Goblet of the Luftwaffe (Ehrenpokal der Luftwaffe) on 31 March. In May, II. Gruppe was subordinated to Nachtjagdgeschwader 6 (NJG 6—6th Night Fighter Wing) and moved Hungary on the southern sector of the Eastern Front. He was awarded the German Cross in Gold (Deutsches Kreuz in Gold) on 23 July 1944. By September 1944, his number of aerial victories had increased to 44 for which he received the Knight's Cross of the Iron Cross (Ritterkreuz des Eisernen Kreuzes) on 30 September.

In February and March 1945, he claimed his last aerial victories, increasing his total to 56. For which he was awarded the Knight's Cross of the Iron Cross with Oak Leaves (Ritterkreuz des Eisernen Kreuzes mit Eichenlaub) on 17 April, the 838th officer or soldier of the Wehrmacht so honored. At the end of war he was taken prisoner of war by British forces and was released in August 1945.

== Later life ==
Following the Wiederbewaffnung (rearmament) of the Federal Republic of Germany, Kraft joined the German Air Force in 1956. From 1 October 1957 to 31 March 1980, he commanded the Luftwaffenversorgungsregiment 2 and retired holding the rank of Oberst (colonel). Kraft died on 16 October 1994 in Fürstenfeldbruck.

== Summary of career ==
=== Aerial victory claims ===
According to US historian David T. Zabecki, Kraft was credited with 56 aerial victories. Obermaier lists Kraft with 56 nocturnal aerial victories, four of which on the Eastern Front, claimed in 129 combat missions. Foreman, Parry and Mathews, authors of Luftwaffe Night Fighter Claims 1939 – 1945, researched the German Federal Archives and found records for 56 nocturnal victory claims Mathews and Foreman also published Luftwaffe Aces — Biographies and Victory Claims, listing Kraft with 51 claims, plus five further unconfirmed claims.

Chronicle of aerial victories
This and the ? (question mark) indicates information discrepancies listed in Luftwaffe Night Fighter Claims 1939 – 1945 but not in Luftwaffe Aces — Biographies and Victory Claims.
Claim	Date	Time	Type	Location	Serial No./Squadron No.
– 6. Staffel of Nachtjagdgeschwader 5 –
1? (Note: According to Mathews and Foreman, this claim was unconfirmed.)	28 August 1943	01:20	Lancaster	22 km (14 mi) west of Nuremberg	
2	1 September 1943	00:47	Lancaster	25 km (16 mi) south-southwest of Berlin	Lancaster JA848/No. 619 Squadron RAF
3?	1 September 1943	00:55	Stirling	east of Berlin	
4	27 September 1943	23:26	Lancaster	Hannover	Halifax JB968/No. 428 Squadron RAF
5	9 October 1943	01:32	Stirling	40–50 km (25–31 mi) north of Bremen	
6?	26 November 1943	21:52	Lancaster	Berlin	
7	2 December 1943	20:32	Lancaster	Berlin	
– 5. Staffel of Nachtjagdgeschwader 5 –
8	6 January 1944	03:33	Lancaster	Stettin	
9	6 January 1944	03:45	Lancaster	northwest of Stettin	
10	6 January 1944	04:01	Lancaster	northwest of Stettin	
11?	14 January 1944	20:20	Lancaster	Berlin	
12	20 January 1944	19:45	Lancaster	Berlin	
13	21 January 1944	23:15	Halifax	Magdeburg	Halifax DK237/No. 428 (Ghost) Squadron RCAF
14	21 January 1944	23:20	Halifax	Magdeburg	
15	29 January 1944	03:28	Lancaster	Berlin	
16	30 January 1944	20:09	Lancaster	Berlin	
17	30 January 1944	20:16	Lancaster	Berlin	
18?	30 January 1944	20:28	Lancaster	Berlin	
– 4. Staffel of Nachtjagdgeschwader 5 –
19	15 February 1944	20:46	Lancaster	southwest of Rostock	
20	15 February 1944	21:13	Halifax	Neuruppin	
21	20 February 1944	03:17	four-engined bomber	vicinity of Brandenburg	Halifax LK905/No. 431 (Iroquois) Squadron RCAF (Note: According to the Aviation Safety Network, potentially claimed by Oberleutnant Paul Zorner.)
22	24 March 1944	22:23	four-engined bomber	5 km (3.1 mi) south of Berlin	
23	24 March 1944	22:58	four-engined bomber	Wertheim	
24	27 April 1944	01:24	Lancaster	10–20 km (6.2–12.4 mi) south of Strasbourg	
25	27 April 1944	01:45	Lancaster	vicinity of Strasbourg	
26	28 April 1944	02:24	Halifax	Friedrichshafen	
– 7. Staffel of Nachtjagdgeschwader 6 –
27	25 May 1944	02:18	Lancaster	Listig	Lancaster DV389/No. 101 Squadron RAF
28	25 May 1944	02:24	Lancaster	Eifel PN-3	Lancaster ND624/No. 103 Squadron RAF
26	26 June 1944	00:40	Halifax	Tamási	
30	7 July 1944	01:20	Wellington	south of Sankt Pölten	
31	7 July 1944	01:27	Wellington	south of Sankt Pölten	
32	21 July 1944	23:40	Wellington	west of Brod	
33	8 August 1944	01:27	Wellington	Körmend	
34	20 August 1944	23:10	Wellington	east of Steyr	
35	20 August 1944	23:18	Wellington		
36	21 August 1944	23:14	Wellington	Komárom	
37	22 August 1944	23:14	Wellington	Gyöngyös	
38	22 August 1944	23:23	B-24	Tiszafüred	
39	14 September 1944	22:00	Il-4	20 km (12 mi) north of Budapest	
40	18 September 1944	21:40	PS-84	Tokaj	
41	19 September 1944	21:04	PS-84	Nyíregyháza	
42	19 September 1944	21:20	PS-84	Nyíregyháza	
43	20 September 1944	23:08	Wellington	Szombathely	
44	20 September 1944	23:12	Wellington	Szombathely	
45	13 October 1944	20:36	B-24	Tamási	
46	13 October 1944	20:46	Wellington	southeast of Barcs	
47	20 October 1944	21:43	Wellington	Szombathely	
48	20 October 1944	22:10	B-24	Szombathely	
49	20 October 1944	22:15	Wellington	Szombathely	
– 8. Staffel of Nachtjagdgeschwader 6 –
50	21 February 1945	01:05	Halifax	Duisburg	
51	21 February 1945	01:09	Halifax	Duisburg	
52	24 February 1945	22:07	Halifax	Duisburg	Halifax MZ448/No. 462 Squadron RAF
53	3 March 1945	21:59	Lancaster	west of Münster	
54	3 March 1945	22:07	Lancaster	west of Münster	
55	23 March 1945	04:14	Lancaster	Bochum	
56	23 March 1945	04:00	B-17		

=== Awards ===
- Iron Cross (1939)
  - 2nd Class (1 September 1943)
  - 1st Class (5 November 1943)
- Honour Goblet of the Luftwaffe (Ehrenpokal der Luftwaffe) on 1 May 1944 as Leutnant and pilot (Note: According to Obermaier on 31 March 1944.)
- Front Flying Clasp of the Luftwaffe in Gold (18 February 1945)
- German Cross in Gold on 23 July 1944 as Oberleutnant in the 8./Nachtjagdgeschwader 6
- Knight's Cross of the Iron Cross with Oak Leaves
  - Knight's Cross on 30 September 1944 as Oberleutnant and pilot in the II./Nachtjagdgeschwader 6 (Note: According to Scherzer as pilot in the 7./Nachtjagdgeschwader 6.)
  - 838th Oak Leaves on 17 April 1945 as Hauptmann and Staffelkapitän of the 12./Nachtjagdgeschwader 1

=== Promotions ===
Wehrmacht
1 July 1941:	Oberfähnrich (officer candidate)
1 November 1941:	Leutnant (second lieutenant)
1 February 1944:	Oberleutnant (first lieutenant)
1 January 1945:	Hauptmann (captain)
Bundeswehr
?	Oberst (colonel)
