= Martin Becker =

German fighter pilot (1916–2006)

- Becker as an Oberleutnant
- Born: 12 April 1916; Wiesbaden
- Died: 8 February 2006 (aged 89); Oberneisen
- Military career
- Allegiance: Nazi Germany
- Branch: Luftwaffe
- Service years: 1940–1945
- Rank: Hauptmann (captain)
- Units: NJG 4, NJG 6
- Commands: IV./NJG 6
- Conflicts: World War II
- Awards: Knight's Cross of the Iron Cross with Oak Leaves

Martin Becker (12 April 1916 – 8 February 2006) was a German Luftwaffe military aviator during World War II, a night fighter ace credited with 58 aerial victories making him the tenth most successful night fighter pilot in the history of aerial warfare. All of his victories were claimed over the Western Front in Defense of the Reich missions, the majority at night against the Royal Air Force's (RAF) Bomber Command and one daytime claim over a United States Army Air Forces (USAAF) Boeing B-17 Flying Fortress.

Born in Wiesbaden, Becker grew up in the Weimar Republic and Nazi Germany. Following graduation from school, he joined the military service in 1936 and was trained as an air observer and was posted to a bomber wing and participated in the Battle of France. In September 1940, he started flight training. In 1943, Becker was posted to a night fighter wing and claimed his first aerial victory on the night of 23/24 September 1943. Following his 26th aerial victory, he was awarded the Knight's Cross of the Iron Cross on 1 April 1944 and was given command IV. Gruppe of Nachtjagdgeschwader 6 (NJG 6–6th Night Fighter Wing) in October 1944. On 20 March 1945, he was awarded the Knight's Cross of the Iron Cross with Oak Leaves.

Becker, who flew approximately 110 combat missions, died on 8 February 2006 in Oberneisen.

== Early life ==
Becker was born on 12 April 1916 at Wiesbaden at the time in Hesse-Nassau, a province of the Kingdom of Prussia. On 25 October 1936, Becker joined the Luftwaffe. On 1 April 1937 he was assigned to Kampfgeschwader 155 (KG 155–155th Bomber Wing), and then to an aerial reconnaissance unit. On 16 November 1939, he was posted to Ergänzungs-Aufklärungsgruppe 2, a reconnaissance group. On 19 January 1940, he transferred to the 4. Staffel (squadron) of Heeres-Ergänzungs-Aufklärungsgruppe 21 (21st army reconnaissance group) as an Oberfeldwebel (master sergeant).

== World War II ==
World War II in Europe began on Friday 1 September 1939 when German forces invaded Poland. From 10 May 1940, Becker flew reconnaissance missions in the Battle of France and Battle of Belgium. He was promoted to Leutnant der Reserve (second lieutenant of the reserves) on 1 July 1940. In September 1940, at the height of the Battle of Britain, Becker transferred to the flight training school at Merseburg, (Note: Flight training in the Luftwaffe progressed through the levels A1, A2 and B1, B2, referred to as A/B flight training. A training included theoretical and practical training in aerobatics, navigation, long-distance flights and dead-stick landings. The B courses included high-altitude flights, instrument flights, night landings and training to handle the aircraft in difficult situations. For pilots destined to fly multi-engine aircraft, the training was completed with the Luftwaffe Advanced Pilot's Certificate (Erweiterter Luftwaffen-Flugzeugführerschein), also known as the C-Certificate.) which acted as a fighter pilot school for Jagdgeschwader 51. Becker received basic and advanced training as a night fighter pilot while based there. He was promoted to Oberleutnant der Reserve (first lieutenant of the reserves) on 1 April 1942. In 1943, Becker was posted to 11. Staffel (11th squadron) of Nachtjagdgeschwader 4 (NJG 4—Night Fighter Wing 4). On 1 August, 11./NJG 4 became 2./Nachtjagdgeschwader 6 (NJG 6—Night Fighter Wing 6).

=== Night fighter career ===
A map of part of the Kammhuber Line. The 'belt' and night fighter 'boxes' are shown.

Following the 1939 aerial Battle of the Heligoland Bight, Royal Air Force (RAF) attacks shifted to the cover of darkness, initiating the Defence of the Reich campaign. By mid-1940, Generalmajor (Brigadier General) Josef Kammhuber had established a night air defense system dubbed the Kammhuber Line. It consisted of a series of control sectors equipped with radars and searchlights and an associated night fighter. Each sector named a Himmelbett (canopy bed) would direct the night fighter into visual range with target bombers. In 1941, the Luftwaffe started equipping night fighters with airborne radar such as the Lichtenstein radar. This airborne radar did not come into general use until early 1942.

=== Battle of Berlin ===
Becker scored his first victory on the night of 23 September 1943 at 23:21 south of Hameln. In October 1943 Becker was appointed to Staffelkapitän (squadron leader), 2./NJG 6. Becker shot down three bombers on the night of 18/19 November 1943 as RAF Bomber Command began their Berlin offensive. Becker claimed a Short Stirling at Lampertheim at 20:44. Southwest of Mannheim he claimed a Handley-Page Halifax destroyed at 20:56 and another near Rimbach at 21:05 for his second to fourth victories. Becker achieved ace status on 21 December when he claimed one Avro Lancaster bomber two Halifax between 19:50 and 19:55. On the night of 20 February 1944 Becker downed three bombers—two Lancasters and a Halifax—between 03:02 and 04:18 in the airspace between Celle and Leipzig. One of the Lancasters may have been JB469 EA-B from No. 49 Squadron RAF. Pilot Flight Sergeant E. White, Sergeants J. R. Ward, W.W. S. Compton (navigator), J. E. Ellis (radio operator), D. N. Stevens, J. T. Loveland, and H. Thomas were killed in action. The Halifax was LV834, and belonged to No. 35 Squadron RAF. Pilot, Flying Officer Randal Vincent Jones was killed with four other men. Two men included Horatius Douglas Stewart White DFM, were captured.

On 25 February, Becker attacked and claimed two Lancasters at 21:30 and 21:49. In the evening of 22 March 1944 Becker claimed six between 21:42 to 22:39 which elevated his total to 18 bombers destroyed. Two were accounted for near Hamm-Paderborn, the other four were claimed around Frankfurt. Four were Halifax bombers and two were Lancasters. On 24 March Becker claimed a Lancaster at 22:35.

=== Nürnberg raid ===
On the night of the 30/31 March 1944, Bomber Command suffered heavy losses on a raid to Nürnberg. Becker claimed seven Allied bombers shot down between 00:20 and 03:15; the first was claimed southwest of Cologne. One of Becker's victories was Lancaster ND535 ZN-Q, of No. 106 Squadron RAF. Pilot Officer R. Starkey and one of his crew survived, the others were killed. Another victory this night has been identified as Lancaster III ND466 (GT-Z), No. 156 Squadron RAF flown by Squadron leader P. R. Goodwin. Flying Officer W. C. Isted (DFM), E. H. J. Summers, J. V. Scrivener (RCAF) became prisoners of war. Pilot Officer C. A. Rose RAAF, Flying Officer H. C. Frost, Warrant Officer J. C. Baxter (DFM) and O. V. Gardner (DFM) were killed. Halifax III MZ504 QO-C, No. 432 Squadron RAF was also downed by Becker. Pilot Officer C. R. Narum and Sergeants W. R. Rathwell, S. Saprunoff, R. Thomson were killed and Flight Sergeants R. P. Goeson, L. E. Pigeon and A. H. Marini were captured. Becker also shot down No. 51 Squadron RAF Halifax LV857 MH-H2 flown by Sergeant J. P. G Binder. Sergeants J. Brear, E. J. P. Monk, F. Kasher, R. H Manary, plus Flight Sergeants R. A Wilson and W. A Guy were all killed. Becker also shot down the experienced and decorated crew of Lancaster III ND640, OF-B, of No. 97 Squadron RAF flown by Flight Lieutenant L. V. Hyde DFC. Flight Lieutenant E. H. Palmer DFC, Flight Officers Craig DFC (RCAF), R. J. Weller DFM, and Pilot Officer R. Taylor DFC and Flight Sergeants M. Putt and S. Hill were all killed in action when the bomber crashed at Münchholzhausen, southeast of Wetzlar. Halifax III LK800, Al-N, of No. 429 Squadron RAF, also became a victim of Becker this night. Pilot Flying Officer J. A. Dougal was captured with four other members of the crew when it crashed at Weiler-la-Tour, southeast of Luxembourg. Two crewman, Flight Sergeants D. Findlay and R. Dawson evaded capture and went into hiding with the help of locals. The last of Becker's victories that night was Lancaster III LW555, C8-L, of No. 640 Squadron RCAF. Flying Officers C. E. O'Brien, R. D. Van Fleet and R. H. Carleton were killed. Crewman Sergeants E. Bake, E. Martin, T. C. McFadden, A. L. Wangler were also killed. Becker's tally stood at 26 after this night. After the war, Becker said of the mission, "They seemed to be lining up to be shot down. I just had to stop after the seventh one, I was sick of the killing."

Becker was awarded the Knight's Cross of the Iron Cross (Ritterkreuz des Eisernen Kreuzes) on 1 April 1944 for 26 bombers shot down. Becker continued to fly and at 00:58 on 25 April 1944 southwest of Karlsruhe, he accounted for another Halifax. Becker was awarded the German Cross in Gold (Deutsches Kreuz in Gold) later that same day. In the early hours of 27 April, west of beacon "Christa" (Note: Beacon "Christa"—Near Haguenau in approximately 48°47′N 7°47′E), Becker accounted for a Lancaster at 01:30, another west of Stuttgart at 01:36 to reach 29. Twenty-four hours later, 28 April 1944, he accounted for two Lancasters and a Halifax. West of Stuttgart at 01:19 he accounted for a Lancaster for his 30th victory. Another was claimed an unknown location west of beacon "Christa" at 01:35. The last, another Lancaster, was destroyed southwest of Bremen at 01:57. On 26 July at 02:10, west of Stuttgart, Becker achieved his 34th victory over a Lancaster bomber. Becker accounted for two bombers around Luneville at 01:25 and 01:35. The last of the trio was claimed at 01:45 west of Stuttgart. Lancaster ME370, KM-R of No. 44 Squadron RAF crashed near Böblingen, west of Stuttgart. Pilot Officer William Edward Kewley RNZAF was killed along with four crewman. Two survived and were captured. It has been suggested ME370 was one of Becker's claims.

=== Group commander ===
Becker was promoted to Hauptmann der Reserve (captain of the reserves) on 1 August 1944. It took over a month for Becker to add to his personal tally. On 26 August between 00:50 and 01:15 he claimed another three bombers destroyed in the Rüsselsheim am Main area. Becker was appointed Gruppenkommandeur (group commander) of IV. Gruppe of NJG 6 on 20 October 1944, thus succeeding Major Herbert Lütje who had been promoted to command NJG 6 on 13 September. That month he achieved his last victories of the year at 22:45 and 00:23 on 12 September 1944 in the Frankfurt area to achieve his 43rd victory. Becker is said to have downed Lancaster PD262, HA-G, No. 218 Squadron RAF on night of 12 September. Flight Sergeant K. C. Spiers, Flying Officer G. O. B. Sinclair, Flight Lieutenant H. T. Seller, Sergeant W. H. T. Pettman, Flying Officer W. L. Leibhardt (RAAF), Flight Sergeant H. Clarke and Pilot Officers D. W. Clarke and C. A. Black (RAAF) were all killed.

NJG 6 covered the Ruhr and frontline from Bomber Command operations. In December 1944 the German Ardennes Offensive had achieved success but was bogged down. Bomber Command attacked rail targets to disrupt the flow of supplies to the German Army and proceeded to continue its campaign against Germany. On 2/3 January 1945 Becker intercepted two Lancaster bombers over Bruchsal at 18:45 and Luxembourg at 19:32 and claimed both shot down. Lancaster PB823, BH-T, crashed at Longuyon, France, just south of Luxembourg. Squadron leader B. B. Janus of No. 300 Polish Bomber Squadron "Polish", was killed with his six crewmen. It is thought PB823 was downed by Becker. No other German pilot claimed a victory location of the crash, and only two others claimed a victory on that night.

By 1945 Germany was under the threat of invasion. On the night of 21–22 February 1945 German night fighter pilots claimed 57 or 58 British aircraft shot down and one Soviet bomber in defence of German airspace. Becker claimed another three bombers between 20:39 and 20:47 around Worms to achieve his 48th victory. British losses amounted to 34 bombers. Becker's crowning achievement, and a Nachtjagd record, was on 14/15 March 1945, when he claimed nine bombers of No. 5 Group RAF attacking Lützkendorf. Only seven other separate claims were filed on this night: one for Herbert Lütje and three for Gerhard Friedrich and three to other pilots. Becker's victims were downed between 21:53 and 23:37. The first fell near Bad Berka, the second near Apolda at 21:59, two near Naumburg at 22:05 and 22:06. Northeast of Jena at 22:15 and southwest of Heidelsheim at 23:00 a Lancaster was reported shot down at each location. West of Göppingen at 23:15 and southwest of Baiersbronn at 23:37 Becker claimed his 57th victory. Becker's last victory before the final capitulation of Germany came on the evening of 16 March 1945. West of Nuremberg, he claimed a Lancaster at 21:35. It was his 58th success. Hauptmann Martin Becker received the Knight's Cross of the Iron Cross with Oak Leaves (Ritterkreuz des Eisernen Kreuzes mit Eichenlaub) on 20 March 1945, the 792nd serviceman so honoured.

== Later life ==
Becker died on 8 February 2006 in Oberneisen near Limburg an der Lahn.

== Summary of career ==
=== Aerial victory claims ===
According to US historian David T. Zabecki, Becker was credited with 58 aerial victories. Obermaier also lists him with 58 aerial victories, including three of which shot down by his radio operator Karl-Ludwig Johanssen with his rearward-facing MG 131 machine gun. Becker flew approximately 110 combat missions, 83 as a night fighter pilot and 27 as an aerial reconnaissance pilot. Foreman, Parry and Mathews, authors of Luftwaffe Night Fighter Claims 1939 – 1945, researched the German Federal Archives and found records for 58 victory claims, 57 nocturnal and one daytime claim. Mathews and Foreman also published Luftwaffe Aces – Biographies and Victory Claims, listing Becker with 56 claims plus one further unconfirmed claim.

Chronicle of aerial victories
This and the ♠ (Ace of spades) indicates those aerial victories which made Becker an "ace-in-a-day", a term which designates a fighter pilot who has shot down five or more airplanes in a single day. This and the ! (exclamation mark) indicates aerial victories listed in Luftwaffe Night Fighter Claims 1939 – 1945 but not in Luftwaffe Aces – Biographies and Victory Claims. This and the ? (question mark) indicates information discrepancies listed in Luftwaffe Night Fighter Claims 1939 – 1945 but not in Luftwaffe Aces – Biographies and Victory Claims.
Claim	Date	Time	Type	Location	Serial No./Squadron No.
– 2. Staffel of Nachtjagdgeschwader 6 –
1!	23 September 1943	23:21	Lancaster	vicinity of Speyer	
2	18 November 1943	20:44	Stirling	vicinity of Lampertheim	
3	18 November 1943	21:05	Halifax	vicinity of Rimbach	
4	20 December 1943	19:50	Lancaster	Bodenrod	
5	20 December 1943	19:52	Halifax	Weilmünster	
6	20 December 1943	19:55	Halifax	Hintermeilingen	
7	20 February 1944	02:59	Halifax	northwest of Hannover	Halifax LL257/No. 434 (Bluenose) Squadron RCAF
8	20 February 1944	03:02	Halifax	northeast of Hannover	
9	20 February 1944	03:20	Halifax	southeast of Hannover	
10	20 February 1944	04:18	Lancaster	Halle-Leipzig	Lancaster JB469/No. 49 Squadron RAF
11	25 February 1944	21:30	Lancaster	12 km (7.5 mi) east of Lunéville	
12	25 February 1944	21:49	Lancaster	vicinity of Roggenbach	
13♠	22 March 1944	21:42	Halifax	10 km (6.2 mi) southeast of Hamm	
14♠	22 March 1944	21:53	Lancaster	Meyrich	
15♠	22 March 1944	22:10	Halifax	southeast of Frankfurt am Main	
16♠	22 March 1944	22:29	Halifax	northwest of Frankfurt am Main	
17♠	22 March 1944	22:38	Halifax	northwest of Frankfurt am Main	
18♠	22 March 1944	22:39	Halifax	northwest of Frankfurt am Main	
19	24 March 1944	22:35	Lancaster	Reuden	
20♠	31 March 1944	00:20	Lancaster	southwest of Cologne	Lancaster ND466/No. 156 Squadron RAF
21♠	31 March 1944	00:23	Lancaster	southeast of Rosbach	Lancaster ND535/No. 106 Squadron RAF
22♠	31 March 1944	00:33	Halifax	5 km (3.1 mi) northeast of Bad Hönningen	Halifax ND640/No. 97 Squadron RAF
23♠	31 March 1944	00:35	Halifax	5 km (3.1 mi) northeast of Bendorf	Halifax LV857/No. 51 Squadron RAF
24♠	31 March 1944	00:40	Halifax	12 km (7.5 mi) west-northwest of Wetzlar	Halifax LW555/No. 640 Squadron RAF
25♠	31 March 1944	00:50	Halifax	10 km (6.2 mi) northwest of Alsfeld	Halifax MZ504/No. 432 Squadron RAF
26♠	31 March 1944	03:15	Halifax	northwest of Kettenburg	Halifax LK800/No. 429 Squadron RAF
27	25 April 1944	00:58	Halifax	southwest of Karlsruhe	
28	27 April 1944	01:30	Viermot	Beacon "Christa"	
29	27 April 1944	01:36	Lancaster	west of Stuttgart	
30? (Note: According to Mathews and Foreman, this claim is dated 27 April 1944 and listed as unconfirmed.)	28 April 1944	01:19	Lancaster	west of Stuttgart	
31	28 April 1944	01:35	Halifax	vicinity of beacon "Christa"	
32	28 April 1944	01:57	Lancaster	vicinity of beacon "Christa"	
33	28 April 1944	02:19	Halifax	30–50 km (19–31 mi) west of Friedrichshafen	
34	26 July 1944	02:10	Lancaster	west of Stuttgart	
35	29 July 1944	01:25	Lancaster	north of Lunéville	
36	29 July 1944	01:35	Lancaster	northeast of Lunéville	Lancaster ME615/No. 463 Squadron RAAF
37	29 July 1944	01:45	Lancaster	west of Stuttgart	
38	29 July 1944	02:04	Lancaster	Wissembourg	Lancaster LM536/No. 619 Squadron RAF
39	26 August 1944	00:50	Lancaster	northwest of Rüsselsheim	
40	26 August 1944	01:08	Lancaster	west-southwest of Rüsselsheim	
41	26 August 1944	01:15	Halifax	west of Rüsselsheim	
42	12 September 1944	22:45	Lancaster	southwest of Frankfurt am Main	
43	12 September 1944	22:53	Lancaster	south-southwest of Frankfurt am Main	
– IV. Gruppe of Nachtjagdgeschwader 6 –
44	2 January 1945	18:45	Lancaster	Bruchsal	
45	2 January 1945	19:32	Lancaster	Luxembourg	
46	21 February 1945	20:39	Halifax	southwest of Worms	
47	21 February 1945	20:42	Lancaster	northwest of Worms	
48	21 February 1945	20:47	Halifax	northwest of Worms	
49♠	14 March 1945	21:53	Lancaster	Bad Berka	
50♠	14 March 1945	21:59	Lancaster	2 km (1.2 mi) northeast of Apolda	
51♠	14 March 1945	22:03	Lancaster	Naumburg	
52♠	14 March 1945	22:05	Lancaster	3 km (1.9 mi) south of Naumburg	
53♠	14 March 1945	22:06	Lancaster	5 km (3.1 mi) south of Naumburg	
54♠	14 March 1945	22:15	Lancaster	10 km (6.2 mi) northeast of Jena	
55♠	14 March 1945	23:00	Lancaster	8 km (5.0 mi) southwest of Heidelsheim	
56♠	14 March 1945	23:15	Lancaster	3 km (1.9 mi) west of Göppingen	
57♠	14 March 1945	23:37	B-17	5 km (3.1 mi) southeast of Baiersbronn	
58	16 March 1945	21:35	Lancaster	30–50 km (19–31 mi) west of Nürnberg	

=== Awards ===
- Iron Cross (1939)
  - 2nd Class (15 June 1940)
  - 1st Class (19 July 1940)
- Honour Goblet of the Luftwaffe on 15 May 1944 as Oberleutnant and Staffelkapitän
- German Cross in Gold on 25 May 1944 as Oberleutnant in the 2./Nachtjagdgeschwader 6
- Knight's Cross of the Iron Cross with Oak Leaves
  - Knight's Cross on 1 April 1944 as Oberleutnant and pilot in the IV./Nachtjagdgeschwader 6 (Note: According to Scherzer as Oberleutnant (war officer) and pilot in the II./Nachtjagdgeschwader 6.)
  - 792nd Oak Leaves on 20 March 1945 as Hauptmann and Gruppenkommandeur of the IV./Nachtjagdgeschwader 6 (Note: According to Scherzer as Hauptmann of the Reserves.)
