= Helmut Bergmann =

German World War II fighter pilot (1920–1944)

- Born: 26 May 1920; Bochum, Germany
- Died: 6 August 1944 (aged 24); Mortain, German-occupied France
- Burial place: Marigny German war cemetery
- Military career
- Allegiance: Nazi Germany
- Branch: Luftwaffe
- Service years: 1939–1944
- Rank: Hauptmann (Captain)
- Units: NJG 4, NJG 1
- Commands: 8./Nachtjagdgeschwader 4
- Conflicts: See battles World War II: Defense of the Reich; Operation Overlord †
- Awards: Knight's Cross of the Iron Cross

Helmut Bergmann (26 May 1920 – 6 August 1944) was a German Luftwaffe military aviator during World War II, a night fighter ace credited with 36 enemy aircraft shot down in 135 combat missions. (Note: For a list of Luftwaffe night fighter aces see List of German World War II night fighter aces.) All of his victories were claimed over the Western Front in nocturnal Defense of the Reich missions against the Royal Air Force's Bomber Command.

Born in Bochum, Bergmann volunteered for military service in the Luftwaffe of Nazi Germany in 1939 after finishing school. Following flight training, he was initially posted to Nachtjagdgeschwader 1 (NJG 1—1st Night Fighter Wing) in 1941 before he transferred to Nachtjagdgeschwader 4 (NJG 4—4th Night Fighter Wing). He claimed his first aerial victory on 19/20 September 1942 and was awarded the Knight's Cross of the Iron Cross on 9 June 1944. Two months later, on 6 August 1944, he and his crew were killed in action during Operation Lüttich.

== Early life and career ==
Bergmann was born on 26 May 1920 in Bochum, the son of Heinrich Bergmann who later served as a Major in the Luftwaffe, and his wife Edith. In his childhood, Bergmann was a member of the Hitler Youth and underwent his recruit training in Straubing. He then received his flight training at the Flugzeugführerschule A/B in Eger, (Note: Flight training in the Luftwaffe progressed through the levels A1, A2 and B1, B2, referred to as A/B flight training. A training included theoretical and practical training in aerobatics, navigation, long-distance flights and dead-stick landings. The B courses included high-altitude flights, instrument flights, night landings and training to handle the aircraft in difficult situations. For pilots destined to fly multi-engine aircraft, the training was completed with the Luftwaffe Advanced Pilot's Certificate (Erweiterter Luftwaffen-Flugzeugführerschein), also known as the C-Certificate.) present-day Cheb in the Czech Republic. He was then selected to train as a night fighter pilot and posted to the blind flying school Blindflugschule 3 (BFS 3—3rd blind flying school) at Schwäbisch Hall. There, he trained together with Heinz-Wolfgang Schnaufer.

After completing pilot training in July 1941, he was assigned to the Ergänzungsstaffel (Training/Supplement Squadron) of Nachtjagdgeschwader 1 (NJG 1—1st Night Fighter Wing) on 15 July.

== World War II ==
A map of part of the Kammhuber Line. The 'belt' and night fighter 'boxes' are shown.

Following the 1939 aerial Battle of the Heligoland Bight, bombing missions by the Royal Air Force (RAF) shifted to the cover of darkness, initiating the Defence of the Reich campaign. By mid-1940, Generalmajor (Brigadier General) Josef Kammhuber had established a night air defense system dubbed the Kammhuber Line. It consisted of a series of control sectors equipped with radars and searchlights and an associated night fighter. Each sector, named a Himmelbett (canopy bed), would direct the night fighter into visual range with target bombers. In 1941, the Luftwaffe started equipping night fighters with airborne radar such as the Lichtenstein radar. This airborne radar did not come into general use until early 1942.

Bergmann was assigned to 7. Staffel (7th squadron) of Nachtjagdgeschwader 4 (NJG 4—4th Night Fighter Wing) on 1 May 1942. He was credited with his first aerial victory on 19/20 September 1942, an Armstrong Whitworth Whitley bomber, claimed shot down at 00:01 approximately 10 kilometres (6.2 miles) south of Verdun. Bergmann was promoted to Oberleutnant (first lieutenant) on 1 April 1943. On 22 April, he was appointed Staffelkapitän of 8. Staffel of NJG 4. On 23 June 1943, Bergmann and his crew were forced to bail out of their Messerschmitt Bf 110 G-4 (Werknummer 5334—factory number) following aerial combat north of Harderwijk and were injured.

=== 10/11 April 1944 ===
Bergmann claimed seven Avro Lancaster bombers shot down in 46 minutes on the night of 10/11 April 1944, all from an RAF Bomber Command raid on the Aulnoye-Aymeries rail marshalling yard on the Franco-Belgian frontier. (Note: According to Boiten, he claimed six Lancasters shot down.) All of his seven claims were confirmed and 38 Allied aircrew were killed. This was Bergmann's most successful sortie, making him an "ace-in-a-day" for the first time.

His first aerial victory of the night was Lancaster ND586 from No. 460 Squadron RAAF was shot down at 02:20 in the vicinity of Vieux-Mareuil. At 02:30, north of Solesmes, he shot down Lancaster LL830 from No. 576 Squadron RAF, 5 minutes later followed by Lancaster ND844 from No. 12 Squadron RAF. His fourth Lancaster of the night was claimed at 02:43 north of Achiet-le-Petit. At 02:50, he attacked Lancaster JB732 from No. 103 Squadron RAF which crashed at Méharicourt. Lancaster DV288 from No. 101 Squadron RAF claimed at 02:54 became his sixth aerial victory of the night. His seventh and last Lancaster shot down that night was claimed at 03:06 over Lancaster MD636 from No. 625 Squadron RAF.

=== Knight's Cross and death ===
On 4 May 1944, Bergmann was transferred to 6. Staffel of NJG 4. That evening, he claimed five further aerial victories. (Note: According to Ziefle, Bergmann claimed six aerial victories on the night of 3/4 May 1944.) On 9 June 1944, he was awarded the Knight's Cross of the Iron Cross (Ritterkreuz des Eisernen Kreuzes) following his 34th aerial victory. The award documentation was signed on 27 September 1944, at the time, Bergmann and his crew were considered missing in action.

On 6 August 1944, Bergmann and his crew - radar operator Feldwebel Gunter Hauthal and air gunner Feldwebel Willie Schopp - were shot down and killed in their Bf 110 G-4 (Werknummer 140320) at Mortain on the Cotentin Peninsula. Flight Lieutenant John Surman, flying a Mosquito of No. 604 Squadron RAF, may have shot them down as he claimed a Bf 110 destroyed. However, friendly fire from the 1st SS Leibstandarte Panzer division who were launching Operation Lüttich, the counterattack at Mortain may have been responsible. Following the battle, his remains were found and temporarily buried. He was later reinterred at the Marigny German war cemetery (Block 3—Row 31—Grave 1182).

== Summary of career ==
=== Aerial victory claims ===
According to Spick, Bergmann was credited with 36 nocturnal aerial victories, claimed in approximately 135 combat missions. Foreman, Mathews and Parry, authors of Luftwaffe Night Fighter Claims 1939 – 1945, list 34 nocturnal victory claims, numerically ranging from 1 to 35, not listing his 18th claim. Mathews and Foreman also published Luftwaffe Aces — Biographies and Victory Claims, listing Bergmann with 33 claims, plus two further unconfirmed claims.

Chronicle of aerial victories
This and the ♠ (Ace of spades) indicates those aerial victories which made Bergmann an "ace-in-a-day", a term which designates a fighter pilot who has shot down five or more airplanes in a single day. This and the – (dash) indicates unwitnessed aerial victory claims for which Bergmann did not receive credit. This and the ? (question mark) indicates discrepancies between Luftwaffe Night Fighter Claims 1939 – 1945 and Luftwaffe Aces — Biographies and Victory Claims.
Claim	Date	Time	Type	Location	Serial No./Squadron No.
– 7. Staffel of Nachtjagdgeschwader 4 –
1	20 September 1942	00:01	Whitley	10 km (6.2 mi) south of Verdun	
2	29 November 1942	00:49	Stirling	2 km (1.2 mi) east of Laon	
3	6 December 1942	21:54	Wellington	36 km (22 mi) northeast of Laon	
– III. Gruppe of Nachtjagdgeschwader 4 –
4	8 March 1943	22:13	Stirling	8 km (5.0 mi) northwest of Verdun	BK697/No. 15 Squadron RAF
5	9 March 1943	22:13	Stirling	vicinity of Charleville	R9149/No. 7 Squadron RAF
6	11 April 1943	01:40	Halifax	6.5 km (4.0 mi) north of Sedan	DT806/No. 35 Squadron RAF
7	15 April 1943	02:55	Wellington	5 km (3.1 mi) southwest of Saint-Quentin	HE733/No. 425 (Alouette) Squadron RCAF
8	15 April 1943	03:22	Halifax	15 km (9.3 mi) southwest of Saint-Quentin	BB311/No. 408 (Goose) Squadron RCAF
9	16 April 1943	23:03	Halifax	Sevigry	W7873/No. 35 Squadron RAF
10	16 April 1943	23:31	Stirling	8 km (5.0 mi) east of Brunnchemmer	BF474/No. 15 Squadron RAF
11	16 April 1943	23:56	Wellington	vicinity of Rethel	HE501/No. 466 Squadron RAAF
12	17 April 1943	02:19	Halifax	west of Hamm	
– Nachtjagdgeschwader 1 –
13? (Note: According to Luftwaffe Aces — Biographies and Victory Claims claimed while flying with III. Gruppe of Nachtjagdgeschwader 4 while Luftwaffe Night Fighter Claims 1939 – 1945 states Nachtjagdgeschwader 1.)	12 June 1943	02:02	Lancaster	Zandbergen	
14?	13 June 1943	02:21	Lancaster	4 km (2.5 mi) southeast of Tubbergen	ED828/No. 50 Squadron RAF
– III. Gruppe of Nachtjagdgeschwader 4 –
15? (Note: According to Luftwaffe Aces — Biographies and Victory Claims, this claim is unconfirmed.)	25 June 1943	03:02	Stirling	northern point of Walcheren	
– 8. Staffel of Nachtjagdgeschwader 4 –
16	28 August 1943	01:04	Halifax	southwest of Echternacht; Luxembourg	
17	12 November 1943	01:00	Halifax	25 km (16 mi) west of Châteaudun	LW321/No. 78 Squadron RAF
18	18 November 1943	19:24	Halifax	northeast of Châlons-sur-Marne	
19	18 November 1943	19:49	Stirling	northeast of Châlons-sur-Marne	EF128/No. 622 Squadron RAF
20♠	11 April 1944	02:20	Lancaster	Vieux-Mareuil	ND586/No. 460 Squadron RAAF
21♠	11 April 1944	02:30	Lancaster	6 km (3.7 mi) north of Solesmes	LL830/No. 576 Squadron RAF
22♠	11 April 1944	02:35	Lancaster	1 km (0.62 mi) southeast of Sailly	ND844/No. 12 Squadron RAF
23♠	11 April 1944	02:43	Lancaster	north-northwest of Achiet-le-Petit	LL836/No. 12 Squadron RAF
24♠	11 April 1944	02:50	Lancaster	Beauquesne	JB732/No. 103 Squadron RAF
25♠	11 April 1944	02:54	Lancaster	vicinity of Vignacourt	DV288/No. 101 Squadron RAF
26♠	11 April 1944	03:06	Lancaster	north of Guignemicourt	MD636/No. 625 Squadron RAF
27	27 April 1944	00:50	Lancaster	15 km (9.3 mi) southeast of Saint-Dizier	
28	27 April 1944	00:57	Lancaster	30 km (19 mi) east of Saint-Dizier	
29	27 April 1944	01:01	Lancaster	15 km (9.3 mi) southwest of Toul	
30♠	4 May 1944	00:10	Lancaster	30 km (19 mi) south-southeast of Champlain	
31♠	4 May 1944	00:15	Lancaster	50–60 km (31–37 mi) southeast of Champlain	
32♠	4 May 1944	00:22	Lancaster	60–70 km (37–43 mi) southeast of Champlain	
— (Note: This unconfirmed claim is not listed in Luftwaffe Night Fighter Claims 1939 – 1945.)	4 May 1944	00:24	Lancaster		
33♠	4 May 1944	00:26	Lancaster	north of Paris	
34♠	4 May 1944	00:39	Lancaster	north of Paris	

=== Awards ===
- Honour Goblet of the Luftwaffe (Ehrenpokal der Luftwaffe) on 25 June 1943 as Leutnant and pilot
- German Cross in Gold on 17 October 1943 as Oberleutnant in the 8./Nachtjagdgeschwader 4
- Knight's Cross of the Iron Cross on 9 June 1944 as Hauptmann and Staffelkapitän of the 8./Nachtjagdgeschwader 4

== See also ==
- Wilhelm Herget - claimed eight RAF bombers in just 50 minutes during a raid against Frankfurt on the night of 20 December 1943.
