= Peter Spoden =

German air force pilot (1921–2021)

- Born: 8 November 1921; Borken, Westphalia, Prussia, Germany
- Died: 9 December 2021 (aged 100); Kronberg, Hesse, Germany
- Military career
- Allegiance: Nazi Germany
- Branch: Luftwaffe
- Service years: 1940–45
- Rank: Hauptmann
- Units: NJG 5, NJG 6
- Commands: I./NJG 6
- Conflicts: World War II: Western Front; Defence of the Reich
- Awards: German Cross in Gold
- Other work: Airline Captain

Peter Spoden (8 November 1921 – 9 December 2021) was a German night fighter ace during World War II. (Note: For a list of Luftwaffe night fighter aces see List of German World War II night fighter aces)

== Biography ==
Spoden was born in Borken. He was credited with 24 night victories and bearer of the German Cross in Gold. Spoden was member of night fighter units NJG 5 and NJG 6 and appointed to Gruppenkommandeur of I./NJG 6 at the end of war. In 1945, despite orders to hold Schleißheim Airfield in ground combat against the advancing Allies, he surrendered the installation to US forces, pre-empting a devastating artillery strike and ground battle.

After 1 April 1955, with the re-establishment of the now West German airline Lufthansa on 6 January 1953, he became Captain on the DC-3 and the famous Lockheed L-1049 Super Constellation, later on Boeing 720, Boeing 707 and Boeing 747. He trained hundreds of commercial pilots until his retirement in 1981. In May 1999, Spoden revealed that a historian once showed him the passenger lists of his wartime victories. He spoke of his "horror" when realising that many of the men he killed were no older than his own sons.

Spoden turned 100 in November 2021, and died the following month.

== Bibliography ==
- Spoden, Peter (2003). Enemy in the Dark: The Story of a Luftwaffe Night-Fighter Pilot. Cerberus Publishing Ltd. ISBN 978-1-8414-5032-2.
