= Wilhelm Beier =

German World War II flying ace

- Beier as an Oberfeldwebel
- Born: 18 November 1913; Homberg
- Died: 12 July 1977 (aged 63); Moers
- Military career
- Allegiance: Nazi Germany
- Branch: Luftwaffe
- Service years: ?–1945
- Rank: Oberleutnant (first lieutenant)
- Units: NJG 2 NJG 1
- Conflicts: World War II: Defense of the Reich
- Awards: Knight's Cross of the Iron Cross

Wilhelm Beier (18 November 1913 – 12 July 1977) was a Luftwaffe night fighter ace and recipient of the Knight's Cross of the Iron Cross during World War II. The Knight's Cross of the Iron Cross, and its variants were the highest awards in the military and paramilitary forces of Nazi Germany during World War II. Depending on source, Beier claimed 38 nocturnal aerial victories, including 14 of which flying intruder missions, intercepting bombers on their return flight to England.

== Career ==
Beier was born on 18 November 1913 in Homberg, present-day part of Duisburg, at the time in the Rhine Province within the German Empire.

=== Night fighter career ===
A map of part of the Kammhuber Line. The 'belt' and night fighter 'boxes' are shown.

Following the 1939 aerial Battle of the Heligoland Bight, Royal Air Force (RAF) attacks shifted to the cover of darkness, initiating the Defense of the Reich campaign. By mid-1940, Generalmajor (Brigadier General) Josef Kammhuber had established a night air defense system dubbed the Kammhuber Line. It consisted of a series of control sectors equipped with radars and searchlights and an associated night fighter. Each sector named a Himmelbett (canopy bed) would direct the night fighter into visual range with target bombers. In 1941, the Luftwaffe started equipping night fighters with airborne radar such as the Lichtenstein radar. This airborne radar did not come into general use until early 1942.

On 10 April 1941, Beier claimed his second aerial victory, a Armstrong Whitworth Whitley bomber shot down near Chelmsford on an intruder mission over England.

Beier was awarded the Knight's Cross of the Iron Cross (Ritterkreuz des Eisernen Kreuzes) on 10 October 1941 for 14 nocturnal aerial victories. The presentation was made by Kammhuber, at the time commanding general of XII. Fliegerkorps (12th Air Corps), at Gilze-Rijen Airfield. On the night of 29/30 May 1943, the RAF attacked Wuppertal with 719 bombers. Defending against this attack, Beier claimed the Handley Page Halifax bomber HR793 from No. XXXV (Madras Presidency) Squadron shot down which crashed near Limbricht.

== Summary of career ==
=== Aerial victory claims ===
According to Aders, Beier was credited with 36 nocturnal aerial victories. Spick also lists him with 36 aerial victories while Obermaier lists him with 38 aerial victories. Both Obermaier and Spick state that Beier flew about 250 combat missions. Foreman, Parry and Mathews, authors of Luftwaffe Night Fighter Claims 1939 – 1945, researched the German Federal Archives and found records for 37 nocturnal victory claims, numerically ranging from 1 to 31, and 33 to 38. Mathews and Foreman also published Luftwaffe Aces — Biographies and Victory Claims, also listing Beier with 37 claims.

Chronicle of aerial victories
This and the ? (question mark) indicates discrepancies between Luftwaffe Night Fighter Claims 1939 – 1945 and Luftwaffe Aces — Biographies and Victory Claims.
Claim	Date	Time	Type	Location	Serial No./Squadron No.
– 3. Staffel of Nachtjagdgeschwader 2 –
1	7 December 1940	06:36	Hurricane	5 km (3.1 mi) east of Spilsby	
2	10 April 1941	02:35	Whitley	Chelmsford	
3	8 May 1941	02:50	Wellington	Wells-next-the-Sea	
4	11 May 1941	03:46	Blenheim	50 km (31 mi) east of Scarborough	
5	4 June 1941	01:35	Blenheim	20 km (12 mi) southeast of Lowestoft	
6	13 June 1941	00:44	Defiant	vicinity of Thornby	
7	6 July 1941	03:08	Wellington	110 km (68 mi) north-northwest of Texel	
8	6 July 1941	03:36	Blenheim	100 km (62 mi) west of Texel	
9	6 July 1941	23:54	Whitley	60 km (37 mi) northeast of Bacton	
10	6 July 1941	23:58	Whitley	60 km (37 mi) northeast of Bacton	
11	18 July 1941	03:02	Blenheim	120 km (75 mi) northeast of Great Yarmouth	
12	8 August 1941	03:20	Blenheim	East Dereham	
13	8 August 1941	03:44	Halifax	200 km (120 mi) east of Withernsea	
14	8 August 1941	03:48	Wellington	200 km (120 mi) east of Flamborough Head	
– Ergänzungsgruppe of Nachtjagdgeschwader 2 –
15	23 April 1942	01:15	Boston		
16	31 May 1942	02:07	Wellington		
17	31 May 1942	02:25	Wellington		
18	23 June 1942	03:01	Stirling		
– 9. Staffel of Nachtjagdgeschwader 2 –
19	27 July 1942	01:32	Havoc	24 km (15 mi) northeast of Eindhoven	
20	29 July 1942	03:20	Wellington	20 km (12 mi) north of Enschede	Wellington X3710/No. 156 Squadron RAF
21	28 August 1942	00:25	Boston	40 km (25 mi) west of IJmuiden	
22	29 August 1942	03:16	Manchester	northeast of Moerbeke	
23	3 September 1942	03:08	Stirling	40 km (25 mi) west of Den Haag	
24	7 September 1942	04:49	Manchester		
25	7 September 1942	05:03	Halifax		
26	7 September 1942	05:11	Wellington		
27	11 September 1942	01:19	Wellington	50 km (31 mi) west of Katwijk-an-See	
28	17 September 1942	01:12	Boston		
29	17 September 1942	01:13	Boston		
30	17 September 1942	01:37	Stirling		
– 8. Staffel of Nachtjagdgeschwader 2 –
31	30 September 1942	00:19	Beaufighter		
– 10. Staffel of Nachtjagdgeschwader 2 –
32? (Note: This claim is listed as Beier's 32nd aerial victory in Luftwaffe Aces — Biographies and Victory Claims, while this claim is listed as his 33rd claim in Luftwaffe Night Fighter Claims 1939 – 1945 confirm this claim.)	15 October 1942	22:13	B-24	50 km (31 mi) west of Den Haag	
33	15 October 1942	22:16	Stirling	70 km (43 mi) west of Den Haag	
34	15 October 1942	22:19	Stirling	50 km (31 mi) west of Den Haag	
35	15 October 1942	22:52	Manchester	50 km (31 mi) west of Leiden	Lancaster W4130/No. 57 Squadron RAF
36	13 May 1943	02:30	Halifax	16 km (9.9 mi) north-northwest of Amsterdam	
37	30 May 1943	00:27	Halifax	20 km (12 mi) north-northwest of Maastricht	Halifax HR793/No. XXXV (Madras Presidency) Squadron

=== Awards ===
- Front Flying Clasp of the Luftwaffe
- Iron Cross (1939) 2nd and 1st Class
- Knight's Cross of the Iron Cross on 10 October 1941 as Oberfeldwebel and Flugzeugführer (pilot) in the 3./Nachtjagdgeschwader 2
- German Cross in Gold on 19 September 1942 as Oberfeldwebel in the 3./Nachtjagdgeschwader 2
- Mentioned in the Wehrmachtbericht on 23 April 1942
