= Fellerer =

Fellerer is a German surname. Notable people with the surname include:

- Karl Gustav Fellerer (1902–1984), German musicologist
- Leopold Fellerer (1919–1968), Vienna-born German fighter pilot
