= Herbert Lütje =

German flying ace

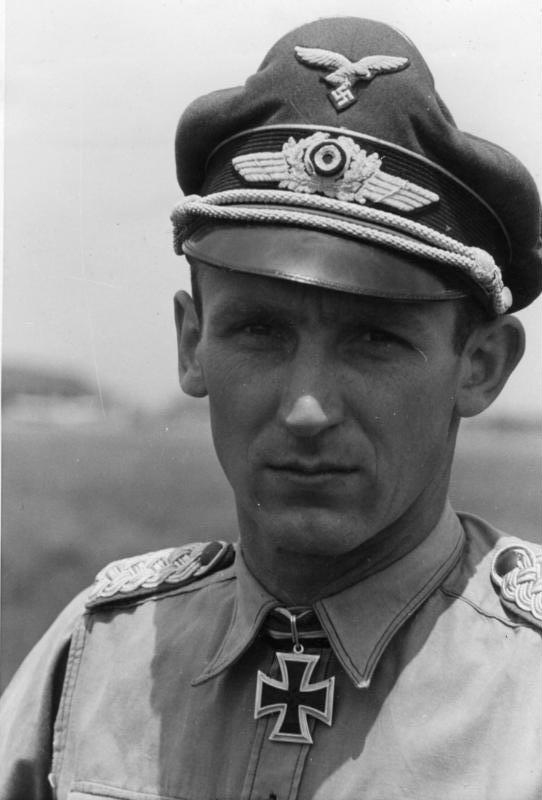
- Herbert Lütje
- Born: 30 January 1918; Abbesbüttel/Gifhorn, Germany
- Died: 18 January 1967 (aged 48); Cologne-Wahn, Germany
- Military career
- Allegiance: Nazi Germany (to 1945); West Germany
- Branch: Luftwaffe; German Air Force
- Service years: 1937–45, 1957–
- Rank: Oberstleutnant (Wehrmacht); Oberst (Bundeswehr)
- Units: LG 2, JG 2, NJG 1, NJG 6
- Commands: 8./NJG 1, IV./NJG 6, NJG 6
- Conflicts: World War II: Norwegian campaign; Battle of France; Defense of the Reich
- Awards: Knight's Cross of the Iron Cross with Oak Leaves

Herbert Heinrich Otto Lütje (30 January 1918 – 18 January 1967) was a German military aviator, a wing commander in the Luftwaffe during World War II and an officer in the postwar German Air Force. As a fighter ace, he was credited with 50 aerial victories claimed in 247 combat missions. His 47 nocturnal claims made him the twentyfourth most successful night fighter pilot in the history of aerial warfare. All of his victories were claimed in Defense of the Reich missions, the majority at night against the Royal Air Force's (RAF) Bomber Command and three daytime claims, one over a United States Army Air Forces (USAAF) Boeing B-17 Flying Fortress bomber and two Lockheed P-38 Lightning fighter aircraft.

Born in Abbesbüttel, Lütje grew up in the Weimar Republic and Nazi Germany. Following graduation from school, he joined the military service in 1937 and was trained as a pilot. In 1939 and 1940 he served with the night-fighter squadron of Lehrgeschwader 2 (LG 2—2nd Demonstration Wing) and Jagdgeschwader 2 "Richthofen" (JG 2—2nd Fighter Wing) during the Norwegian campaign and Battle of France. Following the units reorganization, he served with III. Gruppe (3rd group) of Nachtjagdgeschwader 1 (NJG 1—1st Night Fighter Wing). Lütje claimed his first aerial victory on the night of 6/7 September 1942 and was appointed squadron leader of 8. Staffel (8th squadron) of NJG 1 in May 1943. Following his 28th aerial victory, he was awarded the Knight's Cross of the Iron Cross on 1 June 1943, shortly after he was given command IV. Gruppe of Nachtjagdgeschwader 6 (NJG 6—6th Night Fighter Wing). He was appointed Geschwaderkommodore (wing commander) of NJG 6 in October 1944. On 17 April 1945, he was awarded the Knight's Cross of the Iron Cross with Oak Leaves.

Following the rearmament of the Federal Republic of Germany, Lütje joined the German Air Force in July 1957. He died on 18 January 1967 in Cologne-Wahn.

== Early life and career ==
Lütje was born on 30 January 1918 in Abbesbüttel, at the time in the Province of Hanover, as part of the German Empire. He was the son of a farmer. After graduation from school, Lütje joined the Luftwaffe on 1 November 1937 as a Fahnenjunker (cadet) and attended the Luftkriegsschule 2 in Berlin-Gatow. Following flight training, (Note: Flight training in the Luftwaffe progressed through the levels A1, A2 and B1, B2, referred to as A/B flight training. A training included theoretical and practical training in aerobatics, navigation, long-distance flights and dead-stick landings. The B courses included high-altitude flights, instrument flights, night landings and training to handle the aircraft in difficult situations. For pilots destined to fly multi-engine aircraft, the training was completed with the Luftwaffe Advanced Pilot's Certificate (Erweiterter Luftwaffen-Flugzeugführerschein), also known as the C-Certificate.) he was promoted to Leutnant (second lieutenant) on 1 August 1939. In December 1939, he was transferred to the night fighter squadron of Lehrgeschwader 2 (LG 2—2nd Demonstration Wing).

== World War II ==
World War II in Europe began on Friday, 1 September 1939, when German forces invaded Poland. In February 1940, the night fighter squadron was absorbed by the VI. (Nacht) Gruppe (4th night fighter group) of Jagdgeschwader 2 "Richthofen" (JG 2—2nd Fighter Wing). (Note: For an explanation of the meaning of Luftwaffe unit designation see Organisation of the Luftwaffe during World War II.) There, Lütje was assigned to the 12. Staffel (12th squadron). Flying with this squadron, he participated in the Norwegian Campaign. On 24 April 1940, 12. Staffel was ordered to Aalborg where it stayed until May. From Aalborg, the unit flew patrol missions along the Danish coast. On 31 May, 12. Staffel was ordered back to Germany, arriving in Jever on 2 June. The Staffel then moved to Köln-Ostheim airfield, flying night-fighter missions during the Battle of France. In total, Lütje flew three missions over Norway and 19 missions during the Battle of France on the Messerschmitt Bf 109 D single engined fighter.

=== Night fighter career ===
A map of part of the Kammhuber Line. The 'belt' and night fighter 'boxes' are shown.

Following the 1939 aerial Battle of the Heligoland Bight, Royal Air Force (RAF) attacks shifted to the cover of darkness, initiating the Defence of the Reich campaign. By mid-1940, Generalmajor (Brigadier General) Josef Kammhuber had established a night air defense system dubbed the Kammhuber Line. It consisted of a series of control sectors equipped with radars and searchlights and an associated night fighter. Each sector named a Himmelbett (canopy bed) would direct the night fighter into visual range with target bombers. In 1941, the Luftwaffe started equipping night fighters with airborne radar such as the Lichtenstein radar. This airborne radar did not come into general use until early 1942.

Following the campaign in Norway and France, VI.(N)/JG 2 was moved to Mönchengladbach in late June. There, the unit was outfitted with the Bf 109 E, equipped with the navigational direction finder PeilG IV direction finder (PeilG - Peilgerät). The objective was to test single-engined fighter aircraft as night-fighters. During this test phase, VI.(N)/JG 2 was integrated in the newly formed Nachtjagdgeschwader 1 (NJG 1—1st Night Fighter Wing) on 26 June 1940. On 1 July, the Gruppe was officially designated III. Gruppe (3rd Group) of NJG 1 and converted to the twin-engined Messerschmitt Bf 110 heavy fighter.

At the time, Lütje was assigned to the Stab of III. Gruppe. Flying his 49th night fighter mission, he claimed his first nocturnal aerial victory on the night of 6/7 September 1941. The claim was filed over an Armstrong Whitworth Whitley bomber in the vicinity of Metelen. With five aerial victories to his credit, he was appointed Staffelkapitän (Squadron Leader) of the 8. Staffel of NJG 1 (8th Squadron of the 1st Night Fighter Wing) on 1 May 1942. On 28 September 1942, he received the Honor Goblet of the Luftwaffe (Ehrenpokal der Luftwaffe) and was promoted to Hauptmann (captain) on 1 October. By the end of 1942, his number of aerial victories had increased to 16.

Lütje claimed a Boeing B-17 Flying Fortress bomber shot down during a day time mission against the United States Army Air Forces (USAAF) on 4 March 1943. He achieved his 20th aerial victory on the night of 12/13 March 1943. Lütje was awarded the Knight's Cross of the Iron Cross (Ritterkreuz des Eisernen Kreuzes) on 1 June 1943 after he had shot down six British and Canadian bombers on the night of 13/14 May 1943. Among them was a Royal Air Force (RAF) Avro Lancaster from No. 57 Squadron piloted by Pilot Officer Jan Bernand Marinus Haye on a mission to bomb the Škoda Works at Plzeň. The bomber was set on fire and the crew bailed out safely.

He was then appointed Gruppenkommandeur (Group Commander) of the newly formed IV. Gruppe (4th Group) of Nachtjagdgeschwader 6 (NJG 6—6th Night Fighter Wing) in June 1943. IV./NJG 6 was based in Rumania and tasked with the protection of the Romanian oil fields. In September 1943 he flew a number of combat missions out of the Netherlands claiming four aerial victories.

Over Romania he again fought the USAAF during daytime sorties. Fighting the Fifteenth Air Force he shot down two P-38 Lightnings—one of them by his radio operator with the MG 81Z—on 10 June 1944. His Bf 110 G-4 (Werknummer 140018—factory number) was severely damaged. He and his wireless radio operator Oberfeldwebel (Sergeant) August Bogumil were wounded and had to make a forced landing. Over Romania, Lütje was credited with six Vickers Wellington bombers and one Soviet Ilyushin Il-4 aircraft over the Black Sea during nocturnal combat missions. At the end of August 1944 IV./NJ 6 was relocated back to Germany.

Lütje was appointed Geschwaderkommodore (Wing Commander) of NJG 6 on 13 September 1944, succeeding Major Heinrich Griese. Command of IV. Gruppe was passed on to Hauptmann Martin Becker. Lütje claimed his final eight aerial victories in 1945. On 15 March, he was nominated for the Knight's Cross of the Iron Cross with Oak Leaves (Ritterkreuz des Eisernen Kreuzes mit Eichenlaub). The nomination of the Oak Leaves was approved on 31 March and were awarded on 17 April 1945 after 50 aerial victories on 17 April 1945, the 836th officer or soldier of the Wehrmacht so honored. At the end of war he was taken prisoner of war and released in June 1945.

== Later life ==
Following the Wiederbewaffnung (rearmament) of the Federal Republic of Germany, Lütje joined the German Air Force in July 1957. He retired holding the rank of Oberst (colonel) and died on 18 January 1967 in Cologne-Wahn.

== Summary of career ==
=== Aerial victory claims ===
According Spick, Lütje was credited with 53 aerial victories, including two by day and 51 by night, claimed in approximately 150 combat missions. Foreman, Parry and Mathews, authors of Luftwaffe Night Fighter Claims 1939 – 1945, researched the German Federal Archives and found records for 50 victory claims. Mathews and Foreman also published Luftwaffe Aces — Biographies and Victory Claims, listing Lütje with 46 claims, plus five further unconfirmed claims and one by his air gunner Oberfeldwebel Bogumil.

Chronicle of aerial victories
This and the ♠ (Ace of spades) indicates those aerial victories which made Lütje an "ace-in-a-day", a term which designates a fighter pilot who has shot down five or more airplanes in a single day. This and the – (dash) indicates unwitnessed aerial victory claims for which Lütje did not receive credit. This along with the * (asterisk) indicates that the aircraft was shot down by Lütje's air gunner. This and the ? (question mark) indicates information discrepancies listed in Luftwaffe Night Fighter Claims 1939 – 1945 but not in Luftwaffe Aces — Biographies and Victory Claims.
Claim	Date	Time	Type	Location	Serial No./Squadron No.
– III. Gruppe of Nachtjagdgeschwader 1 –
1	6 September 1941	23:22	Whitley	Metelen	
2	20 September 1941	22:18	Wellington	1 km (0.62 mi) west of Bad Bentheim	
3	8 November 1941	00:04	Halifax	4 km (2.5 mi) east of Terlet Airfield	Halifax L9603/No. XXXV (Madras Presidency) Squadron
4	26 March 1942	23:50	Wellington	2 km (1.2 mi) north of Vriezenveen	Wellington Z1143/No. 214 (Federated Malay States) Squadron
5	4 June 1942	02:25	Wellington		
– 8. Staffel of Nachtjagdgeschwader 1 –
6	20 June 1942	02:32	Wellington	5 km (3.1 mi) southwest of Raalte	
7	26 June 1942	00:58	Wellington	100 km (62 mi) northeast of Nordhorn	Wellington DV951/No. 12 Operational Training Unit RAF
8	3 July 1942	01:40	Wellington	3 km (1.9 mi) north of Nordhorn	
9	26 July 1942	02:01	Wellington	Wielen	Wellington Z1462/No. 460 Squadron RAAF
10	10 August 1942	04:18	Wellington	8 km (5.0 mi) northwest of Wierden	Wellington BJ608/No. 150 Squadron RAF
11	18 August 1942	01:38	Lancaster	3 km (1.9 mi) west of Emlichheim	
12	27 August 1942	23:45	Wellington	3 km (1.9 mi) southeast of Rechteren Castle	Wellington Z1212/No. 460 Squadron RAAF
13	5 September 1942	02:53	Wellington	northeast of Altenkeine	
14	5 September 1942	03:59	Stirling	8 km (5.0 mi) northwest of Hasselt	Stirling BF337/No. 214 (Federated Malay States) Squadron
15	16 September 1942	23:22	Wellington	1 km (0.62 mi) north of Ahaus	Wellington Z1084/No. 22 Operational Training Unit RAF
16	17 December 1942	21:10	Lancaster	6 km (3.7 mi) northeast of Zwolle	
17	2 March 1943	00:08	Halifax	3 km (1.9 mi) north of Zuidlo	Halifax DT797/No. 408 Squadron
18	4 March 1943	11:31	B-17	west of Den Helder	B-17 41-24512/91st Bombardment Group
19	5 March 1943	21:35	Halifax	5 km (3.1 mi) southeast of Staphorst	Halifax HR687/No. 78 Squadron RAF
20	12 March 1943	21:18	Halifax	3 km (1.9 mi) east-southeast of Alstalte	
21	30 March 1943	04:28	Lancaster	7 km (4.3 mi) south of Raalte	Lancaster ED435/No. 49 Squadron RAF
22	3 April 1943	22:45	Lancaster	3 km (1.9 mi) west of Winterswijk	
23	3 April 1943	23:37	Halifax	22 km (14 mi) south of Zwolle	
24♠	13 May 1943	23:52	Lancaster	5 km (3.1 mi) southeast of Almelo	Lancaster ED667/No. 57 Squadron
25♠	13 May 1943	23:42	Lancaster	5 km (3.1 mi) north of Oldenzaal	Lancaster R5611/No. 106 Squadron
26♠	13 May 1943	23:54	Lancaster	3 km (1.9 mi) south of Hörstel	Lancaster W4305/No. 44 Squadron
27♠	14 May 1943	02:25	Halifax	5 km (3.1 mi) west of Dedemsvaart	Halifax JB966/No. 405 Squadron RCAF
28♠	14 May 1943	02:45	Halifax	Dalen	Halifax JD113/No. 419 Squadron RCAF
29♠	14 May 1943	02:55	Halifax	19 km (12 mi) east of Hoogeveen	Halifax JB892/No. 77 Squadron
30	3 September 1943	23:25	Lancaster	22 km (14 mi) northeast of Rheine	
—	3 September 1943	00:00	Lancaster		
31	23 September 1943	22:50	Halifax		
32	27 September 1943	23:40	Halifax	Neustadt	
– IV. Gruppe of Nachtjagdgeschwader 6 –
33	6 May 1944	01:05	Wellington	northwest of Ploiești	
34	7 May 1944	23:59	Wellington	Maroshévíz	
35	8 May 1944	00:18	Wellington	southwest of Blejești	
36	10 June 1944	08:29	P-38	south of Bucharest	
37*	10 June 1944	08:31	P-38	south of Bucharest	
38	29 June 1944	02:23	Wellington	north of Stockerau	
39? (Note: According to Mathews and Foreman, this claim was unconfirmed.)	9 August 1944	23:00	Wellington	Romania	
—	20 August 1944	23:05	Wellington	Romania	
40?	20 August 1944	23:05	Wellington	Romania	
—	22 August 1944	01:05	Il-4	Romania	
42	20 September 1944	23:30	Wellington	northeast of Lake Neusiedl	
– Stab of Nachtjagdgeschwader 6 –
43	2 February 1945	23:24	Lancaster	west of Karlsruhe	
44	14 February 1945	20:27	Lancaster	50 km (31 mi) northeast of Frankfurt am Main	
45	21 February 1945	20:43	Halifax	southwest of Worms	
46	21 February 1945	20:55	Halifax	Saarbrücken	
47	14 March 1945	21:24	Lancaster	northwest of Nürnberg	
48	16 March 1945	21:33	Lancaster	30 km (19 mi) south-southwest of Nürnberg	
49	19 March 1945	04:45	Lancaster		
50	21 March 1945	04:59	Lancaster		

=== Awards ===
- Honour Goblet of the Luftwaffe on 28 September 1942 as Oberleutnant and Staffelkapitän
- German Cross in Gold on 28 January 1943 as Hauptmann in the 8./Nachtjagdgeschwader 1
- Knight's Cross of the Iron Cross with Oak Leaves
  - Knight's Cross on 1 June 1943 as Hauptmann and Staffelkapitän of the 8./Nachtjagdgeschwader 1
  - 836th Oak Leaves on 17 April 1945 as Major and Geschwaderkommodore of Nachtjagdgeschwader 6

== Notes ==
Military offices
Preceded by Major Heinrich Griese	Commander of Nachtjagdgeschwader 6; 13 September 1944 – 8 May 1945	Unit disbanded
