= Paul-Hubert Rauh =

German fighter ace and Knight's Cross recipient (1913–2005)

- Born: 15 November 1913; Wolkersdorf, Austria
- Died: 30 August 2005 (aged 91); Pitten, Austria
- Military career
- Allegiance: First Austrian Republic (to 1934); Federal State of Austria (to 1938); Nazi Germany (to 1945); Second Austrian Republic
- Branch: Luftwaffe; Austrian Air Force
- Service years: 1933–1945; 1956–1974
- Rank: Major (Wehrmacht); Oberst (Bundesheer)
- Units: NJG 1 NJG 4
- Commands: II./Nachtjagdgeschwader 4
- Conflicts: World War II: Defense of the Reich
- Awards: Knight's Cross of the Iron Cross
- Other work: Steyr-Daimler-Puch

Paul-Hubert Rauh (15 November 1913 – 30 August 2005) was a Luftwaffe night fighter ace and recipient of the Knight's Cross of the Iron Cross during World War II. The Knight's Cross of the Iron Cross, and its variants were the highest awards in the military and paramilitary forces of Nazi Germany during World War II. Rauh claimed 31 aerial victories, all of them at night. (Note: For a list of Luftwaffe night fighter aces see List of German World War II night fighter aces.) In the 1956 he joined Bundesheer, and retired 1974 as an Oberst.

== Later life ==
Rauh was kept in British custody until his release in February 1946. Initially he worked for the Steyr-Daimler-Puch. In 1956, Rauh joined the military service of the Austrian Air Force (Österreichische Luftstreitkräfte) holding the rank of Hauptmann (captain). He served as flight instructor with Fliegerregiment 1 (1st Flight Regiment). In 1958, he was promoted to Major (major) and in 1961 was transferred to the Kommando der Luftstreitkäfte (Air Force Command) where for the following 13 years he was tasked with procurement. He was promoted to Oberstleutnant (lieutenant colonel) in 1967 and to Oberst (colonel) in 1972. His main obligation was equipment and supplies for airfields and fueling. Rauh retired in 1974.

== Aerial victory claims ==
Rauh was credited with 31 nocturnal aerial victories, 29 of which were four-engined bombers, claimed in 152 combat missions.

Chronicle of aerial victories
Victory	Date	Time	Type	Location	Serial No./Squadron No.
– 4./Nachtjagdgeschwader 1 –
1	28 April 1942	00:37	Wellington	Montplaisir	Wellington W5627/No. 304 Polish Bomber Squadron
– 9./Nachtjagdgeschwader 4 –
2	7 May 1942	00:25	Halifax		
3	19 May 1942	23:51	Wellington		Wellington X3671/No. 156 Squadron RAF
4	17 September 1942	00:37	Halifax	east of Maubeuge	Halifax W7770/No. 405 Squadron RCAF
– 3./Nachtjagdgeschwader 4 –
5	10 March 1943	01:56	Halifax	Wallingen	
6	14 July 1943	02:28	Lancaster	18 km (11 mi) southwest of Cambrai	Lancaster DS660/No. 115 Squadron RAF
– 6./Nachtjagdgeschwader 4 –
7	16 July 1943	01:56	Halifax	500 m (550 yd) east east Saquenay	
– 3./Nachtjagdgeschwader 4 –
8	20 December 1943	19:14	Halifax	Mannheim	
9	20 December 1943	19:20	Halifax	24 km (15 mi) west-southwest Koblenz	
10	31 March 1944	00:32	four-engined bomber	Kehlen-Giessen	
– Stab III./Nachtjagdgeschwader 4 –
11	1 June 1944	02:05	Lancaster	7 km (4.3 mi) west of Rambouillet	
12	3 June 1944	01:01	four-engined bomber	Mantes-Rambouillet	
– Stab II./Nachtjagdgeschwader 4 –
13	3 June 1944	01:10	four-engined bomber	Dreux area	
14	7 June 1944	00:20	four-engined bomber	Saint-Lô area	
15	7 June 1944	00:31	four-engined bomber	Saint-Lô area	
– II./Nachtjagdgeschwader 4 –
16	8 June 1944	02:21	Halifax	Rambouillet	
17	16 June 1944	00:51	Lancaster	Albert	
18	8 July 1944	01:32	four-engined bomber	SC-99	
19	19 July 1944	01:55	four-engined bomber	Vitry-le-François	
20	25 July 1944	00:17	Lancaster	Orléans	Lancaster PB265/No. 576 Squadron RAF
21	29 July 1944	01:07	four-engined bomber	Coulommiers	Lancaster PB198/No. 90 Squadron RAF
22	7 August 1944	23:50	four-engined bomber	Le Havre-Lisieux	
23	21 November 1944	18:45	four-engined bomber	Ruhr area	
24	21 November 1944	19:02	four-engined bomber	Ruhr area	
25	21 February 1945	01:15	four-engined bomber		
26	5 March 1945	20:22	four-engined bomber		
27	5 March 1945	20:40	four-engined bomber		
28	5 March 1945	20:50	four-engined bomber		
29	7 March 1945	20:55	Lancaster	Friesenhagen-Altenkirchen	
30	7 March 1945	21:42	Lancaster		
31	21 March 1945	04:35	Lancaster		

== Awards ==
- Flugzeugführerabzeichen
- War Merit Cross with Swords
  - 2nd Class (1 August 1940)
- Front Flying Clasp of the Luftwaffe in Gold
  - in Bronze (15 May 1942)
  - in Silver (3 December 1943)
  - in Gold (3 December 1943)
- Iron Cross (1939)
  - 2nd Class (10 June 1942)
  - 1st Class (25 September 1942)
- Wound Badge (1939)
  - in Black (30 November 1944)
- Honour Goblet of the Luftwaffe (Ehrenpokal der Luftwaffe) on 10 July 1944
- German Cross in Gold on 20 August 1944 as Hauptmann in the II./Nachtjagdgeschwader 4
- Knight's Cross of the Iron Cross on 28 April 1945 as Hauptmann and Gruppenkommandeur of the II./Nachtjagdgeschwader 4
