= Werner Hoffmann =

Werner Hoffmann may refer to:

- Werner Hoffmann (pilot born 1920) (1920–1945), Luftwaffe pilot during World War II
- Werner Hoffmann (nightfighter pilot) (1918–2011), German Luftwaffe night fighter ace
