= Ludwig Meister =

German World War II flying ace

- Born: 14 December 1919; Erbendorf
- Died: 26 November 2011 (aged 91)
- Military career
- Allegiance: Nazi Germany
- Branch: Luftwaffe
- Service years: 1939–1945
- Rank: Hauptmann (captain)
- Units: NJG 1, NJG 4
- Commands: 1./NJG 4, III./NJG 4
- Conflicts: World War II: Operation Donnerkeil; Defense of the Reich
- Awards: Knight's Cross of the Iron Cross

Ludwig Meister (14 December 1919 – 26 November 2011) was a Luftwaffe night fighter ace and recipient of the Knight's Cross of the Iron Cross (German: Ritterkreuz des Eisernen Kreuzes) during World War II. The Knight's Cross of the Iron Cross, and its variants were the highest awards in the military and paramilitary forces of Nazi Germany during World War II. During his career he claimed 39 aerial victories, 38 of them at night. (Note: For a list of Luftwaffe night fighter aces see List of German World War II night fighter aces.)

== Career ==
Meister was born on 14 December 1919 in Rohrmühle, present-day part of Erbendorf, at the time in the Free State of Bavaria within the Weimar Republic. In October 1939, Meister joined the Luftwaffe and served his basic military training with 4. Kompanie (4th company) of Fliegerausbildungs-Regiment 51 (51st Flight Training Regiment) at Weimar before he was transferred to the Air War School Klotzsche in Dresden in November. On 30 June 1940, Meister then attended the advanced Flugzeugführerschule C 9 (FFS C 9—advanced flight school) at Altenburg. (Note: Flight training in the Luftwaffe progressed through the levels A1, A2 and B1, B2, referred to as A/B flight training. A training included theoretical and practical training in aerobatics, navigation, long-distance flights and dead-stick landings. The B courses included high-altitude flights, instrument flights, night landings and training to handle the aircraft in difficult situations. For pilots destined to fly multi-engine aircraft, the training was completed with the Luftwaffe Advanced Pilot's Certificate (Erweiterter Luftwaffen-Flugzeugführerschein), also known as the C-Certificate.) He the attended the blind flying school Blindflugschule 1 (BFS 1—1st blind flying school) at Brandis, Germany from 21 February 1941. He was then posted to the Zerstörerschule (destroyer school) at Neubiberg where he received operational training on the Messerschmitt Bf 110 heavy fighter. In mid-June 1941, Meister was posted to Nachtjagdgeschwader 1 (NJG 1—Night Fighter Wing 1).

=== Night fighter career ===
A map of part of the Kammhuber Line. The 'belt' and night fighter 'boxes' are shown.

Following the 1939 aerial Battle of the Heligoland Bight, Royal Air Force (RAF) attacks shifted to the cover of darkness, initiating the Defense of the Reich campaign. By mid-1940, Generalmajor (Brigadier General) Josef Kammhuber had established a night air defense system dubbed the Kammhuber Line. It consisted of a series of control sectors equipped with radars and searchlights and an associated night fighter. Each sector named a Himmelbett (canopy bed) would direct the night fighter into visual range with target bombers. In 1941, the Luftwaffe started equipping night fighters with airborne radar such as the Lichtenstein radar. This airborne radar did not come into general use until early 1942.

The effectiveness of RAF Bomber Command to accurately hit German targets had been questioned by the War Cabinet Secretary David Bensusan-Butt who published the Butt Report in August 1941. The report in parts concluded that the British crews failed to navigate to, identify, and bomb their targets. Although the report was not widely accepted by senior RAF commanders, Prime Minister Winston Churchill, instructed Commander-in-Chief Richard Peirse that during the winter months only limited operations were to be conducted. Flight operations were also hindered by bad weather in the first months of 1942, so II. Gruppe only saw very limited action and Meister was the only pilot of II. Gruppe to claim an aerial victory during that period.

On 8 February 1942, Meister along with other pilots of II. Gruppe was transferred to Koksijde Air Base. The objective of this assignment was to give the German battleships Scharnhorst and Gneisenau and the heavy cruiser Prinz Eugen fighter protection in the breakout from Brest to Germany. The Channel Dash operation (11–13 February 1942) by the Kriegsmarine (Navy) was codenamed Operation Cerberus by the Germans. In support of this, the Luftwaffe under the leadership of General der Jagdflieger (General of the Fighter Force) Adolf Galland, formulated an air superiority plan dubbed Operation Donnerkeil for the protection of the three German capital ships. II./NJG 1 was briefed of these plans in the early morning hours on 12 February. The plan called for protection of the German ships at all costs. The crews were told that if they ran out of ammunition they must ram the enemy aircraft. To the relief of the night fighters they were assigned to the first-line reserves. The operation, which took the British by surprise, was successful and the night fighters were kept in their reserve role. On the evening of 12 February, II. Gruppe was relocated to Amsterdam Airport Schiphol. They then relocated again to Aalborg-West in Denmark from where they made a low-level flight in close formation over the Skaggerak, landing at Stavanger-Sola. Over the following days they operated from the airfield at Forus, making a short-term landing at Bergen-Herdla. In total, Schnaufer made two operational flights without contact with the enemy. Following this assignment they relocated to 5. Staffel's new base in Germany at Bonn-Hangelar via Oslo-Gardermoen, Aalborg, and Lüneburg.

On the morning of 23 March 1943, while returning from Hildesheim, Meister's aircraft was shot down by a Republic P-47 Thunderbolt near Namur, Belgium, crashing in flames at Naninne. The three crewmembers were wounded but ultimately survived.

On 11 August 1943, Meister was appointed Staffelkapitän (squadron leader) of 1. Staffel of Nachtjagdgeschwader 4 (NJG 4—Night Fighter Wing 4). On 6 December 1944, Meister was appointed Gruppenkommandeur (group commander) of III. Gruppe of NJG 4, succeeding Hauptmann Hans-Karl Kamp in this capacity.

== Summary of career ==
=== Aerial victory claims ===
According to Obermaier, Meister was credited with 39 aerial victories, 38 of which at night and over a four-engined bomber by day, claimed in 125 combat missions. Boiten lists him with 29 confirmed plus four further unconfirmed aerial victories. Foreman, Parry and Mathews, authors of Luftwaffe Night Fighter Claims 1939 – 1945, researched the German Federal Archives and found records for 39 nocturnal victory claims. Mathews and Foreman also published Luftwaffe Aces — Biographies and Victory Claims, listing Meister with 32 claims plus four further unconfirmed claims.

Chronicle of aerial victories
This and the ? (question mark) indicates discrepancies between Luftwaffe Night Fighter Claims 1939 – 1945 and Luftwaffe Aces — Biographies and Victory Claims.
Claim	Date	Time	Type	Location	Serial No./Squadron No.
– 5. Staffel of Nachtjagdgeschwader 1 –
1	30 November 1941	22:21	Halifax	5 km (3.1 mi) south of Bramstedt	
2	30 November 1941	22:25	Whitley	30 km (19 mi) northwest of Stade	
3? (Note: According to Luftwaffe Aces — Biographies and Victory Claims, this claim was unconfirmed while Luftwaffe Night Fighter Claims 1939 – 1945 confirm this claim.)	30 November 1941	23:25	Wellington	Hamburg	
– 8. Staffel of Nachtjagdgeschwader 4 –
4	29 August 1942	00:12	Wellington	north-northeast of Worms	
5? (Note: This claim is not listed in Luftwaffe Aces — Biographies and Victory Claims.)	29 August 1942	00:15	Wellington	Bad Kreuznach	
6	29 August 1942	00:43	Stirling	Allenbach	
– 1. Staffel of Nachtjagdgeschwader 4 –
7	25 October 1942	02:54	Wellington	9 km (5.6 mi) southeast of Valenciennes	
8	22 November 1942	23:48	Lancaster	Le Tilleul-Lambert	
9?	21 December 1942	23:00	Stirling		
10	9 March 1943	00:30	Halifax	9 km (5.6 mi) east of Le Cateau	Halifax W7851/No. XXXV (Madras Presidency) Squadron
11	17 April 1943	04:08	Halifax	northwest of Saint-Hubert	
12	30 May 1943	02:07	Stirling	3 km (1.9 mi) southwest of Cambrai	Stirling EF349/No. 90 Squadron RAF
13	26 June 1943	01:23	Stirling	3 km (1.9 mi) southwest of Aalter	
14	4 July 1943	02:40	Halifax	vicinity of Rance	Halifax JD262/No. 51 Squadron RAF
15?	14 July 1943	02:30	Halifax	Vossigny-la-Victoire	
16	28 August 1943	01:35	Lancaster	Wolpertshausen	
17	28 August 1943	01:57	four-engined bomber	vicinity of Nuremberg	
18	4 October 1943	21:02	Halifax	Neuerburg	
19?	4 October 1943	21:03	Halifax	Trier	
20	3 November 1943	19:57	Halifax	21 km (13 mi) west-northwest of Cologne	
21	23 November 1943	20:16	Halifax	central Berlin; Grebs	
22	20 December 1943	19:12	Halifax	10 km (6.2 mi) south of Euskirchen	
23	2 January 1944	05:00	Lancaster	10 km (6.2 mi) northwest of Saint-Pol	
24	2 January 1944	05:15	Lancaster	southeast of Mons	
25	2 January 1944	05:51	Lancaster	west of Saint-Pol	
26	2 January 1944	06:00	Halifax	west of Saint-Pol	
27?	7 January 1944	13:00	B-17	Cambrai	
28	20 January 1944	19:20	Halifax	10 km (6.2 mi) southwest of Liebenwalde	
29	20 January 1944	19:37	Halifax	25 km (16 mi) northeast of Neuruppin	
30	20 February 1944	02:48	Lancaster	13 km (8.1 mi) northeast of Celle	
31	20 February 1944	03:19	Lancaster	Wesendorf	
32	21 February 1944	03:17	Lancaster	vicinity of Rastatt	
33	25 February 1944	20:55	Lancaster	25 km (16 mi) west of Rethel	
34	25 February 1944	20:59	Lancaster	13 km (8.1 mi) southeast of Rethel	
35	25 February 1944	21:14	Lancaster	23 km (14 mi) south of Vouziers	
36	16 March 1944	01:18	Halifax	south of Aachen	
37	16 March 1944	01:30	Lancaster	23 km (14 mi) south of Berine	
38	22 March 1944	21:51	four-engined bomber	Gütersloh	
– III. Gruppe of Nachtjagdgeschwader 4 –
39	7 March 1945	20:30	Lancaster	north of Kassel	

=== Awards ===
- Flugzeugführerabzeichen
- Iron Cross (1939) 2nd and 1st Class
- Front Flying Clasp of the Luftwaffe in Gold
- Honour Goblet of the Luftwaffe (Ehrenpokal der Luftwaffe) on 23 August 1943 as Oberleutnant and pilot
- German Cross in Gold on 28 January 1944 as Oberleutnant in the 1./Nachtjagdgeschwader 4
- Knight's Cross of the Iron Cross on 9 June 1944 as Hauptmann and Staffelkapitän of the 1./Nachtjagdgeschwader 4
