= Leopold Fellerer =

Austrian Luftwaffe fighter ace

- Born: 7 June 1919; Vienna, Austria
- Died: 16 July 1968 (aged 49); Mautern, Austria
- Military career
- Allegiance: Nazi Germany (to 1945); Austria
- Branch: Luftwaffe; Austrian Air Force
- Service years: 1937–1945; 1950s–1968
- Rank: Hauptmann (Luftwaffe); Oberstleutnant (Austrian Air Force)
- Units: NJG 1, NJG 2, NJG 5, NJG 6
- Commands: II./NJG 5, III./NJG 6
- Conflicts: World War II; Defense of the Reich
- Awards: Knight's Cross of the Iron Cross

Leopold "Poldi" Fellerer (7 June 1919 – 16 July 1968) was a Luftwaffe night fighter ace and recipient of the Knight's Cross of the Iron Cross during World War II. The Knight's Cross of the Iron Cross, and its variants were the highest awards in the military and paramilitary forces of Nazi Germany during World War II.

== Early life and career ==
Fellerer, the son of a Beamter, was born on 7 June 1919 in Vienna, Austria. In 1937, he applied for service in the Austrian Air Force but was rejected and joined the Army where he served with Infanterieregiment 3. Following the Anschluss, the annexation of Austria into Nazi Germany on 12 March 1938, Fellerer applied for service in the Luftwaffe and was again rejected. As a member of Infanterieregiment 131, an infantry regiment of the 44th Infantry Division, he participated in the annexation of Sudetenland.

In November 1938, following two further applications, he was accepted for flight training. (Note: Flight training in the Luftwaffe progressed through the levels A1, A2 and B1, B2, referred to as A/B flight training. A training included theoretical and practical training in aerobatics, navigation, long-distance flights and dead-stick landings. The B courses included high-altitude flights, instrument flights, night landings and training to handle the aircraft in difficult situations. For pilots destined to fly multi-engine aircraft, the training was completed with the Luftwaffe Advanced Pilot's Certificate (Erweiterter Luftwaffen-Flugzeugführerschein), also known as the C-Certificate.) He was selected to become a bomber pilot and completed his training at a Kampffliegerschule (Combat pilot school). In April 1940, Fellerer was promoted to Leutnant (second lieutenant) and posted to the Kampffliegerschule-Ergänzungsgruppe, a supplementary training unit for bomber pilots.

== World War II ==
A map of part of the Kammhuber Line. The 'belt' and night fighter 'boxes' are shown.

Following the 1939 aerial Battle of the Heligoland Bight, bombing missions by the Royal Air Force (RAF) shifted to the cover of darkness, initiating the Defence of the Reich campaign. By mid-1940, Generalmajor (Brigadier General) Josef Kammhuber had established a night air defense system dubbed the Kammhuber Line. It consisted of a series of control sectors equipped with radars and searchlights and an associated night fighter. Each sector, named a Himmelbett (canopy bed), would direct the night fighter into visual range with target bombers. In 1941, the Luftwaffe started equipping night fighters with airborne radar such as the Lichtenstein radar. This airborne radar did not come into general use until early 1942.

=== Night fighting ===
Fellerer was posted to II. Gruppe (2nd group) of Nachtjagdgeschwader 1 (NJG 1—1st Night Fighter Wing) as Technical Officer. He claimed his first victory on 11 February 1941, a Handley Page Hampden bomber X3001 of No. 49 Squadron north of Alkmaar. He was transferred to 4. Staffel of NJG 1 in June 1941. On 16 June, his Messerschmitt Bf 110 D-0 "G9+DM" was hit by the defensive gunfire from the RAF Vickers Wellington W5447 from No. 218 Squadron. The combat took place over the North Sea west of Den Helder. Fellerer and his radio operator Oberfeldwebel Heinz Hätscher returned to Bergen airfield.

On 10 October 1942, Fellerer was made Staffelkapitän (squadron leader) of 3. Staffel of NJG 1. Due to a redesignation, this squadron became the 5. Staffel of Nachtjagdgeschwader 5 (NJG 5—5th Night Fighter Wing) on 1 December 1942. Promoted to Hauptmann, Fellerer became Gruppenkommandeur (group commander) of II. Gruppe of NJG 5 in February 1944. During this period, Fellerer raised his score to 18 victories.

In January 1944, Fellerer claimed two United States Army Air Forces (USAAF) heavy bombers in daylight- a Consolidated B-24 Liberator on 4 January, and a Boeing B-17 Flying Fortress on 11 January. On the night of 20/21 January 1944 he claimed five Royal Air Force (RAF) bombers. He was then awarded the German Cross in Gold (Deutsches Kreuz in Gold) on 5 February 1944.

After 34 victories Hauptmann Fellerer was awarded the Knight's Cross of the Iron Cross (Ritterkreuz des Eisernen Kreuzes) on 8 April 1944. On 10 May 1944, II. Gruppe of NJG 5 became the III. Gruppe of Nachtjagdgeschwader 6 (NJG 6—6th Night Fighter Wing), which continued to lead.

During August–October 1944, Fellerer and III./NJG 6 also flew operations to counter supply operations from Italy to the Polish Home Army uprising in Warsaw. He claimed two Douglas DC-3s and two Liberators during this time, his final aerial victory coming in October 1944.

In 450 missions Leopold Fellerer claimed 41 aerial victories, 39 of them at night. 32 were four engine heavy bombers. (Note: For a list of Luftwaffe night fighter aces see List of German World War II night fighter aces.)

== Later life ==
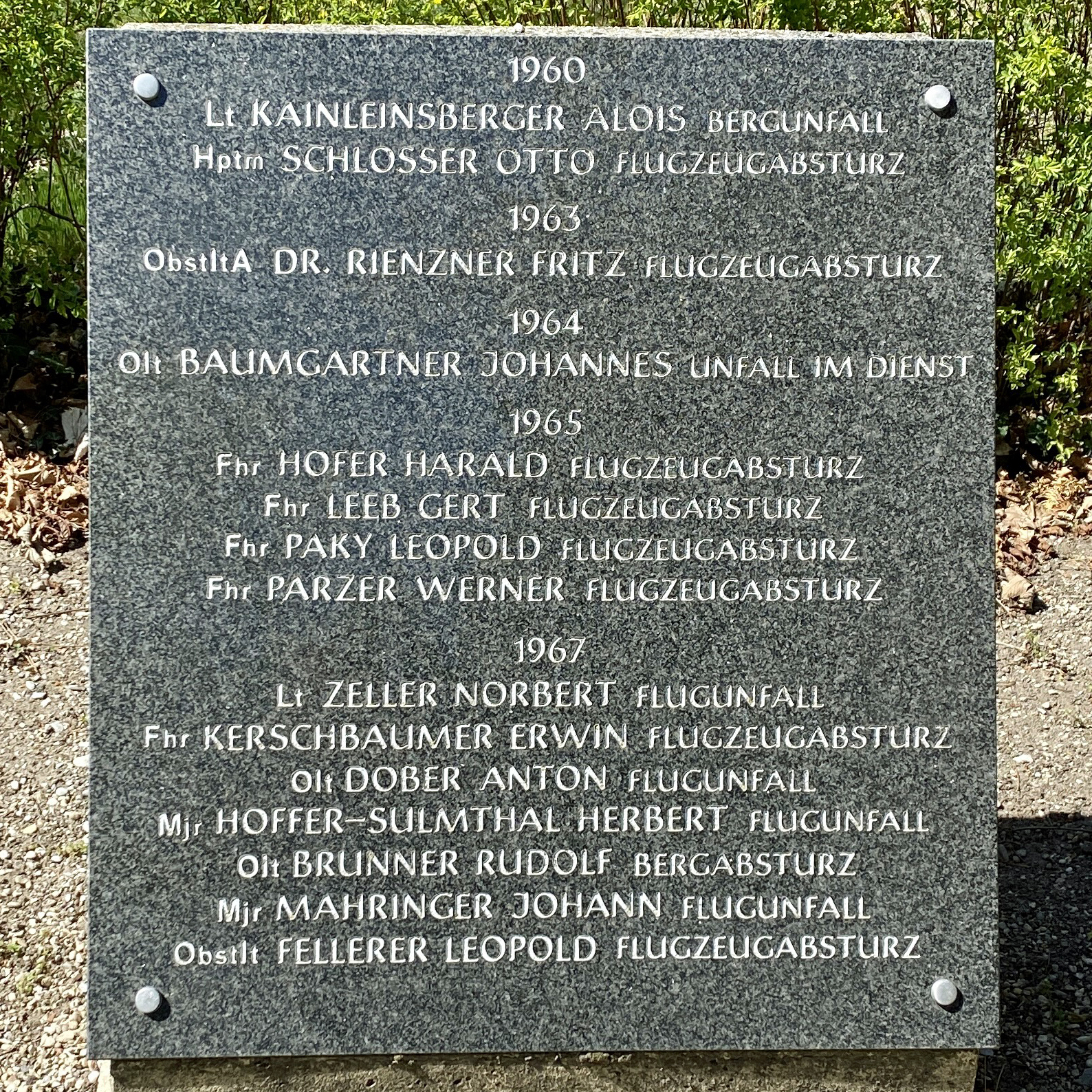
Plaque for officers of the Second Republic of Austria who died in the line of duty

During the 1950s, he served with the Austrian Air Force, becoming Commander of the Langenlebarn Airbase in Tulln on the Danube, retiring as an Oberstleutnant. Leopold Fellerer died on 15 July 1968 in an air crash, his Cessna L-19 coming down near Krems.

== Summary of career ==
=== Aerial victory claims ===
Foreman, Parry and Mathews, authors of Luftwaffe Night Fighter Claims 1939 – 1945, researched the German Federal Archives and found records for 40 nocturnal victory claims. Mathews and Foreman also published Luftwaffe Aces — Biographies and Victory Claims, listing Fellerer with 36 claims, including one four-engined bomber by day, plus four further unconfirmed claims.

Victory claims were logged to a map-reference (PQ = Planquadrat), for example "PQ 75884". The Luftwaffe grid map (Jägermeldenetz) covered all of Europe, western Russia and North Africa and was composed of rectangles measuring 15 minutes of latitude by 30 minutes of longitude, an area of about 360 square miles (930 km^{2}). These sectors were then subdivided into 36 smaller units to give a location area 3 km × 4 km (1.9 mi × 2.5 mi) in size.

Chronicle of aerial victories
This and the ♠ (Ace of spades) indicates those aerial victories which made Fellerer an "ace-in-a-day", a term which designates a fighter pilot who has shot down five or more airplanes in a single day. This and the ? (question mark) indicates information discrepancies listed in Luftwaffe Night Fighter Claims 1939 – 1945 and in Luftwaffe Aces — Biographies and Victory Claims.
Claim	Date	Time	Type	Location	Serial No./Squadron No.
– 5. Staffel of Nachtjagdgeschwader 1 –
1	11 February 1941	03:50	Hampden	10 km (6.2 mi) north of Alkmaar	
– 4. Staffel of Nachtjagdgeschwader 1 –
2	12 October 1941	22:17	Halifax	3 km (1.9 mi) south of Wons	
– 5. Staffel of Nachtjagdgeschwader 2 –
3	7 November 1941	22:35	Stirling	over sea, 8 km (5.0 mi) southwest of Bergen	
4	27 February 1942	21:38	Whitley	25 km (16 mi) north-northeast of Aurich	
5	29 March 1942	01:02	Stirling	PQ 75884, over sea	
6	8 May 1942	04:51	Hudson	1 km (0.62 mi) southwest of Den Helder	Hudson V8981/No. 320 (Netherlands) Squadron RAF
7	9 June 1942	02:15	Wellington	3 km (1.9 mi) northeast of Petten	
8	9 June 1942	02:19	Wellington	northwest of Callantsoog	
9	30 June 1942	03:02	Halifax	south of Hoorn	
10	29 August 1942	00:30	Stirling	Aichelbach	
11	9 September 1942	00:34	Wellington	Nackenheim	
12? (Note: According to Luftwaffe Aces — Biographies and Victory Claims, this claim was unconfirmed while Luftwaffe Night Fighter Claims 1939 – 1945 confirm this claim.)	9 December 1942	21:52	Whitley		
13	3 October 1943	22:57	Lancaster	40 km (25 mi) south of Kassel	
14	22 October 1943	21:07	Lancaster	15 km (9.3 mi) north of Kassel	
15?	26 November 1943	—	Lancaster		
16?	26 November 1943	—	Lancaster		
17?	2 December 1943	—	Lancaster		
18	2 December 1943	19:36	Lancaster	Wesendorf	
19	2 December 1943	20:15	Lancaster	Berlin	
– Stab II. Gruppe of Nachtjagdgeschwader 5 –
20	6 January 1944	03:27	B-24		
21	11 January 1944	13:00	B-17	Quakenbrück-Meppen	
22	14 January 1944	19:20	Lancaster		
23	14 January 1944	19:45	Lancaster		
24♠	20 January 1944	19:40	Halifax		Halifax LW337
25♠	20 January 1944	19:50	Halifax		
26♠	20 January 1944	19:58	Halifax		
27♠	20 January 1944	20:05	Halifax		
28♠	20 January 1944	20:11	Lancaster		
29	29 January 1944	03:01	Halifax		
30	29 January 1944	03:15	Halifax		
31	15 February 1944	20:46	Halifax	Lake Schwerin	
32	28 April 1944	01:30	Halifax	Mulhouse	
33	28 April 1944	02:20	Halifax	Borensen	
– Stab III. Gruppe of Nachtjagdgeschwader 6 –
34	4 July 1944	01:50	Halifax	15 km (9.3 mi) northeast of Kaposvár	
35	7 July 1944	01:45	Lancaster	east of Marburg	
36	7 July 1944	02:05	Wellington	north of Laibach	
37	21 July 1944	23:42	Boston	west of Brod	
38	20 August 1944	23:50	B-24	north of Laibach	
39	19 September 1944	20:26	DC-3		
40	20 October 1944	22:21	B-24	Szombathely	

=== Awards ===
- Aviator badge
- Front Flying Clasp of the Luftwaffe in Gold
- Iron Cross (1939) 2nd and 1st Class
- Honour Goblet of the Luftwaffe (Ehrenpokal der Luftwaffe) on 16 November 1942 as Oberleutnant and pilot
- German Cross in Gold on 5 February 1944 as Hauptmann in the 5./Nachtjagdgeschwader 5
- Knight's Cross of the Iron Cross on 8 April 1944 as Hauptmann and Gruppenkommandeur of the II./Nachtjagdgeschwader 5

== Notes ==
Military offices
Preceded by Hauptmann Baer	Gruppenkommandeur of II. Nachtjagdgeschwader 5 February 1944 - 10 May 1944	Succeeded by Major Hans Leickhardt
Preceded by None	Gruppenkommandeur of III. Nachtjagdgeschwader 6; 10 May 1944 - February 1945	Succeeded by Hauptmann Wilhelm Johnen
