= Werner Hoffmann (nightfighter pilot) =

German fighter ace and Knight's Cross recipient

- Born: 13 January 1918; Stettin, German Empire
- Died: 8 July 2011 (aged 93); Bremen, Germany
- Military career
- Allegiance: Nazi Germany
- Branch: Luftwaffe
- Service years: 1936–45
- Rank: Major (major)
- Units: ZG 2 NJG 3 NJG 1 NJG 5
- Commands: I./Nachtjagdgeschwader 5
- Conflicts: World War II: Battle of France; Defence of the Reich
- Awards: Knight's Cross of the Iron Cross

Werner Hoffmann (13 January 1918 – 8 July 2011) was a German Luftwaffe night fighter ace and recipient of the Knight's Cross of the Iron Cross, the highest award in the military and paramilitary forces of Nazi Germany during World War II. Hoffmann was credited 51 aerial victories, 50 of them at night, claimed in 192 combat missions. (Note: For a list of Luftwaffe night fighter aces see List of German World War II night fighter aces.)

== Early life and career ==
Hoffmann was born on 13 January 1918 in Stettin, present-day Szczecin in the West Pomeranian Voivodeship in Poland, at the time in the Province of Pomerania of the German Empire. He was the only child of Walter, a ship building engineer, and Gertrud Hoffmann. In 1924, Hoffmann began his schooling at the Volksschule, a primary school, in Stettin. A year later, the family moved to Berlin, settling in Wilmersdorf. There, in 1928, he attended a Gymnasium, a secondary school.

Hoffmann began flying gliders in 1932 and joined the Luftwaffe in December 1936, learning to fly with the Luftkriegsschule 3 (LKS 3—3rd air war school), Wildpark-West near Werder. He was awarded his pilot's badge in June 1938 and was then posted to 7. Staffel of Jagdgeschwader 234 (JG 234—234th Fighter Wing), a squadron of III. Gruppe. III. Gruppe of JG 234 was eventually redesignated I. Gruppe of Zerstörergeschwader 52 (ZG 2—52nd Destroyer Wing) in May 1939 and was equipped with the new Messerschmitt Bf 110 heavy fighter.

== World War II ==
World War II in Europe began on Friday 1 September 1939 when German forces invaded Poland. Hoffmann was assigned to 4. Staffel of Zerstörergeschwader 2 (ZG 2—2nd Destroyer Wing) in early 1940 and participated in the Battle of France. He claimed his aerial first aerial victory, a Royal Air Force (RAF) Hawker Hurricane fighter over Dunkirk, on 24 May 1940. That day, he also shot down Flying Officer Peter Cazenove in his Supermarine Spitfire from No. 92 Squadron. On 19 June, he hit by ground fire during a ground attack mission on French troops but returned to his airfield. Hoffmann sustained injuries in his left elbow, requiring weeks of convalescence.

In July 1940, Hoffmann was transferred to Ergänzungs-Zerstörergruppe Værløse as an instructor with the rank of Oberleutnant and appointed Staffelkapitän (squadron leader). He remained with the unit until 3 August 1941, when the unit was disbanded. He then underwent conversion training as a night fighter pilot.

=== Night fighter career ===
A map of part of the Kammhuber Line. The 'belt' and night fighter 'boxes' are shown.

Following the 1939 aerial Battle of the Heligoland Bight, RAF attacks shifted to the cover of darkness, initiating the Defence of the Reich campaign. By mid-1940, Generalmajor (Brigadier General) Josef Kammhuber had established a night air defense system dubbed the Kammhuber Line. It consisted of a series of control sectors equipped with radars and searchlights and an associated night fighter. Each sector named a Himmelbett (canopy bed) would direct the night fighter into visual range with target bombers. In 1941, the Luftwaffe started equipping night fighters with airborne radar such as the Lichtenstein radar. This airborne radar did not come into general use until early 1942.

Hoffmann was posted as Staffelkapitän to 5. Staffel of Nachtjagdgeschwader 3 (NJG 3—3rd Night Fighter Wing) based at Schleswig. On the night of 25/26 June 1942, Hoffmann shot down two twin-engine bombers during the 1,000-bomber raid on Bremen. Hoffmann was appointed Staffelkapitän of 4. Staffel of Nachtjagdgeschwader 5 (NJG 5—5th Night Fighter Wing) on 11 February 1943.

=== Group commander ===
Hoffmann then served with I./NJG 1, based at Sint-Truiden, Saint-Trond in French pronunciation. On 4 July 1943, he was appointed Gruppenkommandeur (group commander) of I. Gruppe of NJG 5, succeeding Hauptmann Siegfried Wandam in this capacity.

On 15 November, Hoffmann was awarded the German Cross in Gold (Deutsches Kreuz in Gold) for 15 victories and by the end of 1943 had a victory total of 18. On 20 January 1944 Hoffmann had to bail out over Berlin when his aircraft was damaged by return fire from an RAF Lancaster. On the night of 28/29 January he shot down three Halifax bombers raiding Berlin and claimed two Lancaster bombers shot down the next night.

Hoffmann was awarded the Knight's Cross of the Iron Cross (Ritterkreuz des Eisernen Kreuzes) for 31 victories on 4 May 1944. On 29 June, Hoffmann shot down a four-engine bomber but again bailed out when his aircraft received hits from defensive fire from the bomber. On the night of 7/8 July he shot down three RAF bombers. In late July 1944 I./NJG 5 was withdrawn to Stendal for re-equipment with the Ju 88 G-6. Deployed to East Prussia, Hoffmann claimed four victories over Soviet-flown aircraft around Libau during December 1944.

By early 1945 Hoffmann had 44 victories. Following the Soviet offensive on 12 January 1945, Major Hoffmann flew ground-attack operations against ground forces. Hoffmann claimed a further seven victories during 1945. On the night of 16/17 March 1945, Hoffmann claimed three aerial victories but was himself shot down. His first claim, a Lancaster bomber, was shot down southwest of Schwäbisch-Hall, a Halifax bomber was destroyed near Ansbach, and a Lancaster bomber was claimed east of Ansbach. Near Nuremberg, his Ju 88 G-6 came under attack from a No. 239 Squadron De Havilland Mosquito night-fighter flown by Squadron Leader Dennis Hughes and Flight Lieutenant 'Dickie' Percks. His entire crew bailed out with Hoffmann suffered severe bruising to his chest.

On 1 May 1945, Hoffmann joined 7./NJG 3, based at Husum. Hoffmann was recommended for the Knight's Cross of the Iron Cross with Oak Leaves (Ritterkreuz des Eisernen Kreuzes mit Eichenlaub), a presentation was never made.

== Later life ==
Following three months internment in the POW camp at Wiedelah, Hoffmann was released. After the war he studied pharmacy and opened a dispensary in Goslar. In 1957, Hoffmann was engaged by Hoechst AG in Bremen in an advisory role.

=== Aerial victory claims ===
Hoffmann was credited with 52 aerial victories, 51 of which by night, claimed in 192 combat missions. He filed four nocturnal aerial victories on the Eastern Front. Foreman, Parry and Mathews, authors of Luftwaffe Night Fighter Claims 1939 – 1945, researched the German Federal Archives and found records for 51 nocturnal victory claims. Mathews and Foreman also published Luftwaffe Aces — Biographies and Victory Claims, listing Hoffmann with 51 claims, including one as a Zerstörer pilot by day, plus one further unconfirmed claim, also by day.

In some instances, aerial victories were claimed and logged in a Planquadrat (PQ—grid reference). The Luftwaffe grid map (Jägermeldenetz) map was composed of rectangles measuring 15 minutes of latitude by 30 minutes of longitude, an area of about 360 square miles (930 km^{2}).

Chronicle of aerial victories
This and the – (dash) indicates unwitnessed aerial victory claims for which Hoffmann did not receive credit. This and the ? (question mark) indicates information discrepancies listed in Luftwaffe Night Fighter Claims 1939 – 1945 but not in Luftwaffe Aces — Biographies and Victory Claims.
Claim (total)	Claim (nocturnal)	Date	Time	Type	Location	Serial No./Squadron No.
– 1. Staffel of Zerstörergeschwader 52 –
—		24 May 1940	—	Hurricane	Dunkirk	
1		24 May 1940	20:30	Spitfire	Dunkirk	
– 5. Staffel of Nachtjagdgeschwader 3 –
2	1	26 June 1942	02:26	Hudson	6 km (3.7 mi) southeast of Heide	
3	2	26 June 1942	03:24	Whitley	6 km (3.7 mi) north of Busum	
– 4. Staffel of Nachtjagdgeschwader 5 –
4	3	21 April 1943	00:45	Halifax	1.5 km (0.93 mi) east of Eggesin	Halifax JB912/No. 419 Bomber Squadron RCAF
5	4	21 April 1943	00:50	Halifax	500 m (550 yd) south of Gut-Borkum	Halifax JB804/No. 77 Squadron RAF
6? (Note: This claim is listed in Luftwaffe Aces — Biographies and Victory Claims but not in Luftwaffe Night Fighter Claims 1939 – 1945.)		30 May 1943	01:45	Halifax		
—	5	25 June 1943	01:21	Lancaster	3 km (1.9 mi) southwest of Erkelenz	
7	6	25 June 1943	01:24? (Note: According to Luftwaffe Aces — Biographies and Victory Claims at 01:54.)	Lancaster	PQ 6278 vicinity of Erkelenz	Lancaster ED858/No. 156 Squadron RAF
8	7	25 June 1943	01:54	Wellington	1 km (0.62 mi) south of Brasel	Wellington HF594/No. 166 Squadron RAF
9	8	29 June 1943	02:18	Stirling	3 km (1.9 mi) northwest of Lommel vicinity of Leopoldsburg	Stirling BK694/No. 15 Squadron RAF
– Stab I. Gruppe of Nachtjagdgeschwader 5 –
10	9	4 September 1943	00:32	Lancaster	center of Berlin	
11	10	7 September 1943	00:24	four-engined bomber	east of Munich	
12	11	7 September 1943	00:45	Lancaster	south of Munich	Halifax HR943/No. 158 Squadron RAF
13	12	27 September 1943	23:18	Lancaster	Hanover	Lancaster JA704/No. 166 Squadron RAF
14	13	18 October 1943	20:25	Halifax	5–10 km (3.1–6.2 mi) northeast of Hanover	Lancaster ED499/No. 9 Squadron RAF
15	14	22 October 1943	21:14	Lancaster	35 km (22 mi) north of Kassel	
16	15	22 October 1943	21:32	Lancaster	Bückeburg	
17	16	23 November 1943	20:08	Lancaster	southwest of Berlin	Lancaster JB223/No. 156 Squadron RAF
18	17	2 December 1943	20:23	Lancaster	Berlin	
19	18	2 December 1943	20:34	Lancaster	Berlin	
20	19	2 January 1944	03:06	Lancaster	Berlin	Lancaster JB703/No. 156 Squadron RAF (Note: According to the Aviation Safety Network, potentially claimed by Hauptmann Walter Borchers.)
21	20	20 January 1944	19:20	Lancaster	20 km (12 mi) north-northeast of Rathenow	
22	21	29 January 1944	03:12	Halifax	5 km (3.1 mi) north of Neuruppin	
23	22	29 January 1944	03:27	Halifax	25 km (16 mi) northeast of Berlin	
24	23	29 January 1944	03:55	Halifax	25 km (16 mi) northeast of Berlin	
25	24	30 January 1944	20:15	Lancaster	center of Berlin	
26	25	30 January 1944	20:35	Lancaster	center of Berlin	
27	26	15 February 1944	20:48	Halifax	40 km (25 mi) northwest of Rostock	
28	27	20 February 1944	02:51	Lancaster	25 km (16 mi) east of Braunschweig	
29	28	20 February 1944	03:17	Halifax	vicinity of Stendal	Halifax LV816/No. 78 Squadron RAF
30	29	4 May 1944	00:36	Lancaster	15–20 km (9.3–12.4 mi) south of Mailly-le-Camp	Lancaster LL743/No. 166 Squadron RAF
31	30	4 May 1944	00:36	Lancaster	15–20 km (9.3–12.4 mi) south of Mailly-le-Camp	
32	31	3 June 1944	01:24	four-engined bomber	south of Elbeuf	
33	32	28 June 1944	03:50	Halifax	northwest of Reims	
34	33	29 June 1944	00:58	Halifax	northwest of Reims	Lancaster PA980/No. 405 Squadron RCAF
35	34	8 July 1944	01:31	Lancaster	south of Gisors	
36	35	8 July 1944	01:40	Lancaster	3 km (1.9 mi) north of Foucarmont	
37	36	8 July 1944	01:50	Lancaster	southeast of Dieppe	
38	37	13 July 1944	02:12	Lancaster	10 km (6.2 mi) west of Neufchâteau	
39	38	13 July 1944	02:18	Lancaster	10 km (6.2 mi) southeast of Joinville	
40	39	15 July 1944	02:10	Lancaster	5 km (3.1 mi) east of Thonnance	
41		30 August 1944	01:37	Lancaster	25 km (16 mi) northwest of Königsberg	
42	41	14 December 1944	16:54	DB-3	vicinity of Libau	
43	42	20 December 1944	17:19	PS-84	east of Libau	
44	43	20 December 1944	18:09	DB-3	east of Libau	
45	44	20 December 1944	18:28	DB-3	east of Libau	
46	45	6 January 1945	21:12	Halifax	Gdańsk Bay	Halifax PB637/No. 103 Squadron RAF
47	46	14 February 1945	21:58	B-17	southwest of Bad Kissingen	
48	47	14 February 1945	22:11	Lancaster	southwest of Bad Kissingen	
49	48	16 March 1945	21:18	Lancaster	southwest of Schwäbisch Hall	
50	49	16 March 1945	21:26	Lancaster	Ansbach	
51	50	16 March 1945	21:30	Lancaster	east of Ansbach	
	51	8 April 1945	23:00	Lancaster	Weissenfels	

=== Awards ===
- Aviator badge (2 June 1938)
- Iron Cross (1939)
  - 2nd Class (15 June 1940)
  - 1st Class (10 July 1940)
- Front Flying Clasp of the Luftwaffe for Night Fighter Pilots
  - in Bronze on 21 May 1941
  - in Silver on 16 February 1942
  - in Gold on 8 July 1943
- German Cross in Gold on 15 November 1943 with I./Nachtjagdgeschwader 5
- Honour Goblet of the Luftwaffe (Ehrenpokal der Luftwaffe) on 28 February 1944 as Hauptmann and pilot
- Knight's Cross of the Iron Cross on 4 May 1944 as Hauptmann and Gruppenkommandeur of the I./Nachtjagdgeschwader 5
