= Seeburg plotting table =

The Seeburg plotting table (German: Seeburg-Tisch) was a mechanical plotting table used by Nazi Germany in their operation rooms to track aircraft and coordinate operations during World War II. It was produced by Siemens.

Attached to the plotting table was a Freya radar and two Würzburg-Riese radars. Freya radars would pick up and track the bombing raids and an attached Würzburg radar would then select an individual bomber and track it. The other Würzburg would track the night fighter that was sent out to find and attack the bombers.

This plotting was done on a large, translucent glass plate. The radar position of both enemy bombers and the friendly night fighters were displayed on the table as moving spots of light. The enemy was displayed with a red spot and a blue spot represented the night fighter.

The table had a grid that corresponded to the Kammhuber Line system (or Himmelbett as it was known in Germany) over the sector that was covered by its radar. The grid was a series of control sectors, that had associated radars, searchlights, and a night fighter. Each grid square was further subdivided into smaller squares, numbered 1 to 9. This smaller grid represented an airspace of roughly 9 x 11 km, a size that allowed the night fighter to find the bombers with its own Lichtenstein airborne intercept radar.

As the dots moved over time, the track was marked manually on the table by six female auxiliaries that were seated by it, known as Luftwaffe Hilferin or by the Luftwaffe slang term 'Blitzmädel', or lightning maidens. A Luftwaffe officer would oversee the development and acted as a fighter controller, directing the night fighter to the closest grid via radio. Operations were previously manually coordinated using an Auswertetisch, which was a precursor to the Seeburg.

== See also ==
- Dowding system
- Kammhuber Line
