= Nachtjagdgeschwader 100 =

- Active: 1943 – 1945
- Country: Nazi Germany
- Branch: Luftwaffe
- Type: Night Fighter
- Role: Air superiority
- Size: Air Force Wing
- Engagements: World War II

Insignia
- Identification symbol: Geschwaderkennung of 8V (4.Staffel)

Nachtjagdgeschwader 100 (NJG 100) was a Luftwaffe night fighter-wing of World War II. The Geschwader did not have a Stab and no Geschwaderkommodore. It had two Gruppen (groups), operating separately. The I. Gruppe of NJG 100 was formed in early 1943 from the II.(Eis)/Nachtjagdgeschwader 5 while II. Gruppe was formed in July 1944 from three Staffeln of Nachtjagdgeschwader 200.

== Commanding officers ==
Gruppenkommandeure

=== I. Gruppe of NJG 100 ===
- Major Heinrich Prinz zu Sayn-Wittgenstein, 1 August 1943 – 5 August 1943
- Major Rudolf Schoenert, 5 August 1943 – 31 December 1943

=== II. Gruppe of NJG 100 ===
- Major Paul Zorner, 20 July 1944 – 8 May 1945
