= Nachtjagdgeschwader 5 =

- Active: 1942–1945
- Country: Nazi Germany
- Branch: Luftwaffe
- Type: Night Fighter
- Role: Air superiority
- Size: Air Force Wing
- Engagements: World War II

Insignia
- Identification symbol: Geschwaderkennung of C9, 1B, 3C, 4R

Nachtjagdgeschwader 5 (NJG 5) was a Luftwaffe night fighter-wing of World War II. NJG 5 was formed on 30 September 1942 in Döberitz.

== Operational history ==
On 1 October 1942, 3./NJG 1 was redesignated 1./NJG 5. In March and April 1943, General Josef Kammhuber ordered IV./NJG 5 to Rennes, France to protect the German U-boat bases. The group was relocated to the Eastern Front again and redesignated as I./Nachtjagdgeschwader 100 (I./NJG 100).

=== Eastern Front ===
By early 1943 the Soviet Air Forces were increasing difficulties for the invading German forces. At night harassment sorties were flown with elderly biplanes. The Polikarpov Po-2, known to the Germans as the Nähmaschine (sewing machine), did little damage in night raids but had an immense nuisance value. The aircraft with their slow cruising speed made interception extremely difficult.

To counter these attacks IV./NJG 5 under Heinrich Prinz zu Sayn-Wittgenstein was moved to the Eastern Front in February 1943. The unit moved to Bryansk and Orel in June 1943 for Operation Citadel and later operated under Luftflotte 6 in the Smolensk-Bryansk area and under Luftflotte 4 in the Poltava-Stalino area.

=== Western Front ===
Oberleutnant Walter Borchers was made Gruppenkommandeur of III./NJG 5 on 22 April 1943, leading the Gruppe until March 1944. On the night of 27/28 April, Wilhelm Johnen in a Messerschmitt Bf 110 G-4 performed an emergency landing at the Swiss airfield at Zürich-Dubendorf. Johnen and his crew were interned, and the Luftwaffe employed extensive political manoeuvring to ensure the Bf 110, equipped with the still secret SN-2 radar, was kept from close Allied examination and returned intact.

At the end of July 1944 I./NJG 5 was withdrawn to Stendal for re-equipment with the new Ju 88G-6 night fighter. Then deployed to Jesau near Königsberg in East Prussia, present day Yushny, Bagrationovsky District, night operations against Soviet bombers followed for the remainder of 1944. Following the opening of the Soviet offensive on 12 January 1945, I./NJG 5 operated in the ground attack role on the eastern front. By 25 January 1945 I./NJG 5 was again operating from bases in Germany, relocating to Parchim and Erfurt.

Borchers was shot down and killed on the night of 5 March 1945 by W/C Walter Gibb and F/O Kendall in a Mosquito night fighter of No. 239 Squadron. Flying Junkers Ju 88 G-6 "C9+GA" (Werknummer 622 319—factory number) his air gunner parachuted to safety while his radio operator was also killed. he was replaced by Major Rudolf Schoenert. By the war's end the bulk of NJG 5 were based at Lübeck-Blankensee.

== Commanding officers ==
=== Kommodore ===
- Major Fritz Schaffer, 30 September 1942 – 1 August 1943
- Oberst Günther Radusch, 2 August 1943 – 3 February 1944
- Major Egmont Prinz zur Lippe-Weißenfeld, 20 February 1944 – 12 March 1944
- Oberstleutnant Walter Borchers, 15 March 1944 – 5 March 1945
- Major Rudolf Schoenert, 6 March 1945 – 8 May 1945

=== Gruppenkommandeure ===
==== I. Gruppe/NJG 5 ====
- Hauptmann Siegfried Wandam, late September 1942 – 4 July 1943
- Major Werner Hoffmann, 4 July 1943 – late April 1945
- Hauptmann Lang, April 1945 – 8 May 1945

==== II. Gruppe/NJG 5 ====
- Hauptmann Rudolf Schoenert, 1 December 1942 – 5 August 1943
- Hauptmann Manfred Meurer, 5 August 1943 – 27 September 1943
- Hauptmann Baer, 28 September 1943 – 27 January 1944
- Hauptmann Leopold Fellerer, February 1944 – 10 May 1944
- Major Hans Leickhardt, 3 May 1944 – 6 March 1945
- Hauptmann Gustav Tham, 10 March 1945 – 4 April 1945
- Oberstleutnant Werner Rapp, 5 April 1945 – 8 May 1945

==== III. Gruppe/NJG 5 ====
- Hauptmann Walter Borchers, April 1943 – 15 March 1944
- Major Paul Zorner, 16 March 1944 – 21 October 1944
- Hauptmann Ulrich von Meien, 22 October 1944 – 6 February 1945
- Hauptmann Walter Engel, 6 February 1945 – April 1945
- Hauptmann Piuk, April 1945 – 8 May 1945
