= Nachtjagdgeschwader 6 =

- Active: 1943 – 1945
- Country: Nazi Germany
- Branch: Luftwaffe
- Type: Night Fighter
- Role: Air superiority
- Size: Air Force Wing
- Engagements: World War II

Insignia
- Identification symbol: 2Z

Nachtjagdgeschwader 6 (NJG 6) was a Luftwaffe night fighter-wing of World War II. NJG 6 was formed in May 1943.

== Commanding officers ==
- Major Fritz Schaffer, 10 August 1943 – 8 February 1944
- Major Heinrich Wohlers, 9 February 1944 – 15 March 1944
- Major Heinz von Reeken, 16 March 1944 – 14 April 1944
- Major Heinrich Griese, 15 April 1944 – 12 September 1944
- Oberstleutnant Herbert Lütje, 13 September 1944 – 8 May 1945
