= Nachtjagdgeschwader 4 =

- Active: 1941 – 1945
- Country: Nazi Germany
- Branch: Luftwaffe
- Type: Night Fighter
- Role: Air superiority
- Size: Air Force Wing
- Engagements: World War II

Insignia
- Identification symbol: 3C; 3U (I./NJG 4, from ZG 26)

Nachtjagdgeschwader 4 (NJG 4) was a Luftwaffe night fighter-wing of World War II. NJG 4 was formed on 18 April 1941 in Metz. The unit's objective was to counter RAF Bomber Command's strategic night-bombing offensive. The unit's commanding officers included Oberstleutnant Wolfgang Thimmig (October 1943 – November 1944) and Major Heinz-Wolfgang Schnaufer (20 November 1944 – 8 May 1945).

== Commanding officers ==
=== Geschwaderkommodore ===
- Major Rudolf Stoltenhoff, 18 April 1941 – 20 October 1943
- Oberstleutnant Wolfgang Thimmig, 20 October 1943 – 14 November 1944
- Major Heinz-Wolfgang Schnaufer, 14 November 1944 – 8 May 1945

=== Gruppenkommandeur ===
==== I. Gruppe ====
- Major Wilhelm Herget, 1 September 1942 – December 1944
- Hauptmann Johannes Krause, December 1944 – 8 May 1945

==== II. Gruppe ====
- Hauptmann Theodor Rossiwall, 1 October 1942 – 13 January 1943

==== III. Gruppe ====
- Hauptmann Hans-Karl Kamp, 23 June 1943 – 6 December 1944
- Hauptmann Ludwig Meister, 6 December 1944 – 8 May 1945
