= Kammhuber Line =

German night air defense system

A map of part of the Kammhuber Line stolen by a Belgian agent and passed-on to the British in 1942. The 'belt' and nightfighter 'boxes' are shown

The Kammhuber Line was the name given by the Allies to the German night-fighter air-defence system established in western Europe in July 1940 by Colonel Josef Kammhuber. It consisted of a series of control sectors equipped with radars and searchlights and an associated night fighter. Each sector would direct the night fighter into visual range to target intruding bombers.

The Line proved very effective against initial RAF Bomber Command tactics. However, the RAF analyzed the German system and developed a counter-measure. On the night of 30/31 May 1942 in its 1,000 plane raid against Cologne, Bomber Command introduced the use of the bomber stream. The concentration of bombers through a few of the boxes overwhelmed the Luftwaffe defenses. In response, the Germans converted their ground radar into a radar network which would follow the path of the British bombers, while a controller directed the night fighters into the stream. Measure and counter-measure continued until October 1944, when German defenses were no longer able to respond.

== Description ==
The first version of the Line consisted of a series of radar stations with overlapping coverage, layered three deep from Denmark to the middle of France, each covering a zone about 32 kilometres (20 mi) long (north-south) and 20 kilometres (12 mi) wide (east-west). Each control centre was known as a Himmelbett (canopy bed) zone, consisting of a Freya radar with a range of about 100 kilometres (62 mi), a "master searchlight" directed by the radar, and a number of manually directed searchlights spread through the cell. Each cell was also assigned one primary and one backup night fighter. The fighter used was usually a Dornier Do 17Z-10, Junkers Ju 88C or Messerschmitt Bf 110. This technique of ground-controlled interception (GCI) was preceded by the use of single-engined non radar-equipped Bf 109s guided to the attacking bombers by the illumination of searchlights, termed; Helle Nachtjagd – illuminated night fighting.

RAF bombers flying into Germany or France had to cross the line at some point, at which time the Freya radar operators directed the master searchlight to illuminate the plane. Once this had happened other manually controlled searchlights also picked up the plane, and the night fighters were directed to intercept the illuminated bomber. Demands by the Bürgermeisters in Germany led to the recall of the searchlights to the major cities, which undermined this system.

Later versions of the Himmelbett added two Würzburg radars, with a range of about 30 kilometres (19 mi). Unlike the early-warning Freya, Würzburgs were accurate (and complex) tracking radars. One was locked onto the night fighter as soon as it entered the cell and as soon as the Freya picked up a target the second Würzburg locked onto it. All position reports were sent to the Himmelbett control centre thereby allowing controllers in the Himmelbett centre to get continual readings of the positions of both planes.

A Jägerleitoffizier directed the German night-fighter to a visual interception with the RAF bomber using radio. Operations were manually coordinated using an "Auswertetisch" (the precursor of a "Seeburg" plotting table). To aid interception a number of the night fighters were fitted with a short-range infrared device known as the Spanner-Anlage but these proved almost useless. Later the short-range, UHF-band original version of the Lichtenstein airborne intercept radar system was added to the aircraft, allowing them to detect aircraft once the operators had directed them into the area, making searchlights largely redundant. The battle stations were known as "Kammhuber's opera houses" and procedures developed in 1942 were used until the end of the war.

== Counter-measures ==
British intelligence soon discovered the nature of the Kammhuber Line and started studying ways to defeat it. At the time RAF Bomber Command exerted no discipline on how pilots were to get their aircraft to the target. There was an air of amateurism and individuality to the pilots of Bomber Command. Each pilot was on his own as to his flight path to the target, altitude to be flown and time of arrival. Thus bombing attacks would go on sporadically for four or five hours, and there was no concentration in the bombing. The boxes of the Kammhuber Line were well set up to deal with the broad approach paths of individual bombers.

At the urging of R. V. Jones, Bomber Command reorganized their attacks into streams of bombers – the so-called bomber stream, carefully positioned so the stream flew down the middle of a single cell. Data provided to the British scientists allowed them to calculate that the bomber stream would overwhelm the six potential interceptions per hour that the German night fighters could manage in a Himmelbett zone. It was then a matter of calculating the statistical loss from collisions against the statistical loss from night fighters to calculate how close the bombers should fly to minimise RAF losses. The introduction of Gee radio navigation in 1942 allowed the RAF bombers to fly by a common route and at the same speed to and from the target, each aircraft being allotted a height band and a time slot in a bomber stream to minimize the risk of collision. The first use of the bomber stream was the first 1,000 bomber raid against Cologne on the night of 30/31 May 1942. This tactic was extremely effective, leading to fighting between Kammhuber and Erhard Milch, his boss.

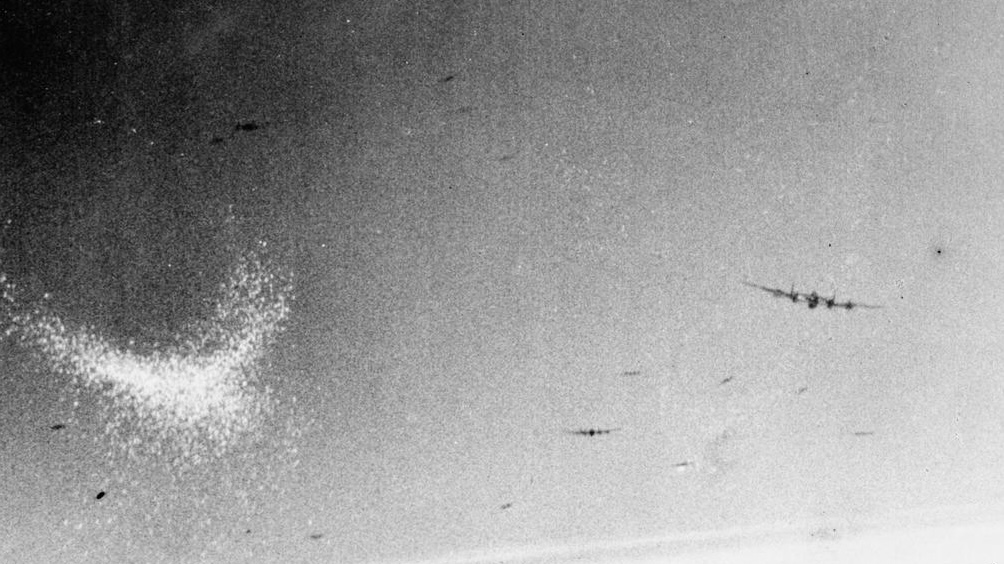
A Lancaster within the bomber stream dropping window – the crescent-shaped white cloud on the left of the picture

Although the success rate of the line dropped, the network of radars and plotting stations continued to prove their worth. Now when a raid started, night fighters from any base within range were directed into the stream, where it was hoped they would be able to find aircraft with their radar. At the same time a massive building program started to add hundreds of Würzburgs to the system, although the infrastructure needed was extensive. The boxes were initially the radius of the Würzburg radars, about 22 miles (35 km), but more powerful radar later on made the boxes up to 100 miles (160 km) across. Eventually, the line of boxes was several deep, especially around larger towns and the Ruhr valley. Once again the system started to score increasing successes against the British raids.

The British were ready for this development, and as soon as the rates started to improve – for the Germans – they introduced "Window". When they dropped strips of foil from "lead" bombers, the German radar operators saw what appeared to be a stream entering their box, each packet of chaff appearing to be a bomber on their displays. Night fighters were then sent to attack this stream, only to find empty space. Just as the fighters reached the false stream, the "real" stream appeared hundreds of miles away, too far to be attacked. The first time this was used was during Operation Gomorrah (a week-long bombing campaign against Hamburg) and proved spectacularly effective. The German radar operators eventually learned to spot the lead bombers at the edge of the windowing, making it less effective. The British had held back from introducing Window for over a year lest the technique be adopted by the Germans and used against British cities.

A more sophisticated method for blinding the German radar was "Mandrel", a jamming signal broadcast from aircraft accompanying the bomber stream or later certain bombers themselves. This progressed into jamming techniques against individual German radar types and spoofing radars to see bomber streams that were not there. The British also attacked the communications between ground stations and fighters, with Operation Corona, broadcasting false directions in authentic accents over the radio.

One other element was long-range nightfighters operating against the German nightfighters, using a system called "Serrate" to home in on the German nightfighter radar signals. At least three squadrons equipped with Bristol Beaufighter and de Havilland Mosquito were part of No. 100 Group RAF supporting Bomber Command with electronic countermeasures.

== See also ==
- Battle of the Beams
- Flak tower
- List of World War II electronic warfare equipment

== Bibliography ==
- Bowman, Martin (2016). Nachtjagd, Defenders of the Reich 1940–1943. Barnsley, South Yorkshire: Pen and Sword Books. ISBN 978-1-4738-4986-0.
- Middlebrook, Martin (1974). 30–31 March 1944. New York, NY: William Morrow & Company. ISBN 978-0-688-02873-2.
