= List of World War II aces from Germany: Q–S =

This is a list of fighter aces in World War II from Germany with their surname starting from Q to S. A flying ace or fighter ace is a military aviator credited with shooting down five or more enemy aircraft during aerial combat. Aces are listed alphabetically by last name.

== Aces ==
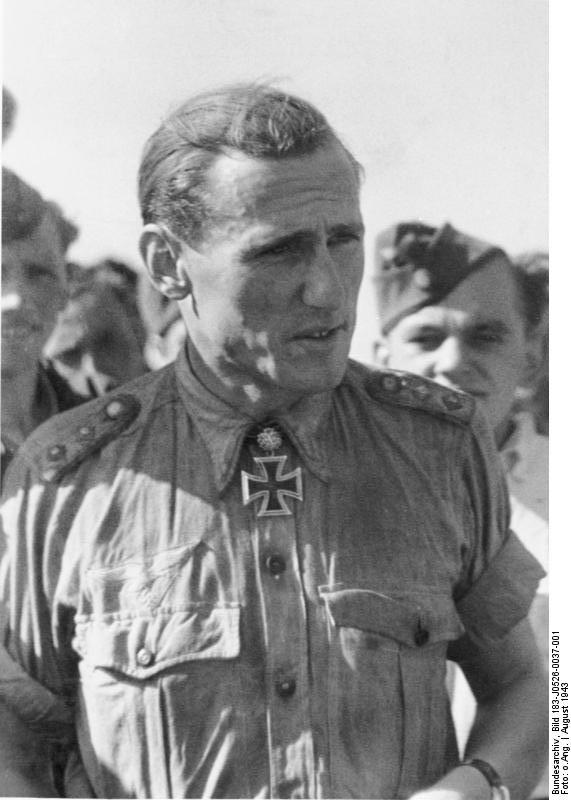
Günther Rall, third most successful fighter pilot in aviation history.

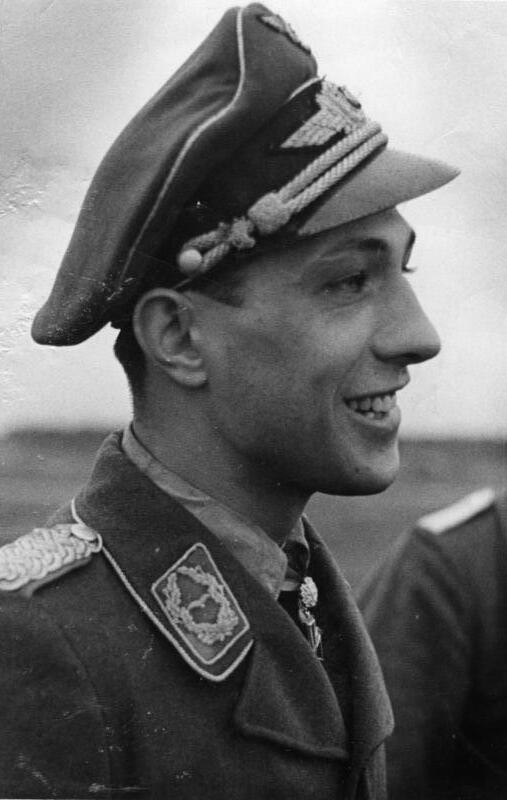
Erich Rudorffer, claimed thirteen aerial victories on a single mission

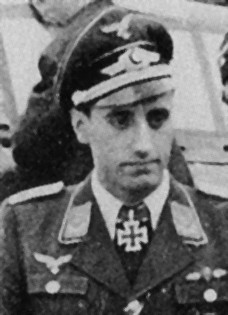
Heinz-Wolfgang Schnaufer, most successful night fighter pilot in aviation history

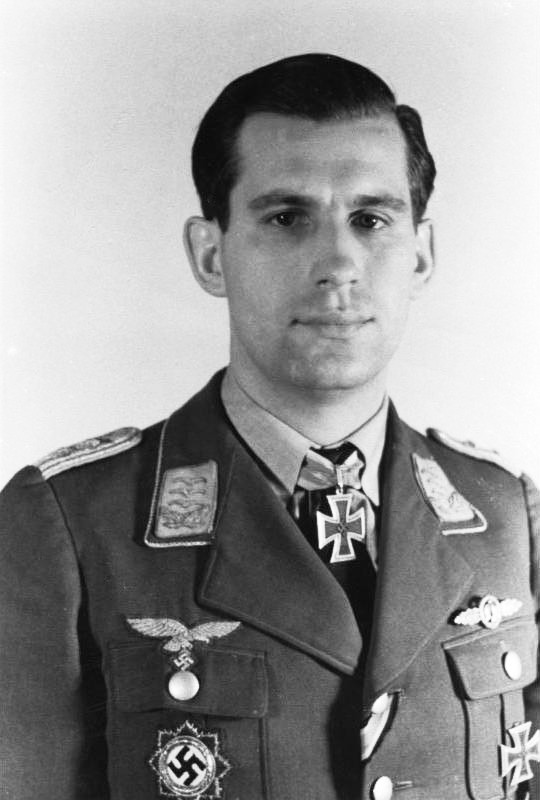
Paul Semrau, night fighter pilot

By surname: A–F • G–L • M–P • T–Z

This along with the * (asterisk), indicates that the pilot was either killed in action (KIA), missing in action (MIA), died of wounds (DOW), killed in a flying accident (KIFA), or killed in a car accident (KICA).
This and the / (slash) indicates information discrepancies listed by Aders, Boiten, Caldwell, Girbig, Held, Obermaier, Spick, Ring, Mathews, Foreman and Zabecki.

=== Q ===
Name	Rank	Claims	Unit	Notes
Wilhelm Quack*	Feldwebel	17	JG 54	KIA 8 January 1942
Klaus Quaet-Faslem*	Major	49	JG 53, JG 3	Knight's Cross; KIFA 30 January 1944
Richard Quante*	Oberfeldwebel	49/41	JG 51	KIA 14 August 1942
Josef Quarde*	Fähnrich	52	JG 54	KIA 5 March 1945
Karl-Heinz Quaritsch*	Leutnant	9	JG 53	KIA 14 June 1942
Ernst Quasinowski	Oberleutnant	19	J/88, JG 52	
Werner Quast	Fahnenjunker-Oberfeldwebel	84	JG 52	Knight's Cross
Gerhard Querengasser	Feldwebel	5+	JG 2	

=== R ===
Name	Rank	Claims	Unit	Notes
Walter Rabenstein*	Leutnant	5	JG 27	KIA 2 July 1944
Josef Rabieger	Oberfeldwebel	20+	JG 52	
Hans Rachner*	Oberleutnant	9	JG 3	KIA 7 July 1944
Rudolf Rademacher	Leutnant	126/93	JG 54, JG 7	Knight's Cross
Waldemar Radener	Oberleutnant	37/23	JG 26, JG 300	Knight's Cross
Heinz Radlauer	Feldwebel	15	JG 107, JG 108, JG 51	
Günther Radusch	Oberst	64 (+1 in Spain)	NJG 1, NJG 2, NJG 3	Knight's Cross with Oak Leaves
Gerhard Raht	Hauptmann	59/58/56	NJG 2	Knight's Cross with Oak Leaves
Alfons Raich	Oberleutnant	10	JG 3	
Gerhard Raimann*	Feldwebel	15	JG 54	KIA 20 February 1944
Günther Rall	Major	275/274	JG 52, JG 11	Knight's Cross with Oak Leaves and Swords mission-to-claim ratio of 2.26.
Karl Rammelt	Major	41	JG 51	Knight's Cross
Helmut Rampfel	Feldwebel	9	JG 52	
Hans Ransmayer*	Leutnant	36	JG 54	KIA 20 September 1944
Werner Rapp	Hauptmann	18/16	NJG 1, NJG 5	
Franz Rappl*	Oberfeldwebel	9	JG 51	KIA 12 March 1945
Hans Rasper	Leutnant	8	NJG 1, NJG 2, NJG 101	
Waldemar Rathke*	Oberleutnant	15	NJG 5, NJG 100	MIA March 1945
Fritz Rathofer*	Unteroffizier	9	JG 1	KIA 30 June 1944
Kurt Ratzlaff	Oberfeldwebel	45	JG 52	
Alfred Rauch	Leutnant	60	JG 51	Knight's Cross
Herbert Rauchfuß*	Unteroffizier	11	JG 54	KIA 22 July 1943
Alfred Rauer	Feldwebel	6	NJG 1	
Paul-Hubert Rauh	Hauptmann	31	NJG 4	Knight's Cross
Rudolf Rauhaus*	Feldwebel	5	JG 1	KIA 31 July 1944
Hans Raum	Oberleutnant	17/12	NJG 3	
Richard Raupach	Oberfähnrich	16	JG 54, EJGr Ost	
Karl Rechberger	Leutnant	5	NJG 3	
Friedrich Reckendorfer*	Feldwebel	9	JG 52	KIA 27 May 1944
Walter Recker	Oberfeldwebel	11	JG 53, EJG 2	
Karl-Wolfgang Redlich*	Major	43/41 (incl. 2 in Spain)/37	JG 27	Knight's Cross; KIA 29 May 1944
Hermann Reese	Oberleutnant	5	NJG 1, NJG 6	
Ludwig Reibel*	Oberfeldwebel	29	JG 53	KIA 20 December 1942
Günther Reich*	Unteroffizier	11	JG 3	KIA 2 October 1942
Hubert Reichelt*	Oberleutnant	5	ZG 1, NJG 200	KIA 3 November 1943
Fritz Reichenbach	Feldwebel	11	NJG 11	
Hans Reiff*	Fahnenjunker-Feldwebel	54	JG 3	KIA 2 December 1944
Gerhard Reiher	Oberfeldwebel	5	JG 52, JG 3, JG 7	
Ernst-Wilhelm Reinert	Oberleutnant	174/168	JG 77, JG 27	Knight's Cross with Oak Leaves and Swords
Hans-Günther Reinhard	Feldwebel	42	JG 54	
Otto Reinhard	Oberfeldwebel	8	JG 52	
Peter Reischer	Oberleutnant	20	JG 26	
Ernst Reitmeyer	Oberfeldwebel	23	NJG 5	
Hans Remmer*	Hauptmann	27/21	JG 27	Knight's Cross; KIA 2 April 1944
Anton Resch	Oberleutnant	91	JG 52	Knight's Cross
Rudolf Resch*	Major	94 (incl. 1 in Spain)	JG 52, JG 51	Knight's Cross; KIA 11 July 1943
Willi Reschke	Oberfeldwebel	28	JG 302, JG 301	Knight's Cross incl. 20 heavy bombers
Ralph von Rettberg	Oberst	8	ZG 26, ZG 1	Knight's Cross
Horst Reuter*	Leutnant	21	JG 27	KIA 27 May 1942
Ernst Richter	Oberfeldwebel	8	JG 54	
Hans Richter	Leutnant	22	JG 27	
Adolf Riedmeir	Oberfeldwebel	16	JG 52	
Erwin Riehl*	Oberfeldwebel	14	TrGr 186, JG 77	KIA 27 July 1941
Horst Riemann*	Hauptmann	5	JG 51	KIA 10 December 1942
Walter Riemer*	Feldwebel	5+	JG 5	KIA 19 July 1944
Ernst Riepe*	Feldwebel	6	JG 27	KIA 19 September 1941
Alfred Riha*	Leutnant	8	JG 3	KIA 28 July 1942
Bodo Ring*	Leutnant	8	JG 27	KIA 26 April 1945
Horst Rippert	Unteroffizier	18	JG 27, JG 200, JGr Süd	
Georg Rischbieter	Feldwebel	6	SKG 10, SG 4	
Franz Ritschel	Feldwebel	6	JG 1, JG 11	
Eckhard Roch	Oberleutnant	5	JG 26	
Gustav Rödel	Oberst	98	JG 27	Knight's Cross with Oak Leaves
Hans Roehrig*	Hauptmann	75	JG 53	Knight's Cross; KIA 13 July 1943
Detlev Rohwer	Hauptmann	38	JG 3, JG 1	Knight's Cross
Heinz Rökker	Hauptmann	64	NJG 2	Knight's Cross with Oak Leaves
Herbert Rollwage	Oberleutnant	102	JG 53	Knight's Cross with Oak Leaves
Oskar Romm	Oberleutnant	92	JG 51, JG 3	Knight's Cross
Heinrich Rosenberg	Oberleutnant	12	JG 27	
Theodor Rossiwall	Oberstleutnant	19 (incl. 2 in Spain)	ZG 76, NJG 4	Knight's Cross
Edmund Roßmann	Leutnant	93	JG 52	Knight's Cross
Willi Roth	Leutnant	20	JG 26, JG 103, JG 102, JV 44	
Günther Rübell	Hauptmann	50	JG 51, JG 104	Knight's Cross
Hans-Ulrich Rudel	Oberst	9+	SG 2	Knight's Cross with Golden Oak Leaves, Swords and Diamonds (sole recipient in the entire Wehrmacht)
Erich Rudorffer	Major	222/219	JG 2, JG 54, JG 7	Knight's Cross with Oak Leaves and Swords; 13 in one mission
Helmut Rüffler	Oberfeldwebel	98/88	JG 3	Knight's Cross
Franz Ruhl*	Oberleutnant	36	JG 3	Knight's Cross; KIA 24 December 1944
Bruno Rupp	Feldwebel	15	NJG 101, NJG 3	
Friedrich Rupp*	Oberleutnant	52	JG 54	Knight's Cross; KIA 15 May 1943
Kurt Ruppert*	Hauptmann	20	JG 26	KIA 13 June 1943
Dieter Rusche	Oberfeldwebel	7	JG 302, JG 301	
Otto Russ*	Leutnant	27	JG 53	KIA 2 July 1944
Heinrich Russel*	Oberfähnrich	5	JG 6, JG 7	KIA 9 March 1945
Karl Rüttger	Oberleutnant	39	JG 52	
Hartmut Ryll*	Leutnant	6	JG 77, JG 400	KIA 16 August 1944
Martin Rysavy	Oberleutnant	8	JG 26	

=== S ===
Name	Rank	Claims	Unit	Notes
Heinz Sachsenberg	Leutnant	104	JG 52	Knight's Cross
Florian Salwender	Feldwebel	25	JG 77, JG 5	POW Died in Soviet Prison
Carl Sattig*	Hauptmann	53	JG 54	Knight's Cross; KIA 10 August 1942
Erwin Sawallisch*	Oberfeldwebel	35	JG 27	Suicide
Heinrich Prinz zu Sayn-Wittgenstein*	Major	83/79	NJG 2, NJG 3	Knight's Cross with Oak Leaves and Swords; KIA 21/22 January 1944
Günther Schack	Hauptmann	174	JG 51, JG 3	Knight's Cross with Oak Leaves
Hans Schäfer	Feldwebel	6	JG 3	
Hans Schäfer	Oberleutnant	12	NJG 2, NJG 3	
Johann Schalk	Oberst	15	ZG 26, NJG 3, NJG 4	Knight's Cross
Franz Schall*	Hauptmann	137/133	JG 52, Kdo Nowotny, JG 7	Knight's Cross; KIFA 10 April 1945 mission-to-claim ratio of 4.01.
Ludwig Scharf	Unteroffizier	7+	JG 5	
Gerhard Schaschke	Hauptmann	19+	ZG 76	
Paul Schauder	Hauptmann	21	JG 26	
Jakob Schaus	Leutnant	23	NJG 4	
Günther Scheel*	Leutnant	71	JG 54	Knight's Cross; MIA 16 July 1943 only 70 combat missions, with a mission-to-claim ratio of 0.99.
Klaus Scheer	Leutnant	24/23	NJG 100	
Rudolf Scheffel	Hauptmann	7	ZG 1, ZG 26	Knight's Cross
Wolfgang Schellmann*	Oberstleutnant	26 (incl. 12 in Spain)	JG 2, JG 27	Knight's Cross; KIA 22 June 1941
Fritz Schellwat	Oberfeldwebel	19	NJG 1	
Wolfgang Schenck	Oberstleutnant	18	SG 2, ZG 1, SKG 210, KG 51	Knight's Cross with Oak Leaves
Georg Schentke*	Oberleutnant	90/87	JG 3	Knight's Cross; KIA 25 December 1942
Karl-Heinz Scherfling*	Oberfeldwebel	33	NJG 1	Knight's Cross; KIA 21 July 1944
Ernst Scheufele	Oberleutnant	14	JG 5, JG 4	
Erich Scheyda	Oberfeldwebel	20	JG 26	
Franz Schieß*	Hauptmann	67	JG 53	Knight's Cross; KIA 2 September 1943
Wilhelm Schilling	Oberleutnant	63	JG 54, EJG 1	Knight's Cross
Hans Schleef*	Oberleutnant	98	JG 3, JG 5, JG 4	Knight's Cross; KIA 31 December 1944
Hermann Schleinhege	Leutnant	97/96	JG 3, JG 54	Knight's Cross
Joachim Schlichting	Major	8 (incl. 5 in Spain)	JG 27	Knight's Cross
Gottfried Schlitzer*	Oberleutnant	14	JG 20, JG 51	DOW 10 August 1942
Karl-Friedrich Schlosstein	Hauptmann	5+	JG 77, JG 5	
Johann Schmid*	Major	45	JG 2, JG 26	Knight's Cross; KIA 6 November 1941 mission-to-claim ratio of 3.34.
Dietrich Schmidt	Hauptmann	39	NJG 1	Knight's Cross
Erich Schmidt*	Oberleutnant	47	JG 53	Knight's Cross; KIA 31 August 1941
Franz Schmidt*	Unteroffizier	6	JG 77	KIA 4 November 1941
Heinz Schmidt*	Hauptmann	173	JG 52	Knight's Cross with Oak Leaves; MIA 5 September 1943 mission-to-claim ratio of 4.05.
Johannes Schmidt	Oberleutnant	12	JG 26	
Rudolf Schmidt*	Feldwebel	42	JG 77	Knight's Cross; KIA 6 April 1942
Winfried Schmidt	Hauptmann	19	JG 3	
Lothar Schmitt	Leutnant	7	LG 2, SG 1	
Hans Schmoller-Haldy	Hauptmann	12	JG 54	
Heinz-Wolfgang Schnaufer	Major	121/119	NJG 1, NJG 4	Knight's Cross with Oak Leaves, Swords and Diamonds; Top Night Fighter Ace of World War II
August Schneider	Leutnant	9	JG 5	
Gerhard Schneider	Leutnant	41	JG 51, JGr Ost	
Hugo Schneider	Oberleutnant	6	JG 27	
Walter Schneider	Oberleutnant	20	JG 26	
Karl-Heinz Schnell	Major	72	JG 51, JG 53, JV 44	Knight's Cross
"Wumm" Siegfried Schnell*	Major	93	JG 54, JG 2	Knight's Cross with Oak Leaves; KIA 25 February 1944
Karl "Quax" Schnörrer	Leutnant	46	JG 54, JG 7, Kdo Nowotny	Knight's Cross
Herbert Schob	Hauptmann	28 (incl. 6 in Spain)	LG 1, ZG 76, ZG 26	Knight's Cross
Rudolf Schoenert	Major	64	NJG 1, NJG 2, NJG 3, NJG 100, NJGr 10, NJG 5	Knight's Cross with Oak Leaves
Erich Schöfbock	Leutnant	8	JG 27	
Günther Scholz	Major	34 (+1 in Spain)	JG 54, JG 5	
Helmut Schönfelder	Oberfeldwebel	56	JG 51	Knight's Cross
Gerhard Schöpfel	Major	45	JG 26, JG 4, JG 6	Knight's Cross
Georg Schott*	Oberleutnant	21	LG 2, JG 1	KIA 27 September 1943
Herbert Schramm*	Hauptmann	40	JG 53, JG 27	Knight's Cross with Oak Leaves; KIA 1 December 1943
Alfred Schreiber*	Leutnant	5	ZG 26, EKdo 262, Kdo Nowotny, JG 7	KIFA 26 November 1944
Georg Schröder	Hauptmann	12	JG 2	
Werner Schröer	Major	114/106	JG 3, JG 27, JG 54	Knight's Cross with Oak Leaves and Swords incl. 26 heavy bombers mission-to-claim ratio of 1.73.
Fritz Schröter	Major	11	JG 2, SKG 10, SG 5, SG 4	Knight's Cross
Walter Schuck	Oberleutnant	206/181	JG 5, JG 7	Knight's Cross with Oak Leaves
Norbert Schücking	Feldwebel	9	JG 11	
Leo Schuhmacher	Leutnant	23/8+	ZG 76, JG 1, JV 44	Knight's Cross
Fritz Schuler*	Feldwebel	6	JG 2	
Franz Schulte*	Oberfeldwebel	46	JG 77	Knight's Cross; KIA 12 August 1942
Helmuth Schulte	Hauptmann	25	NJG 5	Knight's Cross
Otto Schultz	Hauptmann	73	JG 51	Knight's Cross
Gerhard Schulwitz	Leutnant	9	JG 26	
Otto Schulz*	Oberleutnant	51	JG 27	Knight's Cross; KIA 17 June 1942
Werner Schumacher	Unteroffizier	30	JG 5	
Heinz Schumann*	Major	21	JG 51, JG 2 SKG 10	Knight's Cross; KIFA 8 November 1943
Franz Schwaiger*	Leutnant	67	JG 3	Knight's Cross; KIA 24 April 1944
Günther Schwanecke	Hauptmann	14	JG 77, JG 5	
Gerhard Schwartz	Feldwebel	20	JG 51	
Günther Schwarz	Oberfeldwebel	40/38	JG 51	
Georg Seckel	Hauptmann	34	JG 77, JG 200, JG 4	
Günther Seeger	Oberleutnant	56	JG 53, JG 2	Knight's Cross
Georg Seelmann	Oberleutnant	39	JG 51, JG 103	Knight's Cross
Hermann Segatz	Hauptmann	40/33	JG 26, JG 51, JG 5, JG 1	
Georg Seidel	Oberfeldwebel	47/45	JG 51	
Alfred Seidl	Oberleutnant	31	JG 53, JG 3, JG 7	
Johannes Seifert*	Oberstleutnant	57	JG 26	Knight's Cross; KIA 25 November 1943
Reinhard Seiler	Major	109 (incl. 9 in Spain)	JG 54, JG 104	Knight's Cross with Oak Leaves
Erich von Selle		7	JG 26	
Waldemar Semelka	Leutnant	65	JG 52	Knight's Cross mission-to-claim ratio of 3.69.
Paul Semrau*	Major	46	NJG 2	Knight's Cross with Oak Leaves; KIA 8 February 1945
Fritz Sengschmitt		15	ZG 76, ZG 26	
Heinrich Setz*	Major	138	JG 27, JG 77	Knight's Cross with Oak Leaves; KIA 13 March 1943 mission-to-claim ratio of 1.99.
Peter Siegler*	Feldwebel	48	JG 54	Knight's Cross; MIA 24 September 1942
Rudolf Sigmund*	Hauptmann	29	NJG 1	Knight's Cross; KIA 4 October 1943
Friedrich Simon	Oberfeldwebel	22+	JG 51	
Siegfried Simsch	Hauptmann	54	JG 52, JG 11	Knight's Cross; KIA 8 June 1944
Rudolf Sinner	Major	39	JG 27	
Kurt Sochatzy	Oberleutnant	38	JG 3	Knight's Cross
Waldemar Söffing	Leutnant	35	JG 26	
Gerhard Sommer*	Hauptmann	20	JG 11, JG 1	Knight's Cross; KIA 12 May 1944
Hermann Sommer*	Oberfeldwebel	19	NJG 2, NJG 102	KIA 11 February 1944
Wolfgang Späte	Major	99	JG 54, JG 400, JG 7	Knight's Cross with Oak Leaves
Günther Specht*	Oberstleutnant	34	ZG 26, JG 11	Knight's Cross; MIA 1 January 1945
Wilhelm Spies*	Major	20	ZG 26	Knight's Cross with Oak Leaves; KIA 27 January 1942
Robert Spreckles	Oberfeldwebel	6+	JG 11, JG 1	
Peter Spoden	Hauptmann	24/23	NJG 5, NJG 6	
Gustav Sprick	Oberleutnant	31	JG 26	Knight's Cross
Karl Stadek	Oberfeldwebel	25+	JG 51	
Hans-Arnold Stahlschmidt*	Oberleutnant	60	JG 27	Knight's Cross with Oak Leaves; MIA 7 September 1942
Hermann Staiger	Major	63	JG 51, JG 26, JG 1, JG 7	Knight's Cross incl. 26 heavy bombers
Friedrich-Wilhelm Stakejahn		9	JG 5, SG 4	
Otto Stammberger	Oberleutnant	7	JG 26	
Hans Stechmann	Oberfeldwebel	41/32	TrGr 186, JG 3, JG 107, JG 108	Knight's Cross
Karl Steffen*	Oberfeldwebel	59	JG 52	Knight's Cross; MIA 8 August 1943
Hans-Joachim Steffens*	Leutnant	21	JG 51	KIA 30 July 1941
Friedrich "Fritz" Stehle	Oberleutnant	21	ZG 2, ZG 26, JG 6, JG 7	German Cross
Leopold "Bazi" Steinbatz*	Leutnant	99/98	JG 52	Knight's Cross with Oak Leaves and Swords; KIA 23 June 1942
Franz Steiner	Oberfeldwebel	8	JG 27, JG 1, JG 11, JV 44	
Günter Steinhausen*	Leutnant	40	JG 27	Knight's Cross; KIA 6 September 1942
Ulrich Steinhilper	Oberleutnant	5	JG 52	
"Macky" Johannes Steinhoff	Oberst	176/168	JG 26, JG 52, JG 77	Knight's Cross with Oak Leaves and Swords
Wilhelm Steinmann	Major	44	JG 27, JG 4, JV 44	Knight's Cross
Heinrich Steis	Leutnant	20	JG 27	German Cross
Andreas Sterl	Oberfeldwebel	54	JG 52	German Cross
Heinrich Sterr*	Oberleutnant	130	JG 54	Knight's Cross; KIA 26 November 1944
Franz Stigler	Oberleutnant	26	JG 27, JV 44	German Cross
Bruno Stolle	Hauptmann	35	LG 1, JG 2, JG 11	Knight's Cross
Johann "Hans" Stollnberger	Hauptmann	45/10+	LG 2, SG 4, SG 10, SG 101	Knight's Cross
Paul Stolte*	Hauptmann	44	JG 3, JG 1	KIA 10 October 1943
"Max" Maximilian Stotz*	Hauptmann	189/182	JG 54	Knight's Cross with Oak Leaves; MIA 19 August 1943 mission-to-claim ratio of 2.65.
Friedrich-Wilhelm Strakeljahn*	Hauptmann	9	JG 5, SG 4	Knight's Cross; KIA 6 July 1944
Hubert Strassl*	Oberfeldwebel	67	JG 51	Knight's Cross; KIA 8 July 1943 mission-to-claim ratio of 3.30.
Erwin Straznicky*	Oberleutnant	30	LG 2, JG 77, JG 3	MIA 3 October 1942
Werner Streib	Oberst	66	NJG 1	Knight's Cross with Oak Leaves and Swords
Hans Strelow*	Leutnant	68	JG 51	Knight's Cross with Oak Leaves; KIA 22 May 1942 mission-to-claim ratio of 2.94.
Fritz Stritzel	Stabsfeldwebel	11	JG 2	
Karl Strohecker	Oberfeldwebel	14	NJG 100	
Heinz Strüning*	Hauptmann	56	ZG 26, KG 30, NJG 2, NJG 1	Knight's Cross with Oak Leaves; KIA 25 December 1944
Werner Stumpf*	Oberfeldwebel	48	JG 53	Knight's Cross; KIA 13 October 1942
Gustav Sturm	Leutnant	21	JG 27, JG 3, JG 51, EJG 2, JG 7	
Heinrich Sturm*	Hauptmann	158/157	JG 52	Knight's Cross; KIA 22 December 1944
Alfred Surau	Leutnant	45	JG 3	
Ernst Süß*	Oberleutnant	68	JG 52	Knight's Cross; KIA 20 December 1943
Paul Szameitat*	Hauptmann	29	NJG 3	Knight's Cross; KIA 2 January 1944
Wilhelm Szuggar	Oberfeldwebel	10 (incl. 5 in Spain)	JG 52, JG 26	
