= Rudolf Frank =

German fighter ace and Knight's Cross recipient

- Frank as Oberfeldwebel
- Born: 19 August 1920; Karlsruhe-Grünwinkel, Republic of Baden, Weimar Republic
- Died: 27 April 1944 (aged 23); Heeze, German-occupied Netherlands
- Cause of death: Killed in action
- Burial place: Ysselsteyn, Netherlands (Block Z—Row 6—Grave 149)
- Military career
- Allegiance: Nazi Germany
- Branch: Luftwaffe
- Service years: 1939–1944
- Rank: Leutnant (posthumously)
- Unit: NJG 3
- Conflicts: World War II: Defense of the Reich †
- Awards: Knight's Cross of the Iron Cross with Oak Leaves (posthumously)

Rudolf Frank (19 August 1920 – 27 April 1944) was a German Luftwaffe military aviator during World War II, a night fighter ace credited with 45 enemy aircraft shot down in 183 combat missions. All of his victories were claimed over the Western Front in nocturnal Defense of the Reich missions against the Royal Air Force's Bomber Command.

Born in Karlsruhe-Grünwinkel, Frank volunteered for military service in the Luftwaffe of Nazi Germany in 1939 after finishing school. Following flight training, he was posted to Nachtjagdgeschwader 3 (NJG 3—3rd Night Fighter Wing) in 1941. He was awarded the Knight's Cross of the Iron Cross on 6 April 1944 following his 42nd aerial victory. Three weeks later, on 27 April 1944, he and his crew attacked an Avro Lancaster, which exploded and fatally damaged their own aircraft. Frank ordered his crew to bail out but was unable to save himself. He received posthumous promotion to Leutnant (second lieutenant) and was awarded the Knight's Cross of the Iron Cross with Oak Leaves.

== Early life and career ==
Frank was born on 19 August 1920 in Karlsruhe-Grünwinkel in what was the Republic of Baden of the Weimar Republic; Grünwinkel is now a borough located in the southwest suburbs of Karlsruhe. Frank was the older of two sons of a shoemaker. He attended the Volksschule (elementary school) in Grünwinkel from 1926 to 1930, when he was enrolled in the Realgymnasium—a secondary school built on the mid-level Realschule—where he attained his Mittlere Reife (school leaving certificate) in 1939.

Even as a boy, Frank had wanted to become a pilot. World War II had begun on 1 September 1939 and he volunteered for military service in the Luftwaffe. Following his basic military training, he took flying instruction at the pilot school in Zeltweg. Here he qualified to fly the Bücker Bü 131, Bü 133 and Bü 181, the Klemm Kl 35, the Arado Ar 66, Ar 68 and Ar 96, the Focke-Wulf Fw 58, and the Junkers W 34 and Junkers Ju 52. (Note: Flight training in the Luftwaffe progressed through the levels A1, A2 and B1, B2, referred to as A/B flight training. A training included theoretical and practical training in aerobatics, navigation, long-distance flights and dead-stick landings. The B courses included high-altitude flights, instrument flights, night landings and training to handle the aircraft in difficult situations. For pilots destined to fly multi-engine aircraft, the training was completed with the Luftwaffe Advanced Pilot's Certificate (Erweiterter Luftwaffen-Flugzeugführerschein), also known as the C-Certificate.) In October 1940 he transferred to Nachtjagdschule 1 (1st Night Fighter School) at Schleißheim near Munich, formerly the Zerstörerschule 1 (ZS 1—1st Destroyer School). There he specialized as a night fighter pilot in the 2nd Squadron under the command of Staffelkapitän (squadron leader) Oberleutnant (First Lieutenant) Günther Specht.

== World War II ==
A map of part of the Kammhuber Line. The 'belt' and night fighter 'boxes' are shown.

World War II in Europe began on Friday 1 September 1939 when German forces invaded Poland. Following the 1939 aerial Battle of the Heligoland Bight, Royal Air Force (RAF) attacks shifted to the cover of darkness, initiating the Defence of the Reich campaign. By mid-1940, Generalmajor (Brigadier General) Josef Kammhuber had established a night air defense system dubbed the Kammhuber Line. It consisted of a series of control sectors equipped with radars and searchlights and an associated night fighter. Each sector named a Himmelbett (canopy bed) would direct the night fighter into visual range with target bombers. In 1941, the Luftwaffe started equipping night fighters with airborne radar such as the Lichtenstein radar. This airborne radar did not come into general use until early 1942.

Frank was posted to the 1. Ergänzungsstaffel (1st Supplemental Training Squadron) of Nachtjagdgeschwader 3 (NJG 3—3rd Night Fighter Wing) on 5 February 1941. (Note: For an explanation of Luftwaffe unit designations, see Organization of the Luftwaffe during World War II.) The unit was stationed at Stuttgart-Echterdingen (now Stuttgart Airport). Initially he flew with radio operator (Bordfunker) Gefreiter (Private) Willimowski before Hans-Georg Schierholz was assigned as his permanent radio operator. Frank and Schierholz had already formed a crew at the Nachtjagdschule 1 at Schleißheim. The two were then assigned to 1. Staffel (1st Squadron) of NJG 3 stationed at Vechta. 1. Staffel was under the command of Staffelkapitän Oberleutnant Walter Milius. This unit was equipped with the C-variant of the Messerschmitt Bf 110 heavy fighter. Both Frank and Schierholz were promoted to the rank of Gefreiter on 1 March 1941.

=== Night fighter pilot ===
Frank and Schierholz flew Bf 110 C-4 "L1+GH" on their first operational combat mission on 9 May 1941, without success. They flew their second mission on 12 May and another nine missions before claiming their first aerial victory during the night of 3/4 July. The mission started at 22:45 from Oldenburg and intercepted a Royal Air Force (RAF) Vickers Wellington at 00:54, which crashed 10 kilometers (6.2 miles) north of Grafeld/Oldenburg. For this achievement, Frank and Schierholz were awarded the Iron Cross 2nd Class (Eisernes Kreuz 2. Klasse). On 15 July, they claimed their second victory, a Handley Page Halifax that they shot down at 01:05 northwest of Meppen. The victory was, however, credited to the anti-aircraft artillery.

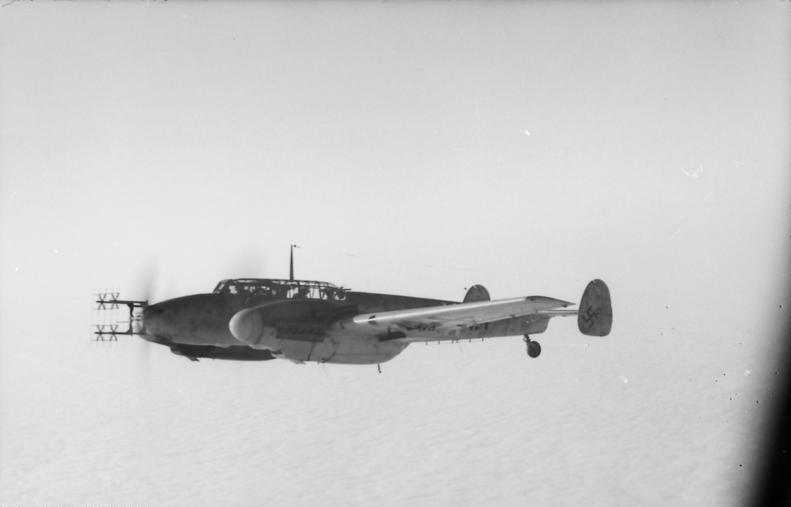
Messerschmitt Bf 110 G-4 of NJG 3 similar to those flown by Frank.

By 13 August 1941, Frank had flown 20 night fighter missions. For this achievement, he was awarded the Front Flying Clasp of the Luftwaffe for Night Fighters in Bronze (Frontflugspange für Nachtjäger in Bronze) and was promoted to Unteroffizier (sergeant). He was credited with his second victory on 15 September 1941, a Wellington shot down at 23:30 northwest of Meppen. This was also his last claim in 1941. He achieved his third victory, a Handley Page Hampden he shot down at 21:03 on 21 January 1942 near Berge in northeast Lingen. Five days later he claimed an Armstrong Whitworth Whitley Mk V, shot down at 20:36 west of Quakenbrück.

Frank was awarded the Iron Cross 1st Class (Eisernes Kreuz 1. Klasse) on 15 April 1942 and two months later, on 18 June 1942, the Front Flying Clasp of the Luftwaffe for Night Fighters in Silver (Frontflugspange für Nachtjäger in Silber). On 30 June 1942 at 01:29, he and Schierholz took off from Vechta on their 64th combat mission. While attacking a British bomber, either a Wellington or Halifax, their aircraft was hit by the defensive fire from the tail gun position at 02:40. With both radiators destroyed, they bailed out from their aircraft.

Frank's Gruppe (group) relocated to Rheine in Westphalia on 28 July 1942, when he flew further missions with Dornier Do 217 J "D5+G5", a night fighter variant of the Do 217. He claimed a Wellington shot down at 02:05 on 14 September 1942; it crashed in the vicinity of Osnabrück, and was his only victory while flying a Do 217. On this mission, the Dornier suffered engine problems and Frank made a forced landing at Bad Zwischenahn, damaging the aircraft. He ended the year 1942 with seven confirmed victories to his credit.

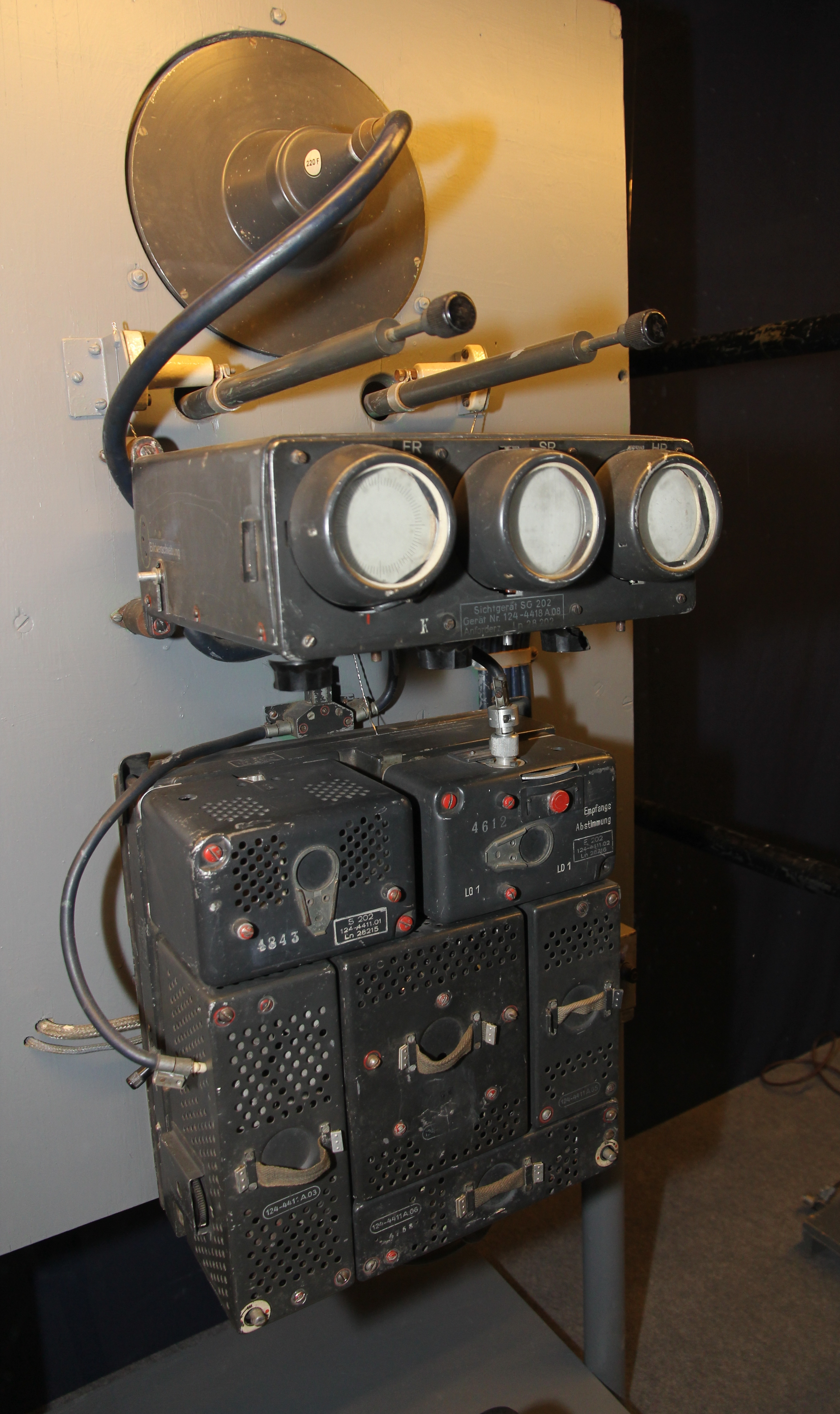
Lichtenstein cathode-ray tubes: • The left tube indicated other aircraft ahead as bumps. • The center tube indicated range to a specific target and whether they were higher or lower. • The right tube indicated whether the target was to left or right.

The first victory Frank claimed in 1943 occurred on 3 March. Again flying a Bf 110, he shot down a Short Stirling south of Delmenhorst. Contact with three other enemy bombers did not lead to any victories. Frank flew further missions in Do 217 "D5+LK" on a target practice mission on 9 April 1943. The right landing gear collapsed during the landing, causing 10% damage to the aircraft. Three days later he made an error during the landing approach, crashing Do 217 "D5+IK" and causing 30% damage. Frank avoided an official reprimand for either crash.

On 1 April 1943, Frank and Schierholz were transferred to the 2. Staffel of NJG 3, which was located at Wittmundhafen. Here they underwent conversion training to the Junkers Ju 88 C-6, which was designed for long-distance night fighter operations. While Frank was training, his old unit was relocated to Gilze-Rijen in the Netherlands. His unit also received the newer G-version of the Bf 110; these were equipped with SN-2 Lichtenstein radar. When Frank and Schierholz returned from conversion training, they were assigned Bf 110 G-4 "D5+CH" to fly as their personal aircraft. They claimed a Lancaster(ED810) near Antwerp on 15 June 1943. Two days later, on 17 June, they intercepted and shot down three more Lancasters from a force returning from a mission against Cologne. The three Lancasters came down within 41 minutes of each other over the Scheldt Estuary.

Frank claimed his 13th victory, a Wellington, on 22 June. While attempting another attack, both radiators were shot out and the crew was again forced to bail out. On 4 July they shot down a Halifax bomber north of Antwerp; this was his 14th victory overall. The unit relocated to Juvincourt, France, on 16 July 1943, Frank was awarded the Honor Goblet of the Luftwaffe (Ehrenpokal der Luftwaffe) on 9 August 1943. Now flying Ju 88 C-6 "D5+EK", again from Wittmundhafen, he claimed three aircraft shot down on 24 August 1944, but only received credit for the Short Stirling shot down at 00:47 over Berlin. Following his 110th operational mission, he was awarded the Front Flying Clasp of the Luftwaffe for Night Fighters in Gold (Frontflugspange für Nachtjäger in Gold) on 18 August 1943.

Around this time in 1943, the two-man Bf 110 crew was augmented by a third member, sometimes referred to as Bordmechaniker (air mechanic) or Bordschütze (air gunner). On 31 August, Frank shot down two British bombers, a Halifax northwest of Venlo and a Lancaster east of Diepholz, during separate combat missions. On 2 September, his aircraft was hit in the right engine by enemy fire and he was forced to belly-land the Ju 88 "D5+DK" at Wilhelmshaven, suffering 20% damage to the aircraft. He claimed his 20th victory on the night of 23/24 September 1943. He added two more victories and on 17 October 1943 received the German Cross in Gold (Deutsches Kreuz in Gold). The next day his aircraft was hit by German anti-aircraft artillery and Frank was forced to make a landing at Vechta on one engine. He was posted to the 3. Staffel on 14 December and ended the year with 26 aerial victories to his credit. A British intruder night-fighter shot Frank and his crew down over Berlin in a Junkers Ju 88 C-6, "D5+HP", on 24 December 1943, but they all managed to bail out unharmed.

=== Knight's Cross of the Iron Cross ===
Frank claimed his first victories of 1944, a Lancaster and a Wellington, on 21 January 1944 near Magdeburg. Having been promoted to Feldwebel (staff sergeant), Frank was assigned to the Stab (headquarters unit) of NJG 3, under the command of Geschwaderkommodore (Wing Commander) Oberstleutnant (Lieutenant Colonel) Helmut Lent. Frank's previous 6. Staffel had been transferred to Nachtjagdgeschwader 1 (NJG 1—1st Night Fighter Wing), where it continued operations under the designation of 12. Staffel.

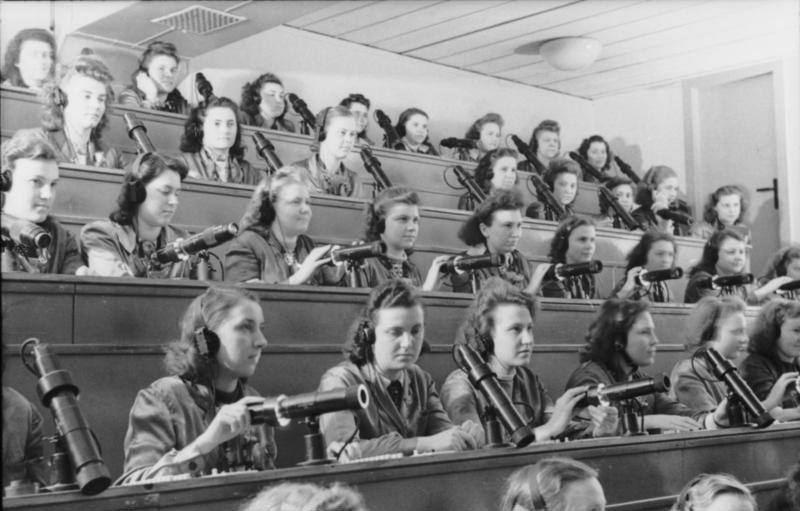
Luftwaffenhelferinen helped plot the course of enemy bombers.

On 20 February 1944, between 01:53 to 05:04, Frank became an "ace-in-a-day", shooting down five Lancaster bombers on their way to attack Leipzig. He was sent on a mission against intruding de Havilland Mosquito night-fighters on 7 March, but did not achieve any victories. He claimed his next victories on 22 March, a Lancaster shot down near Osnabrück and a Halifax near Gütersloh. On the same mission, while attacking a third bomber, his Messerschmitt Bf 110 "D5+BL" was damaged. An incendiary bomb, probably released by the bomber, penetrated the right wing and damaged the engine. Frank managed to bring the aircraft down at Gießen.

Three more bombers shot down on 25 March took Frank's total to 39 aerial victories. The Luftwaffe had its most successful night of the war on 30 March 1944. The entire night-fighter force was credited with the destruction of 132 enemy aircraft that night; Frank, who was credited with a further three bombers, brought his total to 42. For this achievement Oberfeldwebel (Senior Staff Sergeant) Frank was awarded the Knight's Cross of the Iron Cross (Ritterkreuz des Eisernen Kreuzes) on 6 April 1944. The presentation was made by Generalleutnant Joseph Schmid, commander of the I. Jagdkorps, at his headquarters in Braunschweig-Waggum on 10 April 1944. Frank then went on a short vacation at home with his wife Lisa, a Luftwaffenhelferin (female air force helper).

Following his vacation, Frank claimed two victories on 23 April 1944, a Halifax shot down at 02:11 north of Geldern and, later that day, a Short Stirling at 23:47 over Lolland. The Stirling was on a minelaying operation. (Note: The story and fate of No. 76 Squadron Halifax MZ578/MP-I is described by the former crew-member, Tom Wingham, in his book "Halifax Down!: On the Run from the Gestapo, 1944".)

=== Death and posthumous honors ===
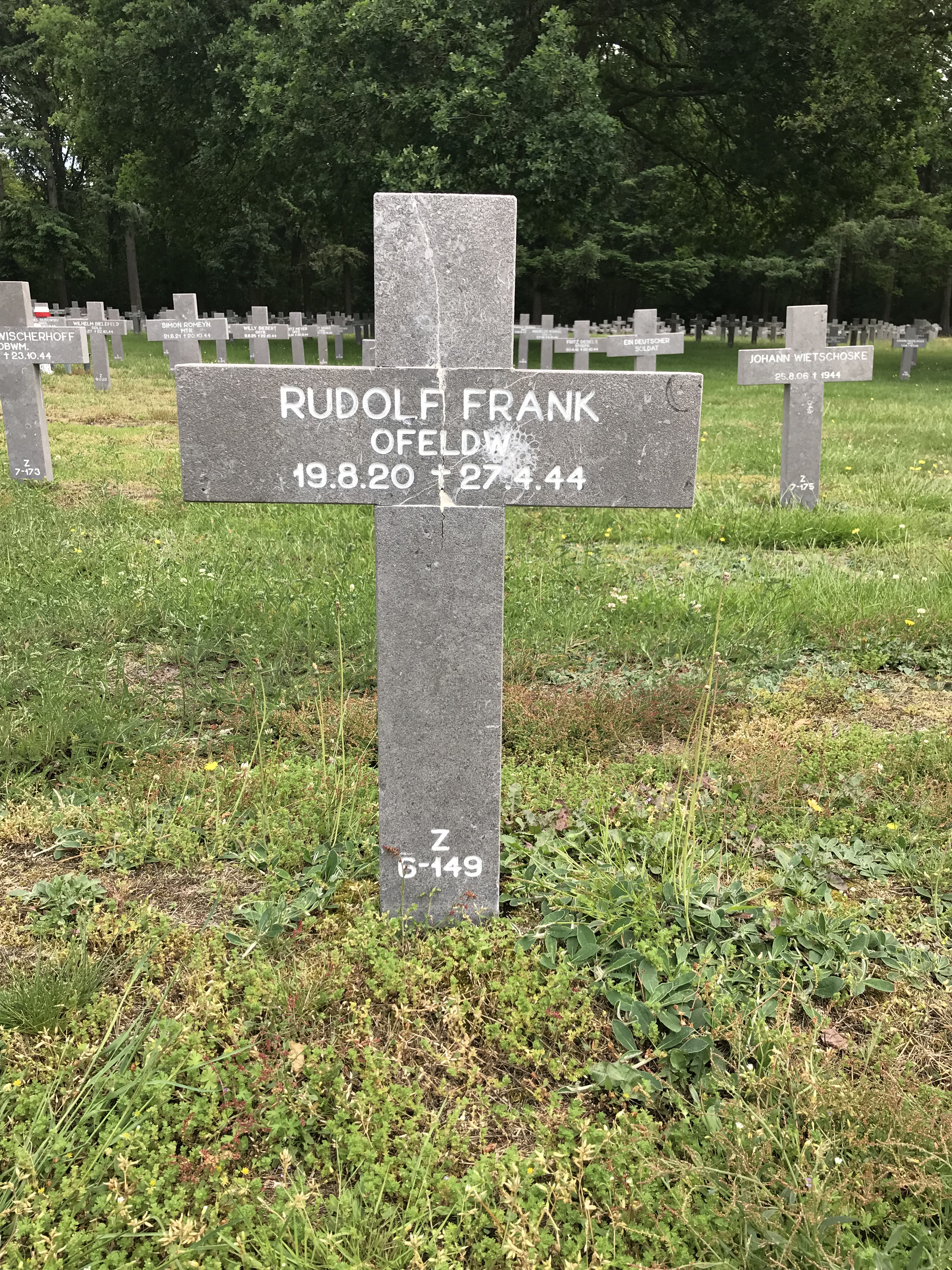
His grave at the German war cemetery Ysselsteyn

Frank was assigned Junkers Ju 88 (Werknummer 751 095—factory number) on 17 April 1944. He never flew this aircraft operationally. Ten days later, on the night of 26/27 April, he and his crew of radio operator Oberfeldwebel Schierholz and air mechanic Feldwebel Heinz Schneider took off in Messerschmitt Bf 110 G-4 "D5+CL" (Werknummer 720074) from Vechta. The mission was to intercept incoming bombers heading for the Ruhr Area.

The crew spotted and attacked an Avro Lancaster bomber over the vicinity of Eindhoven in the Netherlands. The bomber, severely hit by cannon fire at 01:58, exploded and became Frank's 45th and last aerial victory. Pilot Officer George Edwin Nicholls and his crew were killed. Debris from the Lancaster tore off the Messerschmitt's right wing and Frank lost control of the aircraft. He gave the order to bail out. Schierholz and Schneider parachuted to safety but Frank failed to get out in time. He was killed when the Bf 110 crashed at Heeze, 9 kilometers (5.6 mi) southeast of Eindhoven.

Frank was buried at the German War Cemetery Ysselsteyn (Block Z—Row 6—Grave 149) at Venray. The funeral was attended by his parents, his crew Schierholz and Schneider, his Gruppenkommandeur Hauptmann Werner Husemann, the fighter operations leader for the Holland and Ruhr area Generalleutnant Walter Grabmann, and Generalmajor Ernst Exss, the airfield sector commander.

On 20 July 1944, Frank was posthumously awarded the Knight's Cross of the Iron Cross with Oak Leaves (Ritterkreuz des Eisernen Kreuzes mit Eichenlaub), the 531st soldier or officer of the Wehrmacht to receive this award. On 27 April Lent submitted a request to the I. Jagdkorps, recommending Frank for a promotion to Leutnant (second lieutenant). The commander of the 2nd Fighter Division Generalmajor Max Ibel as well as Schmid were supportive of the request. Frank was posthumously promoted Leutnant, backdated to 1 April 1944.

== Summary of career ==
=== Aerial victory claims ===
According to Spick, Frank was credited with 45 aerial victories claimed in 183 combat missions. Aders and Obermaier also lists him with 45 aerial victories claimed in 183 combat missions. (Note: For a list of Luftwaffe night fighter aces see List of German World War II night fighter aces.) Mathews and Foreman, authors of Luftwaffe Aces — Biographies and Victory Claims, researched the German Federal Archives and found records for 43 aerial victories, plus two further unconfirmed claims. All of his aerial victories were claimed in nocturnal combat on the Western Front.

Victory claims were logged to a map-reference (PQ = Planquadrat), for example "PQ GR-2". The Luftwaffe grid map (Jägermeldenetz) covered all of Europe, western Russia and North Africa and was composed of rectangles measuring 15 minutes of latitude by 30 minutes of longitude, an area of about 360 square miles (930 km^{2}). These sectors were then subdivided into 36 smaller units to give a location area 3 km × 4 km (1.9 mi × 2.5 mi) in size.

Chronicle of aerial victories
This and the ♠ (Ace of spades) indicates those aerial victories which made Frank an "ace-in-a-day", a term which designates a fighter pilot who has shot down five or more airplanes in a single day. This and the – (dash) indicates unconfirmed aerial victory claims for which Frank did not receive credit. This and the ? (question mark) indicates information discrepancies listed by Schumann, Foreman, Parry and Mathews.
Claim	Date	Time	Type	Location	Unit	Serial No./Squadron No.
– Messerschmitt Bf 110 C-4 L1+GH –
1? ? (Note: According to Mathews and Foreman this claim is unconfirmed.)	4 July 1941	00:36? (Note: According to Schumann claimed at 00:54.)	Vickers Wellington	10 km (6.2 mi) north of Grafeld/Oldenburg	1./NJG 3	
— (Note: This claim is not listed by Foreman, Parry and Mathews.)	15 July 1941	01:05	Handley Page Halifax	northwest of Meppen	1./NJG 3	
– Messerschmitt Bf 110 D-3 L1+DH –
2?	15 September 1941	23:30	Vickers Wellington	northwest of Meppen	1./NJG 3	Wellington R1015/KX-L No. 311 Squadron RAF
– Messerschmitt Bf 110 E-2 D5+EH –
3	21 January 1942	21:03	Handley Page Hampden	near Berge (northeast Lingen)	1./NJG 3	
– Messerschmitt Bf 110 E-2 D5+HH –
4	26 January 1942	20:36	Armstrong Whitworth Whitley	west of Quakenbrück	1./NJG 3	
5	3 July 1942	01:26? (Note: According to Schumann claimed at 01:45.)	Vickers Wellington	5 km (3.1 mi) north of Cloppenburg	1./NJG 3	Wellington R1617/ PM-T No. 103 Squadron RAF
6	3 July 1942	02:31? (Note: According to Schumann claimed at 02:13.)	Vickers Wellington	20 km (12 mi) southwest of Vechta	1./NJG 3	Wellington Z1381/UV-H No. 460 Squadron RAAF
– Dornier Do 217 J D5+GH –
7	14 September 1942	03:10? (Note: According to Schumann claimed at 03:42.)	Vickers Wellington	10 km (6.2 mi) east of Lingen; 10 km (6.2 mi) northeast of Hardenberg	1./NJG 3	
– Messerschmitt Bf 110 C-2 D5+BH –
8	3 March 1943	22:10? (Note: According to Schumann claimed at 22:22.)	Short Stirling	south of Delmenhorst	1./NJG 3	
– Messerschmitt Bf 110 G-4 D5+CH –
9	15 June 1943	00:53? (Note: According to Schumann claimed at 01:24.)	Avro Lancaster III	Antwerp; 8 km (5.0 mi) north of Antwerp	2./NJG 1	Lancaster ED810/VN-Z No. 50 Squadron RAF
10	17 June 1943	00:45? (Note: According to Schumann claimed at 00:58.)	Avro Lancaster	Scheldt Estuary; Lier	2./NJG 1	Lancaster ED840/GT- No. 156 Squadron RAF
11	17 June 1943	01:00? (Note: According to Schumann claimed at 01:18.)	Avro Lancaster	Scheldt Estuary; Moorleghem	2./NJG 1	Lancaster ED553/HW-R No. 100 Squadron RAF
12	17 June 1943	01:46? (Note: According to Schumann claimed at 01:39.)	Avro Lancaster	Scheldt Estuary northeast of Breskens	2./NJG 1	
13	22 June 1943	01:24	Vickers Wellington	20 km (12 mi) east of Antwerp; Gramersweil	2./NJG 1	Wellington HE347/SM-F No. 305 Polish Bomber Squadron
– Messerschmitt Bf 110 G-4 D5+BH –
14	4 July 1943	01:06	Handley Page Halifax	north of Antwerp; Huissen	2./NJG 1	Halifax JD159/VR-Y No. 419 Bomber Squadron RCAF
– Junkers Ju 88 C-6 D5+EK –
15	24 August 1943	01:05? (Note: According to Schumann claimed at 00:47.)	Short Stirling	Berlin northwest of Berlin	2./NJG 3	
16	31 August 1943	03:43	Handley Page Halifax	northwest of Venlo; Mönchengladbach	2./NJG 3	
17	31 August 1943	23:28	Avro Lancaster	east of Diepholz	2./NJG 3	
– Junkers Ju 88 C-6 D5+DK –
18	6 September 1943	00:50? (Note: According to Schumann claimed at 00:14.)	Handley Page Halifax	Saargebiet south-southeast of Mannheim	2./NJG 3	Stirling EE964/ZO-F No. 196 Squadron RAF
– Junkers Ju 88 C-6 D5+LK –
19	22 September 1943	22:39? (Note: According to Schumann claimed at 23:35.)	Handley Page Halifax	Hanover	2./NJG 3	
– Junkers Ju 88 C-6 D5+KK –
20	23 September 1943	23:42	Avro Lancaster	Mannheim	2./NJG 3	Lancaster JA977/SR-J No. 101 Squadron RAF
– Junkers Ju 88 C-6 D5+LK –
21	3 October 1943	21:56	Handley Page Halifax	northwest of Bad Zwischenahn; 15 km (9.3 mi) southwest of Oldenburg	2./NJG 3	
22	8 October 1943	00:32? (Note: According to Schumann claimed at 00:16.)	Vickers Wellington	30 km (19 mi) north of Norderney	2./NJG 3	
– Junkers Ju 88 C-6 D5+IK –
23	18 November 1943	23:11? (Note: According to Schumann claimed at 23:12.)	Avro Lancaster	east of Lingen	2./NJG 3	
– Junkers Ju 88 C-6 D5+AK –
24?	26 November 1943	22:22	Avro Lancaster	west of Quakenbrück		
– Junkers Ju 88 C-6 D5+IK –
25?	26 November 1943	23:30	Avro Lancaster	east of Papenburg		
26	16 December 1943	19:15? (Note: According to Schumann claimed at 21:49.)	Avro Lancaster	east of Dümmer See	6./NJG 3	Lancaster ED411/AS-H2 No. 166 Squadron RAF
– Junkers Ju 88 C-6 D5+IP –
27	21 January 1944	22:59? (Note: According to Schumann claimed at 22:57.)	Avro Lancaster	Magdeburg	6./NJG 3	Halifax LL176/ZL-Q No. 427 Squadron RCAF
28	21 January 1944	23:04? (Note: According to Schumann claimed at 23:19.)	Vickers Wellington	Magdeburg	6./NJG 3	
– Messerschmitt Bf 110 G-4 D5+HL –
29	15 February 1944	20:40? (Note: According to Schumann claimed at 19:58.)	Four-engined bomber	south of Wismar northeast of Lüneburg	3./NJG 3	
30♠	20 February 1944	02:38? (Note: According to Schumann claimed over an Avro Lancaster at 01:53.)	Handley Page Halifax?	northwest of Delmenhorst	3./NJG 3	
31♠	20 February 1944	02:50? (Note: According to Schumann claimed over an Avro Lancaster at 02:21.)	Four-engined bomber?	south of Bremen	3./NJG 3	
32♠	20 February 1944	03:04? (Note: According to Schumann claimed at 02:48.)	Avro Lancaster	east of Celle	3./NJG 3	Lancaster JB745/PM-I No. 103 Squadron RAF
33♠	20 February 1944	04:33	Avro Lancaster	west of Vechta	3./NJG 3	Lancaster DV267/SR-K No. 101 Squadron RAF
34♠	20 February 1944	05:22? (Note: According to Schumann at 05:04.)	Avro Lancaster	north of Meppen	3./NJG 3	Halifax LW367/EY-L No. 78 Squadron RAF
– Messerschmitt Bf 110 G-4 D5+BL –
35	22 March 1944	21:18? (Note: According to Schumann claimed over an Avro Lancaster at 21:38.)	Four-engined bomber?	north of Osnabrück; PQ GR-2	3./NJG 3	
36	22 March 1944	21:40? (Note: According to Schumann claimed over a Handley Page Halifax at 21:54.)	Four-engined bomber?	west of Gütersloh	3./NJG 3	
– Messerschmitt Bf 110 G-4 D5+CL –
37	25 March 1944	00:19? (Note: According to Schumann claimed over an Avro Lancaster at 00:22.)	Four-engined bomber?	northwest of Essen in Oldenburg south of Meppen	3./NJG 3	
38	25 March 1944	00:24? (Note: According to Schumann claimed over an Avro Lancaster at 00:39.)	Four-engined bomber?	north of Quakenbrück; 15 km (9.3 mi) from Meppen	3./NJG 3	
39	25 March 1944	00:42? (Note: According to Schumann claimed at 01:04.)	Four-engined bomber	south of Papenburg; 10 km (6.2 mi) north of Almelo	3./NJG 3	
40	31 March 1944	00:24? (Note: According to Schumann claimed over an Avro Lancaster at 00:01.)	Four-engined bomber?	west of Vogelsberg; Alsfeld	3./NJG 3	
41	31 March 1944	00:35? (Note: According to Schumann claimed over an Avro Lancaster at 00:18.)	Four-engined bomber?	north of Fulda; Vogelsberg	3./NJG 3	
42	31 March 1944	00:54? (Note: According to Schumann claimed over a Handley Page Halifax at 00:57.)	Four-engined bomber?	Rhön	3./NJG 3	
– Messerschmitt Bf 110 G-4 D5+PL –
43	23 April 1944	01:55? (Note: According to Schumann claimed over a Handley Page Halifax III at 02:11.)	Avro Lancaster?	north of Geldern; 10–30 km (6.2–18.6 mi) northwest of Venlo	3./NJG 3	Lancaster MZ578/MP-I No. 76 Squadron RAF
– Messerschmitt Bf 110 G-4 D5+CL –
44	23 April 1944	23:22? (Note: According to Schumann claimed over a Handley Page Halifax III at 23:30.)	Four-engined bomber?	Isle Lolland	3./NJG 3	
45	27 April 1944	01:55? (Note: According to Schumann claimed over an Avro Lancaster III at 01:58.)	Handley Page Halifax?	east of Eindhoven; PQ LM	3./NJG 3	

=== Awards and decorations ===
- Aviator badge
- Iron Cross (1939)
  - 2nd Class (4 July 1941)
  - 1st Class (15 April 1942)
- Honour Goblet of the Luftwaffe on 9 August 1943 as Unteroffizier and pilot
- Front Flying Clasp of the Luftwaffe
  - in Silver (18 June 1942)
  - in Gold (14 January 1944)
- German Cross in Gold on 17 October 1943 as Unteroffizier in the 2./Nachtjagdgeschwader 3
- Knight's Cross of the Iron Cross with Oak Leaves
  - Knight's Cross on 6 April 1944 as Feldwebel and pilot in the 2./Nachtjagdgeschwader 3
  - 531st Oak Leaves on 20 July 1944 as Oberfeldwebel and pilot in the 2./Nachtjagdgeschwader 3
