= Schierholz =

Schierholz or Schierholtz is the surname of the following people:

- Christian Gottfried Schierholz (1787–1851), German businessperson and a Lord of the manor
- Friedrich Schierholz (1840–1894), German artist and sculptor
- Hans-Georg Schierholz (1921–1996), German soldier during World War II
- Henning Schierholz (1949–2007), German politician from the Political Party Alliance '90/The Greens
- Nate Schierholtz (1984), American baseball player
