= Norbert Schücking =

German WWII flying ace (born 1921)

- Born: 15 January 1921 (age 105); Waldviertel, Austria
- Military career
- Allegiance: Nazi Germany
- Branch: Luftwaffe
- Service years: 1943–1945
- Rank: Fahnenjunker-Feldwebel
- Unit: 1/JG 11
- Known for: Being one of the last Luftwaffe Aces
- Conflicts: Second World War; Defence of the Reich; Operation Bodenplatte
- Awards: German Cross in Gold, Iron Cross 1st and 2nd Class, Fighter Operational Clasp

Fahnenjunker-Feldwebel Norbert Schücking (born 15 January 1921) is the last living Luftwaffe ace of World War II. During the war Schücking claimed either 9 or 13 aerial victories on the Western Front.

== Life ==
Schücking (also spelt Schueking) was born in Waldviertel, an area of Lower Austria, on 15 January 1921. His family lived in a disused water mill. He went to school in Vienna, Budapest and a boarding school in the Harz Mountains; after completing his final exams (Abitur) in secondary school, he went straight into military service.

== Service in the Luftwaffe ==
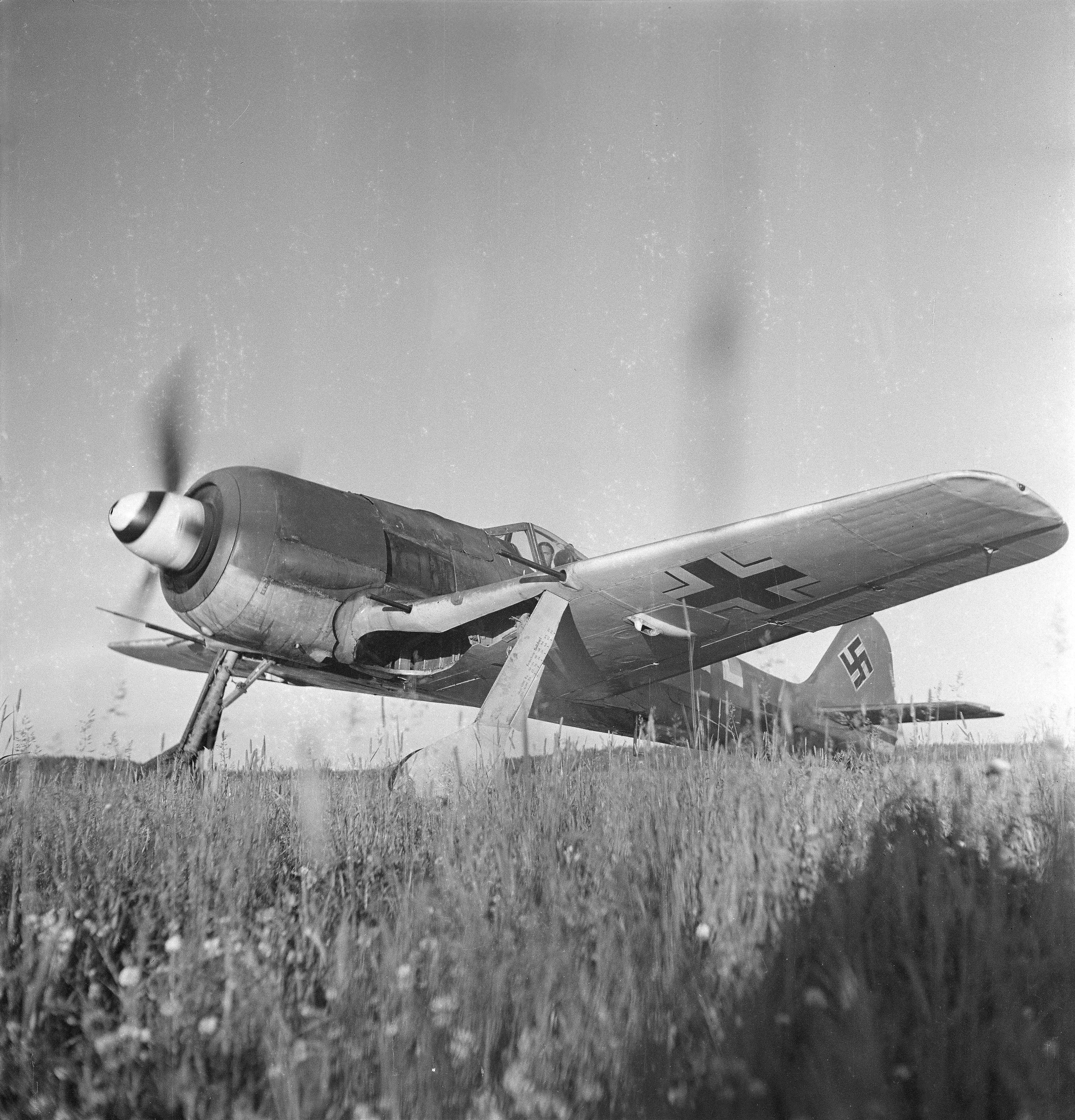
Focke Wulf 190A, a plane which Schücking flew

Schücking served as a Fahnenjunker-Feldwebel in the 1st Unit of JG11 during the war on the Western front. He flew a BF-109G and an FW-190A. Schücking joined the unit in late 1943 or early 1944 and achieved his first aerial victory on 20 February 1944 over Weimar against a B-17 Bomber. A majority of his aerial victories were against bombers (B-17s and B-24s), except for his tenth victory against a P-47 north of Alençon on the 27th June 1944, his eleventh victory against a Spitfire at Balleroy on the 14th July 1944, his twelfth victory on the 17th July 1944 against another P-47 near St Lô-Coutances, and his thirteenth and final aerial victory on the same day south-west of St Lô-Coutances against a P-51 Mustang. On 22 February 1945, Schücking bailed from his FW-190A at 100 m (330 ft), surviving by landing in snow. Schüking received the German Cross in Gold, both the Iron Cross 1st and 2nd Class, and the Fighter Operational clasp.

After the war, he met and married his wife Gunda and moved to Elmshorn, where he took up a commercial apprenticeship, and worked in the building materials industry for 40 years. Schücking had an interest in hunting and although he no longer hunts, he is noted as still enjoying nature and walks. He is the oldest resident of Elmshorn.
