= Hans-Georg Schierholz =

- Born: 16 August 1921; Lage, Prussia
- Died: 12 February 1996 (aged 74); Lippstadt, Germany
- Military career
- Allegiance: Nazi Germany
- Branch: Luftwaffe
- Service years: 1939–45
- Rank: Oberfeldwebel
- Unit: NJG 3
- Conflicts: World War II: Defence of the Reich
- Awards: Knight's Cross of the Iron Cross

Hans-Georg Schierholz (16 August 1921 – 12 February 1996) was a Bordfunker (radio/radar operator) and Oberfeldwebel in the Luftwaffe night fighter force during World War II. He was awarded the Knight's Cross of the Iron Cross (German: Ritterkreuz des Eisernen Kreuzes).

He flew on 212 combat missions, assisted in 57 aerial victories, and bailed out four times. He served in the crews of Oberfeldwebel Rudolf Frank and Major Werner Husemann.

== Awards and decorations ==
- Fliegerschützenabzeichen
- Front Flying Clasp of the Luftwaffe in Gold
  - in Bronze (13 August 1941)
  - in Silver (6 July 1942)
  - in Gold (28 August 1943)
- Iron Cross (1939)
  - 2nd Class (4 July 1941)
  - 1st Class (1 May 1942)
- German Cross in Gold on 20 March 1944 as Unteroffizier in the 6./Nachtjagdgeschwader 3
- Ehrenpokal der Luftwaffe on 17 April 1944 as Unteroffizier and radio operator
- Knight's Cross of the Iron Cross on 29 October 1944 as Oberfeldwebel and Bordfunker (radio/wireless operator) in the I./Nachtjagdgeschwader 3
