= List of aerial victories claimed by Günther Rall =

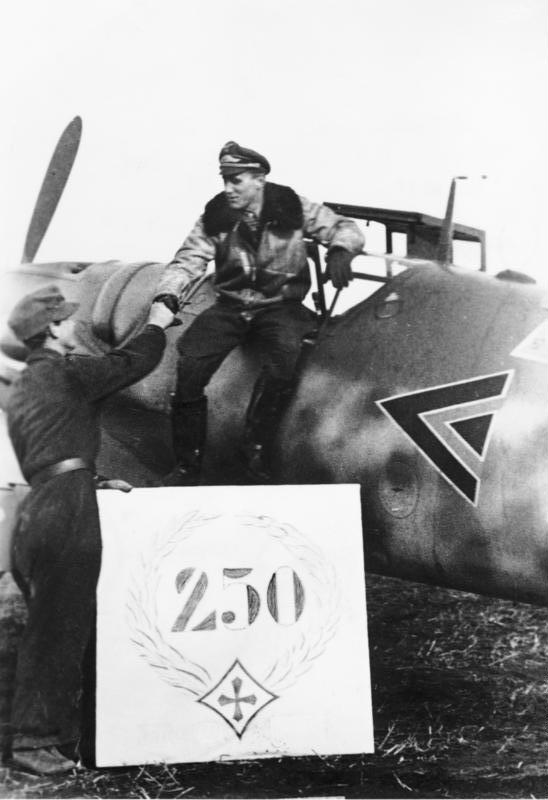
28 November 1943, Rall after his 250th aerial victory

Günther Rall (10 March 1918 – 4 October 2009) was a highly decorated German military aviator, officer and General, whose military career spanned nearly forty years. Rall was the third most successful fighter pilot in aviation history, behind Gerhard Barkhorn, who is second, and Erich Hartmann, who is first.

== List of aerial victories claimed ==
According to US historian David T. Zabecki, Rall was credited with 275 aerial victories. Spick also lists Rall with 275 aerial victories claimed in 621 combat missions and a mission-to-claim ratio of 2.26. Of these, three were claimed over the Western Allies and the remaining 272 on the Eastern Front. Mathews and Foreman, authors of Luftwaffe Aces — Biographies and Victory Claims, researched the German Federal Archives and found records for 274 aerial victory claims, plus one further unconfirmed claim. This number includes one victory over a French Curtiss P-36 Hawk, one victory over a U.S. Lockheed P-38 Lightning, and 272 Soviet-piloted aircraft on the Eastern Front.

Victory claims were logged to a map-reference (PQ = Planquadrat), for example "PQ 44621". The Luftwaffe grid map (Jägermeldenetz) covered all of Europe, western Russia and North Africa and was composed of rectangles measuring 15 minutes of latitude by 30 minutes of longitude, an area of about 360 square miles (930 km^{2}). These sectors were then subdivided into 36 smaller units to give a location area 3 km × 4 km (1.9 mi × 2.5 mi) in size.

♠ (Ace of spades) aerial victories which made Rall an "ace-in-a-day", a term which designates a fighter pilot who has shot down five or more airplanes in a single day.
– (dash) unconfirmed aerial victory claims for which Rall did not receive credit.
? (question mark) information discrepancies listed by Mombeek, Prien, Stemmer, Rodeike, Bock, Mathews and Foreman.
! (exclamation mark) according to Mathews and Foreman the aircraft was claimed as a Lavochkin La-5.

Claim	Date	Time	Type	Location	Claim	Date	Time	Type	Location
– 8. Staffel of Jagdgeschwader 52 –
1	18 May 1940	18:40	Hawk 75	south of Metz	74	10 September 1942	16:35	LaGG-3	PQ 44621, south of Mozdok
2	24 June 1941	07:25	DB-3	east of Constanța	75	10 September 1942	16:42	LaGG-3	PQ 54514, northwest of Grozny south of Mozdok
3	25 June 1941	17:40	SB-2	southeast of Constanța	76	12 September 1942	13:07	LaGG-3	PQ 44171, south of Mozdok
4	26 June 1941	05:10	DB-3	northeast of Constanța	77	17 September 1942	10:22	LaGG-3	PQ 54371, southwest of Mekenskaja near Kalinowskaja
5	4 August 1941	05:47	I-16	Kyiv	78	21 September 1942	16:22	MiG-3	PQ 44552, south of Samakul
6	4 August 1941	05:53	I-16	Kyiv	79	22 September 1942	08:34	Il-2	PQ 44552, south of Samakul
7	4 August 1941	06:10	I-16	Kyiv	80	22 September 1942	08:36	Il-2	PQ 44542, southwest of Daiskoje
8	6 August 1941	10:05	I-16	southeast of Kyiv	81	25 September 1942	15:39	LaGG-3	PQ 54531, south of Mekenskaja
9	9 August 1941	05:35	SB-2	southeast of Kyiv	82	28 September 1942	16:02	LaGG-3	PQ 4452 south of Werchnij-Kurp
10	11 August 1941	14:28	MiG-3	east of Kaniv	83	28 September 1942	16:07	LaGG-3	PQ 44533, south of Nishny Kurp
11	13 August 1941	10:52	I-16	northwest of Kaniv	84	29 September 1942	09:28	Il-2	PQ 44611, southeast of Nishny Kurp
12	14 August 1941	10:39	I-16	northwest of Kaniv	85	29 September 1942	09:31	LaGG-3	PQ 44614, south of Sagopschin
13	17 August 1941	13:32	I-15	east of Kaniv	86	29 September 1942	16:02	Il-2	PQ 44533, west of Werchnij-Kurp west of Nizhny Kurp
14	30 August 1941	15:15	DB-3	east of Dnepropetrovsk	87	29 September 1942	16:04	LaGG-3	PQ 44621, east of Werchnij-Kurp east of Nizhny Kurp
15	6 September 1941	12:57	R-10 (Seversky)	north of Dereivka	88	30 September 1942	16:02	Il-2	PQ 44473, south of Malgobek
16	17 September 1941	10:53	MiG-3	southeast of Kyiv	89	30 September 1942	16:03	LaGG-3	PQ 44621, south of Malgobek
17	25 September 1941	07:40	I-26 (Yak-1)	west of Kharkiv	90	30 September 1942	16:05	LaGG-3	southeast of Werchne Atschakuli
18	2 October 1941	12:17	V-11 (Il-2)	northeast of Poltava	91	5 October 1942	12:17	La-5	PQ 44672, east of Elchotowo
19	4 October 1941	12:35	R-10 (Seversky)	southwest of Valky	92	10 October 1942	12:58	LaGG-3	PQ 54672, west of Grozny west of Bolkhov
20	4 October 1941	12:37	R-10 (Seversky)	southeast of Valky	93	10 October 1942	13:04	LaGG-3	PQ 54642, northwest of Grozny west of Bolkhov
21	5 October 1941	12:44	R-10 (Seversky)	east of Sudrenkow	94	15 October 1942	13:06	LaGG-3	PQ 54374, south of Mundar-Jut
22	5 October 1941	16:32	R-10 (Seversky)	west of Mertschik	95	18 October 1942	13:20	La-5	PQ 54511, southeast of Mozdok
23	14 October 1941	15:45	Il-2	north of Poltava	96	19 October 1942	13:01	I-16	PQ 44581, west of Elchotowo
24	15 October 1941	07:37	I-26 (Yak-1)	east of Bohodukhiv	97	19 October 1942	13:03	I-16	PQ 44721, south of Elchotowo
25	17 October 1941	07:25	I-26 (Yak-1)	south of Kolomak	98	22 October 1942	14:32	LaGG-3	PQ 44331, east of Werchnij-Kurp
26	23 October 1941	13:32	I-61 (MiG-3)	south of Aleksandrovka	99	22 October 1942	14:33	LaGG-3	PQ 44363, north of Nishny Kurp
27	24 October 1941	12:45	I-15	northeast of Cape Takyl	100	22 October 1942	14:36	LaGG-3	west of Werchne Atschakuli
28	24 October 1941	16:17	I-16	southwest of Cape Takyl	101	30 October 1942	10:36	MiG-1	SSalugarden
29	31 October 1941	11:25	I-153	northwest of Alma-Tak	102	21 March 1943	07:30	LaGG-3	PQ 34 Ost 86512, north of Slavyansk-na-Kubani northeast of Petrovskaya
30	8 November 1941	11:44	MiG-3	southeast of Azov	103	21 March 1943	07:43	LaGG-3	PQ 34 Ost 86514, north of Slavyansk-na-Kubani west of Staro-Dsherilijcwskaja
31	9 November 1941	13:52	I-16	southeast of Djakowi	104	24 March 1943	11:42	LaGG-3	PQ 34 Ost 76682, northwest of Anastasiewskaja west of Petrovskaya
32	22 November 1941	13:49	I-61 (MiG-3)	southeast of Agrafenowka	105	24 March 1943	11:43	LaGG-3	PQ 34 Ost 76682, northwest of Anastasiewskaja near Slavyansk-Na
33	23 November 1941	13:35	Il-2	southeast of Rostov	106	26 March 1943	11:22	LaGG-3	PQ 34 Ost 85174, southeast of Krymsk west of Eriwanskaja
34	27 November 1941	14:06	Yak-1	northeast of Agrafenowka	107	26 March 1943	11:24	LaGG-3	PQ 34 Ost 85321, southeast of Krymsk near Eriwanskaja
35	28 November 1941	10:27	MiG-3	northwest of Rostov	108	27 March 1943	14:31	P-39	PQ 34 Ost 76833, south of Anastasiewskaja near Anactasiwskaja
36	28 November 1941	15:05	I-16	north of Rostov	109	9 April 1943	08:27!	LaGG-3	PQ 34 Ost 86161, northwest of Kholmskaya near Nowcrijkij
37	2 August 1942	09:35	I-153	PQ 17991, south of Salsk	110	10 April 1943	08:33	P-39	PQ 34 Ost 85132, northwest of Kholmskaya southeast of Derbcntskaja
38	2 August 1942	13:10	MiG-1	PQ 07884, south of Gorkaja Balka	111	12 April 1943	08:34	LaGG-3!	PQ 34 Ost 86673, east of Slawjanskaya west of Andrcjcwskaja
39	3 August 1942	16:17	MiG-1	PQ 16774, west of Armawir	112	12 April 1943	08:43	LaGG-3!	PQ 34 Ost 86673, Slawjanskaya east of Iwanowskaja
40	4 August 1942	17:47	LaGG-3	PQ 15112, southwest of Armawir	113	18 April 1943	06:49	LaGG-3!	PQ 34 Ost 85371, southeast of Gelendzhik; Sea south of Anapa
41	6 August 1942	09:45	Il-2	PQ 05222, southwest of Armawir	114	18 April 1943	06:58	LaGG-3!	PQ 34 Ost 85377, east of Kabardinka west of Zerkowny
42	6 August 1942	09:49	Il-2	PQ 05253, southwest of Armawir	115	18 April 1943	15:43	LaGG-3!	PQ 34 Ost 85193, southwest of Kholmskaya near Geiendzhik
43	6 August 1942	18:06	LaGG-3	PQ 06813, north of Kurganinsk	116	20 April 1943	06:49	LaGG-3!	PQ 34 Ost 85351, northeast of Gelendzhik east of Tschcshskij
44	6 August 1942	18:09	LaGG-3	PQ 06644, north of Kurganinsk	117	21 April 1943	06:54	LaGG-3!	PQ 34 Ost 75372, east of Gelendzhik; Black Sea 5 km (3.1 mi) south of Kabardinka
45	8 August 1942	07:36	LaGG-3	PQ 05194, southwest of Kurganinsk	118	21 April 1943	07:01	LaGG-3!	PQ 34 Ost 75414, east of Gelendzhik near Gelendzhik
46	10 August 1942	06:09	LaGG-3	PQ 05232, south of Krasnodor east of Stawropoliskaja	119	23 April 1943	07:32	LaGG-3!	PQ 34 Ost 75492, west of Gelendzhik; Black Sea 10 km (6.2 mi) west of Gelendzhik
47	13 August 1942	16:11	LaGG-3	PQ 34132, southeast of Pjatigorsk	120	27 April 1943	14:15	LaGG-3	PQ 34 Ost 76713, southeast of Krymsk
48	13 August 1942	18:17	Boston	PQ 35741, south of Mineralnyie Wody	121	28 April 1943	12:15	Spitfire	PQ 34 Ost 75231, northwest of Krymsk
49	14 August 1942	09:52	Boston	north of Karagatsch	122	28 April 1943	12:25	La-5	PQ 34 Ost 85113, east of Krymsk
50	15 August 1942	10:23	I-16	PQ 34464, north of Kachun	123	29 April 1943	07:59	Spitfire	PQ 34 Ost 85151, north of Abinsk; 10 km (6.2 mi) north of Novotcerkassk
51	16 August 1942	10:04	LaGG-3	PQ 34134, north of Kuba	124	29 April 1943	13:28	LaGG-3	PQ 34 Ost 85121, northeast of Mertschanskaja near Abinsk
52	16 August 1942	10:07	LaGG-3	PQ 34134, north of Kuba	125	30 April 1943	08:35	LaGG-3	PQ 34 Ost 85142, southeast of Krymsk near Beregowoj
53	17 August 1942	07:23	I-153	PQ 34433, west of Altud	126	30 April 1943	08:40	LaGG-3	PQ 34 Ost 85114, east of Krymsk southeast of Eriwanskaja
54	18 August 1942	13:17	LaGG-3	PQ 34663, southeast of Naltschik	127♠	3 May 1943	07:58	P-39	PQ 34 Ost 85144, west of Abinsk
55	18 August 1942	13:19	LaGG-3	PQ 34664, southeast of Naltschik	128♠	3 May 1943	08:15	LaGG-3!	PQ 34 Ost 85151, north of Abinsk
56	19 August 1942	08:17	LaGG-3	PQ 44321, east of Argudan	129♠	3 May 1943	08:26	LaGG-3!	PQ 34 Ost 85172, southwest of Abinsk
57	23 August 1942	10:36	LaGG-3	PQ 44443, north of Georgjewsk	130♠	3 May 1943	15:58	LaGG-3!	PQ 34 Ost 85153, east of Abinsk
58	23 August 1942	15:09	LaGG-3	PQ 54162, east of Gonschtak near Duminischi	131♠	3 May 1943	16:10	LaGG-3!	PQ 34 Ost 85144, southwest of Abinsk
59	25 August 1942	16:37	LaGG-3	PQ 54142, east of Gonschtak near Duminischi	132	4 May 1943	12:40	Spitfire	PQ 34 Ost 85143, southeast of Krymsk
60	27 August 1942	12:47	MiG-1	PQ 44531, southeast of Mozdok	133	4 May 1943	12:50	P-39	PQ 34 Ost 85151, north of Abinsk
61	29 August 1942	16:22	LaGG-3	PQ 54661, northeast of Grozny west of Bolkhov	134	5 May 1943	10:09	LaGG-3!	PQ 34 Ost 85141, southeast of Krymsk
62	30 August 1942	17:07	LaGG-3	PQ 54342, east of Mozdok near Andrejevka	135	5 May 1943	12:09	P-39	PQ 34 Ost 85113, east of Krymsk
63	1 September 1942	09:35	LaGG-3	PQ 54533, south of Kalinowskaja	136	6 May 1943	08:29	LaGG-3!	PQ 34 Ost 75264, southwest of Krymsk
64	1 September 1942	15:02	LaGG-3	PQ 54511, southwest of Kalinowskaja near Jelenskiy	137	6 May 1943	08:43	B-25	PQ 34 Ost 75261, southwest of Krymsk north of Nowo-Bakanskaja
65	2 September 1942	15:50	LaGG-3	PQ 54611, southeast of Kalinowskaja west of Bolkhov	138	6 May 1943	14:48	LaGG-3!	PQ 34 Ost 75294, west of Krymsk east of Nowo-Bakanskaja
66	4 September 1942	13:50? (Note: According to Mathews and Foreman claimed at 13:49.)	MiG-1	PQ 44442, south of Mozdok	139	7 May 1943	13:18	LaGG-3!	PQ 34 Ost 75261, west of Krymsk north of Nowo-Bakanskaja
67	6 September 1942	09:55	LaGG-3	PQ 44621, south of Mozdok	140	8 May 1943	16:11	LaGG-3!	PQ 34 Ost 75261, southwest of Krymsk north of Nowo-Bakanskaja
68	6 September 1942	10:35	LaGG-3	PQ 44471, south of Mozdok	141	9 May 1943	06:50	LaGG-3!	PQ 34 Ost 75262, southwest of Krymsk
69	7 September 1942	08:42	LaGG-3	PQ 44452, south of Mozdok	142	11 May 1943	06:16	LaGG-3!	PQ 34 Ost 85144, west of Abinsk
70	7 September 1942	08:46	Pe-2	PQ 44454, south of Mozdok	143	11 May 1943	06:24	LaGG-3!	PQ 34 Ost 85153, east of Abinsk
71	8 September 1942	12:42	LaGG-3	PQ 44377, south of Mozdok	144	21 May 1943	07:34	LaGG-3!	PQ 34 Ost 75464, northeast of Gelendzhik; Black Sea 5 km (3.1 mi) south of Kabardinka
72	8 September 1942	12:45	Yak-7	PQ 44233, south of Mozdok	145	23 May 1943	05:52	LaGG-3!	PQ 34 Ost 85114, northwest of Abinsk near Mertschanskaja
73	9 September 1942	16:48	LaGG-3	PQ 44467, south of Mozdok					
– III. Gruppe of Jagdgeschwader 52 –
146	7 July 1943	11:46	LaGG-3!	PQ 35 Ost 62742, east of Pawlowka; 10 km (6.2 mi) west of Prokhorovka	210	9 October 1943	06:46	LaGG-3!	PQ 34 Ost 49123, northeast of Kischenki; 45 km (28 mi) southeast of Krementschug
147	7 July 1943	11:52	LaGG-3!	PQ 35 Ost 61131, north of Jilinskij; 15 km (9.3 mi) southwest of Oboyan	211	9 October 1943	06:51	LaGG-3!	PQ 34 Ost 49144, south of Kischenki; 60 km (37 mi) east-southeast of Krementschug
148	8 July 1943	07:51	LaGG-3!	PQ 35 Ost 62842, south of Wyshnaja; 10 km (6.2 mi) west of Prokhorovka	212	9 October 1943	06:59	LaGG-3!	PQ 34 Ost 39262, Soloschino; 55 km (34 mi) southeast of Krementschug
149	8 July 1943	13:46	LaGG-3!	PQ 35 Ost 62793, west of Kotschetowka; 10 km (6.2 mi) east of Prokhorovka	213	9 October 1943	13:41	LaGG-3!	PQ 34 Ost 58594, Michailowka; 20 km (12 mi) west of Bolschoj Tokmak
150	8 July 1943	14:16	LaGG-3!	PQ 35 Ost 61221, south of Prokhorovka; 15 km (9.3 mi) northwest of Prokhorovka	214♠	10 October 1943	07:25	LaGG-3!	PQ 34 Ost 58161, Zaporizhia; 20 km (12 mi) east of Zaporizhia
151	8 July 1943	18:35	LaGG-3!	PQ 35 Ost 61132, south of Kotschetowka; 20 km (12 mi) north of Prokhorovka	215♠	10 October 1943	07:33	LaGG-3!	PQ 34 Ost 58272, Nowo-Iwankowka; 25 km (16 mi) east-northeast of Zaporizhia
152	9 July 1943	07:12	LaGG-3!	PQ 35 Ost 62872, northwest of Prokhorovka; 15 km (9.3 mi) northwest of Prokhorovka	216♠	10 October 1943	08:00	LaGG-3!	PQ 34 Ost 58241, Krassnoarmejskoje; 25 km (16 mi) east of Zaporizhia
153	9 July 1943	15:33	LaGG-3!	PQ 35 Ost 62791, Orlowka; 10 km (6.2 mi) north of Prokhorovka	217♠	10 October 1943	15:05	LaGG-3!	PQ 34 Ost 58672, Bolschoj Tokmak; 10 km (6.2 mi) northwest of Bolschoj Tokmak
154	9 July 1943	15:43	LaGG-3!	PQ 35 Ost 62871, Wesselij; 10 km (6.2 mi) north of Prokhorovka	218♠	10 October 1943	15:18	LaGG-3!	PQ 34 Ost 58811, Slawgorod; 10 km (6.2 mi) southwest of Bolschoj Tokmak
155	11 July 1943	09:59	LaGG-3	PQ 35 Ost 62812, Rshewtschik; 20 km (12 mi) east of Oboyan	219	12 October 1943	07:16	Il-2	PQ 34 Ost 59783, north of Zaporizhia; 20 km (12 mi) north-northeast of Zaporizhia
156	11 July 1943	17:43	LaGG-3!	PQ 35 Ost 62843, Korytnoje; 20 km (12 mi) north of Prokhorovka	220	12 October 1943	10:23	Il-2	PQ 34 Ost 59784, north-northeast of Zaporizhia; 20 km (12 mi) north-northeast of Zaporizhia
157	12 July 1943	16:45	La-5	PQ 35 Ost 62762, east of Snowilow; 15 km (9.3 mi) southeast of Oboyan	221	12 October 1943	14:39	LaGG-3!	PQ 34 Ost 59794, northeast of Zaporizhia; 30 km (19 mi) northeast of Zaporizhia
158	14 July 1943	19:07	LaGG-3	PQ 35 Ost 64363, southwest of Michailowka	222	15 October 1943	07:36	LaGG-3!	PQ 34 Ost 58182, east of Zaporizhia northwest of Zaporizhia
159	15 July 1943	15:03	LaGG-3	PQ 35 Ost 64381, north of Bolkhov near Zmiyckka	223	15 October 1943	08:10	LaGG-3!	PQ 34 Ost 58144, northeast of Zaporizhia near Barbastedt
160	17 July 1943	19:08	LaGG-3	PQ 35 Ost 54613, west of Bolkhov	224	15 October 1943	08:20	LaGG-3!	PQ 34 Ost 58163, east of Zaporizhia; 5 km (3.1 mi) southeast of Zaporizhia
161	17 July 1943	19:16	LaGG-3	PQ 35 Ost 54531, east of Bolkhov northeast of Orel	225	20 October 1943	08:16	P-39	PQ 34 Ost 49312, Werchne Dnjepprowsk near Piatykhatky
162	28 July 1943	10:03	LaGG-3!	PQ 35 Ost 54562, southwest of Bolkhov	226	20 October 1943	14:57	LaGG-3!	PQ 34 Ost 39611, southwest of Schletoje near Borodajewke
163	28 July 1943	10:04	LaGG-3!	PQ 35 Ost 54564, southwest of Bolkhov	227	21 October 1943	07:21	LaGG-3!	PQ 34 Ost 39624, east of Piatykhatky; 10 km (6.2 mi) east of Piatykhatky
164	28 July 1943	10:05	LaGG-3!	PQ 35 Ost 54564, southwest of Bolkhov	228	21 October 1943	11:10	P-39	PQ 34 Ost 49343, southwest of Werchne Dnjepprowsk; 55 km (34 mi) east of Mironowka
165	28 July 1943	18:02	LaGG-3	PQ 35 Ost 54593, west of Mszensk east of Bolkhov	229	22 October 1943	09:55	LaGG-3!	PQ 34 Ost 39434, east of Lichowka; 40 km (25 mi) east-northeast of Mironowka
166	31 July 1943	11:09	LaGG-3	PQ 35 Ost 54623, south of Peschowa	230	22 October 1943	14:08	P-39	PQ 34 Ost 39343, southwest of Nikolajewka; 55 km (34 mi) east of Mironowka
167	31 July 1943	17:07	LaGG-3	PQ 35 Ost 54672, southwest of Bolkhov	231	22 October 1943	14:20	P-39	PQ 34 Ost 39372, east of Didenowka near Werchnedjeprowak
168	3 August 1943	14:57	LaGG-3	PQ 35 Ost 61192, northwest of Belgorod; 10 km (6.2 mi) east of Krasnyi Lyman	232	24 October 1943	08:10	LaGG-3!	PQ 34 Ost 58564, northeast of Michailowka near Wassilijewka
169	3 August 1943	18:22	LaGG-3	PQ 35 Ost 61363, west of Belgorod near Tomarovka	233	24 October 1943	08:20	LaGG-3!	PQ 34 Ost 58534, Gladkij near Kalinowka
170	4 August 1943	10:47	Il-2 m.H. (Note: The "m.H." refers to an Ilyushin Il-2 with rear gunner (mit Heckschütze).)	PQ 35 Ost 61352, southeast of Tomarovka; 15 km (9.3 mi) west of Tomarovka	234	24 October 1943	15:20	Il-2	PQ 34 Ost 58562, Ukrainowka near Kalinowka
171	5 August 1943	07:06	LaGG-3	PQ 35 Ost 61362, northwest of Belgorod; 10 km (6.2 mi) north of Tomarovka	235	25 October 1943	14:30	LaGG-3!	PQ 34 Ost 57154, west of Melitopol; 15 km (9.3 mi) west of Fedorowka
172	5 August 1943	11:15	LaGG-3	PQ 35 Ost 61331, northeast of Tomarovka	236	25 October 1943	14:33	LaGG-3!	PQ 34 Ost 57151, north of Nowo-Nikolajewka; 5 km (3.1 mi) northwest of Melitopol
173	5 August 1943	11:25	LaGG-3	PQ 35 Ost 61413, northwest of Belgorod near Schopino	237	25 October 1943	14:35	LaGG-3!	PQ 34 Ost 57114, northwest of Nowo-Nikolajewka; 10 km (6.2 mi) west of Melitopol
174	7 August 1943	10:16	LaGG-3!	PQ 35 Ost 61394, southwest of Belgorod; 10 km (6.2 mi) southwest of Belograd	238	26 October 1943	10:54	P-39	PQ 34 Ost 39642, west of Pjatichatki; 10 km (6.2 mi) south of Pjatichatki
175	7 August 1943	18:06	LaGG-3!	PQ 35 Ost 61523, southwest of Dolpino; 20 km (12 mi) southwest of Tomarovka	239	29 October 1943	10:50	P-39	PQ 34 Ost 39522, west of Selennoje; 15 km (9.3 mi) south of Stschastliwaja
176	7 August 1943	18:19	LaGG-3!	PQ 35 Ost 61533, south of Dolpino; 15 km (9.3 mi) southwest of Belograd	240	29 October 1943	14:51	P-39	PQ 34 Ost 39732, south of Annowka; Black Sea, 45 km (28 mi) southwest of Perekop
177	9 August 1943	16:14	La-5	PQ 35 Ost 61823, Ternowaja; 15 km (9.3 mi) southwest of Vovchansk	241	5 November 1943	14:51	Yak-1!	PQ 34 Ost 49711, south of Prokhorovka; 65 km (40 mi) east-northeast of Kriwoj-Rog
178	11 August 1943	18:37	LaGG-3!	PQ 35 Ost 61531, 25 km (16 mi) southwest of Belograd	242	6 November 1943	07:50	LaGG-3!	west of Werchne Rogatschik; 35 km (22 mi) south of Nikopol
179	12 August 1943	10:00	LaGG-3!	PQ 35 Ost 61514, northeast of Udy; 20 km (12 mi) north-northeast of Zolochev	243	6 November 1943	09:41	LaGG-3!	PQ 34 Ost 48761, Pawlowka; 40 km (25 mi) west-southwest of Beloserka
180	14 August 1943	10:23	LaGG-3!	PQ 35 Ost 60152, south of Udy west of Kotljary	244	15 November 1943	13:49	LaGG-3!	PQ 34 Ost 39731, west of Annowka; Black Sea, 45 km (28 mi) southwest of Perekop
181	15 August 1943	11:13	LaGG-3!	PQ 35 Ost 51821, northeast of Senoje north of Krasnokutsk	245	22 November 1943	08:42	LaGG-3!	PQ 34 Ost 58711, west of Michailowka; 10 km (6.2 mi) east of Beloserka
182	15 August 1943	11:21	LaGG-3!	PQ 35 Ost 51762, Bohodukhiv; 15 km (9.3 mi) southwest of Zolochev	246	22 November 1943	12:32	LaGG-3!	south-southeast of Krinitschkij south-southeast of Krimitschka
183	17 August 1943	07:17	LaGG-3!	PQ 35 Ost 70791, Tichocki; 20 km (12 mi) southeast of lzum	247	27 November 1943	08:37	LaGG-3!	Nowo-Nikolajewka
184	17 August 1943	10:55	LaGG-3!	PQ 35 Ost 70842, Korowin-Jar; 20 km (12 mi) northwest of Krasnyi Lyman	248	27 November 1943	09:03	LaGG-3!	northwest of Malaja-Beloserka
185	18 August 1943	08:22	LaGG-3!	PQ 35 Ost 51851, Klenowo; 20 km (12 mi) east of Bohodukhiv	249	27 November 1943	11:26	LaGG-3!	Pokrowka
186	19 August 1943	11:42	LaGG-3	PQ 34 Ost 88244, Artemowka20 km (12 mi) northeast of Kuteinykove	250	28 November 1943	08:27	LaGG-3!	south of Zaporizhia
187♠	20 August 1943	09:08	LaGG-3!	PQ 34 Ost 88254, Kalynivka; 25 km (16 mi) east-northeast of Kuteinykove	251	29 November 1943	08:46	LaGG-3!	south of Zaporizhia
188♠	20 August 1943	09:09	LaGG-3!	PQ 34 Ost 88252, Marinowka near Dmitrijewka	252	30 November 1943	10:17	LaGG-3!	southeast of Sofiivka
189♠	20 August 1943	15:59	P-39	PQ 34 Ost 88291, west of Kuybyshev; 1 km (0.62 mi) south of Jalisawehino	253	26 February 1944	12:41	Il-2 m.H.	PQ 19634; 25 km (16 mi) west-southwest of Kirovograd
190♠	20 August 1943	15:59	P-39	PQ 34 Ost 88291, west of Kuybyshev; 15 km (9.3 mi) east of Jalisawehino	254	26 February 1944	14:37	P-39	PQ 29522 near Alekandrovka
191♠	20 August 1943	16:37	LaGG-3!	PQ 34 Ost 88283, southwest of Kuybyshev; 15 km (9.3 mi) east of Jalisawehino	255	10 March 1944	11:45	La-5	PQ 80392; 30 km (19 mi) southwest of Kazatin
192	21 August 1943	07:45	Il-2	PQ 34 Ost 88293, southwest of Kuybyshev; 15 km (9.3 mi) east of Jalisawehino	256	12 March 1944	08:17	La-5	PQ 60631 near Balaklcya
193	24 August 1943	14:51	LaGG-3!	PQ 34 Ost 88193, Amwrosijewka; 10 km (6.2 mi) east of Kuteinykove	257	12 March 1944	08:19	La-5	PQ 60632 near Balaklcya
194	24 August 1943	14:54	LaGG-3!	PQ 34 Ost 88191, Nikolajewka; 10 km (6.2 mi) east of Kuteinykove	258	13 March 1944	08:40	La-5	PQ 70511 near Balaklcya
195	24 August 1943	15:12	LaGG-3!	PQ 34 Ost 88292, west of Kuybyshev; 5 km (3.1 mi) southeast of Jalisawehino	259	13 March 1944	08:42	La-5	PQ 70523; 10 km (6.2 mi) east of Balaklcya
196	25 August 1943	15:03	LaGG-3!	PQ 34 Ost 88412, west of Uspenskaja; 20 km (12 mi) southwest of Jalisawchino	260	13 March 1944	12:45	La-5	PQ 60631; 20 km (12 mi) east of Balaklcya
197	27 August 1943	10:40	P-39	PQ 34 Ost 88352, Pokorowo; 15 km (9.3 mi) west-southwest of Jalisawchino	261	15 March 1944	15:42	La-5	PQ 60484; 15 km (9.3 mi) northeast of Andrejewka
198	27 August 1943	15:09	P-39	PQ 34 Ost 88193, Amwrosijewskaja; 20 km (12 mi) south-southwest of Kuteinykove	262	15 March 1944	15:51	La-5	PQ 60634 near Balaklcya
199	29 August 1943	08:10	LaGG-3!	PQ 34 Ost 88462, southeast of Kuybyshev; 20 km (12 mi) south-southeast of Kuteinykove	263	17 March 1944	16:20	La-5	PQ 60612 near Andrejewka
200	29 August 1943	08:21	LaGG-3!	PQ 34 Ost 88364, west of Sinjewka; 25 km (16 mi) south-southeast of Jalisawehino	264	19 March 1944	08:57	La-5	PQ 60481; 15 km (9.3 mi) northeast of Andrejewka
201	1 October 1943	14:45	LaGG-3!	PQ 34 Ost 58791, northwest of Zaporizhia; 30 km (19 mi) northeast of Zaporizhia	265	19 March 1944	08:59	La-5	northwest of Proskuriv; 15 km (9.3 mi) northeast of Andrejewka
202	1 October 1943	14:51	LaGG-3!	PQ 34 Ost 58212, Nowo-Gupulowka; 30 km (19 mi) northeast of Zaporizhia	266	19 March 1944	15:17	La-5	PQ 60621; 15 km (9.3 mi) east of Andrejewka
203	2 October 1943	11:04	LaGG-3!	PQ 34 Ost 58132, Krassnoarmejskoje; 20 km (12 mi) northeast of Zaporizhia	267	19 March 1944	15:19	La-5	PQ 60661; 10 km (6.2 mi) south of Balaklcya
204	3 October 1943	10:44	LaGG-3!	PQ 34 Ost 58821, Bolschoj Tokmak near Bolschoj Tokmak	268	21 March 1944	15:14	La-5	PQ 60462; 15 km (9.3 mi) north of Balaklcya
205	4 October 1943	09:05	LaGG-3!	PQ 34 Ost 58162, east of Zaporizhia; 20 km (12 mi) northeast of Zaporizhia	269	29 March 1944	11:07	Pe-2	PQ 51723; 15 km (9.3 mi) northeast of Brody
206	4 October 1943	09:34	Il-2 m.H.	PQ 34 Ost 58134, east of Zaporizhia; 20 km (12 mi) east of Zaporizhia	270	15 April 1944	10:22	Yak-7	PQ 35423; 20 km (12 mi) northeast of Sevastopol
207	4 October 1943	14:19	LaGG-3!	PQ 34 Ost 58644, Bolschoj Tokmak; 15 km (9.3 mi) northwest of Bolschoj Tokmak	271	15 April 1944	10:26	Yak-7	northeast of Sevastopol; 20 km (12 mi) northeast of Sevastopol
208	7 October 1943	07:50	LaGG-3!	PQ 34 Ost 49322, west of Schulgowka; 45 km (28 mi) southeast of Krementschug	272	16 April 1944	16:10	La-5	PQ 35452; 20 km (12 mi) northeast of Sevastopol
209	7 October 1943	15:16	LaGG-3!	PQ 34 Ost 39263, northwest of Mishorin-Rog; 60 km (37 mi) west-northwest of Dnepropetrovsk	273	16 April 1944	16:20	La-5	PQ 35421; 15 km (9.3 mi) east of Sevastopol
– II. Gruppe of Jagdgeschwader 11 –
274	29 April 1944	11:15	P-38	PQ 05 Ost S/FU, north of Hanover	—	12 May 1944	12:20	P-47	Wetzlar
