= Werner Husemann =

- Born: 10 November 1919; Schötmar/Lippe, Germany
- Died: 2 February 2014 (aged 94); Bad Salzuflen, Germany
- Military career
- Allegiance: Nazi Germany
- Branch: Luftwaffe
- Service years: 1941–1945
- Rank: Major (Major)
- Units: NJG 1, NJG 3
- Commands: 7./NJG 1 I./NJG 3
- Conflicts: World War II: Defense of the Reich
- Awards: Knight's Cross of the Iron Cross

Werner Husemann (10 November 1919 – 2 February 2014) was a German Luftwaffe night fighter ace and recipient of the Knight's Cross of the Iron Cross, the highest award in the military and paramilitary forces of Nazi Germany during World War II. Husemann claimed to have shot down 34 enemy aircraft, and was credited with 30 aerial victories. (Note: For a list of Luftwaffe night fighter aces see List of German World War II night fighter aces.)

== Career ==
Husemann was born on 10 November 1919 in Schötmar then in the Free State of Lippe within the Weimar Republic. He enlisted in the Luftwaffe in 1941 and served with a weather reconnaissance squadron.

=== Night fighter career ===
A map of part of the Kammhuber Line. The 'belt' and night fighter 'boxes' are shown.

Following the 1939 aerial Battle of the Heligoland Bight, RAF attacks shifted to the cover of darkness, initiating the Defence of the Reich campaign. By mid-1940, Generalmajor (Brigadier General) Josef Kammhuber had established a night air defense system dubbed the Kammhuber Line. It consisted of a series of control sectors equipped with radars and searchlights and an associated night fighter. Each sector named a Himmelbett (canopy bed) would direct the night fighter into visual range with target bombers. In 1941, the Luftwaffe started equipping night fighters with airborne radar such as the Lichtenstein radar. This airborne radar did not come into general use until early 1942.

In late 1942, Husemann transferred to the Stab (staff) of Nachtjagdgeschwader 1 (the 1st Night Fighter Wing). He claimed his first aerial victorie on the night of 17/18 August 1942. His victories increased to 17 by the end of 1943, including three British Avro Lancaster bombers shot down on the night of 25/26 June 1943. He was appointed Staffelkapitän (squadron commander) of the 7th squadron of NJG 1 on 1 October 1943. Husemann was awarded the German Cross in Gold on 24 October 1943, and the Ehrenpokal der Luftwaffe on 1 November 1943.

=== Group commander ===
On 4 January 1944, Husemann became commander of the I. Gruppe of Nachtjagdgeschwader 3 (NJG 3—3rd Night Fighter Wing), succeeding Hauptmann Paul Szameitat who had been killed. Husemann was awarded the Knight's Cross of the Iron Cross (Ritterkreuz des Eisernen Kreuzes) on 30 September 1944 after being credited with 30 aerial victories. By the war's end he had 34 aerial victories in over 250 night combat missions. His last 13 victories were claimed with Oberfeldwebel Hans-Georg Schierholz as his wireless/radio operator.

On 14 November 1944, Husemann, flying a Junkers Ju 88 G6 attacked a Short Stirling bomber near Ringkøbing. During the attack, the Ju 88 was hit by the defensive fire of the Stirling's tail gunner. Too low to bail out, Husemann made a forced landing in the fields of Tværmosegaard, a farm 9 kilometres (5.6 miles) northeast of Herning.

== Summary of career ==
=== Aerial victory claims ===
According to Spick, Husemann was credited with 32 aerial victories claimed in over 250 combat missions. The authors Heaton and Lewis state that he was credited with 34 aerial victories. Obermaier lists him with 30 nocturnal aerial victories claimed in over 250 combat missions. Foreman, Parry and Mathews, authors of Luftwaffe Night Fighter Claims 1939 – 1945, researched the German Federal Archives and found records for 32 nocturnal victory claims Mathews and Foreman also published Luftwaffe Aces — Biographies and Victory Claims, listing Husemann with 31 claims.

In some instances, aerial victories were claimed and logged in a Planquadrat (PQ—grid reference). The Luftwaffe grid map (Jägermeldenetz) map was composed of rectangles measuring 15 minutes of latitude by 30 minutes of longitude, an area of about 360 square miles (930 km^{2}).

Chronicle of aerial victories
This and the ? (question mark) indicates information discrepancies listed in Luftwaffe Night Fighter Claims 1939 – 1945 but not in Luftwaffe Aces — Biographies and Victory Claims.
Claim	Date	Time	Type	Location	Serial No./Squadron No.
– Stab of Nachtjagdgeschwader 1 –
1	17 December 1942	20:53	Stirling	6 km (3.7 mi) northeast of Zwolle; PQ 4341	Stirling BF396/No. 75 Squadron RAF
2	27 April 1943	03:37	Stirling	17 km (11 mi) west of Hilversum	Stirling BF383/No. 90 Squadron RAF
3	12 June 1943	02:55	Wellington		
4	13 June 1943	02:20	Lancaster	Tubbergen	Lancaster ED816/No. 97 (Straits Settlements) Squadron RAF
5	24 June 1943	03:17	Halifax	6 km (3.7 mi) north-northwest of Amsterdam	Halifax BB379/No. 138 Squadron RAF
6	26 June 1943	01:13	Halifax	east of Zevenaar	Stirling BK768/No. 75 Squadron RAF
7? (Note: This claim is listed in Luftwaffe Night Fighter Claims 1939 – 1945 but not in Luftwaffe Aces — Biographies and Victory Claims.)	26 June 1943	01:17	Stirling	13 km (8.1 mi) west-northwest of Waterwijk	Stirling EH898/No. 218 (Gold Coast) Squadron RAF
8	26 June 1943	02:19	Lancaster	13 km (8.1 mi) south of Haarlem	Lancaster R5572/No. 106 Squadron RAF
9	29 June 1943	03:07	Lancaster	3 km (1.9 mi) north of Hoorn	Lancaster ED569/No. 207 Squadron RAF
10	24 August 1943	00:50	Halifax	Biesenthal	Lancaster ED328/No. 101 Squadron RAF
11	28 August 1943	03:15	Wellington	northwest of Nuremberg	Stirling EF448/No. 218 (Gold Coast) Squadron RAF
12	4 September 1943	00:50	Wellington	vicinity of Strasbourg	
13	7 September 1943	00:45	Halifax	30 km (19 mi) south of Munich	Halifax JD166/No. 10 Squadron RAF
– 7. Staffel of Nachtjagdgeschwader 1 –
14	22 October 1943	21:30	Lancaster	20 km (12 mi) northwest of Minden	Lancaster DS778/408 (Goose) Squadron
– Stab I. Gruppe of Nachtjagdgeschwader 3 –
15	25 March 1944	00:39	four-engined bomber	west of Münster	
16	10 April 1944	03:40? (Note: According to Luftwaffe Aces — Biographies and Victory Claims at 03:45.)	four-engined bomber	Hersfeld	
17	10 April 1944	03:45? (Note: According to Luftwaffe Aces — Biographies and Victory Claims at 03:50.)	four-engined bomber	vicinity of Hersfeld	
18	23 April 1944	23:56	four-engined bomber	Lolland Island	
19	23 May 1944	00:25	four-engined bomber	Assen/Emmen	Lancaster ND963/No. 83 Squadron RAF
20	16 June 1944	00:59	four-engined bomber	south of Thérouanne	
21	24 June 1944	01:15	four-engined bomber	Saint-Omer/Ypres	
22	6 July 1944	00:35	four-engined bomber	Strait of Dover	
23	21 July 1944	01:34	four-engined bomber	northwest of Venlo	Lancaster ND915/No. 75 Squadron RAF
24	29 July 1944	01:47	four-engined bomber	Bitsche/Pirmasens	Lancaster KB759/No. 428 Squadron RCAF
25	13 August 1944	00:47	four-engined bomber	Sulingen/Wagenfeld	Lancaster LM598/No. 101 Squadron RAF
26	17 August 1944	00:40	four-engined bomber	330° – 350° from beacon "Q"	Lancaster PB239/No. 405 Squadron RCAF
27	30 August 1944	00:48	Lancaster	PQ LH	Lancaster ED588/No. 50 Squadron RAF
28	30 August 1944	01:19	Lancaster	PQ OK-PK	Lancaster HK594/No. 75 Squadron RAF
29	14 February 1945	20:41	Halifax	Zealand Island	Halifax MY793/No. 10 Squadron
30	14 February 1945	21:17	Halifax	Møn Island	
31	4 March 1945	20:29	Lancaster	east of Aahus	
32	4 March 1945	23:32	Lancaster	Bourtange moor	

=== Awards ===
- Iron Cross (1939) 2nd and 1st Class
- Honour Goblet of the Luftwaffe (Ehrenpokal der Luftwaffe) on 1 November 1943 as Oberleutnant and pilot
- German Cross in Gold on 24 October 1943 as Oberleutnant in the 7./Nachtjagdgeschwader 1
- Knight's Cross of the Iron Cross on 30 September 1944 as Major and Gruppenkommandeur of I./Nachtjagdgeschwader 3

== Notes ==
Military offices
Preceded by Hauptmann Paul Szameitat	Gruppenkommandeur of I. Nachtjagdgeschwader 3; 4 January 1944 – 8 May 1945	Succeeded by disbanded
