= Paul Szameitat =

German World War II fighter pilot

- Born: 19 December 1919; Wolittnick, East Prussia
- Died: 2 January 1944 (aged 24); Bückeburg
- Military career
- Allegiance: Nazi Germany
- Branch: Luftwaffe
- Service years: ?–1944
- Rank: Hauptmann
- Unit: NJG 3
- Commands: II./NJG 3 I./NJG 3
- Conflicts: World War II: Defense of the Reich
- Awards: Knight's Cross of the Iron Cross

Paul Szameitat (19 December 1919 – 2 January 1944) was a German Luftwaffe night fighter ace and recipient of the Knight's Cross of the Iron Cross during World War II. The Knight's Cross of the Iron Cross, and its variants were the highest awards in the military and paramilitary forces of Nazi Germany during World War II. Szameitat claimed 29 victories, 28 at night. (Note: For a list of Luftwaffe night fighter aces see List of German World War II night fighter aces.)

== Night fighter career ==
A map of part of the Kammhuber Line. The 'belt' and night fighter 'boxes' are shown.

Following the 1939 aerial Battle of the Heligoland Bight, RAF attacks shifted to the cover of darkness, initiating the Defence of the Reich campaign. By mid-1940, Generalmajor (Brigadier General) Josef Kammhuber had established a night air defense system dubbed the Kammhuber Line. It consisted of a series of control sectors equipped with radars and searchlights and an associated night fighter. Each sector named a Himmelbett (canopy bed) would direct the night fighter into visual range with target bombers. In 1941, the Luftwaffe started equipping night fighters with airborne radar such as the Lichtenstein radar. This airborne radar did not come into general use until early 1942.

On 18 October 1943, Szameitat was shot down in his Dornier Do 217 N-1 night fighter by the defensive gunfire of an Avro Lancaster bomber from No. 101 Squadron. Hit in both engines, he and his crew bailed out near Barsinghausen.

On 14 December 1943, Szameitat was appointed Gruppenkommandeur (group commander) of I. Gruppe (1st group) of Nachtjagdgeschwader 3 (NJG 3—3rd Night Fighter Wing), replacing Hauptmann Walter Mylius.

== Summary of career ==
=== Aerial victory claims ===
According to Spick, Szameitat was credited with 29 aerial victories, including one heavy bomber during a daytime mission, claimed in an unknown number combat missions. Obermaier also lists him with 29 aerial victories claimed in an unknown number combat missions. Foreman, Parry and Mathews, authors of Luftwaffe Night Fighter Claims 1939 – 1945, researched the German Federal Archives and found records for 29 victory claims. Mathews and Foreman also published Luftwaffe Aces — Biographies and Victory Claims, listing Szameitat with 25 claims, plus two further unconfirmed claims.

Chronicle of aerial victories
This and the ? (question mark) indicates information discrepancies listed by Luftwaffe Night Fighter Claims 1939 – 1945 and Luftwaffe Aces — Biographies and Victory Claims.
Claim	Date	Time	Type	Location	Serial No./Squadron No.
– 6. Staffel of Nachtjagdgeschwader 3 –
1	26 February 1942	22:15	Wellington	Tønder	
2	29 April 1942	02:30	Wellington	north of Flensburg	
3? (Note: According to Luftwaffe Aces — Biographies and Victory Claims this claim is unconfirmed.)	30 April 1942	02:31	Manchester	east of Rantum	
4? (Note: This claim is not listed in Luftwaffe Aces — Biographies and Victory Claims.)	26 June 1942	02:11	Halifax	Cuxhaven	
5?	3 July 1942	02:53	Wellington		
6	17 January 1943	19:33	Stirling	70 km (43 mi) northwest of Westerland	
7	17 January 1943	21:49	Lancaster	90 km (56 mi) northwest of Westerland	
8	17 January 1943	22:18	Lancaster	25 km (16 mi) west of Fanø	
– 5. Staffel of Nachtjagdgeschwader 3 –
9	30 March 1943	00:36	Halifax	Süderschmedeby	Halifax HR654/408 (Goose) Squadron
10	5 April 1943	00:22	Lancaster	Hindenburgdamm	Halifax BB336/408 (Goose) Squadron
11	29 April 1943	03:51	Lancaster	northwest of Kolding	Lancaster ED733/No. 103 Squadron RAF
12	4 July 1943	01:28	Stirling	30 km (19 mi) northwest of Terschelling	Stirling BF579/No. 15 Squadron RAF
13	24 August 1943	02:03	Lancaster	10 km (6.2 mi) east of Kampen	
14	22 September 1943	23:02	Stirling	southwest of Hanover	
15	8 October 1943	16:17	B-24	south of Vilsen	
16	9 October 1943	01:25	Lancaster	southwest of Stade	
17	18 October 1943	20:30	Lancaster	10 km (6.2 mi) south of Hanover	Lancaster W4276/No. 207 Squadron RAF
18	18 October 1943	20:34	Lancaster	15 km (9.3 mi) south of Hanover	
19	2 December 1943	19:35	Lancaster	northeast of Hanover	
20	2 December 1943	19:45	Lancaster	30 km (19 mi) east of Celle	
21	2 December 1943	20:01	Lancaster	vicinity of Stendal	
22?{	4 December 1943	—	Lancaster		
23	4 December 1943	03:18	Lancaster	north of Hanover	
24	4 December 1943	03:25	Lancaster	Hamm-Wesendorf	
25	4 December 1943	03:36	Lancaster	north of Braunschweig	
26	4 December 1943	03:41	Lancaster	vicinity of Hanover	
– 2. Staffel of Nachtjagdgeschwader 3 –
27	20 December 1943	20:30	Halifax	south of Bonn	
28	24 December 1943	03:06	Lancaster	Lansenheim	
29	29 December 1943	21:23	Halifax	3 km (1.9 mi) west of Güstrow	

=== Awards ===
- Flugzeugführerabzeichen
- Front Flying Clasp of the Luftwaffe
- Iron Cross (1939) 2nd and 1st Class
- Honor Goblet of the Luftwaffe on 5 June 1943 as Oberleutnant and pilot
- German Cross in Gold on 12 December 1943 as Hauptmann in the 5./Nachtjagdgeschwader 3
- Knight's Cross of the Iron Cross on 6 April 1944 as Hauptmann and Gruppenkommandeur of the I./Nachtjagdgeschwader 3

== Notes ==
Military offices
Preceded by Major Heinrich Prinz zu Sayn-Wittgenstein	Gruppenkommandeur of II. Nachtjagdgeschwader 3 December 1943 – 14 December 1943	Succeeded by Major Klaus Havenstein
Preceded by Hauptmann Walter Mylius	Gruppenkommandeur of I. Nachtjagdgeschwader 3; 14 December 1943 – 2 January 1944	Succeeded by Major Werner Husemann
