= Nachtjagdgeschwader 3 =

- Active: 1941 – 1945
- Country: Nazi Germany
- Branch: Luftwaffe
- Type: Night Fighter
- Role: Air superiority
- Size: Air Force Wing
- Engagements: World War II

Insignia
- Identification symbol: Geschwaderkennung of L1 (inherited from LG 1), later D5

Nachtjagdgeschwader 3 (NJG 3) was a Luftwaffe night fighter-wing of World War II. NJG 3 was formed on 29 September 1941 in Stade from Stab./Zerstörergeschwader 26. Pilots of NJG 3 claimed approximately 820 aerial victories by day and night.

== Commanding officers ==
=== Geschwaderkommodore ===
- Major Johann Schalk, 29 March 1941 – 1 August 1943
- Oberst Helmut Lent, 1 August 1943 – 7 October 1944
- Oberst Günther Radusch, 12 November 1944 – 8 May 1945

=== Gruppenkommandeur ===
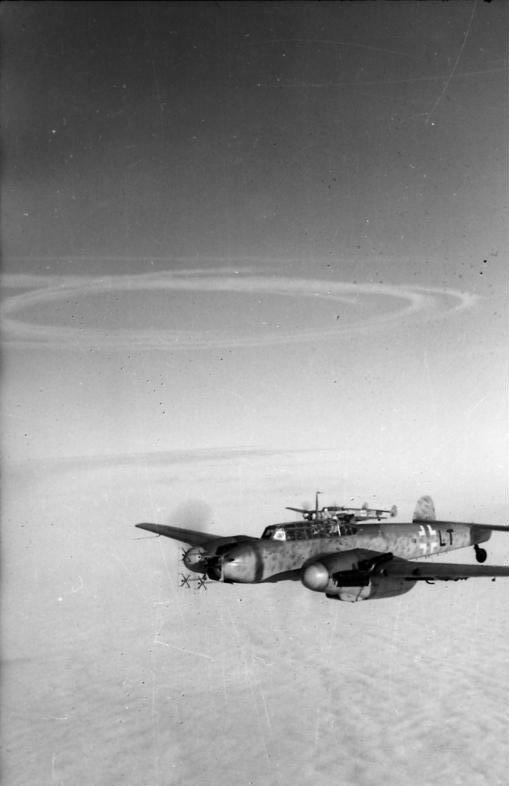
Messerschmitt Bf 110 G-4 from 9./NJG 3

==== I. Gruppe ====
- Hauptmann Günther Radusch, 7 October 1940 – 2 October 1941
- Hauptmann Hans-Dietrich Knoetzsch, 3 October 1941 – 30 September 1942
- Major Egmont Prinz zur Lippe-Weißenfeld, 1 October 1942 – 31 May 1943
- Hauptmann Erhard Peters, 1 June 1943 – 14 August 1943
- Hauptmann Walter Mylius, 15 August 1943 – 13 December 1943
- Hauptmann Paul Szameitat, 14 December 1943 – 2 January 1944
- Major Werner Husemann, 4 January 1944 – 8 May 1945

==== II. Gruppe ====
- Hauptmann Günther Radusch, 3 October 1941 – 1 August 1943
- Major Heinrich Prinz zu Sayn-Wittgenstein, 15 August 1943 – November 1943
- Hauptmann Paul Szameitat, December 1943 – 14 December 1943
- Major Klaus Havenstein, 15 December 1943 – September 1944
- Hauptmann Hüschens, September 1944 – February 1945

==== III. Gruppe ====
- Oberstleutnant Heinz Nacke, 1 November 1941 – 21 April 1943
- Hauptmann Walter Mylius, 22 April 1943 – 14 August 1943
- Hauptmann Rudolf Sigmund, 15 August 1943 – 4 October 1943
- Major Walter Barthe, 15 October 1943 – 8 May 1945

==== IV. Gruppe ====
- Major Erich Simon, 1 November 1942 – 7 October 1943
- Hauptmann Albert Schulz, 8 October 1943 – January 1944
- Hauptmann Franz Buschmann, January 1944 – July 1944
- Hauptmann Heinz Ferger, July 1944 – November 1944
- Major Berthold Ney, November 1944 – 4 March 1945
- Hauptmann Freidrich Tober, 5 March 1945 – 8 May 1945

== Surviving aircraft ==
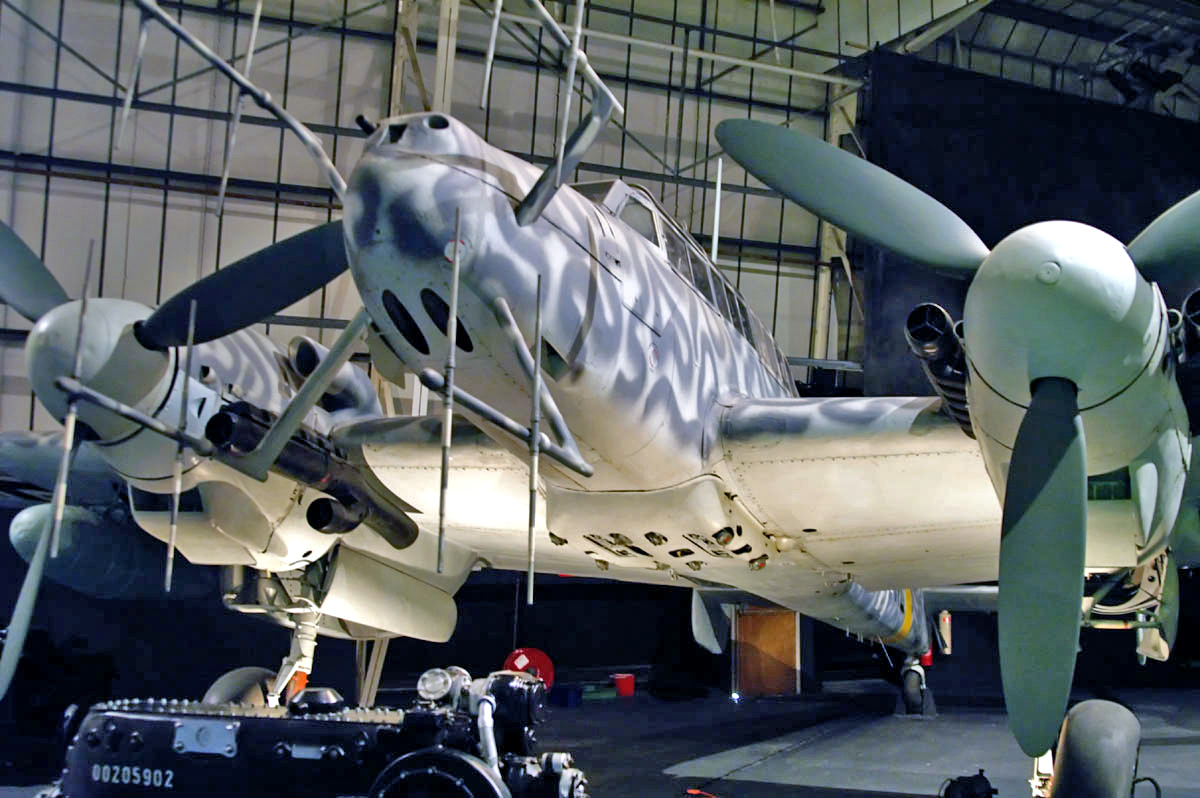
A Bf 110 G-4, formerly of NJG 3, at the RAF Museum in London.

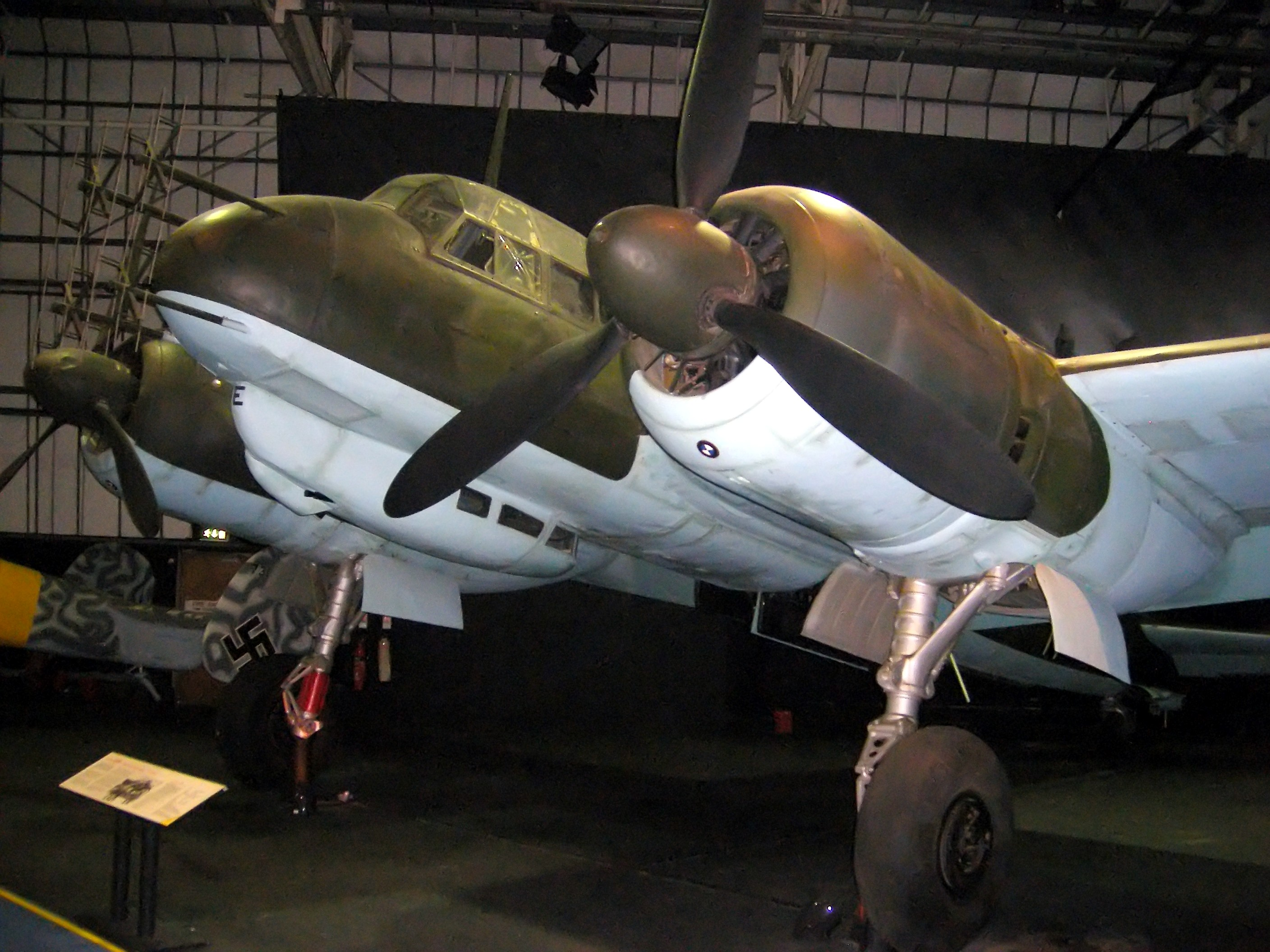
Ju 88 R-1, Werk Nr. 360043, RAF Museum (2008), formerly of NJG 3

Two aircraft that served with NJG 3 are displayed together at the Royal Air Force Museum London, one of the two sites of the Royal Air Force Museum. These are Messerschmitt Bf 110 G Werk Nr. 730301, which was surrendered to the British at the end of the war in 1945, and Junkers Ju 88 R-1, Werk Nr. 360043, which came into British hands in 1943. Both aircraft are almost unique - each is one of only two intact survivors of their type.

== Bibliography ==
- Addison, Paul; Crang, Jeremy (2006). Firestorm: The Bombing of Dresden 1945. London: Pimlico. ISBN 978-1-84413-928-6.
- Aders, Gebhard (1978). History of the German Night Fighter Force, 1917–1945. London: Janes. ISBN 978-0-354-01247-8.
- Balss, Michael (1997). Deutsche Nachtjagd. Materialverluste in Ausbildung und Einsatz Erganzungen zu Personalverlusten in Ausbildung und Einsatz (in German). VDM Heinz Nickel. ISBN 978-3-925480-36-2.
- Bergström, Christer (2015). The Battle of Britain: An Epic Conflict Revisited. Oxford, UK: Casemate. ISBN 978-1612-00347-4.
- Boiten, Theo (1997). Nachtjagd: the night fighter versus bomber war over the Third Reich, 1939–45. London: Crowood Press. ISBN 978-1-86126-086-4.
- Boiten, Theo (1999). Night Airwar: Personal Recollections of the Conflict Over Europe, 1939-45. London: Crowood Press. ISBN 978-1-86126-298-1.
- Boog, Horst; Krebs, Gerhard; Vogel, Detlef (2006). Germany and the Second World War: Volume VII: The Strategic Air War in Europe and the War in the West and East Asia, 1943-1944/5. Clarendon Press. ISBN 978-0-19-822889-9.
- Bowman, Martin (2011). 100 Group (Bomber Support): RAF Bomber Command in World War II. Barnsley, South Yorkshire: Pen and Sword. ISBN 978-1-84415-418-0.
- Bowman, Martin (2016a). Nuremberg: The Blackest Night in RAF History: 30/31 March 1944. Barnsley, South Yorkshire: Pen and Sword. ISBN 978-1-4738-5211-2.
- Bowman, Martin (2016b). Nachtjagd, Defenders of the Reich 1940–1943. Barnsley, South Yorkshire: Pen and Sword Books. ISBN 978-1-4738-4986-0.
- Bowman, Martin; Davey, Chris (2013). Mosquito Bomber/Fighter-Bomber Units 1942–45. Oxford, UK: Osprey Publishing. ISBN 978-1-4728-0049-7.
- Caldwell, Donald L.; Muller, Richard R. (2007). The Luftwaffe over Germany: Defense of the Reich. London, UK: Greenhill Books. ISBN 978-1-85367-712-0.
- Chorley, W. R. (1992). Royal Air Force Bomber Command Losses of the Second World War: Aircraft and Crew Losses, 1944. London: Midland Counties Publications. ISBN 978-0-904597-91-2.
- Cooper, Alan (1992). Air Battle of the Ruhr. London: Airlife Publishing Limited. ISBN 978-1-85310-201-1.
- Cooper, Alan (2013). Bombers Over Berlin: The RAF Offensive November 1943 - March 1944. London: Pen and Sword. ISBN 978-1-78159-065-2.
- Everitt, Chris (1985). The Bomber Command War Diaries: An Operational Reference Book. London: Pen & Sword Aviation. ISBN 978-1-78346-360-2.
- Foreman, John; Parry, Simon; Mathews, Johannes (2004). Luftwaffe Night Fighter Claims 1939–1945. Walton on Thames: Red Kite. ISBN 978-0-9538061-4-0.
- Franks, Norman (1994). The Battle of the Airfields: 1 January 1945. London: Grub St. ISBN 978-1-898697-15-2.
- Hall, R. Cargill (1998). Case Studies in Strategic Bombardment. University of the Pacific. ISBN 978-1-4102-2480-4.
- Hinchliffe, Peter (1998). Luftkrieg bei Nacht 1939–1945 [Air War at Night 1939–1945] (in German). Stuttgart, Germany: Motorbuch Verlag. ISBN 978-3-613-01861-7.
- Hinchliffe, Peter (1999). Schnaufer: Ace of Diamonds. Brimscombe Port, UK: Tempus. ISBN 978-0-7524-1690-8.
- Hooton, E.R. (1999). Eagle in Flames: Defeat of the Luftwaffe. Weidenfeld & Nicolson. ISBN 978-1-85409-343-1.
- Mackay, Ron (2000). Messerschmitt Bf 110. Wiltshire: The Crowood Press. ISBN 978-1-86126-313-1.
- Manrho, John; Pütz, Ron (2004). Bodenplatte: The Luftwaffe's Last Hope-The Attack on Allied Airfields, New Year's Day 1945. Ottringham, UK: Hikoki Publications. ISBN 978-1-902109-40-4.
- Mason, Francis (1969). Battle Over Britain. London, UK: McWhirter Twins. ISBN 978-0-901928-00-9.
- Middlebrook, Martin (1987). The Nuremberg Raid: 30-31 March 1944. London: Penguin. ISBN 9780140081145.
- Middlebrook, Martin (2006). The Peenemunde Raid. Barnsley: Pen & Sword. ISBN 978-1-84415-336-7.
- Murray, Williamson (1983). Strategy for defeat : the Luftwaffe, 1933-1945. Maxwell AFB, Alabama: Air University Press (US Air Force). ISBN 978-1-58566-010-0.
- Parker, Danny S (1998). To Win The Winter Sky: Air War over the Ardennes, 1944-1945. Pennsylvania: Combined. ISBN 978-0-938289-35-7.
- Parry, Simon (2003). Intruders over Britain: The Luftwaffe Night Fighter Offensive 1940 to 1945. London: Air Research Publications. ISBN 978-1-871187-16-8.
- Price, Alfred (1973). Battle Over The Reich. Shepperton, Surrey: Ian Allan. ISBN 978-0-7110-0481-8.
- Price, Alfred (1991). Last year of the Luftwaffe, May 1944 - May 1945. London: Greenhill. ISBN 978-1-85367-440-2.
- Scutts, Jerry (1998). German Night Fighter Aces of World War 2. Oxford, UK: Osprey Publishing. ISBN 978-1-85532-696-5.
- Spick, Mike (1996). Luftwaffe Fighter Aces. New York: Ivy Books. ISBN 978-0-8041-1696-1.
- Tooze, Adam (2006). The Wages of Destruction: The Making and Breaking of the Nazi Economy. London, UK: Allen Lane. ISBN 978-0-14-100348-1.
- Weal, John (2012) [1999]. Messerschmitt Bf 110 Zerstörer Aces of World War 2. Aircraft of the Aces. Vol. 25. London, UK: Osprey Publishing. ISBN 978-1-85532-753-5.
- Webster, C K; Frankland, Noble (1961). Butler, J R M (ed.). The Strategic Air Offensive Against Germany: 1939–1945. History of the Second World War. Vol. II. London: HMSO.
