= Gerhard Raht =

German Luftwaffe military aviator during World War II

- Born: 6 June 1920; Reinfeld, Prussia, Germany
- Died: 11 January 1977 (aged 56); Reinfeld, Schleswig-Holstein, West Germany
- Military career
- Allegiance: Nazi Germany
- Branch: Nazi Germany
- Service years: 1939–1945
- Rank: Hauptmann (captain)
- Units: NJG 3, NJG 2
- Commands: I./NJG 2
- Conflicts: World War II
- Awards: Knight's Cross of the Iron Cross with Oak Leaves

Gerhard Ferdinand Otto Raht (6 June 1920 – 11 January 1977) was a German Luftwaffe military aviator during World War II, a night fighter ace credited with 58 aerial victories claimed in 171 combat missions making him the tenth most successful night fighter pilot in the history of aerial warfare. All of his victories were claimed over the Western Front in Defense of the Reich missions against the Royal Air Force's (RAF) Bomber Command.

Born in Reinfeld, Schleswig-Holstein, Raht grew up in the Weimar Republic and Nazi Germany. Following graduation from school, he joined the military service in 1939 and was trained as a pilot. In early-1941, he transferred to Nachtjagdgeschwader 3 (NJG 1—1st Night Fighter Wing) where he became a night fighter pilot and claimed his first aerial victory on the night of 26/27 July 1942. In Oktober 1943, Raht was appointed Staffelkapitän. Following his 34th aerial victory, he was awarded the Knight's Cross of the Iron Cross on 24 June 1944 and was appointed Gruppenkommandeur (group commander) of I. Gruppe (1st group) of Nachtjagdgeschwader 2 (NJG 2—2nd Night Fighter Wing). He claimed his last five aerial victories on 15/16 March 1945 and was awarded the Knight's Cross of the Iron Cross with Oak Leaves on 15 April 1945.

Raht, who later served as a Hauptmann der Reserve (captain of the reserves) in the German Air Force, died on 11 January 1977 in Reinfeld, Schleswig-Holstein.

== Early life and career ==
Gerhard Raht was born on 6 June 1920 in Reinfeld, Schleswig-Holstein near Bad Oldesloe, in Weimar Germany. He was born into a family of carpenters who ran a furniture making business. After attending school and passing his Abitur (School Leaving Certificate) he opted to join the Luftwaffe as a Fahnenjunker (Officer candidate) on 1 October 1939, one month after the German-Soviet invasion of Poland, which began World War II in Europe. On the 1 February 1941, as an officer candidate, he advanced to the rank of Leutnant. In early 1942 he was assigned to 4. Staffel (Squadron) of Nachtjagdgeschwader 3 (NJG 3—Night Fighter Wing 3).

== World War II ==
A map of part of the Kammhuber Line. The 'belt' and night fighter 'boxes' are shown.

Following the 1939 aerial Battle of the Heligoland Bight, Royal Air Force (RAF) attacks shifted to the cover of darkness, initiating the Defence of the Reich campaign. By mid-1940, Generalmajor (Brigadier General) Josef Kammhuber had established a night air defense system dubbed the Kammhuber Line. It consisted of a series of control sectors equipped with radars and searchlights and an associated night fighter. Each sector named a Himmelbett (canopy bed) would direct the night fighter into visual range with target bombers. In 1941, the Luftwaffe started equipping night fighters with airborne radar such as the Lichtenstein radar. This airborne radar did not come into general use until early 1942.

NJG 3 was initially based at Stade, defending northern Germany. On 3 April 1942 Raht was awarded the Iron Cross 2nd Class (Eisernes Kreuz zweiter Klasse) for his service. It is not clear whether Raht had claimed any aerial successes prior to the award. 4./NJG 3 received credit for the destruction of three bombers on the night of the 1/2 April 1942, between 00:20 and 01:28. The names of the claiming crews are not listed and the type of enemy aircraft and location is also omitted from German records.

Raht's first official victory was recorded on the night of the 26/27 July 1942 when he shot down a Royal Air Force (RAF) Handley Page Halifax southwest of Pellworm at 01:019. This night, Air Marshal Arthur Harris, Air Officer Commanding (AOC) RAF Bomber Command sent a force of 181 Vickers Wellingtons, 77 Avro Lancaster, 73 Halifax, 39 Short Stirling and 33 Handley Page Hampdens against Hamburg, in one of the first raids against the city, before Operation Gomorrah, exactly a year later. By the date of this first victory, Raht had transferred to 5. Staffel. Raht's second victory occurred on 17 January 1943 when he claimed a Lancaster over Hademarschen at 21:59. The victory was recorded with 4. Staffel, indicating he had returned to his original unit. Raht was promoted to Oberleutnant on 1 February 1943.

=== Ruhr and Baltic ===
The night war escalated dramatically in 1943. Harris felt that Bomber Command has amassed sufficient resources to attack and destroy the Ruhr where large concentrations of German war industry was located, and particularly the steel producing centres of Germany. Harris had 53 squadrons available, of which 17 were medium bomber units. Harris also had pathfinder units equipped with H2S radar which mapped the terrain and could penetrate through haze and smoke for greater bombing accuracy. Bomber Command also utilised "window" to confound German ground radar in July. The attacks were dubbed the Battle of the Ruhr (March–July 1943). Raht and NJG 3 were heavily involved in countering Bomber Command's operations.

On the night of 10/11 March 1943, Raht claimed his third victory. At 22:12 south of Middelfart, Denmark. This victory report suggests Raht had once again returned to 5. Staffel. He was also the only German night fighter pilot in the Luftwaffe to claim a victory this night. Bomber Command reported the loss of two Lancasters on mine-laying operations this night. The bomber was identified as Lancaster I ED305, KM-S, No. 44 Squadron RAF crashed into Lille Bælt. Pilot Sergeant Brian T. C. Smith, Flight Engineer Sergeant Gordon R. Black RCAF, navigator Flying Officer Robert H. Carr, Bombardier Sergeant Charles H. D. Cook, wireless operator Geoffrey S. Love, air gunners Sergeant Charles V. Brown and Alfred Healey were killed in action. On 13 March Raht was awarded the Iron Cross 1st Class (Eisernes Kreuz erster Klasse) and appointed Staffelkapitän of 1./NJG 3.

On 30 March at 00:50, over Welmbüttel, Raht shot down a Halifax. Raht became a night fighter ace on 21/22 June when he claimed a Stirling west of Antwerp, Belgium, at 01:32. His victim was claimed out of a 705-strong force that bombed Krefeld. 262 Lancaster, 209 Halifax, 117 Stirling, 105 Wellington bombers, supported by 12 de Havilland Mosquitos took part. Bomber Command lost 44; 17 Halifax and exactly nine each of the Lancaster, Stirling, and Wellington types were lost. On the night of 29/30 July 1943 Raht achieved his most successful night to date, downing four bombers. Over Hanover at 23:10 and southeast Heide at 00:23 he claimed an unidentified heavy bomber and a Lancaster to increase his personal telly to 8. Hovering in the same sector he downed a Halifax southeast of Heide at 00:40 and then northeast of the town that Raht caught and shot down another Halifax at 00:52 for his 10th victory. One of the bombers was No. 158 Squadron RAF Halifax II, JD277 NP-G. Flying Officer A. H. Boyle survived but pilot Flight Sergeant N. R. McDonald and five others were killed. The other may have been Halifax II JB956, KN-O of No. 77 Squadron RAF flown by Flight Sergeant George Henry Sutton. All eight men were killed on their 11th operation. Raht was flying a Dornier Do 217 on this operation.

On 17/18 August 1943, Harris ordered Operation Hydra, a series of attacks against the Peenemünde Army Research Center producing V-weapons. Raht scrambled to intercept but only caught one Lancaster with his radar operator east of Flensburg at 02:57. Raht spotted the bomber caught in searchlights and fired off an identification flare to force the anti-aircraft batteries to cease-fire against the bomber. Raht swiftly dispatched the bomber, identified as ED725 PM-P. It belonged to No. 103 Squadron RAF and P. J. O'Donnell and his crew were killed. On 23/24 August Raht claimed his 12th victory southeast of Thomsdorf at 00:58. Raht did not score a victory again until 27/28 September 1943, when he accounted for a Lancaster over Hanover. The report lists Raht as belonging to 4./NJG 3 at this time. Raht claimed his 14th victory northeast of Stendal. The report described the enemy aircraft as a four engine bomber but did not specify the type. The 15th claim was filed that same night, when he reported a Lancaster shot down over Haguenau.

=== Berlin and North Sea ===
On 18 November 1943 Harris began his Berlin offensive. Stab./NJG 3 under Helmut Lent was based at Stade, I./NJG 3 under Hauptmann Walter Milius, based at Vechta, II./NJG 3 under Egmont Prinz zur Lippe-Weißenfeld, at Schleswig, III./NJG 3 under Major Bart, also at Stade, and IV./NJG 3 under Major Simon at Grove, prepared to meet the offensive. II./NJG 3, to which Raht's most recent unit, 4. Staffel, belonged was equipped with an assortment of Junkers Ju 88C, Messerschmitt Bf 110G and Dornier Do 217 night fighters.

Raht's 16th and first success in the defence of Berlin occurred in the early evening of the 1 December 1943, when he claimed a Stirling shot down over the Frisian Islands at 15:54. It was one of only two claims submitted by a German night fighter pilot on this night. The other was reported shot down by a Feldwebel Wielding north of Aschaffenburg at 21:15. Bomber Command sent 19 Stirling and 12 Halifax aircraft to the Frisians and to the east coast of Denmark on mine-laying operations. Two Stirlings were reported missing. Stirling III EH880 of No. 75 Squadron RAF, piloted by Warrant Officer G. J. S. Kerr was one of the missing aircraft. All the crew perished when it crashed after reaching base. It hit a house at the end of the airfield and five children were killed. Stirling III, EF191, WP-H, of No. 90 Squadron RAF also crashed near Esbjerg in Denmark. Sergeant J. L. Blackwood, E. Draper, J. H. Flack, Warrant Officer J. E. Nixon, Flight Sergeant C. E. Quickfall, Sergeants H. E. Steele and R. G. Whitmarsh were killed.

On 28/29 January 1944 Raht scrambled with 4. Staffel and shot down a Halifax and Lancaster at 02:34 and 02:37. The location of these successes are not recorded. Seventeen days later he accounted for victory number 19 northeast of "Hallersleben" (possibly Fallersleben) at 20:03. On this date, Raht was awarded the German Cross in Gold (Deutsches Kreuz in Gold). Raht reached the 20-mark on 24/25 February 1944 when he shot down a heavy bomber at 22:02 between Metz and Baden-Baden.

Bomber Command switched their effort to Augsburg on 25/26 February 1944. Harris committed 594 bombers, including 461 Lancasters and 123 Halifax bombers supported by 10 Mosquitos. South of Augsburg he accounted for his 21st victory at 22:43. On 15/16 March Raht gained a 22nd victory on 23:12 southwest of Stuttgart. On the night of the 22/23 March Raht achieved two victories at 21:28 near Hanover and two north and northwest of Frankfurt at 21:48 and 21:54 to reach 25. Raht scored again at 22:14, his fourth bomber of the night. North of Berlin scored again on 24/25 March at 22:28 as the Berlin offensive came to an end.

On the night of the 30/31 March 1944, Bomber Command suffered heavy losses on a raid to Nüremberg. The British dispatched 795 aircraft, including 572 Lancasters, 214 Halifaxes and nine Mosquitos. A further 49 Halifax aircraft were sent on minelaying operations in the Heligoland area, 13 Mosquito night fighters were sent to German night-fighter airfields, 34 Mosquitos flew on diversions to Aachen, Cologne and Kassel. 95 bombers were lost: 64 Lancasters and 31 Halifaxes which amounted to 11.9 per cent of the force. It was the largest Bomber Command loss of the war. Some German night fighter pilots scored heavily this night but Hauptmann Raht accounted for just a single claim—a Lancaster—southwest of Bonn at 00:26.

=== Pointblank and Normandy ===
In April 1944 Bomber Command turned to support the American United States Army Air Force (USAAF) Pointblank directive with greater regularity. Against the wishes of Harris, Bomber Command now turned to attacking rail yards, bridges and communications to facilitate Operation Overlord and the D-Day landings when they occurred. II./NJG 3 was based at Vechta on 1 April 1944, at the outset of the offensive. On night of the 22/23 April 1944 Bomber Command attacked targets throughout Germany. Raht caught a Halifax south west of Düsseldorf at 01:23 and another northwest of the city at 01:44 for his 30th victory. One of Raht's victims was Avro Lancaster I DV394, KC-M, from the famous No. 617 Squadron RAF "Dambusters". Flight Lieutenant J. L. Cooper DFC was taken prisoner with all but one of crew—G. J. Harden DFC was the only member of the crew killed. 24/25 April Raht downed a Lancaster 30 to 40 kilometres (19 to 25 miles) south of Echterdingen. The next night over Schweinfurt at 02:15 Raht claimed another Lancaster. On 1 May 1944 Raht was promoted to Hauptmann.

Raht did not score again until the Allied invasion had begun on 6 June 1944. The month he transferred to Nachtjagdgeschwader 2 (NJG 2) as Gruppenkommandeur of I./NJG 2 in France. Raht's combat claim for the night of the 11/12 June 1944 simply stated he shot down a four-engine bomber over the French coast at 00:53. Another unidentified bomber was claimed southeast of Compiègne at 01:01 on 23 June. His 34th victory was one of 11 claims made by German night fighter crews on this night. The main thrust of Bomber Command operations this night had been inland. 221 aircraft—111 Lancaster and 100 Halifax bombers, supported by 10 Mosquitos from No. 1, 4 and 8 Groups attacked railway yards at Laon and Reims. Four Halifax were lost from the Laon raid and four Lancaster bombers from the Reims raid were reported missing. Minelaying sorties around French ports did not incur losses from German defences. Raht was awarded the Knight's Cross of the Iron Cross (Ritterkreuz des Eisernen Kreuzes) on 24 June 1944 for 34 night victories.

A Lancaster over Bailleau-le-Pin at 01:44 on 1 July and another three at 01:04, 01:11 and sector "TD-TE" at 01:29 on 8 July brought his tall to 38. Another double claim at 02:07 and 02:17 over Coulommiers and Gien took him to 40. On the night of the 28/29 July 1944 494 Lancasters and two Mosquitos of No. 1, 3, 5 and 8 Groups attacked Stuttgart. German fighters intercepted the bomber stream while over France on the outward flight; there was a full moon and 39 Lancaster bombers were shot down, 19 per cent of the force. 307 aircraft (187 Halifax, 106 Lancaster, 14 Mosquitos from No. 1, 6 and 8 Groups) raided Hamburg. German fighters again appeared, this time on the homeward flight, and 18 Halifax and four Lancaster bombers were lost, 12 per cent of the force. The bombing was judged ineffective in the later attack. 119 aircraft of No. 1, 4 and 8 Groups also attacked the flying bomb stores area at Forêt De Nieppe without loss. 95 training aircraft flew on a diversionary sweep over the North Sea, and 13 Mosquitos flew to Frankfurt, 50 Mosquito mounted night fighter patrols while five Halifax bombers carried out minelaying in the river Elbe without loss. The conditions and size of the attack saw the Luftwaffe mount a considerable response. This night German night fighters claimed 87 bombers shot down. Raht claimed a bomber shot down his 41st victory over France at 00:45. On 25/26 August 1944 Raht downed his last of the campaign at 01:38 at an unknown location.

=== Defence of the Reich ===
In southern Germany, Raht commanded the Gruppe against night intrusions. On 2/3 February 1945, he accounted for a Halifax and on 3/4 February a Lancaster. Southwest of Mannheim, he claimed a Halifax at 23:49 on the first night and on the second a Lancaster at 20:00 over an unreported location. On the night of 7/8 February 1945, Raht became an "ace-in-a-day" after he claimed six four-engined bombers of unknown type. His victories were claimed at 22:22, at 22:41, at 23:00, at 00:08, at 00:16 and at 00:23 respectively: his 46th to 51st victories.

On the night of the 3/4 March 1945 Raht took part in Operation Gisela, an intruder mission over England. At 23:00 Raht took off leading I./NJG 2 from their base in Twente to intercept a homeward bound Bomber Command raid. Over England, at 01:04 and 01:26 he claimed two four-engine bombers. According to Heinz Rökker, one of Raht's pilots in the group, they flew the Junkers Ju 88G-6 on the mission. The Ju 88s were loaded with bombs and crews were ordered to attack the airfields as well as attack bombers. The group was ordered to fly to the Grimsby–Lincoln area. Rökker was not successful and stated that he believed Raht to be the only successful pilot of the group that night.

On 15/16 March 1945 Bomber Command sent a force of 267 aircraft (134 Lancaster and 122 Halifax bombers plus 11 Mosquitos) of 4, 6 and 8 Groups to bomb Hagen. Six Lancaster and four Halifax bombers were lost. This area attack took place in clear visibility and caused severe damage. The main attack fell in the centre and eastern districts. Another 257 Lancasters and eight Mosquitos of 1 and 8 Groups attacked the refinery at Misburg, on the outskirts of Hannover. Four Lancasters were lost. Ten aircraft—seven four-engine bombers, a B-25 Mitchell, a Mosquito and a Lancaster were claimed shot down by German night fighter pilots this night. Rökker claimed two heavy bombers, the B-25 and Mosquito. Wilhelm Johnen scored his 34th victory against a Lancaster. Raht claimed the other five between 20:49 and 21:20. The locations for each claim are not recorded. Raht had claimed his 54th to 58th, and last victories, of the war.

Raht remained in command of I./NJG 2 until the end of the war. On 15 April 1945, Raht was awarded the Knight's Cross of the Iron Cross with Oak Leaves (Ritterkreuz des Eisernen Kreuzes mit Eichenlaub) as Hauptmann and Gruppenkommandeur of the I./NJG 2, the 833rd officer or soldier of the Wehrmacht so honored. He was taken prisoner when the German forces surrendered on 8/9 May 1945. He joined the German Air Force as a reservist and died on 11 January 1977.

== Summary of career ==
=== Aerial victory claims ===
According to US historian David T. Zabecki, Raht was credited with 58 aerial victories. Foreman, Parry and Mathews, authors of Luftwaffe Night Fighter Claims 1939 – 1945, researched the German Federal Archives and found records for 58 nocturnal victory claims. Mathews and Foreman also published Luftwaffe Aces — Biographies and Victory Claims, listing Raht with 59 aerial victories.

Victory claims were logged to a map-reference (PQ = Planquadrat), for example "PQ 05 Ost KH-57". The Luftwaffe grid map (Jägermeldenetz) covered all of Europe, western Russia and North Africa and was composed of rectangles measuring 15 minutes of latitude by 30 minutes of longitude, an area of about 360 square miles (930 km^{2}). These sectors were then subdivided into 36 smaller units to give a location area 3 km × 4 km (1.9 mi × 2.5 mi) in size.

Chronicle of aerial victories
This and the ♠ (Ace of spades) indicates those aerial victories which made Raht an "ace-in-a-day", a term which designates a fighter pilot who has shot down five or more airplanes in a single day. This and the ! (exclamation mark) indicates aerial victories listed in Luftwaffe Aces — Biographies and Victory Claims but not in Luftwaffe Night Fighter Claims 1939 – 1945.
Claim	Date	Time	Type	Location	Serial No./Squadron No.
– 5. Staffel of Nachtjagdgeschwader 3 –
1	27 July 1943	01:09	Halifax	southwest of Pellworm	
– 4. Staffel of Nachtjagdgeschwader 3 –
2	17 January 1943	21:59	Lancaster	Hademarschen	
– 5. Staffel of Nachtjagdgeschwader 3 –
3	10 March 1943	22:12	Lancaster	south of Middelfart	ED305/No. 44 Squadron RAF
4	30 March 1943	00:50	Halifax	Welmbüttel	
– Stab I. Gruppe of Nachtjagdgeschwader 1 –
5	17 June 1943	02:08	Lancaster	PQ 05 Ost KH-57	
– 1. Staffel of Nachtjagdgeschwader 1 –
6	22 June 1943	01:32	Stirling	12 km (7.5 mi) west of Antwerp	
7	25 June 1943	00:25	Stirling	west of Woensdrecht	
– 4. Staffel of Nachtjagdgeschwader 3 –
8	29 July 1943	23:10	four-engined bomber	Hannover	
– Stab II. Gruppe of Nachtjagdgeschwader 3 –
9	30 July 1943	00:23	Lancaster	20 km (12 mi) southeast of Heide	
10	30 July 1943	00:40	Halifax	20 km (12 mi) southeast of Heide	
11	30 July 1943	00:52	Halifax	25 km (16 mi) northeast of Heide	
12	18 August 1943	02:57	Lancaster	3 km (1.9 mi) east of Flensburg	
13	24 August 1943	00:58	Halifax	1 km (0.62 mi) southeast of Thomsdorf	
– 4. Staffel of Nachtjagdgeschwader 3 –
14	27 September 1943	23:10	Lancaster	Hannover	
15	20 October 1943	20:15	four-engined bomber	15 km (9.3 mi) northeast of Stendal	
16	20 October 1943	22:35	Lancaster	Haguenau	
17	1 December 1943	17:54	Halifax	Frisian Islands	
18	29 January 1944	02:34	Halifax		
19	29 January 1944	02:37	Lancaster		
20	15 February 1944	20:03	Lancaster	northeast of Hadersleben	
21	24 February 1944	22:02	four-engined bomber	Metz-Baden-Baden	
22	25 February 1944	22:43	four-engined bomber	south of Augsburg	
23	15 March 1944	23:12	four-engined bomber	southwest of Stuttgart	
24	22 March 1944	21:28	Lancaster	vicinity of Hannover	
25	22 March 1944	21:48	Lancaster	northwest of Frankfurt am Main	
26	22 March 1944	21:54	Lancaster	north of Frankfurt am Main	
27	22 March 1944	22:14	Lancaster	west-northwest of Frankfurt am Main	
28	24 March 1944	22:28	four-engined bomber	vicinity of Berlin	
29	31 March 1944	00:26	four-engined bomber	southwest of Bonn near beacon "Ida" (Note: Beacon "Ida"—Near Mahlberg in approximately 50°31′N 6°49′E)	
30	23 April 1944	01:23	Halifax	south-southwest of Düsseldorf	
31	23 April 1944	01:44	Lancaster	west-northwest of Düsseldorf	
32	25 April 1944	02:43	four-engined bomber	30–40 km (19–25 mi) south of Echterdingen	
33	27 April 1944	02:15	Lancaster	Schweinfurt	
– Stab I. Gruppe of Nachtjagdgeschwader 2 –
34	12 June 1944	00:53	four-engined bomber	over the French coast	
35	22 June 1944	00:37	four-engined bomber	southeast of Compiègne	
36	1 July 1944	01:44	Lancaster	Bailleau	
37	8 July 1944	01:04	Lancaster	PQ AB-AC	
38	8 July 1944	01:11	Lancaster	PQ AE	
39	8 July 1944	01:29	Lancaster	PQ TD-TE	
40	19 July 1944	02:07	Lancaster	Coulommiers	
41	19 July 1944	02:17	Lancaster	Gien	
42	29 July 1944	00:45	Lancaster	PQ EG-FG	
43!	26 August 1944	01:38	Lancaster	east-southeast of Kaiserslautern	
44	14 January 1945	20:09	Lancaster		
45	2 February 1945	22:41	Halifax	southwest of Mannheim	
46	3 February 1945	20:00	Lancaster		
47♠	7 February 1945	22:22	four-engined bomber		
48♠	7 February 1945	22:41	four-engined bomber		
49♠	7 February 1945	23:00	four-engined bomber		
50♠	8 February 1945	00:08	four-engined bomber		
51♠	8 February 1945	00:16	four-engined bomber		
52♠	8 February 1945	00:23	four-engined bomber		
53	4 March 1945	01:04	four-engined bomber	England	
54	4 March 1945	01:26	four-engined bomber	England	
55♠	15 March 1945	20:49	four-engined bomber		
56♠	15 March 1945	21:00	four-engined bomber		
57♠	15 March 1945	21:09	four-engined bomber		
58♠	15 March 1945	21:14	four-engined bomber		
59♠	15 March 1945	21:20	four-engined bomber		

=== Awards ===
- Iron Cross (1939)
  - 2nd Class (3 April 1942)
  - 1st Class (13 March 1943)
- Honour Goblet of the Luftwaffe on 6 September 1943 as Oberleutnant and pilot (Note: According to Stockert on 30 August 1943.)
- German Cross in Gold on 28 January 1944 as Oberleutnant in the II./Nachtjagdgeschwader 3
- Knight's Cross of the Iron Cross with Oak Leaves
  - Knight's Cross on 24 June 1944 as Oberleutnant and Staffelkapitän of the 1./Nachtjagdgeschwader 2 (Note: According to Scherzer as Staffelkapitän of the 4./Nachtjagdgeschwader 3.)
  - 833rd Oak Leaves on 15 April 1945 as Hauptmann and Gruppenkommandeur of the I./Nachtjagdgeschwader 2

=== Promotions ===
1 February 1941:	Leutnant (second lieutenant)
1 February 1943:	Oberleutnant (first lieutenant)
1 May 1944:	Hauptmann (captain)
