= Heinz Rökker =

German World War II fighter pilot

- Born: 20 October 1920; Oldenburg, Germany
- Died: 2 August 2018 (aged 97); Germany
- Military career
- Allegiance: Nazi Germany; West Germany
- Branch: Luftwaffe; German Air Force
- Service years: 1939–1945
- Rank: Hauptmann (captain)
- Unit: NJG 2
- Conflicts: World War II: Western Front
- Awards: Knight's Cross of the Iron Cross with Oak Leaves

Heinz Rökker (20 October 1920 – 2 August 2018) was a German night fighter pilot in the Luftwaffe during World War II. He was a recipient of the Knight's Cross of the Iron Cross with Oak Leaves. The Knight's Cross (German: Ritterkreuz), and its variants were the highest awards in the military and paramilitary forces of Nazi Germany during World War II. He claimed 64 enemy aircraft (63 at night) shot down, and all were British bombers. Rökker was the eighth-most-successful night fighter pilot in the history of aerial warfare. He died in August 2018 at the age of 97.

== Early life ==
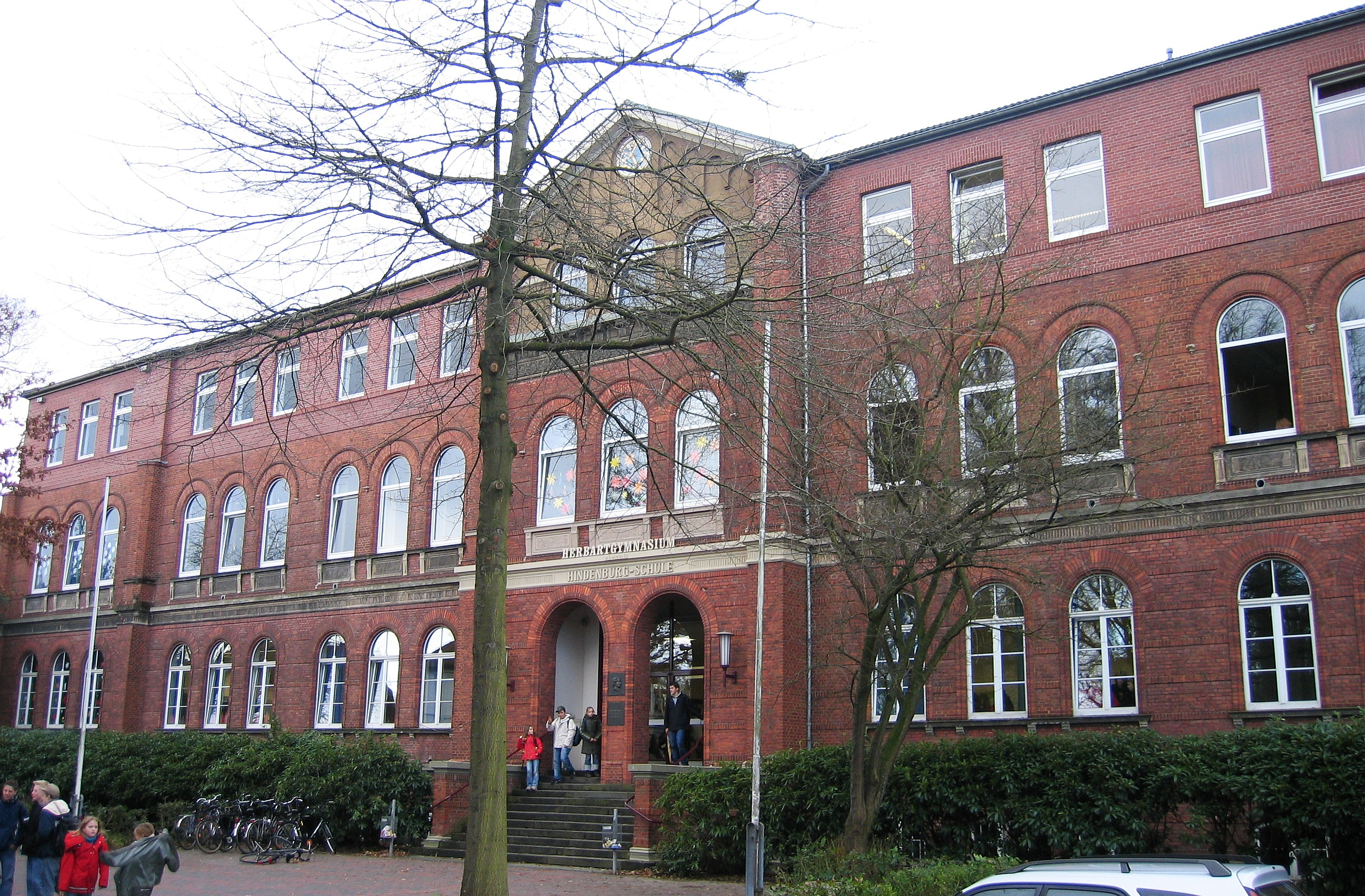
Herbartgymnasiums, formerly the Hindenburg school in Oldenburg

Rökker was born on 20 October 1920 in Oldenburg, in the Free State of Oldenburg of the Weimar Germany. At the age of 19 he passed his Kriegsabitur (war time diploma, a school leaving certificate under accelerated conditions) at the Hindenburg School on Oldenburg and applied to join the Luftwaffe. Rökker was accepted as an officer candidate and entered the Luftwaffe on 1 October 1939, 19 days before his 19th birthday and one month after the German invasion of Poland and the start of World War II in Europe. He was assigned to 4. Staffel of the 22 Flieger-Ausbild Regiment (4th Squadron of the 22nd Pilot Training Regiment) at Güstrow. Rökker then moved to the Fliegerhorstkompanie Wenzendorf (Airfield Company Wenzendorf) on 13 November 1939.

On 14 January 1940 Rökker was transferred to the Luft-Nachschub-Kompanie 5 (5th Aerial Replacement Company) stationed in Gütersloh. From 4 July 1940, he was stationed at Berlin-Gatow with the Schülerkompanie Flugzeugführer-schule (School Company at Advanced Flying School). Rökker was promoted to Gefreiter on 1 October 1940. He then completed advanced training at a flying school near Magdeburg from 20 March—15 August 1941. Rökker attended Blindflugschule 5 in Belgrade, occupied Yugoslavia, from 15 September before completing his training at Nachtjagdschule 1, near Munich on 1 November 1941. During his advanced training, on 1 May and 1 August respectively, he was promoted to the rank of Fähnrich and Oberfähnrich.

== World War II ==
A map of part of the Kammhuber Line. The 'belt' and night fighter 'boxes' are shown.

Following the 1939 aerial Battle of the Heligoland Bight, bombing missions by the Royal Air Force (RAF) shifted to the cover of darkness, initiating the Defence of the Reich campaign. By mid-1940, Generalmajor (Brigadier General) Josef Kammhuber had established a night air defense system dubbed the Kammhuber Line. It consisted of a series of control sectors equipped with radars and searchlights and an associated night fighter. Each sector, named a Himmelbett (canopy bed), would direct the night fighter into visual range with target bombers. In 1941, the Luftwaffe started equipping night fighters with airborne radar such as the Lichtenstein radar. This airborne radar did not come into general use until early 1942.

=== Mediterranean and Egypt ===
Rökker was then posted to 1. Staffel (1st squadron) of Nachtjagdgeschwader 2 (NJG 2—Night Fighter Wing 2) operating in the Mediterranean theatre on 6 May 1942. He remained with this wing until war's end. (Note: For an explanation of the meaning of Luftwaffe unit designation see Organization of the Luftwaffe during World War II.) Carlos Nugent was also posted to 1./NJG 2 in May 1942 and became Rökker's Bordfunker (wireless/radar operator). The unit was located to Catania in Sicily, Italy. From there, it transported to North Africa by ship and was based in Libya. After flying 25 missions Rökker was awarded the Front Flying Clasp of the Luftwaffe in Bronze (Frontflugspange für Nachtjäger in Bronze) on 17 June 1942.

On 31 May 1942 Rökker's Junkers Ju 88 was damaged by anti-aircraft artillery from Allied shipping and he crash landed at Kastelli, on Crete. 20 days later, Rökker shot down a RAF Bristol Beaufort by day on 20 June 1942, near Crete. The time was recorded as 17:20 local time. His aircraft received several hits from return fire during the action, but he landed safely. Rökker's victim was Beaufort DD959, No. 217 Squadron RAF piloted by Flying Officer Frank J. R. Minster and crewed by Sergeant W. A. R. King, J Moschonas and J.A. Bowyer. All of these men were posted missing in action and were never found. Rökker began night intruder missions in June and over British lines in Africa. Over Mersa Matruh, Egypt, on the night of the 25/26 June 1942 he engaged a Vickers Wellington southwest of the city and shot it down at 22:45. He attacked and claimed another at 00:09.

On the night of the 28/29 June at 23:58 he encountered another Wellington which he claimed for fourth victory. The machine was R1029, of No. 108 Squadron RAF, which he damaged severely and which was destroyed in a crash-landing. Rökker's Ju 88C was severely damaged and he was also forced to crash-land. Squadron leader D. H. Jacklin, DFC and his crew, survived. Rökker was awarded the Iron Cross second class (Eisernes Kreuz zweiter Klasse) and Wound Badge after the battle on 3 and 14 July 1942 respectively.

On 28 July, Rökker achieved his last victory in Africa. East of Tobruk at 23:10 he shot down another Wellington for his fifth victory. The aircraft was Wellington HX364, from No. 70 Squadron RAF. Pilot Sergeant H. Osborne and his crew survived ditching in the sea, were rescued by an Italian ship the Lino Bixo and taken prisoner. However, gunners K. Hatch, E. A. Jones, K. S. McDonald subsequently drowned when the vessel was sunk by a Royal Navy submarine off Greece on 17 August 1942.

Although 1./NJG 2 was briefly relocated to Belgium on 4 August 1942, reaching northern Europe on 5 August, the Staffel was relocated back to the Mediterranean theatre based in Sicily on 9 February 1943. During his time in Belgium Rökker was responsible for the air defence of Belgium and northern France. On 14 August 1942 he was awarded the Iron Cross first class (Eisernes Kreuz erster Klasse) for 50 missions and five victories but he achieved no further success in that region. In that period Rökker had been appointed Staffelkapitan (squadron leader), on 15 December 1942.

In April 1943, Rökker achieved his last victory over the southern fronts when he shot down a Wellington at 01:15 on 19 April 1943 over Marettimo, Aegadian Islands, west of Sicily. The machine was certainly HX487, of No. 221 Squadron RAF based at RAF Luqa on Malta. Squadron leader Michael Foulis, DFC and Bar was lost with nine other men. It was possibly on a transfer that day, explaining why so many men were aboard. Of the nine men reported killed, four had previously flown with Foulis on torpedo operations.

=== Defence of the Reich ===
In July 1943, 1./NJG 2 were back in Europe to undertake Defence of the Reich duties. On 2 July he flew his last operation in the south and NJG 2 relocated back northwest Europe. Rökker claimed his next victories on 24 August 1943 southwest of Berlin at 00:35 and 00:50, a Lancaster and Halifax, for his seventh and eighth. On 1 December 1943 Rökker was promoted to Oberleutnant. The following month he was awarded the Front Flying Clasp of the Luftwaffe in Gold (Frontflugspange für Nachtjäger in Gold) for 100 night fighter operations. In February 1944 Rökker claimed two successes over Berlin as Bomber Command began a five-month campaign against the German capital. On the 24 February 1944 Rökker recorded a Short Stirling at 22:43 south of Heilbronn. The following night he claimed a Lancaster at 21:43, west of Hagenau.

Rökker claimed three victories on the night of 15/16 March 1944. At 22:26, west of Stuttgart, Rökker and his radar operator detected a Lancaster with the FuG 350 Naxos radar detector system, which picked up the emissions of HS2 radar installed in RAF bombers. Using the front, rather than Schräge Musik armament, he shot down three bombers. One was flown by Squadron leader R. Blackwell-Smith from No. 9 Squadron RAF. Rökker decided to repeat an attack with the frontal guns. The Ju 88 was spotted and Blackwell-Smith dived and carried out the corkscrew, a standard British bomber evasion tactic. In the turning fight that began, Rökker was assisted by his radar operator who opened fire with the hand-held defensive guns. Rear turret gunner Australian Flight Sergeant Eric Birrell did not fire, either because he was killed in action or the hydraulics had been damaged and the turret would not operate. Upper turret gunner Sergeant Brian Glover returned fire but missed. Radio operator Ronald West was killed and Flying Officer Herbert Sheasby, navigator Pilot Officer Douglas Eley, the Canadian bomb-aimer, did not survive their parachute jumps. The successes were recorded southwest of Strasbourg at 22:26, west of Hagenau at 22:35, and west of Stuttgart at 22:55.

On 22/23 March and 24/25 March 1944, he claimed three shot down on each night. On the first night of these operations he shot down the Handley Page Halifax flown by Richard Atkins from No. 578 Squadron RAF over Steinringsberg near Herborn at 22:35. Atkins was the only pilot of the squadron to reach the last mission of his tour. This night he was joined by Group captain Nigel Marwood-Elton DFC. Another member of the crew was Flight sergeant, Eric Sanderson the tail gunner. Sanderson saw Rökker's Ju 88 "slide" underneath his turret and he called to the pilot to take evasive action. At one point he told the pilot to bank the bomber so the upper-mid gunner could fire down at the Ju 88 but Sanderson reported the Ju 88 remained below and behind them before firing and hitting the bomb bay and fuel tanks in the wings. All eight men parachuted clear and survived the encounter. In his combat report, Rökker mentioned Atkins by name (presumably having learned it from intelligence reports).

On the latter night, he shot down the Lancaster II "D-King" flown by Flight Sergeant Jim Newman at 23:20 between Leipzig and Berlin. (Note: In 1998, Joe Cleary, a survivor of Newman's crew, met with Rökker in Oldenburg. Together they visited the Lancaster's crash site near Oberkirchen.) One of the crew, Nicholas Alkemade survived a free fall of 18,000 feet (5,490m) without a parachute. Engineer Edgar Warren, bomb-aimer Charles Hilder, and mid-upper gunner John McDonough were burned to death in the aircraft. The three bombers reported destroyed on 22/23 March were recorded south of Aurich at 21:30, and in the vicinity of Koblenz at 22:27 and 22:35. The other two on 24/25 March claims were reported over Bernburg at 23:20 and east of Kassel at 23:48 for his 20th victory. Over the course of April and May 1944, Rökker achieved another seven victories over western Germany, eastern Belgium and Netherlands including three on the 12 May recorded between 00:23 and 00:49 over Brussels and Zeebrugge. The last appears to have been uncredited.

In June, Rökker's unit was heavily engaged over the Western Front. On 6 June 1944, the Western Allies initiated Operation Overlord which began the Battle of Normandy. On the first day of the landing, the British Army attempted to capture Caen. The Battle of Caen lasted for two months and NJG 2 flew night fighter operations against Bomber Command intrusions. On the night of 6/7 June, Rökker claimed five RAF bombers. The first was claimed southwest of Caen at 02:42. The next four were claimed at 02:48, 02:51, 03:01 and 03:08. The final two were claimed to the west of the city and all were Lancasters. The mission inflated Rökker's claims to 32. No. 5 Group RAF lost six Lancasters in the Caen area this night—10 Lancasters and one Halifax were lost and 13 were claimed by German night fighter pilots. Rökker is the only pilot known to have claimed in the vicinity. On 13 June 1944 Rökker was awarded the German Cross in Gold. South of Dieppe another Lancaster was claimed at 00:16 on 25 June and two more fell on 26 July at 03:21 and 04:38, northwest Châteaudun. Rökker was awarded the Knight's Cross of the Iron Cross (Ritterkreuz des Eisernen Kreuzes) for 35 (or 36) night victories on 27 July 1944. In the early hours of the 29 July he intercepted two Lancaster bombers over Orléans and near Chaumont, and claimed them destroyed at 00:14 and 01:17. One of these bombers belonged to No. 514 Squadron RAF. It was flown by Flight Lieutenant Robert Jones; only Sergeants Tom Harvell (engineer) and George Robinson (navigator) survived. Harvell evaded capture but Robinson became a prisoner of war.

Rökker recorded three bombers destroyed on 7/8 August between 23:20 and 00:06 northeast of Le Havre. This included his 40th victory. After Normandy, NJG 2 relocated to Germany from France and Belgium. On 4 November 1944 he claimed four bombers in the Dortmund area between 19:31 and 20:06. On New Year's Day 1945, Rökker downed a Lancaster near Geldern. It was recorded at 20:07 in the evening. On the evening of 5 January he accounted for two Lancasters—one north of Nienburg at 19:19 and another northwest of Hannover at 19:29. In February 1945 Rökker continued to achieve interceptions and file claims. On the night of the 1/2 February 1945 he accounted for a single Avro Lancaster bomber near Koblenz for his 50th victory. Rökker recorded three more victories on the night of 3/4 February to take his score to 53. The latter success were claimed between 19:31 and 19:56 CET; the first over Krefeld and the last two victories were scored over Geldern. A Douglas A-20 Havoc was shot down over Eindhoven Airport on 7/8 February and another Lancaster over Fulda on the evening of 14 February brought his tally to 55. On the night of 21/22 February 1945, he claimed six Lancaster bombers between 20:46 and 21:19 CET. The first two Lancasters were claimed over Wageningen and 's-Hertogenbosch, the remaining four were shot down in the vicinity of Eindhoven. Heinz Rökker had now destroyed 61 enemy aircraft. That night, the RAF lost 34 aircraft in the attack on Duisburg, Worms and the Mittelland Canal, 26 of which were credited to Rökker, Heinz-Wolfgang Schnaufer, Günther Bahr and Johannes Hager. On the night of the 3/4 March, Rökker participated in Operation Gisela, the failed intruder operation over eastern England. He failed to shoot down any aircraft on this night. For his achievements Rökker was awarded the 781st Knight's Cross of the Iron Cross with Oak Leaves (Ritterkreuz des Eisernen Kreuzes mit Eichenlaub) on 12 March 1945.

On the night of 15/16 March 1945, Rökker recorded four enemy aircraft shot down as his last victories of the war. Two were recorded as four-engine heavy bombers over Düsseldorf with two minutes of each other at 20:50 and 20:52. At 21:26 and 21:34, Heinz Rökker flew over Sint-Truiden Air Base, formerly a Luftwaffe night fighter base, and claimed a B-25 Mitchell and de Havilland Mosquito shot down.

As a Luftwaffe night fighter pilot, he mainly flew the Junkers Ju 88 G-1. Rökker was credited with 64 victories (from a total of 65 claims) in 161 missions. He recorded 63 of his victories at night, including 55 four-engine bombers. Carlos Nugent flew almost 150 missions with Rökker and, on 28 April 1945, became one of the few Bordfunker's decorated with the Knight's Cross.

== Summary of career ==
=== Aerial victory claims ===
According to US historian David T. Zabecki, Rökker was credited with 64 aerial victories. (Note: For a list of Luftwaffe night fighter aces see List of German World War II night fighter aces) This figure includes 63 nocturnal and one daytime victories claimed in 161 combat missions. His 64 aerial victory claims include 55 four-engined bombers and one Mosquito. On the night 6/7 June 1944 and 21/22 February 1945, Rökker became an "ace-in-a-day". (Note: According to Spick, Rökker flew 170 combat missions.)

Chronicle of aerial victories
This and the ♠ (Ace of spades) indicates those aerial victories which made Rökker an ace-in-a-day, a term which designates a fighter pilot who has shot down five or more airplanes in a single day. This and the – (dash) indicates unconfirmed aerial victory claims for which Rökker did not receive credit.
Claim	Date	Time	Type	Location	Serial No./Squadron No.
– 1. Staffel of Nachtjagdgeschwader 2 –
1	20 June 1942	17:20	Beaufort	south Crete	DD959/No. 217 Squadron
2	25 June 1942	23:45	Wellington	50 km (31 mi) southwest Mersa Matruh	
3	26 June 1942	00:09	Wellington	40 km (25 mi) southwest Mersa Matruh	
4	28 June 1942	23:58	Wellington	60 km (37 mi) southeast Mersa Matruh	Wellington R1029/No. 108 Squadron
5	28 July 1942	23:10	Wellington	east Tobruk	
6	19 April 1943	01:15	Wellington	south Marettimo	
7	24 August 1943	00:35	Lancaster	20 km (12 mi) southwest Berlin	
8	24 August 1943	00:50	Lancaster	15 km (9.3 mi) south-southwest Berlin	
9	20 December 1943	19:47	Lancaster	Rothenberg	
– 2. Staffel of Nachtjagdgeschwader 2 –
10	24 February 1944	22:43	Stirling	south Heilbronn	
11	25 February 1944	21:43	Lancaster	west Hagenau	
12	15 March 1944	22:26	Lancaster	50 km (31 mi) southwest Strasbourg	
13	15 March 1944	22:35	Lancaster	west Hagenau	
14	15 March 1944	22:55	Lancaster	west Stuttgart	
15	22 March 1944	21:30	Lancaster	south Aurich	
16	22 March 1944	22:27	Lancaster	Koblenz-Limburg	
17	22 March 1944	22:35	Halifax	north Koblenz	
18	24 March 1944	22:50	Lancaster	Berlin-Leipzig	
19	24 March 1944	23:20	Halifax	southwest Bernburg	
20	24 March 1944	23:48	Lancaster	east Kassel	
21	26 March 1944	22:55	four-engined bomber	München-Gladbach (Note: In 1950, the name was changed to Mönchen-Gladbach and to Mönchengladbach in 1960.)	
22	23 April 1944	01:58	Lancaster	50 km (31 mi) northwest Düsseldorf	
23	25 April 1944	02:05	Lancaster	30 km (19 mi) northeast München	
24	28 April 1944	01:39	Halifax	Freiburg im Breisgau	
25	12 May 1944	00:23	Lancaster	20–50 km (12–31 mi) northwest Brussels	
26	12 May 1944	00:35	Lancaster	off Zeebrügge	Lancaster LM454/No. 61 Squadron
—	12 May 1944	00:49	Lancaster	—	Lancaster ND919/No. 75 (NZ) Squadron
27	28 May 1944	02:08	Halifax	20–40 km (12–25 mi) northwest Eindhoven	
28♠	7 June 1944	02:42	Lancaster	10–50 km (6.2–31.1 mi) southwest Caen	
29♠	7 June 1944	02:48	Lancaster	10–50 km (6.2–31.1 mi) southwest Caen	
30♠	7 June 1944	02:51	Lancaster	southwest Caen	
31♠	7 June 1944	03:01	Lancaster	west Caen	
32♠	7 June 1944	03:08	Lancaster	west Caen	
33	25 June 1944	00:16	Lancaster	south Dieppe	
34	26 July 1944	03:21	four-engined bomber	northeast Romilly	
35	26 July 1944	04:38	Lancaster	northwest Châteaudun	
36	29 July 1944	00:14	four-engined bomber	Orléans	
37	29 July 1944	01:17	Lancaster	50 km (31 mi) northeast Chaumont	
38	7 August 1944	23:29	Lancaster	northeast Le Havre	
39	7 August 1944	23:35	Lancaster	northeast Le Havre	
40	8 August 1944	00:06	Lancaster	northeast Le Havre	
41	19 October 1944	21:48	Lancaster	Pirmasens	
42	4 November 1944	19:31	Lancaster	north Dortmund	ME865/No. 101 Squadron
43	4 November 1944	19:36	Lancaster	north Dortmund	
44	4 November 1944	20:00	Halifax	north Geldern	
45	4 November 1944	20:06	Halifax	north Geldern	
46	1 January 1945	20:07	Lancaster	southeast Geldern	
47	5 January 1945	19:19	Halifax	north Nienburg	
48	5 January 1945	19:29	Lancaster	northwest Hannover	
49	1 February 1945	19:46	Lancaster	north Koblenz	
50	3 February 1945	19:31	Lancaster	northeast Krefeld	
51	3 February 1945	19:51	Lancaster	north Geldern	
52	3 February 1945	19:56	Lancaster	north Geldern	
53	8 February 1945	00:21	Boston	Eindhoven airfield	
54	14 February 1945	22:03	Lancaster	south Fulda	
55♠	21 February 1945	20:46	Lancaster	south Wageningen	
56♠	21 February 1945	20:56	Lancaster	southwest 's-Hertogenbosch	
57♠	21 February 1945	21:06	Lancaster	southeast Eindhoven	
58♠	21 February 1945	21:12	Lancaster	southwest Eindhoven	
59♠	21 February 1945	21:13	Lancaster	southwest Eindhoven	
60♠	21 February 1945	21:19	Lancaster	southwest Eindhoven	
61	15 March 1945	20:50	four-engined bomber	north Düsseldorf	
62	15 March 1945	20:52	four-engined bomber	north Düsseldorf	
63	15 March 1945	21:26	B-25	at St. Trond airfield	
64	15 March 1945	21:34	Mosquito	at St. Trond airfield	

=== Awards ===
- Front Flying Clasp of the Luftwaffe
  - in Bronze (17 June 1942)
  - in Silver (5 August 1942)
  - in Gold (19 January 1944)
- Iron Cross (1939)
  - 2nd Class (3 July 1942)
  - 1st Class (14 August 1942)
- Wound Badge in Black (14 July 1942)
- Honour Goblet of the Luftwaffe (Ehrenpokal der Luftwaffe) on 12 June 1944
- German Cross in Gold on 13 June 1944 as Oberleutnant in the 2./Nachtjagdgeschwader 2
- Knight's Cross of the Iron Cross with Oak Leaves
  - Knight's Cross on 27 July 1944 as Oberleutnant and Staffelkapitän of the 2./Nachtjagdgeschwader 2
  - 781st Oak Leaves on 12 March 1945 as Hauptmann and Staffelkapitän of the 2./Nachtjagdgeschwader 2

=== Promotions ===
1 October 1940:	Gefreiter (private)
1 May 1941:	Fähnrich (officer candidate)
1 August 1941:	Oberfähnrich (officer cadet)
1 November 1941:	Leutnant (second lieutenant)
1 December 1943:	Oberleutnant (first lieutenant)
1 August 1944:	Hauptmann (captain)

== Publications ==
- Chronik I. Gruppe Nachtjagdgeschwader 2 I. /NJG 2. Juli 1940 bis Kriegsende 1945 Fernnachtjagd 1940–1942. [Chronicle of I. Group of the 2nd Night Fighter Wing I./NJG July 1940 to the End of the War 1945 Long Range Nighter Fighter 1940–1942.] (in German). VDM Heinz Nickel, Zweibrücken 1997, ISBN 3-925480-24-2.
- Chronik der Tennisabteilung des Oldenburger Turnerbundes 1931–2001. [Chronicle of the Tennis Department of the Oldenburger Turnerbundes 1931-2001.] (in German). Isensee, Oldenburg 2003, ISBN 3-89995-052-6.
- Ausbildung und Einsatz eines Nachtjägers im II. Weltkrieg – Erinnerung aus dem Kriegstagebuch [Training and Employment of a Night Fighter in the Second World War - Recollections from the War Diary] (in German). VDM Heinz Nickel, Zweibrücken 2006, ISBN 978-3-86619-008-5.
