= Günther Bahr =

German flying ace (1921–2009)

- Born: 18 July 1921; Neu Legden, East Prussia
- Died: 29 April 2009 (aged 87); Wacken in Schleswig-Holstein, Germany
- Military career
- Allegiance: Nazi Germany (to 1945); West Germany
- Branch: Luftwaffe; German Air Force
- Service years: 1940–1945; 1962–1975
- Rank: Oberfeldwebel (Wehrmacht); Major (Bundeswehr)
- Units: ZG 1, NJG 1, NJG 4, NJG 6
- Conflicts: See battles World War II: Eastern Front; Defense of the Reich; Second Raid on Schweinfurt
- Awards: Knight's Cross of the Iron Cross
- Other work: Bundeswehr

Günther Wolfgang Bahr (18 July 1921 – 29 April 2009) was a German Luftwaffe fighter pilot and night fighter flying ace during World War II. He claimed 36 victories at night, plus one further daytime aerial victory, all of which were four-engine bombers, achieved in over 90 combat missions. He counted 37 victories over all. He was also a recipient of the Knight's Cross of the Iron Cross. Bahr died in April 2009 at the age of 87. (Note: For a list of Luftwaffe night fighter aces see List of German World War II night fighter aces)

== Career ==
Bahr was born on 18 July 1921 in Neu-Legden, a small settlement northeast of Königsberg, East Prussia, present-day part of Dobroje in the Guryevsky District of Kaliningrad Oblast. On 19 December 1941, he was posted to 6. Staffel (6th squadron) of Schnellkampfgeschwader 210 (SKG 210—210th Fast-Bomber Wing) which was fighting on the Eastern Front. In January 1942, SKG 210 became Zerstörergeschwader 1 (ZG 1—1st Destroyer Wing). In consequence, Bahr served with 6. Staffel of ZG 1.

=== Night fighting ===
A map of part of the Kammhuber Line. The 'belt' and night fighter 'boxes' are shown.

Following the 1939 aerial Battle of the Heligoland Bight, bombing missions by the Royal Air Force (RAF) shifted to the cover of darkness, initiating the Defence of the Reich campaign. By mid-1940, Generalmajor (Brigadier General) Josef Kammhuber had established a night air defense system dubbed the Kammhuber Line. It consisted of a series of control sectors equipped with radars and searchlights and an associated night fighter. Each sector, named a Himmelbett (canopy bed), would direct the night fighter into visual range with target bombers. In 1941, the Luftwaffe started equipping night fighters with airborne radar such as the Lichtenstein radar. This airborne radar did not come into general use until early 1942.

In late March 1942, Bahr began training as a night fighter pilot and was then transferred to the I. Gruppe (1st group) of Nachtjagdgeschwader 1 (NJG 1—1st Night Fighter Wing). On the night of 23/24 August 1943, the RAF targeted Berlin with 727 Avro Lancaster, Handley Page Halifax, Short Stirling and de Havilland Mosquito bombers, losing 57 aircraft in the attack. Defending against this mission, Bahr claimed his first nocturnal aerial victories over a Halifax and Stirling bomber. On 14 October, during the second Raid on Schweinfurt, he claimed a daytime aerial victory over a United States Army Air Forces (USAAF) Boeing B-17 Flying Fortress bomber shot down 20 kilometers (12 miles) southeast of Schweinfurt. Bomber Command targeted Hanover on the night of 18/19 October. That night, Bahr claimed the destruction of a Lancaster bomber 35 kilometers (22 miles) west of Hamelin. On 3/4 November, Bomber Command's main target was Düsseldorf, hit by 577 bombers and 12 Mosquitos. That night, the RAF lost 18 bombers with further 37 damaged. Bahr filed claim for a Halifax bomber shot down 25 kilometers (16 miles) west of Düsseldorf.

On the night of 20/21 December 1943, the RAF targeted Frankfurt am Main. Defending against this attack, Bahr claimed three Halifax bombers, two of which may have been from No. 10 Squadron. On the night of 21/22 February 1945, Bahr became an "ace-in-a-day". That night, the RAF had targeted Duisburg, Worms and the Mittelland Canal. Bahr, flying a Messerschmitt Bf 110 G with his crew, radio operator Feldwebel Arno Rehmer and air gunner Unteroffizier Kurt Riediger, were vectored to the bomber stream heading for Worms and shot down seven bombers. That night, the RAF lost 34 aircraft, 26 of which were credited to Bahr, Heinz-Wolfgang Schnaufer, Heinz Rökker and Johannes Hager. Bahr was awarded the Knight's Cross of the Iron Cross (Ritterkreuz des Eisernen Kreuzes) on 28 March 1945.

=== With the German Air Force ===
Following World War II, Bahr rejoined military service with the German Air Force, at the time referred to as the Bundesluftwaffe, in 1962. As a Major (major), he retired in 1975. Bahr died in April 2009.

== Summary of career ==
=== Aerial victory claims ===
According to Spick, Bahr was credited with 36 nocturnal aerial victories claimed in approximately 90 nocturnal combat missions, plus one further daytime claim. Foreman, Mathews and Parry, authors of Luftwaffe Night Fighter Claims 1939 – 1945, list 36 nocturnal victory claims, numerically ranging from 2 to 37. Mathews and Foreman also published Luftwaffe Aces — Biographies and Victory Claims, listing Bahr with 35 claims, plus two further unconfirmed claims.

Chronicle of aerial victories
This and the ♠ (Ace of spades) indicates those aerial victories which made Bahr an "ace-in-a-day", a term which designates a fighter pilot who has shot down five or more airplanes in a single day. This along with the ! (exclamation mark) indicates a daytime aerial victory. This and the – (dash) indicates unconfirmed aerial victory claims for which Bahr did not receive credit. This and the ? (question mark) indicates information discrepancies listed in Luftwaffe Night Fighter Claims 1939 – 1945 and in Luftwaffe Aces — Biographies and Victory Claims.
Claim	Date	Time	Type	Location	Serial No./Squadron No.
– 6. Staffel of Zerstörergeschwader 1 –
—	4 March 1942	—	R-5		
– 3. Staffel of Nachtjagdgeschwader 6 –
2? (Note: Mathews and Foreman in Luftwaffe Aces — Biographies and Victory Claims list this claim as unconfirmed.)	24 August 1943	00:40	Halifax	Berlin	
3	24 August 1943	00:47	Stirling	north of Berlin	
4!	14 October 1943	14:57	B-17	20 km (12 mi) southeast of Schweinfurt	
5	18 October 1943	20:43	Lancaster	35 km (22 mi) west of Hamelin	Lancaster DV159/No. 100 Squadron RAF
6	3 November 1943	19:55	Halifax	25 km (16 mi) west of Düsseldorf	
7	17 November 1943	20:16	Lancaster	south-southwest of Hochspeyer	Lancaster JB226/No. 405 Squadron RCAF
8	20 December 1943	19:24	Halifax	south-southeast of Mayern	
9	20 December 1943	19:38	Halifax	50 km (31 mi) southwest of Koblenz	
10	20 December 1943	20:00	Halifax	Ruppach	
11	30 January 1944	20:14	Lancaster	Warwitz	
12	30 January 1944	20:25	Lancaster	50 km (31 mi) west of Oranienburg	
13	20 February 1944	03:20	Lancaster	15–20 km (9.3–12.4 mi) south-southwest of Stendal	
14	25 February 1944	21:28	Lancaster	southeast of Neufchâteau	
15	27 April 1944	02:45	Lancaster	15 km (9.3 mi) northwest of Kirchenhall	
16	28 April 1944	01:37	Halifax	30–60 km (19–37 mi) northwest of Friedrichshafen	
17	28 April 1944	02:51	Lancaster	50–80 km (31–50 mi) northwest of Friedrichshafen	
– 1. Staffel of Nachtjagdgeschwader 6 –
18	29 July 1944	02:08	Lancaster	30–50 km (19–31 mi) from Stuttgart	Lancaster ND872/No. 207 Squadron RAF
19	26 August 1944	01:15	Lancaster	west of Rüsselsheim am Main	
20	12 September 1944	22:46	B-17	northwest of Mannheim	
– 3. Staffel of Nachtjagdgeschwader 6 –
21	8 January 1945	22:27	Lancaster	west of Munich	
22	8 January 1945	22:30	Lancaster	west of Munich	
23	8 January 1945	22:36	B-24	Munich	
24	8 January 1945	22:38	B-24	west-northwest of Munich	
25	28 January 1945	23:32	Lancaster	Stuttgart	
26	28 January 1945	23:39	Lancaster	west of Stuttgart	
27	28 January 1945	23:46	Lancaster	Ludwigsburg	
28	28 January 1945	23:59	Lancaster	east of Mannheim	
29♠	21 February 1945	20:34	Halifax	southwest of Worms	
30♠	21 February 1945	20:37	Halifax	southwest of Worms	
31♠	21 February 1945	20:39	Halifax	southwest of Worms	
32♠	21 February 1945	20:42	Halifax	southwest of Worms	
33♠	21 February 1945	20:44	Halifax	southwest of Worms	
34♠	21 February 1945	20:46	Halifax	southwest of Worms	
35♠	21 February 1945	20:50	Halifax	southwest of Worms	
36	23 February 1945	20:09	Lancaster	vicinity of Pforzheim	
37	16 March 1945	21:31	Lancaster	southwest of Nuremberg	

=== Awards ===
- Iron Cross (1939) 2nd and 1st Class
- Honour Goblet of the Luftwaffe on 15 May 1944 as Feldwebel and pilot
- German Cross in Gold on 13 June 1944 as Oberfeldwebel in the 3./Nachtjagdgeschwader 6
- Knight's Cross of the Iron Cross on 28 March 1945 Oberfeldwebel and pilot in the I./Nachtjagdgeschwader 6
