= Operation Gisela =

1945 WWII Luftwaffe air operation

- Part of Defence of the Reich
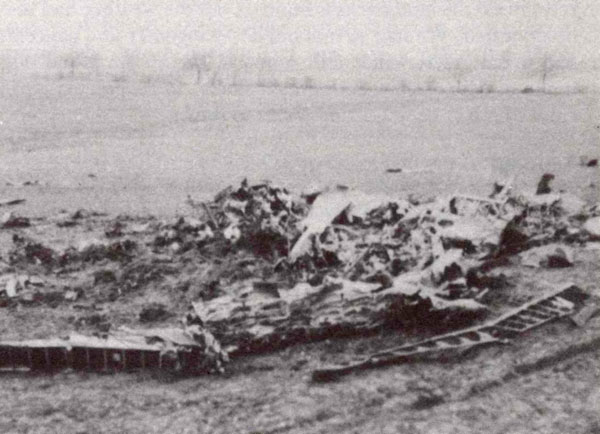
- Handley Page Halifax HX332 of 10 Squadron burned out in a Yorkshire field. Five of the seven crew were killed when the aircraft was shot down by Leutnant Arnold Döring, one of 34 aircraft damaged or destroyed by Gisela.
Date	3–4 March 1945
Location	England, North Sea and northern Germany
Result	British victory

Belligerents
(Nazi Germany) Germany	United Kingdom

Commanders and leaders
(Nazi Germany) Hermann Göring; (Nazi Germany) Joseph Schmid	(United Kingdom) John Whitley; (United Kingdom) Edward Addison

Strength
Nachtjagdgeschwader 1; Nachtjagdgeschwader 2; Nachtjagdgeschwader 3; Nachtjagdgeschwader 4; Nachtjagdgeschwader 5	4 Group; 100 Group

Casualties and losses
22 aircraft destroyed; 12 aircraft damaged; 45 killed; 11 injured	24 aircraft destroyed; 9 aircraft damaged; 78 killed; 18 wounded; 17 civilians killed; 12 civilians severely wounded

Operation Gisela (German: Unternehmen Gisela) was the code name for a German military operation of the Second World War. Gisela was an intruder operation against RAF Bomber Command during the Defence of the Reich campaign. It was the last big operation launched by the Luftwaffe Nachtjagdgeschwader (Night Fighter Wings) during the conflict.

By March 1945 the Luftwaffe had lost air superiority over all fronts. Western Allied air forces held air supremacy over the German Reich and remaining German-occupied territory. German industrial cities were now subjected to intensive bombardment which inflicted enormous damage on the German war effort. The United States Army Air Forces attacked by day, while RAF Bomber Command operated by night.

Allied armies had overrun some German towns and cities. The defeat in Normandy and the Allied advance across Western Europe broke the Kammhuber Line through occupied France, Belgium and the Netherlands and much of its early warning network had been lost. The Luftwaffe failed to produce enough night fighter crews, exacerbated by the fuel shortage that contributed to the collapse of training programs and grounded combat units. RAF de Havilland Mosquito night fighter intruders operated over Germany against such nightighters that took off.

Experienced night fighter commanders and pilots suggested a return to intruder operations over England. In 1940–1941, German night fighters had flown intruder sorties to attack RAF bombers as they tried to land. Adolf Hitler had ordered a cessation of these activities for propaganda and practical reasons but the operations had met with reasonable success and it was felt they might do so again. Hermann Göring, commander-in-chief of the Luftwaffe, sanctioned the operation. An opportunity occurred on the night of the 3/4 March 1945, when Bomber Command attacked targets in western Germany. The operation failed to achieve the results hoped for; the success of the attacking force were not commensurate with the losses suffered.

== Background ==
=== Intruder history ===
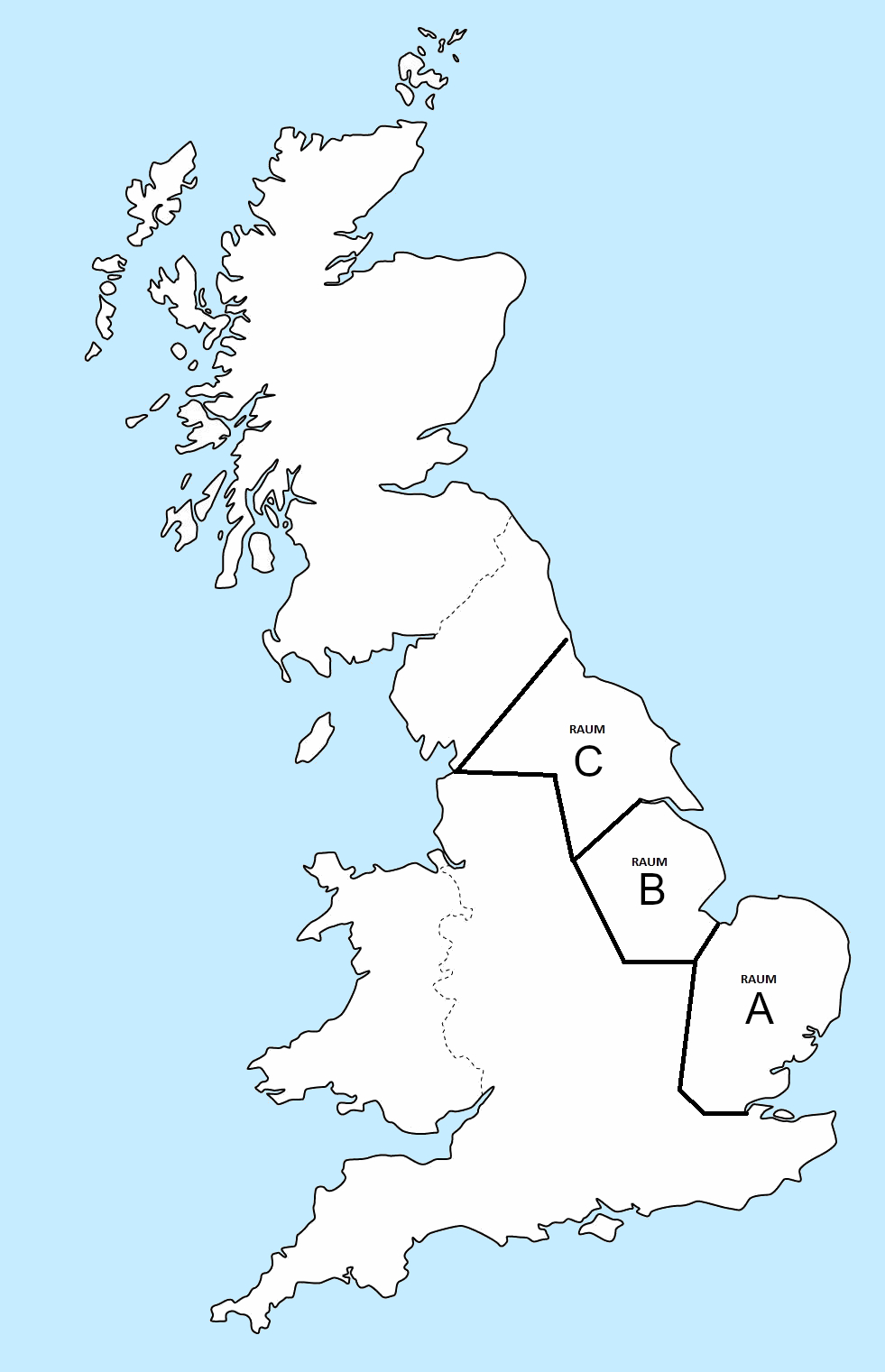
Boundary map drawn up by the Luftwaffe in 1940. It remained unchanged for the duration of the war. Intruders were to patrol the areas.

German air doctrine had seen little need for the development of a nocturnal night air defence system and the Luftwaffe concentrated on the offensive use of air power. The failure of the Luftwaffe in the Battle of Britain in 1940 ended hopes for an early conclusion of the war. Faced with German domination of the continent, the only weapon the British could use to exert immediate military pressure on Germany was the night bombing operations of RAF Bomber Command. Bomber Command had been forced to operate at night since December 1939 and the Battle of the Heligoland Bight when debilitating losses in daylight forced the RAF to abandon these operations. These raids, though inaccurate and wholly ineffective, were causing embarrassment to the Commander-in-Chief of the Luftwaffe and the second most powerful man in Germany, Reichsmarschall (Imperial Marshal) Hermann Göring, who had once boasted "You may call me Meyer" if enemy bombers ever flew over Germany. He ordered the creation a new force set up on 26 June 1940, to combat the night raids.

Göring appointed a respected and experienced pilot, Geschwaderkommodore (Wing Commander) Wolfgang Falck to develop a new organisation and consequently Falck founded Nachtjagdgeschwader 1 (Night Fighter Wing 1 or NJG 1). Within a year four more Geschwader (Wings) were founded; Nachtjagdgeschwader 2 (NJG 2), Nachtjagdgeschwader 3 (NJG 3), and Nachtjagdgeschwader 4 (NJG 4). All of these units were in existence by April 1941. To improve the management of the expanding night fighter force, the Erste Nachtjagd Division (1st Night Fighter Division) was established on 17 July 1940, commanded by Oberst (Colonel) Josef Kammhuber. An aggressive commander, Kammhuber founded the Fernnachtjagd, or long-range night fighter intruder force. The nucleus of this force was derived from I./NJG 2 which would remain the only intruder unit.

The Germans quickly developed a series of basic tactics for intercepting enemy intruders. The lack of airborne radar at this stage in the war meant finding and destroying Allied bombers at night was a difficult prospect, thus it was decided to use the Fernnachtjagd in operations over Britain. Major Kuhlmann, head of the wireless telegraphy interception service played a significant part in assisting the Luftwaffe night fighter force as did Wolfgang Martini's Luftnachrichtentruppe (Air Signal Corps). Intercepting British signal communications by monitoring the radio traffic of enemy ground stations and aircraft the Germans could determine where and at what airfields RAF night activity was occurring. With the British base identified Falck could then move against them over their own airfields. Three waves could then be deployed; one to attack the bombers as they took off, one to cover the known routes taken by the enemy over the North Sea, and the third to attack them on landing at a time when, after a long flight, enemy crews were tired and much less alert. For operational purposes, Eastern England was divided into four regions or Räume (areas). Raum A was Yorkshire, bounded by Hull, Leeds, Lancaster and Newcastle. Raum B covered the Midlands and Lincolnshire whilst Raum C encompassed East Anglia bounded by London Peterborough, Luton and The Wash. Operations began in earnest in October 1940.

While sound in theory, it proved much more difficult in practice. Inexperience told and by December 1940 NJG 2 had lost 32 aircrew killed in action and 12 aircraft lost in exchange for 18 RAF aircraft claimed shot down. Despite the claims made by German crews, evidence showed a considerable amount of over claiming, and the difficulty in substantiating claims at night and over enemy territory became evident.

In 1941, the German night fighter intruders began achieving substantial successes. British ground defences, which had taken their toll on the German units in 1940, were now side-stepped by a decision to shift the area of operations to the North Sea, by the English coast. In June German night fighter units claimed 22 RAF aircraft; 18 over the sea. In July 19 British aircraft were claimed for four losses. By October 1941 British loss records listed 54 aircraft of all types destroyed and a further 44 damaged in these operations to all causes. German losses amounted to 27 destroyed and 31 damaged to all causes.

While the number of losses incurred against German night fighters was not significantly large the psychological damage was substantial. A high number of crashes owed much to nervous British bomber pilots who did not feel safe over their own airfields and consequently landed too hard and fast, or refused to go around a second time for fear of enemy intruders. Just as it appeared that night intruder sorties were showing promise. Adolf Hitler ordered a cessation of operations. For propaganda purposes, he thought that the morale of the German people would be better served by seeing British bombers destroyed and wrecked over German territory. Hitler was also reticent owing the fact there had been no noticeable reduction in British air raids and the RAF had not adopted these methods during The Blitz. This order came into effect on 12 October 1941. Kammhuber would unsuccessfully lobby to have intruder operations reinstated and his efforts to expand the intruder force beyond a single unit were thwarted by an uninterested High Command which was inundated with requests for reinforcements in other theatres.

=== Operational situation (1945) ===
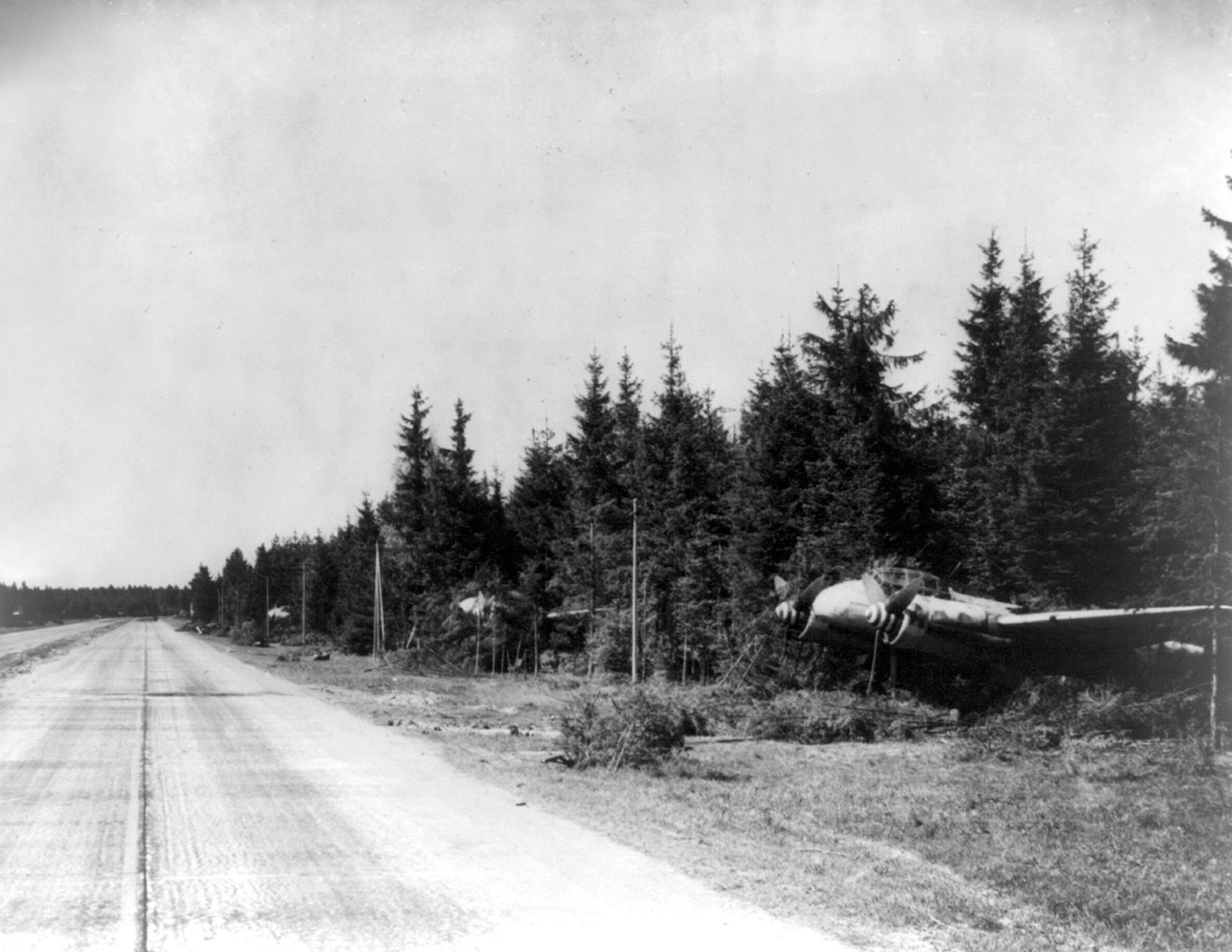
Ju 88 heavy fighters hidden beside a Reichsautobahn, early 1945. Strafing attacks by Allied aircraft were a constant danger.

Over the next three years the Combined Bomber Offensive had forced the Luftwaffe to devote resources to air defence. In the campaign against the RAF, the German system, named the Kammhuber Line, had become increasingly sophisticated. In 1942 the introduction of Lichtenstein radar, despite its early teething troubles and greater improvements in the armament and capability of German night fighters produced a force capable of inflicting heavy losses on British bomber streams. Though British losses rarely reached more than ten per cent of a raid—considered a minimum target to irreparably damage British combat power—the night fighter force grew in size and potency. British losses in the Battle of the Ruhr (March–July 1943) and most notably in the Battle of Berlin (November 1943 – March 1944) reached an all-time high; 569 bombers in the latter campaign.

To increase the toll on Allied bombers further, intruder operations restarted briefly in August 1943 and took place intermittently or on the initiative of single crews, since no organised Fernnachtjagd existed after October 1941. Success was still possible, on 22 April 1944 the United States Army Air Force (USAAF) 1st Bombardment Division and 3rd Bombardment Division were returning to England in darkening skies after a daylight raid over Germany. They were attacked by an element of Messerschmitt Me 410 bomber destroyers of Kampfgeschwader 51 (KG 51—Bomber Wing 51) over their bases. Over the next twenty minutes, ten aircraft, nine of them B-24 Liberators, were shot down and 61 men killed for the loss of only two Me 410s and four airmen. The attack coincided with Operation Steinbock, a bombing and intruder offensive against Greater London and in response to the British offensive against German industrial cities, but the operation was aimed at the British capital rather than British bomber bases.

In mid-1944 a series of developments impaired the German night fighter defence permanently. The most serious was the collapse of the German front in the Battle of Normandy in August. The defeat led to the advance of the Allied armies across France into Belgium and the southern Netherlands. The Kammhuber Line, which ran through these countries, was eliminated leaving only the northern portions, in northern Germany, the Netherlands and Denmark intact and exposing the Ruhr. Night fighting over France and Europe was also proving increasingly costly. The RAF consistently struck on moonlit nights and bombers were accompanied by a strong number of long-range de Havilland Mosquito night fighter intruder escorts from No. 100 Group RAF. As a consequence of these developments, and just three months after the German night fighter arm's most successful campaign over Berlin, it was fast becoming an insignificant force. Although numerically stronger and with more formidable aircraft designs than ever before (including the Heinkel He 219), the British were winning the electronics war and had succeeded in jamming German radar and radio communications to the extent German countermeasures were "useless". German SN-2 radar and Naxos radar detector had been negated by new Bomber Command tactics. These tactics resulted from the capture of the sets by the British in July 1944 which allowed the RAF to develop counter-measures.

The oil campaign over Romania and against the synthetic oil plants in the Ruhr—in which most oilfields had been destroyed, captured or damaged by 1945—triggered a critical fuel shortage from the autumn of 1944 onwards which denied the Luftwaffe the resources to capitalise on its numerical strength. Paradoxically, production was able to replace the relatively small losses and operational serviceability reached an all-time high since ground crews had more opportunity to work on machines. The Luftwaffe was still capable of taking a toll on Bomber Command on occasion, but unless more powerful radars and communications could be introduced in time it was doubtful British air superiority at night could be challenged. The impotence of the night fighter force as an organisation was demonstrated during the attack on Dresden when the second wave of Allied bombers was hardly opposed. Operation Clarion, launched later that month, was not adequately opposed either.

== German plan ==
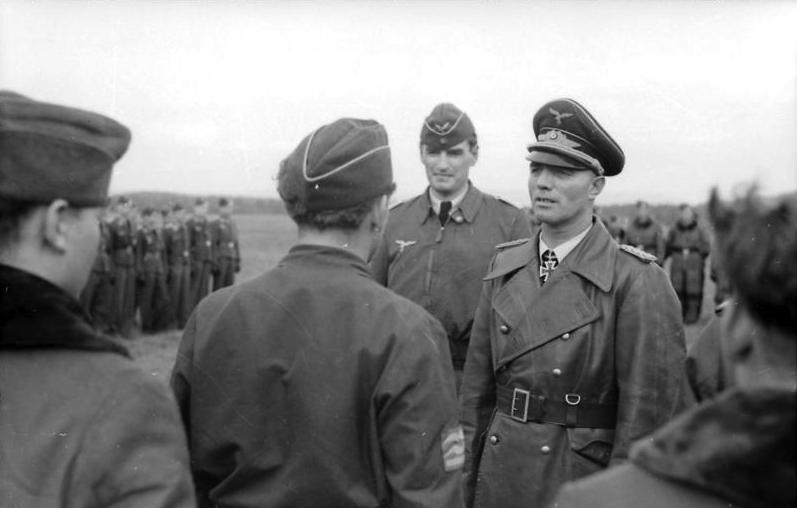
Joseph Schmid, the architect of Gisela.

The removal of Kammhuber as commanding officer of night air defences in September 1943 did not prevent further appeals for the reinstatement of intruder operations. His replacement as General der Nachtjagd (General of Night Fighters), was Generalleutnant (Lieutenant General) Joseph Schmid, commanding 1. Jagdkorps (1st Fighter Corps). Schmid had long argued for a repeat of intruder operations and first pressed for their resumption in December 1943. His proposals were rejected by Göring on the grounds that intruder operations were not his business. Schmid did not receive substantive support from other field commanders, most notably Hans-Jürgen Stumpff, who objected to the operation after meeting with Schmid in January and February 1944 on the grounds that Hitler opposed such operations and newer German radar was not to fall into Allied hands. Four months later, attitudes had not changed. Generalmajor Dietrich Peltz, commanding Angriffsführer England (Bomber Leader England) and IX. Fliegerkorps showed little interest in intruder missions either, since his remaining forces were engaged in night attacks against the Allied beachheads in Normandy. In October 1944, he finally won support from Werner Streib, Inspekteur der Nachtjagd (Inspector of Night Fighters) to press for an operation again. The plan was simple; a large force of 600–700 night fighters were to be gathered and sent out in one simultaneous operation.

Independently of Schmid's actions, another figure has also been credited with ensuring Gisela took place. Heinz-Wolfgang Schnaufer—who was to the end the war as the most successful night fighter ace on 121 aerial victories—was said to have attempted to gain support for a like-minded offensive. Schnaufer pursued RAF bombers regularly to the English coast, or least the other side of the frontline. He experienced a lack of British interference beyond German-held territory. He recalled that he could fly around as if it was peace time, since all British jamming and interference stopped immediately once he was in Allied airspace.

Schnaufer submitted a proposal to his commander, Walter Grabmann, commanding 3. Jagd-Division (3rd Fighter Division), that an intruder operation be allowed to take place. Schnaufer proposed waiting until the enemy had crossed beyond the lines over the North Sea before attacking them. Grabmann was enthusiastic, and suggested the operation go further and attack the enemy bombers while they were attempting to land in eastern England. Schnaufer also became aware of Schmid's desire for an intruder operation at this time and personally urged him to approach the High Command once more.

Hitler was finally convinced of the need to try every possible method to stop Bomber Command's night offensive over Germany. The operation was sanctioned by the OKL in November. Secrecy of the operation was paramount. The problem of preparing a large number of crews produced security fears which was recognised clearly. When crews of NJG 3 and NJG 2 were called to a briefing on Gisela, they were locked behind guarded doors. The crews were told that all available night fighters would participate in an all-out attack against Bomber Command over their airfields in England. The tactical deployment for the operation, they were told, was for two waves of night fighters to cross the coast in the region of Hull. To avoid enemy radar raiders were told to fly at minimum altitude and then climb to 4,500 metres (14,800 feet) as they reached the coast, generally believed to be the average operating height of British bombers. The Luftwaffe Western Front Intelligence Summary Service prepared dossiers for crews to study. It advised on the layout of British airfields and the lighting systems, such as the Drem Lighting system, along with funnel lights and angle of glide indicators. Crews were informed about RAF lighting codes on the control towers which warned RAF bomber crews of a possible intruder in the vicinity.

=== Intelligence breach ===
German security was breached within weeks. On 1 January 1945, after participating in Operation Bodenplatte to support the German Ardennes Offensive, a Ju 88 (code D5+PT) flown by Unteroffizier (Corporal) Lattoch belonging to 9./NJG 3 landed at Luxembourg in error. Lattoch had been present at the briefing on 1 December 1944 and was taken prisoner of war. He was soon handed over to the intelligence branch of the US Ninth Air Force. He divulged the details of the meeting and this information was passed to the Air Ministry.

RAF Fighter Command and Bomber Command attempted to warn all of their airborne units of the potential danger and bomber units were ordered to plan alternate landing sites in the event of an attack on their airfields. All bomber and fighter groups were linked by telephone and ground control passed on all details of intruder operations to pilots including height and heading when they occurred. Station Commands organised blackouts of airfields and pilots could be ordered to switch the navigation lights off at any time. Only the Mosquito groups remained active against intruders, though the majority of these units were supporting Allied operations on the continent.

The British propaganda radio station Soldatensender Calais (Soldiers' Radio Calais) was used to conspicuously broadcast to the Germans that they knew about a planned intruder operation by playing the contemporary song I dance with Gisela tonight. The operation was suspended repeatedly until the British relaxed vigilance.

== The operation ==
=== British raid triggering Gisela ===
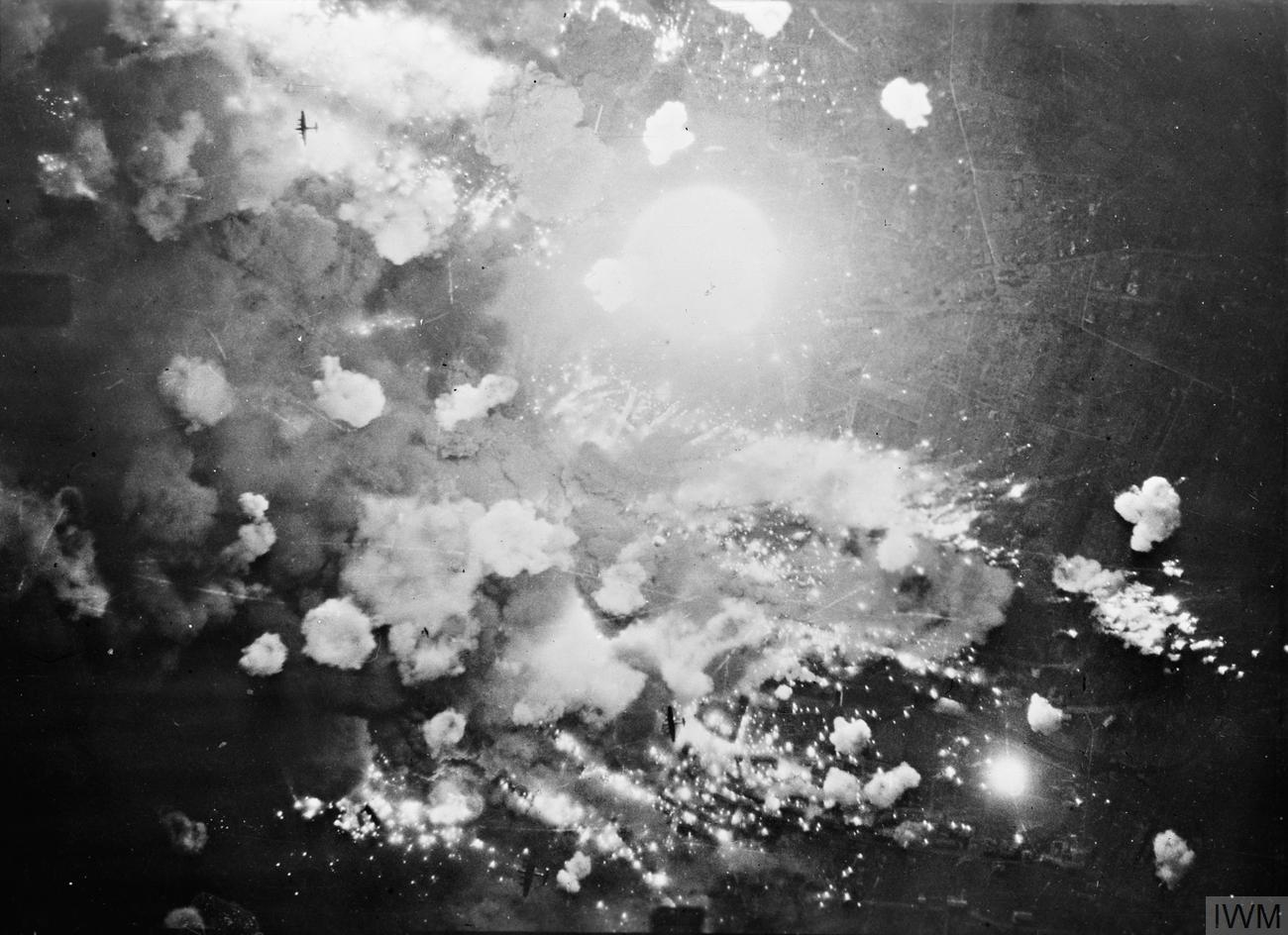
A similar scene to the one that occurred over Ladbergen and Kamen; a raid on Pforzheim, 23 February 1945.

At midday on 3 March 1945 teletype messages from Bomber Command Headquarters at RAF High Wycombe began reaching the airfields of RAF squadrons in Eastern England. On this night a planned raid with moderate numbers of bombers was planned over western Germany. A complex plan of feint attacks and diversions to deceive German air defence system was drawn up. The main force was split into two separate groups in the Münster area; No. 4 Group RAF were ordered to destroy the synthetic oil plant at Kamen and No. 5 Group RAF would attempt to eliminate the aqueduct, safety gates, and canal boats on the Dortmund–Ems Canal at Ladbergen.

Nearly 5,000 RAF airmen prepared to take part, in 817 heavy bombers which were fuelled and armed in the evening. A trigger plan was prepared which would act as a feint, but this night weather conditions partially compromised the feint, and Bomber Command amended it. Bomber streams were permitted to fly over Ingoldmells Point to Filey, but not over coastal areas where no ground defences were stationed. The route took them downstream to southern England by Reading, and across the English Channel, as the trigger plan required. However, they were then ordered to turn back towards the North Sea due to low-lying cloud over the continent that night. The clouds made it difficult for pilots to see and steer clear of zones heavily guarded by Allied ground defences near the frontline, risking the loss of aircraft to friendly fire.

At 18:00 the first aircraft began to take-off. The first RAF aircraft over Germany were medium bomber variants of the de Havilland Mosquito. No. 8 Group RAF committed 89 to bomb Berlin and Würzburg. The Mosquitos marked the area with target indicators while 64 others dropped 59 tons of bombs. Six Mosquitos marked Würzburg, which was then bombed, while 24 others each dropped a blockbuster bomb in a concentrated area east of the river causing a large fire. None of the crews noticed any defence of the target.

The task of 5 Group and No. 1 Group RAF, with 15 and 16 Avro Lancaster bombers, was to drop about 36 Mark IV and 54 Mark VI naval mines in Oslo harbour. One No. 1 Group Lancaster was shot down by a NJG 3 Ju 88 night fighter patrolling the Kattegat near Denmark; German Major Werner Husemann achieved his 33rd air victory in this action, confirmed through British records. No 1 Group claimed a victory against a Ju 88 in return. No. 11 Group sent 12 Handley Page Halifax bombers and four Short Stirlings which formed a Mandrel Screen to jam long-range Freya and Würzburg radar. They patrolled in orbit for two hours over the North Sea. One Mosquito and seven Halifaxes from No. 192 Squadron RAF accompanied No. 4 Group to Kammen while monitoring enemy radio transmissions.

Other diversion operations included 40 Lancasters, 19 Halifaxes and 35 Vickers Wellingtons from No. 7 Group RAF flying toward the Frisian Islands. Some aircraft withdrew owing to mechanical difficulties, but 91 dropped 3,721 bundles of diversionary Window over the North Sea. Five Halifaxes, three B-24 Liberators and eight B-17 Flying Fortress also assisted with jamming operations. The USAAF committed 24 B-24s to bomb Emden in support of the main force. Just before the main attack No. 100 Group committed 10 Halifaxes and six Mosquitos to drop target markers over Meppen to mislead German ground controllers into believing it was the target. The bombers struck Ladbergen and the canal burst its banks, the safety gates were overwhelmed, and canal boats were stranded. The attack lasted 25 minutes.

The jamming operations were effective, but the decision to pack a large number of aircraft into relatively small airspace made it certain that German night fighters would locate some aircraft. At this time, German policy was to commit only Experten to battle as they had the skill and experience to find and shoot down Allied bombers. The first fighters were being vectored onto their targets as the bombs began to fall on Ladbergen. Four pilots claimed all eight of the Lancasters lost on the raid out of an operating force of some 203 bombers. Geschwaderkommodore of NJG 4, Heinz-Wolfgang Schnaufer claimed two; Hauptmann (Captain) Hermann Greiner claimed three; Hauptmann Josef Kraft claimed two, while Major Martin Drewes claimed one.

No. 4 Group attacked Kamen. Mosquitos from No. 8 Group marked the target from 28,000–35,000 feet (8,534–10,668 m). No 8 Group also sent 21 Lancasters to assist. They dropped 98 tons of high explosive bombs which effectively illuminated the synthetic oil plant for the following 181 Halifaxes. Although German night fighters were seen, none attacked the bombers. A total of 690 tons of bombs hit the target area in 10 minutes. The 29 Mosquito night fighters sent by RAF Fighter Command orbited the area in the hope of intercepting German fighters. Two night fighters were claimed destroyed and one damaged for no losses. German sources confirm two night fighters destroyed over Germany to enemy aircraft and four damaged.

=== Gisela: German counter-attack ===
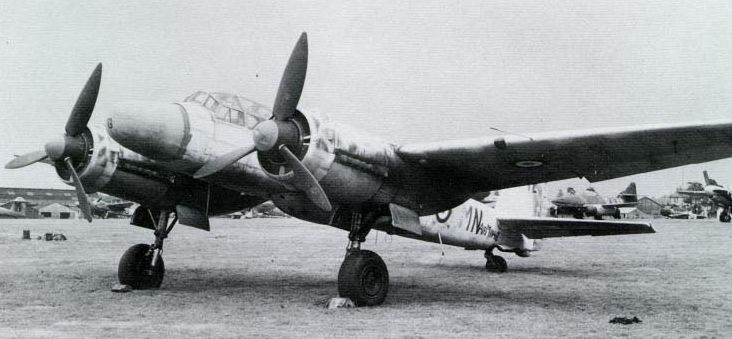
A Ju 88G-6 night fighter with FuG 240 Berlin Cavity magnetron radar. The Ju 88G was the backbone of the German night fighter force.

Wolfgang Martini's Luftnachrichtentruppe (Air Signal Corps) had already busied themselves with searching the air waves for signs of a British raid. Before the first RAF bombers had taken off, they had already determined that a raid of at least 500 aircraft would take place that night. The Luftwaffe defences were alerted. Shortly afterwards the code word Gisela was issued to fighter units. Some German units did not treat the message with the urgency required. It was likely, after several months, that unit officers and aircrews had forgotten that the name identified the offensive air patrol they had been briefed about in late 1944; crews were given a refresher briefing. They were informed there was a 50 kilometres per hour (30 mph) north wind. A strong front was moving across the North Sea, so the bombers would fly above it on the return leg, but the fighters would have to fly under it in heavy rain, to keep below British radar defences.

The first Ju 88s took off at 23:00 and began heading toward the Dutch coast, where they dived to sea level and stayed at approximately 50 metres while they flew out to sea. Crews were forbidden to engage enemy aircraft over the North Sea in order to preserve surprise until the last possible moment. The rain and squall assisted crews in judging the location and distance of the water. However, with crews prone to human error, it was decided to use the very accurate FuG 101 radar altimeter and the Ju 88s blind-flying instruments. The strain on the crews was enormous, as a careful vigil was kept on them until the British coast was reached and the pilot began his ascent to the height of the returning bomber stream. As they did so, the Ju 88s released Düppel to obscure the radar of Mosquito fighters. The pilots were then free to begin their attacks.

Just after midnight on 4 March 1945, as the bombers crossed over the English coast, a Ju 88 night fighter opened fire on a No. 214 Squadron RAF B-17 returning from a Window patrol, the opening salvo of Gisela. The bomber was damaged, but landed safely at RAF Oulton, whose station commander reported an intruder over his station; soon after radar screens picked up large numbers of hostile aircraft. The headquarters of 100 Group were alerted and a scramble order given to Mosquito squadrons. A "scram" order was also issued to bomber units still airborne;, warning crews that intruders were in the vicinity and they were to divert to airfields in western or southern England. The second victim of the night was a Mosquito of No. 169 Squadron RAF which was probably shot down while en route to its alternative landing site.

A large number of returning bombers only began receiving their warning and diversion orders at 00:45 hours. Halifaxes of No. 4 Group were finally alerted at this time. It was too late to prevent the Ju 88s from sighting, and then homing in on a mass of landing lights. Crews from NJG 2 and NJG 4 were able to deliver beam and Schräge Musik attacks against the unaware crews. Pilots who had been alerted in time were able to carry out a corkscrew manoeuvre to evade attack. Some bombers were able to land but were then strafed and destroyed; this gave the crews a better chance of escaping than destruction in the air.

At RAF Winthorpe the Ju 88s attacked bombers illuminated by the landing lights. Leutnant Arnold Döring of IV./NJG 3 engaged and destroyed two bombers between 01:05 and 01:15 using his Schräge Musik. British crews who witnessed the action switched off their navigation lights, and he did not engage another bomber successfully. Döring had been told not to return with any ammunition so he engaged any targets of opportunity. He shot up a locomotive and set a wagon on fire. During the ten minutes in which Döring had claimed his victories, nine bombers had been destroyed. At 01:05 60 of No. 5 Group's Lancasters were still airborne and further losses were incurred against NJG 5 machines.

No. 100 Group were searching for intruders in force by 01:30, at which time the intruders had already spent 90 minutes over England. Several Ju 88s were chased out to sea and two were claimed as shot down. Three Ju 88s crashed while making ground attacks on targets of opportunity. Leo Zimmermann of NJG 5 attempted to attack an Air Transport Command B-24 using his Schräge Musik but was spotted. Evasive action by the pilot avoided an attack and the Ju 88 was seen to crash into the ground after its wing tip made contact with the runway. Eight minutes later Heinrich Conze, also of NJG 5, attempted to attack a car driven by Royal Observer Corps member J P Kelway. The Ju 88 struck power lines as it attacked and crashed into the car killing Kelway and the German crew. Over Pocklington Johann Dreher and his crew attempted to attack a landing Halifax and then a taxi that had its headlights on and was travelling along a parallel road near the airfield. Dreher hit some trees as he dived to low-level and all aboard were killed; these were the last German airmen to crash on British soil during the war.

The most dangerous part of the operation was over by 02:15. The intruders had spent over an hour in British airspace. Now the journey back over the sea to Germany and the Netherlands was undertaken. The British had jammed German radio beacons and switched on others with the same frequency. It was hoped this would fool German pilots into landing in Britain, but experienced pilots did not fall for the ruse. They then had to fly over the sea navigating by unreliable dead reckoning. While around only five Ju 88s were lost in combat over England, eight crews were missing, three were killed in crash-landings, six crews had baled out, and eleven aircraft crashed or were damaged on landing.

=== German claims ===
This is an incomplete record of claims submitted by German crews during Gisela. It is likely that some of the crews that did not return from the operation would also have filed claims for air victories.

No	Pilot	Unit	Aircraft type	Details of combat
1–2	Hauptmann Roth	I./NJG 2	Two four-engine bombers	Two claims, times and career victory total unknown.
3–4	Oberleutnant Walter Briegleb	7./NJG 2	Two four engine bombers	Claimed two Lancasters; south of Waddington at 00:36 and 00:56 west of Lincoln for his 25–26th abschüsse—claim/victory.
5–6	Leutnant Arnold Döring	10./NJG 3	One B-17, one Lancaster	Claimed his 3–4th victories. One B-17 was claimed over RAF Oulton.
7–8	Hauptmann Heinz-Horst Hißbach	II./NJG 2	One four engine bomber	Claimed his 29–30th victories at an unrecorded time and location.
9–10	Oberleutnant Josef Förster	II./NJG 2	Two four engine bombers	Claimed two bombers over England at a time and location unknown for his 13–14 victories.
11	Feldwebel Heinz Misch	IV./NJG 3	One four engine bomber	Claimed his ninth victory. Time and location unknown.
12	Feldwebel Heinz Koppe	III./NJG 2	One four engine bomber	Claimed his seventh victory. Time and location unknown.
13	Leutnant Robert Wolf	III./NJG 5	One Lancaster	Claimed a Lancaster over the Humber Estuary for his 18th victory.
14	Feldwebel Schmidt	IV./NJG 3	One Lancaster	Claimed near Croft at 2:14 for his first claim.
15	Hauptmann Kurt Fladrich	9./NJG 4	One Lancaster	Claimed a Lancaster north-east of Cambridge for his 16th claim.
16	Hauptmann Franz Brinkhaus	I./NJG 3	One four engine bomber	Claimed a Lockheed Hudson north of Cambridge for his 13th victory.
17–18	Hauptmann Gerhard Raht	I./NJG 3	Two four engine bombers	Claimed bombers at 01:04 and 01:26 for his 52–53rd victories.

=== British losses ===
British records list the loss of 15 Handley Page Halifax and 12 Avro Lancaster four-engine bombers which made up the vast majority of casualties. Two Mosquitos were lost, one of which presumably fell in combat. Nine aircraft were listed as damaged.
Airframe damaged
Airframe severely damaged
Airframe destroyed

Loss no. (time)	Type	Serial	Sqn	Notes
1. (00.08)	B-17 II	KH114	214 Squadron	Pilot Flight Sergeant (F/Sgt) R. V Kingdon and crew safe. Landed at Woodbridge
2. (00:10)	Mosquito XIX	MM640	169 Squadron	Presumably shot down near RAF Coltishall, returning from a bomber support sortie to Kamen. Crashed at Buxton, Norfolk. Squadron Leader V.J Fenwick and Flying Officer (F/O) J.W Pierce killed.
3. (00:16)	B-17 III	HB815	214 Squadron	Crashed at Lodge Farm, Suffolk. F/O Bennett, F/Sgts H. Barnfield, F. Hares, L.A Hadder, P.J Healy, Sergeant (Sgt) L.E Billington killed. F/Sgt W. Briddon, A. McDermid, Warrant Officer (W/O) R.W Church and L.J Odgers safe.
4. (00:19)	B-17	HB802	214 Squadron	Attacked over Peterborough, landed at Brawdy.
5. (00:20)	Halifax	NP931	640 Squadron	Crashed short of Woodbridge airfield. P/O P.B.Manton (Pilot), F/Sgt C.E.Cox (Flt Engr), F/S K.F.Stocker (Navigator), Sgt E.R.Knowles (Bomb Aimer), F/S J.H.Law (WOp AG) killed. Sgt J.P.Pridding (MidUp AG), Sgt E.J.V.Thompson (Rear AG) injured.
6. (00:25)	Halifax	NA107	171 Squadron	Crashed at South Lopham, Norfolk. Squadron Leader P.C Proctor, W/O A. P Richards, F/O W. Braithwaite, Flight Lieutenant (F/Lt) E.V Stephenson all injured, F/O B.T Twinn, F/Lt N.G Errington, F/Sgt H. Laking, F/O W.G Hayden, baled out.
7. (00:29)	Lancaster	PB476	12 Squadron	Crashed at Alford, Lincolnshire. P/O Ansdell, F/O Hunter, Heath, Sgt Shaffer, Parry, Walker and Mellor killed.
8. (00:30)	Halifax	PM437	158 Squadron	Crashed north of Driffield, Yorkshire. F/Lt C.A Rodgers, F/O D.J Harris, F/Sgt R.H Houdley, J. W Middleton, Sgt J.J.E Dent, E.A.J Fanrow, P/O C.J.W Muir all killed.
9. (00:40)	Halifax	NR250	466 Squadron RAAF	Crew baled out over Waddington, aircraft crashed at Friskney, near Skegness. No injuries.
10. (00:51)	Halifax	MZ917	158 Squadron	Landed at Lissett. Sgt Tait injured, no further injuries.
11. (00:57)	Lancaster	PB118	1654 CU	Crashed near Nottinghamshire. F/Sgt R.W Pinkstone, H. Evans, J. Pringle and J.S. Morgan baled out injured. Sgt C.G Rouse and J.F Morgan baled out safely, Sgt R. Campbell killed.
12. (00:59)	Halifax	LV255	192 Squadron	F/O E.D Roberts, Sgt K.A Sutcliffe seriously injured. F/O R.G Todd baled out injured. F/O W. Darlington, W/O W.S Clementson, Sgt J.C Anderson, F/Sgt R.G Holmes and Sgt R. T Grapes.
13. (01:00)	Lancaster	NG502	460 Squadron RAAF	F/O W.B Warren, F/Sgt F.D Kelly safe. F/O S.R Gannon, F/Lt G.R Grinter, F/O R.J Jackson injured. F/Sgt R.E Davey and Sgt A. Streatfield killed.
14. (01:02)	Lancaster	PB708	1650 CU	W/O Kann baled, aircraft landed at High Ercall after being attacked.
15. (01:05)	Lancaster	PD444	1662 CU	Attacked over Doncaster but landed safely.
16. (01:05)	Lancaster	LM748	1654 CU	Crashed into the ground near Newark, Nottinghamshire. F/Sgt A.E Lutz, F. Shaw, H.F Cox, A.G Davy, F/O J.A.C Chapman, Sgt A.F Wawby and Sgt H. Frost killed in action.
17. (01:10)	Halifax	MZ654	1664 CU	Sgt E.P Mangin, A.K Ballantyne, J. Wilson baled out. F/O W.E. McQuestion and F/O R.P Maitland stayed in the aircraft and landed safely.
18. (01:12)	Halifax	NA162	1664 CU	Crashed in flames at Brafferton, Yorkshire. P/O K.W Griffey, Sgt J.W Buttrey, F/O G. Lloyd, W/O L.T Chevier, Sgt S. Forster, L. Boardman and J.E Fielder killed.
19. (01:12)	Halifax	NR179	466 Squadron RAAF	Crashed near Fridaythorpe. F/O A.P Shelton, F/Sgt R.P Johnson, F/Sgt G.N Dixon were killed on impact. F/Sgt V. Bullen, F/Sgt P J Hogan and F/Sgt G. Lain baled out successfully near Sutton on Derwent. F/Sgt W Welsh baled out but died on landing due to insufficient jump height.
20. (01:15)	Halifax	NR235	347 Squadron	Squadron Leader J. Terrien killed. Lieutenant (Lt) R. Mosnier, Lt R. Micheldon, F/Sgt C. Dugardin, G. Puthier, Sgt, A. Dunand, Sgt R. Delaroche baled out.
21. (1:05)	Halifax	NA860	347 Squadron	Captain Laucou and Sgt Le Masson killed. Lt Giroud, L. Viel, Sgt C. Pochont, P. Charriere and Hemery baled out.
22. (01:10)	Lancaster	ME323	12 Squadron	F/O Thomas, F/Sgt Horstman, Davis, McCaffery, pridmore, Cryer, Weston killed.
23. (01:15)	Lancaster	ND387	1651 CU	F/Sgt Howard, Darling, Pullan, F/O Millar, Wilson, Sgt Taylor killed Sgt Thompson injured.
24. (01:15)	Lancaster	ME442	44 Squadron	F/O J.J Ryan, Sgt T.H Jarman, R.R Russell, A.J Terry, H. Birch, H. Payne, W.H Rogan killed.
25. (01:18)	Lancaster	NG325	189 Squadron	Crashed near Rudham Railway Station. F/O S.J Reid, Sgt F.N Benson, R.W McCormack, J.T Nelson, M.R Bullock, H.G Harrison and F/Sgt G. F. Caley killed.
26. (01:35)	Lancaster	JB699	1651 CU	Crashed at Cottesmore Airfield Leicestershire. F/Lt Baum, F/O Davies, Sgt Smith, Warne, Gardener, Brook, Platt killed.
27. (01:36)	Halifax	MZ860	76 Squadron	Crashed in flames at Cadney Brigg, Lincolnshire. P/O H. Bertenshaw, F/Sgt D. Skilton, G.F French, Sgt Shearman, H. Sporne baled out safely.
28. (01:45)	Halifax	HX322	10 Squadron	Crashed near Spellow Hill, Knaresborough, Yorkshire. F/Lt Laffoley, P/O Thorneycroft, F/Sgt P. Field, Bradshaw, C.H Finch killed. P/O W. Kay, P/O K.H.V Palmer, F/Sgt S. Hamilton safe.
29. (02:09)	Halifax	NR229	346 Squadron	Crashed at Hurworth, near Croft, Yorkshire. Captain Notelle, Lt Boissey, Lt. Flous, Sgt Malia, uninjured. Lt Martin, Sgt Santoni and Sgt Neri safe.
30. (—)	Hudson	—	161 Squadron	F/O Regan and crew safe, landed at Feltwell.
31. (—)	Lancaster	NR210	77 Squadron	Damaged but landed safely. F/Sgt H. Mustoe injured, F/O J.M. Geddes landed the aircraft.
32 (—)	Halifax	NR240	158 Squadron	Damaged but landed safely at Middleton. F/Sgt H. Mustoe injured, F/O J.M. Geddes landed the aircraft.
33. (03:59)	Mosquito	NT357	68 Squadron	Crashed at Horstead Hall after engine failure. F/O Aust and Halestrap killed.

=== German losses ===
At the time of Gisela, the Ju 88 was the only fighter available in the necessary numbers, with the required range, to reach eastern England and return. As a consequence, all German losses were Ju 88s. Below is a list of German losses during the operation.
Airframe damaged
Airframe severely damaged
Airframe destroyed

Loss no.	Aircraft type	Aircraft details	Squadron	Details of crew and fate
1.	Junkers Ju 88G-6	Werknummer 620588, 4R+JL	3./NJG 2	Fahnrich (Fhr) K. Vogel, Feldwebel (Fw) J. Fritsch, Unteroffizier (Uffz) H. Hellmich and Uffz A. Engelhardt missing in action presumed dead.
2.	Junkers Ju 88G-6	Werknummer 620644, 4R+CL	3./NJG 2	Uffz Artur Schlichter, Obergefreiter (OGefr) Robert Kautz, Fw Kolbe and Ogrefr R. Theimer baled out. Aircraft ran out of fuel. A German source states Schlichter and Krautz did not survive. It also lists the Ju 88 as Werknummer 620654. According to another German source the Ju 88 fell to an enemy aircraft. It also corroborates the deaths of Krautz and Schlichter.
3.	Junkers Ju 88G-6	Werknummer 620192	I./NJG 2	Fw J. Wyleciol, Fw K. Thomann, Uffz G. Pfauter, and Uffz E. Schnitzer killed in action.
4.	Junkers Ju 88G-6	Werknummer 710580	I./NJG 2	25% Damaged, crew safe.
5.	Junkers Ju 88G-6	Werknummer 622474	I./NJG 2	25% Damaged, crew safe.
6.	Junkers Ju 88G-6	Werknummer 622154	I./NJG 2	Crashed, crew safe.
7.	Junkers Ju 88G-6	Werknummer 622140, 4R+LT	9./NJG 2	Fw H. Schenk, Uffz H. Kunst, Ogefr F. Habermalz and Uffz F. Däuber killed in action.
8.	Junkers Ju 88G-6	Werknummer 622822	III./NJG 3	25% damaged. Ogefr. Kurt Röder injured rest of crew safe.
9.	Junkers Ju 88G-6	Werknummer 6222(sic)	II./NJG 3	35% damaged in forced landing. Crew safe.
10.	Junkers Ju 88G-6	Werknummer 621821	III./NJG 3	Crashed after being hit by ground-fire. Lt Hans Flach, Uffz Gottfried Nass, Fw Karl Huber and Fw Franz Fleischer injured.
11.	Junkers Ju 88G-6	Werknummer 620785	IV./NJG 3	Crashed during meteorological flight. Uffz L. Kowalski, Ogefr M. Komatz killed. Fw Franz Fleischer injured.
12.	Junkers Ju 88G-7	Werknummer 0018	IV./NJG 3	Failed to return, presumed lost over the North Sea. Oberfeldwebel (Ofw) W. John, Fw L. Dunst, Ogefr A. Gerhard, Ogefr W. Krause all missing in action.
13.	Junkers Ju 88G-6	Werknummer 621293	IV./NJG 3	Failed to return, presumed lost over the North Sea. Uffz W. Lohse, Uffz H. Horsch and Ogefr F. Neumann missing in action.
14.	Junkers Ju 88G-6	Werknummer 620745, D5+AE	IV./NJG 3	Crew baled out after aircraft ran out of fuel. Gruppenkommandeur, and Major Bertold Ney, Fw W. Bolenz injured. Ofw Schlick safe. Ney broke his back after bailing out. He remained bed-bound for 51 years, dying in 1996.
15.	Junkers Ju 88G-6	Werknummer 620028, D5+AE	13./NJG 3	Crashed at Sutton, Derwent, near Elvington, Yorkshire. Staffelkapitän, and Hauptmann (Hptm) Johann Dreher, Fw Gustav Schmitz, Ofw Hugo Böker, Fw Martin Bechter killed. Buried at Cannock Chase German war cemetery.
16.	Junkers Ju 88G-6	Werknummer 622829, 3C+EK	2./NJG 4	Crashed after running out of fuel. Three crew baled out, Lt W. Rinker injured.
17.	Junkers Ju 88G-6	Werknummer 621305, 3C+FL	3./NJG 4	Crashed after two crew baled out near Hardenberg. Lt H. Emsinger killed.
18.	Junkers Ju 88G-6	Werknummer 622056, 3C+BC	I./NJG 4	30% damaged in combat. Ofw Friedrich Specht wounded, Otto Zinn and Hauptmann Hans Krause unhurt. It the belief of one German source the Ju 88 fell victim to a Mosquito.
19.	Junkers Ju 88G-6	Werknummer 622959	I./NJG 4	Crew baled out owing to fuel exhaustion. Crew safe.
20.	Junkers Ju 88G-6	Werknummer 622132	I./NJG 4	Crew baled out owing to fuel exhaustion. Ofw K. Gabler injured, rest of crew safe.
21.	Junkers Ju 88G-6	Werknummer 620976	II./NJG 4	25% damage in collision with Werknummer 621072. Crew safe.
22.	Junkers Ju 88G-6	Werknummer 621072	II./NJG 4	15% damage in collision with Werknummer 620976. Crew safe.
23.	Junkers Ju 88G-6	Werknummer 62805, 3C+KN	5./NJG 4	Flew into the ground near Metfield, Suffolk. Ofw Leo Zimmermann, Ofw Paul Vey, Uffz Heinz Pitan, Uffz Hans Wende killed.
24.	Junkers Ju 88G-6	Werknummer 710839	II./NJG 4	25% damaged in crash-landing. Crew safe.
25.	Junkers Ju 88G-6	Werknummer 621792, 3C+DS	8./NJG 4	Failed to return. Oberleutnant W. Paulus, Ogefr E. Hafels and Ogefr H. Müller, missing in action presumed dead. Body of Ogefr A. Hörger washed ashore.
26.	Junkers Ju 88G-1	Werknummer 712203	III./NJG 4	Crashed near Giessen. Ogefr Hermann Hangs missing, rest of crew not known.
27.	Junkers Ju 88G-7	Werknummer 710438	III./NJG 4	Sustained 75% damage in forced landing. Crew safe.
28.	Junkers Ju 88G-1	Werknummer 712405	III./NJG 4	10% damaged at Vechta. Crew safe.
29.	Junkers Ju 88G-6	Werknummer 620397, C9+RR	7./NJG 5	Flew into the ground near Welton, Lincolnshire. Fw Heinrich Conze, Uffz Rudolf Scherer, Ogefr Werner Nollau and Uffz Alfred Altenkirch killed, after destroying 460 Squadron RAAF Lancaster NG502 near Langworth. The German crew were buried at Scampton. Royal Observer Corps member and Special Constable Jack Perotti Kelway was killed on the ground when the wreckage of the German aircraft collided with his car.
30.	Junkers Ju 88G-6	Werknummer 620651, C9+CS	9./NJG 5	Failed to return. Probably crashed into the North Sea. Hptm H. Bobsien, Fw F. Dessemeier, Ogefr F. Purth missing. Ofw H. Steinadler killed.
31.	Junkers Ju 88G-1	Werknummer 620512	III./NJG 5	20% damage in mid-air collision. Crew safe.
32.	Junkers Ju 88G-1	Werknummer 621611	III./NJG 5	50% damaged in force landing. Uffz E. Berger injured, rest of crew safe.
33.	Junkers Ju 88G-6	Werknummer 622832	III./NJG 5	Crashed due to fuel shortage. Crew safe.
34.	Junkers Ju 88G-6	Werknummer 620816	III./NJG 5	Crashed due to fuel shortage. Crew safe.

== Aftermath ==
Gisela failed, it did not cause the mass casualties that Schmid hoped for and it did not disrupt British bombing operations. The next night, a small repeat-operation was attempted but had made no impact. The size of the German force was less than a quarter of what Schmid had originally hoped could be mustered. One source referred to Gisela as the swansong of the German night fighter force. During the course of the operation, the last German aircraft to be brought down over British soil crashed.

Some historians have claimed that had German intruder operations been maintained over Britain from 1941, the British night flying training program, which produced the nucleus of the huge bomber force that operated in 1944–1945, could have been halted or disrupted. The decision not to continue intruder operations, in their view, allowed the British to build their bomber force virtually unhindered for over four years. A n effective German intruder campaign might have given the Luftwaffe night fighter defences an unassailable lead in the night war, and may have stopped or diminished the effectiveness of British bombing operations. This omission could be regarded as one of the major errors made by the OKL concerning the air defence of Germany. In the last eight weeks of the war the bombing intensified until British bombing operations were suspended in late April 1945. By this time, most of the German airfields were under threat from Allied ground forces and the mass surrender of the Nachtjagd was taking place.

== Bibliography ==
- Aders, Gebhard (1978). History of the German Night Fighter Force, 1917–1945. London: Janes. ISBN 978-0-354-01247-8.
- Balss, Michael (1999). Deutsche Nachtjagd: Materialverluste in Ausbildung un Einsatz, Ergänzungen zu Personalverlusten in Ausbildung und Einsatz. Zweibrücken, Germany: VDM Heinz Nickel. ISBN 978-3-925480-36-2.
- Boiten, Theo (1997). Nachtjagd: the night fighter versus bomber war over the Third Reich, 1939–45. London: Crowood Press. ISBN 978-1-86126-086-4.
- Boiten, Theo (1999). Night War: Personal Recollections of the Conflict over Europe, 1939–1945. London: Crowood Press. ISBN 978-1-86-126298-1.
- Bowman, Martin (2006). 100 Group (Bomber Support): RAF Bomber Command in World War II. London: Pen & Sword Aviation. ISBN 978-1-84415-418-0.
- Bright, Paul (2005). Air War Over East Yorkshire in World War II. Yorkshire: Flight Recorder. ISBN 978-0-9545605-7-7.
- Cooper, Alan (2013). Bomber over Berlin: The RAF Offensive, November 1943 – March 1944. London: Pen and Sword Books. ISBN 978-1-78159-065-2.
- Connelly, Mark (2001). Reaching for the Stars: A New History of Bomber Command of World War II. Tauris & Co. ISBN 978-1-86-064591-4.
- Chorley, W. R. (1992). RAF Bomber Command Losses of the Second World War: 1945. London: Midland Publishing. ISBN 978-0-90-459792-9.
- Foreman, John; Mathews, Johannes; Parry, Simon (2004). Luftwaffe Night Fighter Claims 1939–1945. Walton on Thames, UK: Red Kite. ISBN 978-0-9538061-4-0.
- Goodrum, Alastair (2005). No Place for Chivalry: RAF Night Fighters Defend the East of England Against the German Air Force in Two World Wars. London: Grub Street. ISBN 978-1-904943-22-8.
- Held, Werner; Nauroth, Holger (2006). Die Deutsche Nachtjagd: Bildchronik der deutschen Nachtjäger bis 1945 (in German). Würzburg: Verlagshaus GmbH. ISBN 978-3-88189-586-6.
- Hinchliffe, Peter (1999). Schnaufer: Ace of Diamonds. Brimscombe Port, UK: Tempus. ISBN 978-0-7524-1690-8.
- Hooton, E. R. (1997). Eagle in Flames: The Fall of the Luftwaffe. London: Arms & Armour Press. ISBN 978-1-85409-343-1.
- Mackay, Ron (2010). The Last Blitz: Operation Steinbock, the Luftwaffe's Last Blitz on Britain – January to May 1944. Red Kite. ISBN 978-0-9554735-8-6.
- McLachlan, Ian (2010). Night of the Intruders:First-Hand Accounts Chronicling the Slaughter of Homeward Bound USAAF Mission 311. London: Pen and Sword Books. ISBN 978-1-84884-294-6.
- Murray, Williamson (1983). Strategy for Defeat: The Luftwaffe 1933–1945. Maxwell AFB: Air University Press. ISBN 978-1-58566-010-0.
- National Archives, ed. (2000). The Rise and Fall of the German Air Force, 1933–1945. A&C Black. ISBN 978-1-905615-30-8.
- Norman, Bill (2001). Broken Eagles: Luftwaffe Losses Over Yorkshire, 1939–1945. London: Pen and Sword Books. ISBN 978-0-85052-796-4.
- Parry, Simon (2003). Intruders over Britain: The Luftwaffe Night Fighter Offensive 1940 to 1945. Air Research Publications. ISBN 978-1-87-118716-8.
- Ramsey, Winston (1990). The Blitz Then and Now. Vol. 3. London: After the Battle. ISBN 978-0-900913-58-7.
- Usherwood, Mike (1998). RAF Pocklington and RAF Elvington War Diaries: A Wartime Record of Heavy Bomber Operations. Cheshire: Compaid Graphics. ISBN 978-1-900604-06-2.
- Williams, David (2011). Night Fighters: Hunters of the Reich. London: Spellmount. ISBN 978-0-7524-5961-5.

=== Further reading ===
- Hooton, E. R. (2010). The Luftwaffe: A Study in Air Power, 1933–1945. Classic Publications, London. ISBN 978-1-906537-18-0
- Nauroth, Holger and Held, Werner (1982). The defence of the Reich: Hitler's Nightfighter Planes and Pilots. Arms and Armour. London. ISBN 978-0-85368-414-5
