= Johnen (surname) =

Johnen is the surname of an extended family that originally comes from the region of Aachen in Germany.

== Origin ==
The family name is derived from the name John. The name John in turn is a Hebrew from the homonymous nickname origin Johannes (Heb. "Yahweh has bestowed thy Grace") shows previous name.

The name John gained early in the Christian world wide recognition and dissemination, primarily through John the Baptist, and also by the Apostle and Evangelist John.

== Notable people with the name include ==
- Anna Gisela Johnen (1925–2014), German professor of zoology
- Christian Johnen (1862–1938), German jurist and stenography scientist
- Colette Johnen, French professor of mathematics at the University of Bordeaux
- Dietmar Johnen (born 1965), German politician (Alliance '90 / The Greens)
- Hans Johnen (1940–2013), German professor of mathematics
- Heinz-Gregor Johnen (1933–2012), German entrepreneur
- Hermann-Victor Johnen (born 1955), German entrepreneur, economic historian and visiting professor at the University of Berkeley in California.
- Kurt Johnen (1884–1965), a professor of musicology
- Kurt Johnen (1944), author and professor of German Aesthetics and Communication
- Leo Johnen (1901–1989), German politician (GB / BHE)
- Matthias Joseph Johnen (1817–1906), German priest
- Paul Johnen (1922–2005), German local politician and mayor of the city Monschau from 1966 to 1978.
- Thomas Johnen (born 1964), German theologian and professor of Romance philology
- Wilhelm Johnen (politician) (1902–1980), German politician (CDU) and companion of the first post-world war two Chancellor of Germany Konrad Adenauer
- Wilhelm Johnen (1921–2002), German airforce pilot awarded with the Knight's Cross of the Iron Cross
- Wilhelm Johnen (psychologist), (born 1950), German psychologist and author.
