= Egmont Prinz zur Lippe-Weißenfeld =

German fighter ace and Knight's Cross recipient (1918–1944)

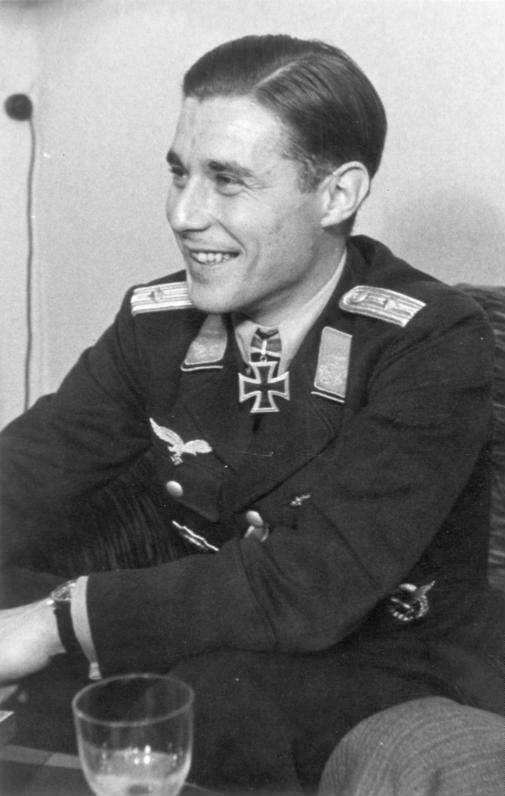
- Egmont Prinz zur Lippe-Weißenfeld
- Born: 14 July 1918; Salzburg, Austria-Hungary
- Died: 12 March 1944 (aged 25) near St. Hubert, German-occupied Belgium
- Burial place: Ysselsteyn German war cemetery, Netherlands
- Military career
- Allegiance: Federal State of Austria; Nazi Germany
- Branch: Luftwaffe
- Service years: 1936–1944
- Rank: Major (major)
- Nickname: Egi
- Units: ZG 76, NJG 1, NJG 2
- Commands: 5./NJG 2, I./NJG 3, III./NJG 1, NJG 5
- Conflicts: World War II: Defense of the Reich †
- Awards: Knight's Cross of the Iron Cross with Oak Leaves

Egmont Prinz zur Lippe-Weißenfeld (14 July 1918 – 12 March 1944) was a Luftwaffe night fighter flying ace of royal descent during World War II. A flying ace or fighter ace is a military aviator credited with shooting down five or more enemy aircraft during aerial combat. Prinz zur Lippe-Weißenfeld was credited with 51 aerial victories, all of them claimed in nocturnal combat missions. (Note: For a list of Luftwaffe night fighter aces see List of German World War II night fighter aces)

Prinz zur Lippe-Weißenfeld was born on 14 July 1918 in Salzburg, Austria and joined the infantry of the Austrian Bundesheer in 1936. He transferred to the emerging Luftwaffe, initially serving as a reconnaissance pilot in the Zerstörergeschwader 76 (ZG 76), before he transferred to the night fighter force. He claimed his first aerial victory on the night of 16 to 17 November 1940. By the end of March, he had accumulated 21 aerial victories for which he was awarded the Knight's Cross of the Iron Cross on 16 April 1942. He received the Knight's Cross of the Iron Cross with Oak Leaves on 2 August 1943, for 45 aerial victories. He was promoted to Major and tasked with leading Nachtjagdgeschwader 5 (NJG 5) in January 1944, before he and his crew were killed in a flight accident on 12 March 1944.

== Personal life ==
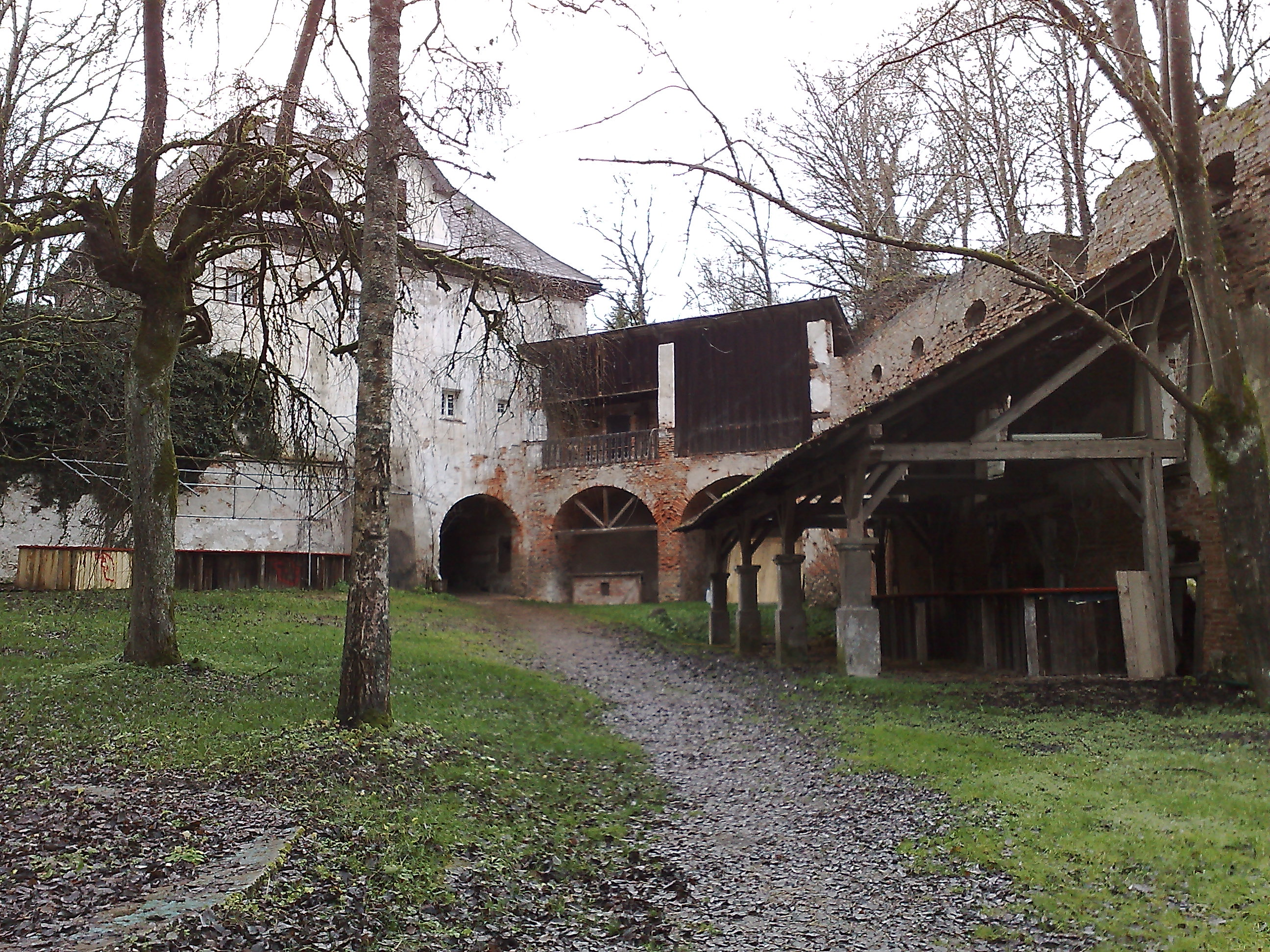
Schloss Alt-Wartenburg

Prince Egmont zur Lippe-Weißenfeld was born on 14 July 1918 in Salzburg, Austro-Hungarian Empire as a member of a cadet branch of the ruling House of Lippe. His father was Prince Alfred of Lippe-Weissenfeld (1881–1960) and his mother was born Countess Anna von Goëß (1895–1972). Egmont was the only son of four children. His sisters Carola, Sophie and Theodora were all younger than Egmont. They lived in an old castle in Upper Austria called Alt Wartenburg, which the family inherited through his mother. At birth he had a remote chance of succeeding to the throne of the Principality of Lippe, a small state within the German Empire. However, only months after his birth, Germany became a republic and all the German royal houses were forced to abdicate.

Prinz zur Lippe-Weißenfeld in his younger years was very enthusiastic about the mountains and wildlife. From his fourteenth year he participated in hunting. At the same time he was also very much interested in music and sports and discovered his love for flying at the Gaisberg near Salzburg. Here he attended the glider flying school of the Austrian Aëro Club. He attended a basic flying course with the second air regiment in Graz and Wiener Neustadt even before he joined the military service.

Prinz zur Lippe-Weißenfeld never married or had children. In January 1941 he became acquainted with Hannelore Ide, nicknamed Idelein. She was a secretary for a Luftgau. The two shared a close relationship and spent as much time together as the war permitted, listening to music and sailing on the IJsselmeer until his death in 1944.

== Military service ==
Prinz zur Lippe-Weißenfeld joined the Austrian Bundesheer in 1936 at the age of 18, initially serving in the infantry. In the aftermaths of the 1938 Anschluss, the incorporation of Austria into Greater Germany by Nazi Germany, he transferred to the German Luftwaffe and was promoted to Leutnant in 1939. He had earned his Luftwaffe Pilots Badge on 5 October 1938 and underwent further training at Fürstenfeldbruck, Schleißheim and Vienna-Aspern. His Luftwaffe career started with the II. Gruppe (2nd group) of the Zerstörergeschwader 76 (ZG 76) before he was transferred to the night fighter wing Nachtjagdgeschwader 1 (NJG 1) on 4 August 1940. (Note: For an explanation of the meaning of Luftwaffe unit designation see Organization of the Luftwaffe during World War II.) The unit was based at Gütersloh where he familiarised himself with the methods of the night fighters.

=== Night fighter career ===
A map of part of the Kammhuber Line. The 'belt' and night fighter 'boxes' are shown.

Following the 1939 aerial Battle of the Heligoland Bight, Royal Air Force (RAF) attacks shifted to the cover of darkness, initiating the Defence of the Reich campaign. By mid-1940, Generalmajor (Brigadier General) Josef Kammhuber had established a night air defense system dubbed the Kammhuber Line. It consisted of a series of control sectors equipped with radars and searchlights and an associated night fighter. Each sector named a Himmelbett (canopy bed) would direct the night fighter into visual range with target bombers. In 1941, the Luftwaffe started equipping night fighters with airborne radar such as the Lichtenstein radar. This airborne radar did not come into general use until early 1942.

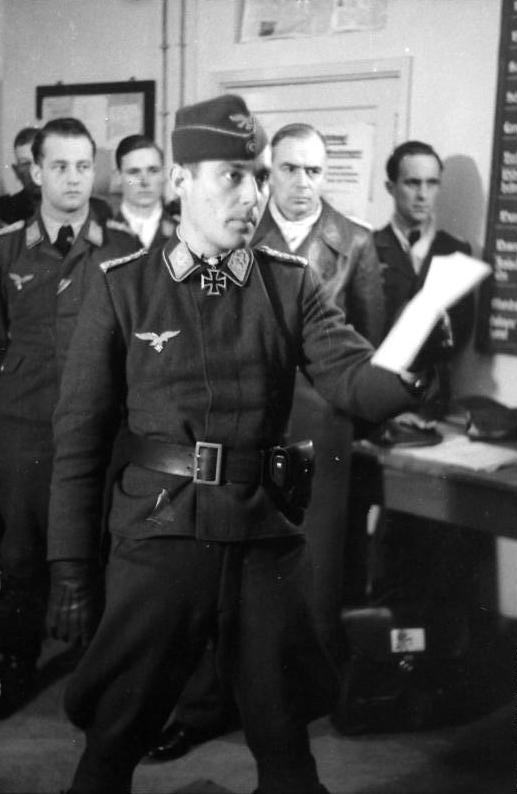
Nightly briefing at the group headquarters

By the summer of 1940, the first night fighters were transferred to Leeuwarden in the Netherlands. Prinz zur Lippe-Weißenfeld was one of the pilots included in this small detachment. As early as 20 October 1940, he had taken over command of an independent night fighter commando at Schiphol and later at Bergen. On his first encounter with the Royal Air Force (RAF) bomber, in the night of 16 to 17 November 1940, he claimed a Vickers Wellington bomber from No. 115 Squadron RAF shot down at 02:05 hours. His second victory was claimed on the night of 15 January 1941, when he shot down an Armstrong Whitworth Whitley N1521 of the Linton-on-Ouse based No. 58 Squadron RAF over the northern Netherlands, near the Dutch coast in the Zwanenwater at a nature reserve at Callantsoog. He was wounded in action on 13 March 1941, while flying Bf 110 D-2 (Werknummer 3376 – factory number) of the 4./NJG 1 with his radio operator Josef Renette when he made an emergency landing at Bergen after their aircraft was hit by the defence fire, wounding them both. Shortly after midnight on 10 April 1941, Prinz zur Lippe-Weißenfeld claimed a No. 12 Squadron RAF Wellington over the IJsselmeer, raising NJG 1's victory score to 100. This achievement was celebrated at the Amstel Hotel in Amsterdam with General Kammhuber, Wolfgang Falck, Werner Streib, Helmut Lent and others attending. On 30 June 1941 while flying Bf 110 C-4 (Werknummer 3273) on a practice intercept mission over North Holland, he collided with Bf 110 C-7 (Werknummer 2075) piloted by Leutnant Rudolf Schoenert of the 4./NJG 1 and crashed near Bergen aan Zee. On 19 June 1941 he earned his first of four references in the daily Wehrmachtbericht, a daily bulletin from the Oberkommando der Wehrmacht (High Command of the Armed Forces). By end July 1941, his number of aerial victory claims stood at eleven. Promoted to Oberleutnant he became Staffelkapitän of the 5th Staffel of Nachtjagdgeschwader 2 (NJG 2—2nd Night Fighter Wing) on 1 November 1941. By the end of 1941, he had claimed a total of 15 aerial victories.

He was awarded the German Cross in Gold (Deutsches Kreuz in Gold) on 25 January 1942 and the Knight's Cross of the Iron Cross (Ritterkreuz des Eisernen Kreuzes) on 16 April 1942 after he had shot down 4 RAF bombers in the night of 26 to 27 March 1942, his score standing at 21 aerial victories. Promoted to Hauptmann, Prinz zur Lippe-Weißenfeld was made Gruppenkommandeur of the I. Gruppe (1st group) of Nachtjagdgeschwader 3 (NJG 3—3rd Night Fighter Wing) on 15 October 1942, where he claimed two further aerial victories. He was transferred again, taking command of the III. Gruppe (3rd group) of NJG 1 on 11 June 1943. One month later he claimed his 45th aerial victory for which he was awarded the Knight's Cross of the Iron Cross with Oak Leaves (Ritterkreuz des Eisernen Kreuzes mit Eichenlaub) on 2 August 1943. The presentation was made by Adolf Hitler at the Wolf's Lair, Hitler's headquarters in Rastenburg, present-day Kętrzyn in Poland on 10/11 August. Five other Luftwaffe officers were presented with awards that day by Hitler, Hauptmann Heinrich Ehrler, Oberleutnant Joachim Kirschner, Hauptmann Manfred Meurer, Hauptmann Werner Schröer, Oberleutnant Theodor Weissenberger were also awarded the Oak Leaves, and Major Helmut Lent received the Swords to his Knight's Cross with Oak Leaves.

=== Wing commander and death ===
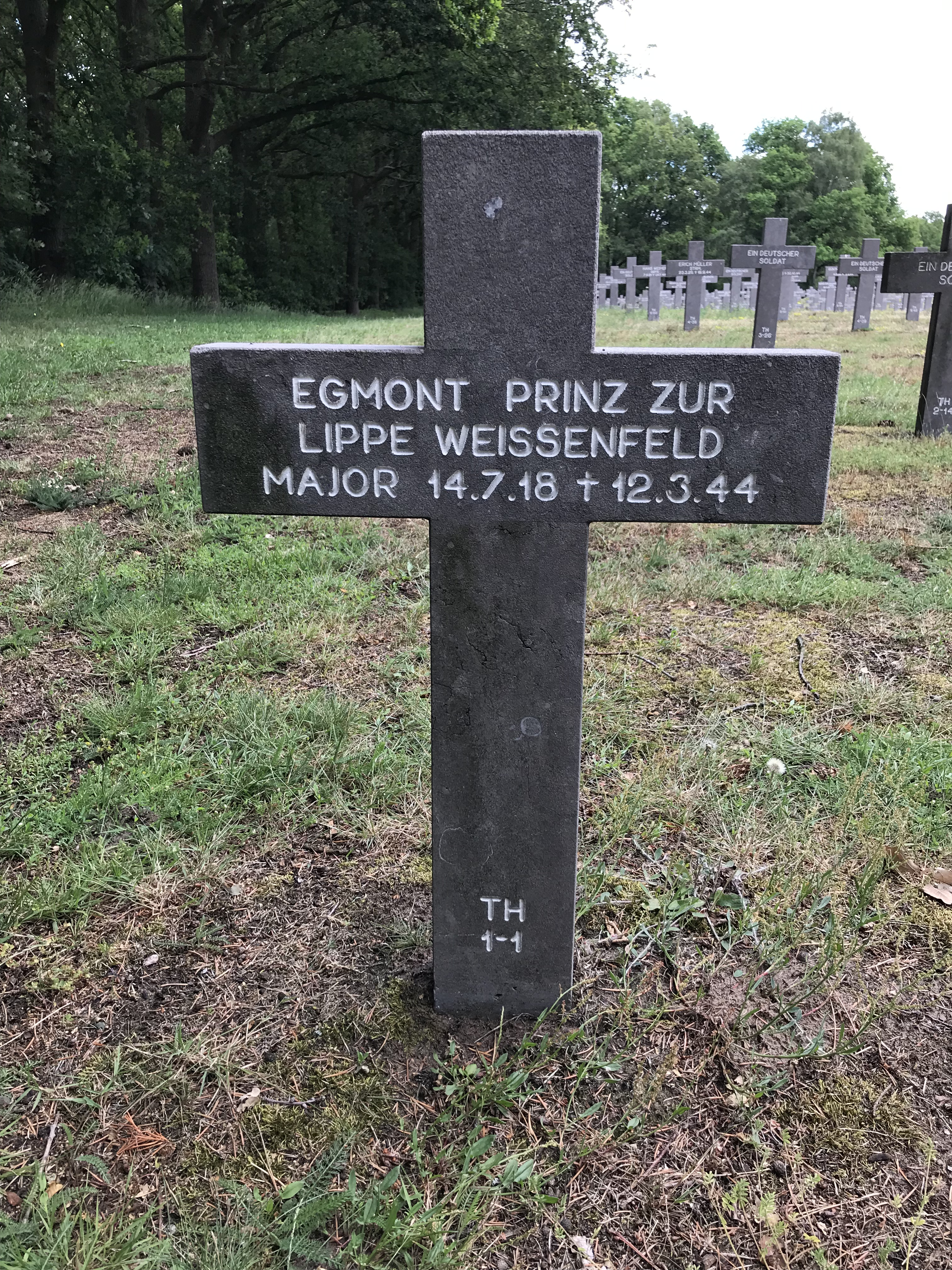
German War Cemetery Ysselsteyn - Egmont Prinz zur Lippe Weissenfeld

After a one-month hospital stay, Prinz zur Lippe-Weißenfeld was promoted to Major and made Geschwaderkommodore of Nachtjagdgeschwader 5 (NJG 5—5th Night Fighter Wing) on 20 February 1944. He and his crew, Oberfeldwebel Josef Renette and Unteroffizier Kurt Röber, were killed in a flying accident on 12 March 1944 on a routine flight from Parchim to Athies-sous-Laon. Above Belgium, they seem to have encountered a bad weather zone with low clouds and a dense snowstorm and it was assumed that the aircraft hit the high Ardennes ground after being forced to fly lower because of ice forming on the wings. The exact circumstances of this flight may never be known, the Bf 110 G-4 C9+CD (Werknummer 720 010—factory number) crashed into the Ardennes mountains near St. Hubert where the completely burned-out wreck was found the following day. The funeral service was held in the city church of Linz on 15 March 1944. Prinz Egmont zur Lippe-Weißenfeld and Prinz Heinrich Prinz zu Sayn-Wittgenstein are buried side by side at Ysselsteyn in the Netherlands.

== Summary of career ==
=== Aerial victory claims ===
According to Obermaier, Prinz zur Lippe-Weißenfeld was credited with 51 nocturnal aerial victories. Foreman, Mathews and Parry, authors of Luftwaffe Night Fighter Claims 1939 – 1945, list 50 nocturnal victory claims, numerically ranging from 1 to 50. His 49th claim is numerically labeled as his 59th victory. Mathews and Foreman also published Luftwaffe Aces — Biographies and Victory Claims, listing Prinz zur Lippe-Weißenfeld with 47 claims, plus four further unconfirmed claims.

Chronicle of aerial victories
This and the – (dash) indicates unconfirmed aerial victory claims for which Prinz zur Lippe-Weißenfeld did not receive credit. This and the ? (question mark) indicates information discrepancies listed in Luftwaffe Night Fighter Claims 1939 – 1945 and in Luftwaffe Aces — Biographies and Victory Claims.
Claim	Date	Time	Type	Location	Serial No./Squadron No.
– 4. Staffel of Nachtjagdgeschwader 1 –
1	17 November 1940	02:05	Wellington	10 km (6.2 mi) west of Medemblik	
2	15 January 1941	22:46	Whitley	5 km (3.1 mi) north of Petten	Whitley N1521/No. 58 Squadron RAF
3	10 April 1941	00:59	Wellington	south of Den Helder	Wellington W5375/No. 12 Squadron RAF
4	9 May 1941	02:48	Wellington	Anna Paulowna	Wellington R1226/No. 214 Squadron RAF
5	11 May 1941	00:20	Stirling	10 km (6.2 mi) southwest of Medemblik	Stirling N3654/No. 15 Squadron RAF
6	13 June 1941	01:10	Whitley	2 km (1.2 mi) north of Medemblik	
7	19 June 1941	00:53	Wellington	west of Enkhuizen	
8	23 June 1941	00:15	Wellington	Insinghuizen	Wellington T2990/No. 311 (Czechoslovak) Squadron RAF
9	14 July 1941	00:28	Wellington	south Medemblik	Wellington R1502/No. 115 Squadron RAF
10	25 July 1941	02:23	Wellington	3 km (1.9 mi) southwest of Medemblik	
11	26 July 1941	03:20	Whitley	11 km (6.8 mi) west of De Kooy	
– 5. Staffel of Nachtjagdgeschwader 2 –
12	8 November 1941	00:41	Whitley	east of Medemblik	
13	8 November 1941	01:20	Wellington	west of Alkmaar	
14	8 November 1941	23:03	Whitley	18 km (11 mi) north of Alkmaar	
15	27 December 1941	23:03	Whitley	1.5 km (0.93 mi) southwest of Petten	
16	24 February 1942	21:45	Hampden	north of Terschelling	Hampden AT194/No. 144 Squadron RAF
17	24 February 1942	22:02	Hampden	north of Terschelling	
18	26 March 1942	22:27	Wellington	near De Kooy	
19	26 March 1942	22:40	Manchester		
20	26 March 1942	22:55	Wellington	north of IJmuiden	
21	26 March 1942	23:16	Wellington	near Edam	
22	4 June 1942	00:50	Wellington	southeast of Vlieland	
23	7 June 1942	01:47	Stirling	west of Terschelling	
24	12 June 1942	03:08	Lancaster	north of Ameland	
25	21 June 1942	01:43	Halifax	25 km (16 mi) northwest of Groningen	
26	21 June 1942	01:45	Wellington	20 km (12 mi) northwest of Groningen	
27	21 June 1942	01:56	Wellington	north of Ameland	
28	26 June 1942	01:05	Wellington	Terschelling	Wellington T2723/No. 20 Operational Training Unit RAF
29	26 June 1942	01:52	Wellington	10 km (6.2 mi) north of Vlieland	Hudson AM794/No. 1 (Coastal) Operational Training Unit RAF
30	30 June 1942	03:08	Wellington	south of Ameland	
31	3 July 1942	00:54	Hampden	south of Koudum	Hampden AT248/No. 420 Squadron RCAF
32	3 July 1942	01:09	Wellington	north of Urk	
33	3 July 1942	03:05	Stirling		
34	20 July 1942	02:52	Halifax	north of Terschelling	
35? (Note: According to Mathews and Foreman, this claim was unconfirmed.)	28 August 1942	01:50	Wellington	PQ 446, over sea	
36	5 September 1942	03:39	Halifax	5 km (3.1 mi) southwest of Leeuwarden	Halifax W1220/No. 103 Squadron RAF
37	23 September 1942	23:36	Wellington	60 km (37 mi) northwest of Vlieland	
– Stab I. Gruppe of Nachtjagdgeschwader 3 –
38	17 January 1943	22:13	Halifax	5 km (3.1 mi) north of Leer	
—? (Note: This unconfirmed claim is not listed by Foreman, Parry and Mathews.)	21/22 January 1943	—	Halifax	north-northwest of Emden	
39	14 May 1943	01:11	Halifax	10 km (6.2 mi) north-northwest of Hengelo	Lancaster ED543/No. 467 Squadron RAAF
– Stab III. Gruppe of Nachtjagdgeschwader 1 –
40	13 June 1943	01:22	Lancaster	3 km (1.9 mi) northwest of Burgsteinfurt	Halifax JB790/No. 408 (Goose) Squadron RCAF
41	13 June 1943	01:34	Lancaster	6 km (3.7 mi) north of Nienberg	Halifax DK177/No. 76 Squadron RAF
42	23 June 1943	02:47	Stirling	2 km (1.2 mi) south of Markelo	Stirling EF399/No. 75 Squadron RNZAF
43?	23 June 1943	02:55	Stirling		
44	30 July 1943	01:40	Lancaster	Hägbluer Holz	
45?	3 August 1943	02:26	Halifax	20 km (12 mi) south of Stade	
46	6 September 1943	00:36	Stirling	7 km (4.3 mi) southeast of Hassloch	Stirling EH931/No. 620 Squadron RAF
47	29 September 1943	21:44	Halifax	7 km (4.3 mi) south of Hengelo	
48	29 September 1943	21:55	Halifax	2 km (1.2 mi) northwest of Legden	
49	16 December 1943	18:50	Lancaster	north of Ahlhorn	Lancaster EE188/No. 9 Squadron RAF
50	16 December 1943	19:00	Lancaster	northwest of Nordhorn	Lancaster JB543/No. 7 Squadron RAF

=== Awards ===
- Front Flying Clasp of the Luftwaffe in Gold
- Iron Cross (1939)
  - 2nd Class (17 December 1940)
  - 1st Class (17 January 1941)
- Wound Badge in Black
- German Cross in Gold on 25 January 1942 as Oberleutnant in the 5./Nachtjagdgeschwader 2
- Knight's Cross of the Iron Cross with Oak Leaves
  - Knight's Cross on 16 April 1942 as Oberleutnant and Staffelkapitän of the 5./Nachtjagdgeschwader 2
  - 263rd Oak Leaves on 2 August 1943 as Hauptmann and Gruppenkommandeur of the III./Nachtjagdgeschwader 1

== Notes ==
Military offices
Preceded by Oberst Günther Radusch	Commander of Nachtjagdgeschwader 5; 20 February 1944 – 12 March 1944	Succeeded by Oberstleutnant Walter Borchers
