= Walter Borchers =

German night fighter ace and wing commander (1916–1945)

- Born: 22 January 1916; Ofen, Ammerland, Grand Duchy of Oldenburg
- Died: 6 March 1945 (aged 29) north of Altenburg
- Cause of death: Killed in action
- Relatives: Adolf Borchers; Hermann Borchers
- Military career
- Allegiance: Nazi Germany
- Branch: Luftwaffe
- Rank: Oberstleutnant (Lieutenant Colonel)
- Units: ZG 76, NJG 1, NJG 2
- Commands: NJG 5
- Conflicts: Defence of the Reich †
- Awards: Knight's Cross of the Iron Cross

Walter Borchers (22 January 1916 – 6 March 1945) was a German Luftwaffe military aviator and wing commander during World War II. As a flying ace, he was credited with 59 aerial victories, including 43 nocturnal victories, 10 as a destroyer pilot and 6 four-engined bombers at day time, claimed in roughly 300 combat missions. Prior to his death he held the position of wing commander of the 5th Night Fighter Wing.

== Biography ==
Walter Borchers was born on 22 January 1916 in Ofen in Ammerland, Duchy of Oldenburg as the third of three brothers, all of whom would be awarded the Knight's Cross of the Iron Cross during the course of World War II. His brother, Major Adolf Borchers received the Knight's Cross on 22 November 1944 as Staffelkapitän of 11./Jagdgeschwader 51 "Mölders". A second brother, SS-Hauptsturmführer Hermann Borchers received the Knight's Cross on 16 October 1944 as commander of the I. Battalion of the SS-Panzergrenadier-Regiment 19.

Borchers was a member of the 5th Staffel (squadron) of Zerstörergeschwader 76 (ZG 76—76th Destroyer Wing) at the outbreak of World War II on 1 September 1939. He became the Staffelkapitän of 5./ZG 76 in the fall of 1940. He claimed 10 aerial victories during the Battle of France and Battle of Britain.

=== Night fighter career ===
A map of part of the Kammhuber Line. The 'belt' and night fighter 'boxes' are shown.

Following the 1939 aerial Battle of the Heligoland Bight, RAF attacks shifted to the cover of darkness, initiating the Defence of the Reich campaign. By mid-1940, Generalmajor (Brigadier General) Josef Kammhuber had established a night air defense system dubbed the Kammhuber Line. It consisted of a series of control sectors equipped with radars and searchlights and an associated night fighter. Each sector named a Himmelbett (canopy bed) would direct the night fighter into visual range with target bombers. In 1941, the Luftwaffe started equipping night fighters with airborne radar such as the Lichtenstein radar. This airborne radar did not come into general use until early 1942.

Borchers' Staffel was transformed to the 8. Staffel of Nachtjagdgeschwader 3 (NJG 3—3rd Night Fighter Wing) in the fall of 1941, flying night fighter missions in Defence of the Reich. Borchers claimed his first nocturnal aerial victory on the night of 3 March 1943. He claimed his 12th and 15th against the United States Army Air Forces (USAAF) heavies—four-engined strategic bombers—in 1943. Still an Oberleutnant, he was made Gruppenkommandeur of the III./Nachtjagdgeschwader 5 (NJG 5—5th Night Fighter Wing) on 22 April 1943, leading the Gruppe (group) until 15 March 1944. In this position he claimed a further six nocturnal victories and four heavy USAAF bombers shot down.

=== Wing commander ===
He was promoted to Major and took command of NJG 5 as Geschwaderkommodore (wing commander) on 15 March, succeeding Egmont Prinz zur Lippe-Weißenfeld. He received the Knight's Cross of the Iron Cross (Ritterkreuz des Eisernen Kreuzes) on 27 July 1944 by which time he had achieved 45 aerial victories in total.

Having claimed an Avro Lancaster, Borchers was shot down and killed in action on the night of 6 March 1945 by a long-range British night fighter north of Altenburg. Flying Junkers Ju 88 G-6 "C9+GA" (Werknummer 622 319—factory number) his air gunner parachuted to safety while his radio operator Leutnant Friedrich Reul was also killed. Borchers had been nominated for the Oak Leaves to the Knight's Cross which he never received. His victors were Wing Commander Walter Gibb and Flying Officer Kendall of No 239 Squadron, Royal Air Force (RAF), part of No. 100 Group RAF, flying a de Havilland Mosquito night fighter.

== Summary of career ==
=== Aerial victory claims ===
According to US historian David T. Zabecki, Borchers was credited with 59 aerial victories. Foreman, Parry and Mathews, authors of Luftwaffe Night Fighter Claims 1939 – 1945, researched the German Federal Archives and found records for 32 nocturnal victory claims. Mathews and Foreman also published Luftwaffe Aces — Biographies and Victory Claims, listing Borchers with additional eleven aerial victories claimed as a Zerstörer pilot.

Victory claims were logged to a map-reference (PQ = Planquadrat), for example "PQ 4317". The Luftwaffe grid map (Jägermeldenetz) covered all of Europe, western Russia and North Africa and was composed of rectangles measuring 15 minutes of latitude by 30 minutes of longitude, an area of about 360 square miles (930 km^{2}). These sectors were then subdivided into 36 smaller units to give a location area 3 km × 4 km (1.9 mi × 2.5 mi) in size.

Chronicle of aerial victories
Claim (total)	Claim (nocturnal)	Date	Time	Type	Location	Serial No./Squadron No.
– 4. Staffel of Zerstörergeschwader 76 –
1		17 May 1940	12:40	M.S.406		
2		29 May 1940	14:00	Spitfire		
3		8 June 1940	17:40	Hawk 75		
4		22 June 1940	17:50	M.S.406		
5		15 August 1940	19:05	Spitfire	south of Salisbury	
6		30 August 1940	12:30	Hurricane		
7		4 September 1940	14:05	Spitfire		
8		4 September 1940	14:10	Spitfire	10 km (6.2 mi) south of London	
9		4 September 1940	14:35	Hurricane	10 km (6.2 mi) south of London	
10		11 September 1940	17:05	Hurricane	south of Portsmouth	
– 5. Staffel of Zerstörergeschwader 76 –
11		20 August 1941	15:35	Spitfire	PQ 4317	
– 8. Staffel of Nachtjagdgeschwader 3 –
12	1	3 March 1943	22:30	Wellington	east of Emden	
– Stab III. Gruppe of Nachtjagdgeschwader 3 –
13	2	18 March 1943	15:45	B-24	Jade Bight; 50–100 km (31–62 mi) northwest of Jade Bight	
14	3	5 April 1943	00:46	Wellington	70 km (43 mi) west of Terschelling	Wellington HE432/428 Ghost Squadron
15	4	17 April 1943	13:45	B-17	PQ 05 Ost 7412	B-17 42-5337/91st Bombardment Group
16	5	24 August 1943	01:14	Stirling	Helenau	
17	6	1 September 1943	00:50	Stirling	south of Berlin	
18	7	4 September 1943	00:45	Lancaster	10 km (6.2 mi) south-southeast of Neuruppin	
19	8	16 December 1943	20:08	Lancaster	10 km (6.2 mi) northeast of Berlin	
20	9	4 January 1944	12:45	B-24		
21	10	5 January 1944	11:50	B-24		
– 7. Staffel of Nachtjagdgeschwader 5 –
22	11	25 May 1944	00:54	four-engined bomber	30 km (19 mi) west of Aachen	
– Stab of Nachtjagdgeschwader 5 –
23	12	8 June 1944	02:21	four-engined bomber	30 km (19 mi) west of Paris	Lancaster LL864/No. 115 Squadron
24	13	8 June 1944	02:29	four-engined bomber	35 km (22 mi) west of Paris	
25	14	8 June 1944	02:31	four-engined bomber	30 km (19 mi) west-southwest of Paris	
26	15	25 June 1944	00:25	four-engined bomber	PQ QD	
27	16	25 June 1944	00:48	four-engined bomber	PQ NB-3	
28	17	5 July 1944	01:50	four-engined bomber	Amiens	
29	18	16 July 1944	01:35	four-engined bomber	Châlons-sur-Marne	
30	19	29 July 1944	01:58	four-engined bomber	northwest of Stuttgart	Lancaster PB172/No. 100 Squadron RAF
31	20	15 October 1944	19:23	PS-84		
32	21	23 October 1944	18:09	DB-3	Eastern Front	
33	22	14/15 January 1945	—	Lancaster	Western Front	
34	23	14/15 January 1945	—	Lancaster	Western Front	
35	24	14/15 January 1945	—	Lancaster	Western Front	
36	25	15/16 January 1945	—	Lancaster	Western Front	
37	26	15/16 January 1945	—	Lancaster	Western Front	
38	27	15/16 January 1945	—	Lancaster	Western Front	
39	28	8/9 February 1945	—	Lancaster	Western Front	
40	29	8/9 February 1945	—	Lancaster	Western Front	
41	30	8/9 February 1945	—	Lancaster	Western Front	
42	31	5/6 March 1945	—	four-engined bomber	Western Front	
43	32	5/6 March 1945	—	four-engined bomber	Western Front	

=== Awards ===
- Iron Cross (1939) 2nd and 1st Class
- German Cross in Gold on 12 July 1943 as Oberleutnant in the 8./Nachtjagdgeschwader 3
- Knight's Cross of the Iron Cross on 27 July 1944 as Major and Gruppenkommandeur of the III./Nachtjagdgeschwader 5.

Military offices
Preceded by Major Egmont Prinz zur Lippe-Weißenfeld	Commander of Nachtjagdgeschwader 5; 15 March 1944 – 5 March 1945	Succeeded by Major Rudolf Schoenert
