= Adolf Borchers =

German World War II fighter pilot (1913–1996)

- Born: 10 February 1913; Wendhausen near Lüneburg
- Died: 9 February 1996 (aged 82); Oberstaufen-Steibis
- Spouse: Christl Cranz
- Relatives: Walter Borchers; Hermann Borchers
- Military career
- Allegiance: Nazi Germany
- Branch: Condor Legion; Luftwaffe
- Rank: Major (major)
- Units: Jagdgruppe 88, JG 51, JG 52
- Commands: 11./JG 51, I./JG 52, III./JG 52
- Conflicts: See battles Spanish Civil War World War II: Invasion of Poland; Battle of France; Battle of Britain; Operation Barbarossa
- Awards: Knight's Cross of the Iron Cross
- Other work: Ski school

Adolf Borchers (10 February 1913 – 9 February 1996) was a Luftwaffe flying ace of World War II. He was credited with 132 aerial victories—that is, 132 aerial combat encounters resulting in the destruction of the enemy aircraft—claimed in approximately 800 combat missions.

== Biography ==
Borchers was born on 10 February 1913 in Wendhausen near Lüneburg. He had two brothers who also received the Knight's Cross. Major Walter Borchers was a night fighter pilot and wing commander. A second brother, SS-Hauptsturmführer Hermann Borchers served in the 9th SS Panzer Division Hohenstaufen.

He joined the Luftwaffe in 1937 and participated as an Unteroffizier in the Spanish Civil War, flying with 1. Staffel of Jagdgruppe 88 (J/88—88th Fighter Group) in the Condor Legion. After the Spanish Civil War he was transferred to 2. Staffel (2nd squadron) of Jagdgeschwader 77 (JG 77—77th Fighter Wing) which later became 10. Staffel of Jagdgeschwader 51 (JG 51—51st Fighter Wing). (Note: For an explanation of the meaning of Luftwaffe unit designation see Organization of the Luftwaffe during World War II.) In this unit he fought in the Invasion of Poland, Battle of France and Battle of Britain, claiming two aerial victories. On 19 May 1940, he claimed his first aerial victory over a Hawker Hurricane in the vicinity of Le Cateau

Following aerial combat on 31 August 1940, Borchers ditched his Messerschmitt Bf 109 E-1 (Werknummer 5808—factory number) in the Thames Estuary but was rescued. That day, I. Gruppe (1st group) of JG 77 lost seven Bf 109s in combat over southeastern England, with one pilot killed in action and five taken prisoner of war. On 21 November 1940, I. Gruppe of JG 77 was officially redesignated and became IV. Gruppe of JG 51.

=== Eastern Front ===
During Operation Barbarossa, the German invasion of the Soviet Union, he accumulated further victories and by the end of 1941 his score had increased to 23 aerial victories. After being promoted to an Officers rank, he was appointed Staffelkapitän (squadron leader) of 11. Staffel of JG 51 on 20 August 1942, replacing Leutnant Wolfgang Böwing-Treuding who was transferred to 10. Staffel. On 15 October, Borchers was awarded the German Cross in Gold (Deutsches Kreuz in Gold) for 31 aerial victories. By the end of 1942, his number of aerial victories had increased to 38.

In early January 1943, IV. Gruppe was based at an airfield named Isotscha, a makeshift airfield built on a frozen lake located approximately 50 kilometers (31 miles) west of Velikiye Luki. In February, the Gruppe converted from the Bf 109 F-2 to the Focke-Wulf Fw 190 A-4. In that combat area, Army Group Centre had launched Operation Büffel, a series of retreats eliminating the Rzhev salient. For 78 aerial victories, Borchers was awarded the Knight's Cross of the Iron Cross (Ritterkreuz des Eisernen Kreuzes) on 22 November. He received the award together with fellow JG 51 pilot Joachim Brendel.

=== Group commander ===
I./JG 52 insignia

On 10 June 1944, I. Gruppe was ordered to an airfield named Poloniczna, a makeshift airfield located approximately 50 kilometers (31 miles) northeast of Lemberg, now Lviv. Seven days later, they were moved to Serpneve. On 11 June, Borchers was appointed Gruppenkommandeur (group commander) of I. Gruppe of Jagdgeschwader 52 (JG 52—52nd Fighter Wing) replacing Hauptmann Johannes Wiese. Wiese had been injured on 22 February. Intermittently, the Gruppe had been led by Oberleutnant Paul-Heinrich Dähne. Command of 11. Staffel of JG 51 was then passed to Oberleutnant Horst Walther. On 22 June, Soviet forces launched Operation Bagration, attacking Army Group Centre in Byelorussia, with the objective of encircling and destroying its main component armies. On 24 June, the Gruppe transferred to Galați and again to Poloniczna. Borchers claimed his 100 aerial victory on 24 July 1944. He was the 86th Luftwaffe pilot to achieve the century mark. The Gruppe reached Grabowiec in eastern Poland on 27 July and Kraków on 1 August. On 12 August they were again relocated and moved to Mzurowa.

His 118th victory claimed on 2 September 1944, is also noted for claiming JG 52 10,000th aerial victory. On 19 September, Borchers made an emergency landing in his Bf 109 G-6 near Tarnów, in an area approximately 70 kilometers (43 miles) east of Kraków. Borchers was given command to III. Gruppe of JG 52 on 1 February 1945. He succeeded Hauptmann Wilhelm Batz who was transferred to take command of II. Gruppe of JG 52. Command of I. Gruppe of JG 52 was passed to Hauptmann Erich Hartmann. Together with his comrades he surrendered to U.S. forces only to be turned over to Soviet forces.

=== Later life ===
After World War II, Borchers was released from Soviet captivity in 1950. He then traveled to Steibis, part of Oberstaufen in Oberallgäu, Bavaria. There, he was reunited with his wife Christl Cranz, a former German alpine ski racer whom he had married in 1943. The marriage produced three children. In 1947, Cranz had founded a Ski school for children, which the two then jointly operated. Borchers died on 9 February 1996 in Oberstaufen.

== Summary of career ==
=== Aerial victory claims ===
According to US historian David T. Zabecki, Borchers was credited with 132 aerial victories. Spick also lists Borchers with 132 aerial victories, 127 of which on the Eastern Front and five during the Battle of France and Battle of Britain, claimed in over 800 combat missions. Mathews and Foreman, authors of Luftwaffe Aces — Biographies and Victory Claims, researched the German Federal Archives and also state that Borchers was credited with 132 aerial victories, including two on the Western Front and the others on the Eastern Front.

Victory claims were logged to a map-reference (PQ = Planquadrat), for example "PQ 47764". The Luftwaffe grid map (Jägermeldenetz) covered all of Europe, western Russia and North Africa and was composed of rectangles measuring 15 minutes of latitude by 30 minutes of longitude, an area of about 360 square miles (930 km^{2}). These sectors were then subdivided into 36 smaller units to give a location area 3 km × 4 km (1.9 mi × 2.5 mi) in size.

Chronicle of aerial victories
This and the ? (question mark) indicates information discrepancies listed by Prien, Stemmer, Rodeike, Balke, Bock, Mathews and Foreman.
Claim	Date	Time	Type	Location	Claim	Date	Time	Type	Location
– 1. Staffel of Jagdgeschwader 77 – Battle of France — 10–23 May 1940
1	19 May 1940	16:15	Hurricane	Le Cateau					
– 10. Staffel of Jagdgeschwader 51 – Battle of Britain and on the English Channel — 25 August 1940 – 7 June 1941
2	5 March 1941	14:55	Spitfire	west of Boulogne					
– 10. Staffel of Jagdgeschwader 51 – Operation Barbarossa — 22 June – 5 December 1941
3	24 June 1941	10:28	DB-3		14	27 August 1941	08:55	I-16? (Note: According to Mathews and Foreman claimed as a Mikoyan-Gurevich MiG-3.)	
4	24 June 1941	10:36	DB-3		15	31 August 1941	17:30	I-18 (MiG-1)	
5	30 June 1941	10:45	DB-3		16	3 September 1941	16:15	DB-3	
6	30 June 1941	13:10	DB-3		17	10 October 1941	09:20	Pe-2	
7	30 June 1941	13:50	SB-2		18	12 October 1941	12:45	Douglas DC-3 (PS-84)	
8	4 July 1941	15:17	SB-2		19	12 October 1941	12:46	Douglas DC-3 (PS-84)	
9	5 July 1941	06:50	SB-2		20	13 October 1941	10:20	DB-3	
10	14 July 1941	16:10	ZKB-19? (Note: According to Mathews and Foreman claimed as an Ilyushin DB-3.)		21	17 October 1941	10:45	Pe-2	
11	27 July 1941	15:50	DB-3		22	24 October 1941	07:55	R-3? (Note: According to Mathews and Foreman claimed as an Ilyushin Il-2.)	
12	8 August 1941	15:30	DB-3		23	24 October 1941	11:05	SB-2	
13	26 August 1941	05:25	DB-3						
– 10. Staffel of Jagdgeschwader 51 – Eastern Front — 6 December 1941 – 30 April 1942
24	2 February 1942	10:10	DB-3		26	31 March 1942	17:30	MiG-3	
25	20 March 1942	11:10	I-18 (MiG-1)						
– 10. Staffel of Jagdgeschwader 51 – Eastern Front — 1 May – August 1942
27	10 July 1942	10:05	LaGG-3		28	31 July 1942	17:35	Pe-2	10 km (6.2 mi) north-northeast of Rzhev
– 11. Staffel of Jagdgeschwader 51 – Eastern Front — August 1942 – 3 February 1943
29	24 August 1942	07:50	LaGG-3	PQ 47764; 15 km (9.3 mi) southwest of Zubtsov	37	29 December 1942	09:20	MiG-3	PQ 07673; 15 km (9.3 mi) northeast of Oryol
30	2 September 1942	07:05	Il-2	northwest of Rzhev	38	29 December 1942	09:40	Il-2	PQ 07722
31	3 September 1942	09:45	Il-2	northwest of Rzhev	39	5 January 1943	08:40	Il-2	PQ 07722
32	4 December 1942	13:40	Il-2	15 km (9.3 mi) north of Velikiye Luki	40	6 January 1943	10:35	Pe-2	PQ 07733
33	4 December 1942	13:45	Il-2	30 km (19 mi) northeast of Morosolshiki	41	14 January 1943	10:25	MiG-3	PQ 07594 vicinity of Glazunovka
34	14 December 1942	09:03	Il-2	10 km (6.2 mi) north of Velikiye Luki	42	16 January 1943	14:45	Il-2	PQ 07352
35	16 December 1942	11:42	Il-2	40 km (25 mi) northeast of Nevel	43	28 January 1943	10:45	MiG-3	PQ 07754 vicinity of Velikiye Luki
36	16 December 1942	11:46	Il-2	40 km (25 mi) northeast of Nevel					
– 11. Staffel of Jagdgeschwader 51 – Eastern Front — 4 February – 31 December 1943
44	6 May 1943	13:10	Il-2	PQ 35 Ost 63164; 10 km (6.2 mi) northeast of Oryol	63	13 July 1943	13:40	Il-2 m.H. (Note: The "m.H." refers to an Ilyushin Il-2 with rear gunner (mit Heckschütze).)	PQ 35 Ost 63252; 15 km (9.3 mi) southeast of Zalegoshch
45	6 May 1943	13:20	Il-2	PQ 35 Ost 63412; 20 km (12 mi) southeast of Zmiyovka	64	13 July 1943	14:10	Il-2 m.H.	PQ 35 Ost 63254; 15 km (9.3 mi) southeast of Zalegoshch
46	6 May 1943	13:40	Il-2	PQ 35 Ost 63471; 15 km (9.3 mi) north of Maloarkhangelsk	65	5 August 1943	17:30	LaGG-3	southwest of Karachev
47	7 May 1943	04:30	MiG-3	PQ 35 Ost 63419; 20 km (12 mi) southeast of Zmiyovka	66	13 August 1943	17:50	LaGG-3	southwest of Kharkiv
48	7 May 1943	04:35	La-5	PQ 35 Ost 63244; 10 km (6.2 mi) south of Zalegoshch	67	16 August 1943	06:05	La-5	south of Merafa
49	7 May 1943	04:39	Il-2	PQ 35 Ost 64832; 20 km (12 mi) east-southeast of Mzensk	68	16 August 1943	13:40	Pe-2	east of Kasstschaja-Logan
50	2 June 1943	04:03	LaGG-3	PQ 35 Ost 63843; 5 km (3.1 mi) southeast of Zolotukhino	69	18 August 1943	06:02	La-5	PQ 35 Ost 70793, southeast of Izium
51	8 June 1943	19:17	Il-2	PQ 35 Ost 54832; 20 km (12 mi) southwest of Telchje	70	18 August 1943	06:10	La-5	PQ 34 Ost 79213, north of Slawjansk
52	8 June 1943	19:22	Il-2	PQ 35 Ost 64772; 15 km (9.3 mi) south of Telchje	71	22 August 1943	17:40	La-5	east of Merefa
53	14 June 1943	03:20	La-5	PQ 35 Ost 63264; 25 km (16 mi) east-southeast of Zalegoshch	72	2 September 1943	15:45	P-40	west of Yelnya
54	5 July 1943	15:35	La-5	PQ 35 Ost 63364; 10 km (6.2 mi) southeast of Glazunowka	73	20 September 1943	13:35	Il-2 m.H.	west of Ssinelnikowo
55	6 July 1943	07:45	La-5	PQ 35 Ost 63183 vicinity of Zmiyovka	74	27 September 1943	09:58	Il-2 m.H.	southwest of Molochansk
56	7 July 1943	03:50	LaGG-3	PQ 35 Ost 63349; 10 km (6.2 mi) south-southeast of Trosna	75	27 October 1943	07:45	La-5	northeast of Kriwoy-Rog
57	8 July 1943	13:35	La-5	PQ 35 Ost 63551; 15 km (9.3 mi) west of Maloarkhangelsk	76	28 October 1943	07:10	P-39	southeast of Nowo-Starodub
58	8 July 1943	13:40	La-5	PQ 35 Ost 63611; 5 km (3.1 mi) northeast of Maloarkhangelsk	77	29 October 1943	07:02	P-39	southwest of Selanoje
59	9 July 1943	08:43	La-5	PQ 35 Ost 63583; 20 km (12 mi) southwest of Maloarkhangelsk	78	22 November 1943	09:32	Il-2 m.H.	8 km (5.0 mi) northwest of Annowka
60	10 July 1943	10:35	La-5	PQ 35 Ost 63554; 15 km (9.3 mi) west of Maloarkhangelsk	79	29 November 1943	07:32	Il-2	20 km (12 mi) southwest of Kanzeropol
61	11 July 1943	12:30	La-5	PQ 35 Ost 63381; 20 km (12 mi) northwest of Maloarkhangelsk	80	29 November 1943	07:35	Il-2	17 km (11 mi) southwest of Kanzeropol
62	13 July 1943	07:15	Il-2	PQ 35 Ost 64891; 25 km (16 mi) east-northeast of Zalegoshch					
– 11. Staffel of Jagdgeschwader 51 – Eastern Front — March – May 1944
81	7 March 1944	10:34	Yak-9	PQ 35 Ost 05414; 25 km (16 mi) north-northeast of Orsha	85	5 May 1944	18:40	Yak-9	PQ 25 Ost 50478 vicinity of Ternopil
82	7 March 1944	10:36	Yak-9	PQ 35 Ost 15311; 25 km (16 mi) northwest of Krassnyj	86? (Note: This claim is not listed by Mathews and Foreman.)	10 May 1944	07:08	R-5	PQ 24 Ost 49424
83	17 April 1944	09:20	Il-2	PQ 25 Ost 51811; 20 km (12 mi) south-southwest of Dubno	87?	10 May 1944	07:09	R-5	PQ 24 Ost 49422
84	2 May 1944	15:30	Yak-9	PQ 25 Ost 40662; 10 km (6.2 mi) south of Berezhany	88	28 May 1944	06:32	La-5	PQ 25 Ost 50563; 20 km (12 mi) south-southwest of Ternopil
– Stab I. Gruppe of Jagdgeschwader 52 – Eastern Front — July – October 1944
89	5 July 1944	12:23	R-5	PQ 25 Ost 51751; 10 km (6.2 mi) northeast of Brody	106	26 August 1944	13:27	Il-2	PQ 25 Ost 11335; 15 km (9.3 mi) south of Opatów
90	7 July 1944	13:32	Yak-9	PQ 25 Ost 42859; 10 km (6.2 mi) south of Kovel	107	26 August 1944	13:30	Il-2	PQ 25 Ost 11441; 15 km (9.3 mi) southwest of Sandomierz
? (Note: This claim is not listed by Prien, Stemmer, Balke and Bock.)	14 July 1944	07:54	Yak-9	30 km (19 mi) north of Brody	108	26 August 1944	17:48	Il-2	PQ 25 Ost 11334; 15 km (9.3 mi) south of Opatów
91	14 July 1944	08:05? (Note: According to Mathews and Foreman claimed at 08:06.)	Yak-9	PQ 25 Ost 51548; 30 km (19 mi) north of Brody	109	28 August 1944	12:51	Yak-9	PQ 25 Ost 01296
92	14 July 1944	17:51? (Note: According to Mathews and Foreman claimed at 17:55.)	Yak-9	PQ 25 Ost 50318; 30 km (19 mi) north of Ternopil	110	31 August 1944	14:09	P-39	PQ 25 Ost 11147; 20 km (12 mi) west-northwest of Opatów
93	15 July 1944	11:25	Yak-9	PQ 25 Ost 51711; 15 km (9.3 mi) north of Brody	111	31 August 1944	14:15	Il-2 m.H.	PQ 25 Ost 11313; 25 km (16 mi) southwest of Opatów
94	18 July 1944	19:45	Il-2 m.H.	PQ 25 Ost 50187; 25 km (16 mi) east of Zolochiv	112	31 August 1944	14:16	Il-2 m.H.	PQ 25 Ost 11172; 20 km (12 mi) west of Opatów
95	22 July 1944	09:32	Il-2 m.H.	PQ 25 Ost 40628; 15 km (9.3 mi) west of Berezhany	113	31 August 1944	14:18	Il-2 m.H.	PQ 25 Ost 01283
96	22 July 1944	09:34	Il-2 m.H.	PQ 25 Ost 40631 vicinity of Berezhany	114	1 September 1944	10:07	Il-2 m.H.	PQ 25 Ost 11187; 10 km (6.2 mi) west of Opatów
97	22 July 1944	09:37	Il-2 m.H.	PQ 25 Ost 50379; 15 km (9.3 mi) northeast of Berezhany	115	1 September 1944	10:10	Il-2 m.H.	PQ 25 Ost 11149; 20 km (12 mi) west-northwest of Opatów
98	23 July 1944	09:58	Il-2 m.H.	PQ 25 Ost 40568; 30 km (19 mi) west-southwest of Berezhany	116	2 September 1944	10:02	Il-2 m.H.	PQ 25 Ost 11179; 20 km (12 mi) west of Opatów
99	23 July 1944	10:01	Il-2 m.H.	PQ 25 Ost 40652; 15 km (9.3 mi) southwest of Berezhany	117	2 September 1944	10:04	Yak-9	PQ 25 Ost 11187; 10 km (6.2 mi) west of Opatów
100	24 July 1944	18:32	Pe-2	PQ 25 Ost 30683; 10 km (6.2 mi) west-northwest of Stryi	118	2 September 1944	15:56	Il-2 m.H.	PQ 25 Ost 11332; 15 km (9.3 mi) south of Opatów
101	22 August 1944	13:41	Yak-9	PQ 25 Ost 11336; 15 km (9.3 mi) south of Opatów	119	22 September 1944	11:33	Il-2	
102	22 August 1944	13:45	Il-2	PQ 25 Ost 11414; 15 km (9.3 mi) west of Sandomierz	120	23 September 1944	13:52	La-5	PQ 25 Ost 10633; 25 km (16 mi) southwest of Sanok (Poland)
103	22 August 1944	13:46	Il-2	PQ 25 Ost 11273; 15 km (9.3 mi) east-southeast of Opatów	121	14 October 1944	13:12	Il-2 m.H.	PQ 25 Ost 13156 vicinity of Budsztmihaly
104	24 August 1944	15:24	Il-2 m.H.	PQ 25 Ost 11442; 15 km (9.3 mi) southwest of Sandomierz	122	15 October 1944	13:47	Il-2 m.H.	PQ 25 Ost 13159; 25 km (16 mi) east-southeast of Trepca
105	25 August 1944	17:13	Il-2 m.H.	PQ 25 Ost 11515; 25 km (16 mi) northwest of Mielec	123	26 October 1944	11:15? (Note: According to Mathews and Foreman claimed at 17:55.)	Il-2 m.H.	PQ 25 Ost 25373; 25 km (16 mi) south of Orșova
– Stab III. Gruppe of Jagdgeschwader 52 – Eastern Front — March 1945
126	22 March 1945	—	Pe-2	PQ 71657	127	22 March 1945	—	Pe-2	PQ 71682

=== Awards ===
- Iron Cross (1939) 2nd and 1st Class
- Honor Goblet of the Luftwaffe on 20 October 1941 as Oberfeldwebel in a Jagdgeschwader (Note: According to Obermaier on 13 October 1941.)
- German Cross in Gold on 15 October 1942 as Oberleutnant in the 11./Jagdgeschwader 51
- Knight's Cross of the Iron Cross on 22 November 1943 as Hauptmann and Staffelkapitän of the 11./Jagdgeschwader 51 "Mölders"
