= Heinz Strüning =

German military aviator (1912–1944)

- Strüning as a Leutnant
- Born: 13 January 1912; Neviges, Kingdom of Prussia, German Empire
- Died: 24 December 1944 (aged 32) near Bergisch Gladbach, Free State of Prussia, Nazi Germany
- Cause of death: Killed in action
- Burial place: cemetery Westönnen
- Military career
- Allegiance: Nazi Germany
- Branch: Luftwaffe
- Service years: 1935–1944
- Rank: Hauptmann (captain)
- Units: ZG 26, KG 30, NJG 2, NJG 1
- Conflicts: World War II: Defense of the Reich †
- Awards: Knight's Cross of the Iron Cross with Oak Leaves

Heinz Strüning (13 January 1912 – 24 December 1944) was a German Luftwaffe military aviator during World War II, a night fighter ace credited with 56 nocturnal aerial victories claimed in 280 combat missions. (Note: For a list of Luftwaffe night fighter aces see List of German World War II night fighter aces.)

All of his victories were claimed over the Western Front in Defense of the Reich missions against the Royal Air Force's Bomber Command. He was shot down and killed in action on Christmas Eve, 24 December 1944.

== Early life and career ==
Strüning was born on 13 January 1912 in Neviges, at the time in the Rhine Province of the German Empire. He was the son of electrician Karl Strüning. Following graduation from the Realgymnasium—a secondary school built on the mid-level Realschule—in Langenberg he began his vocational education as a merchant. In March 1935, he joined the Luftwaffe and was trained as a pilot. (Note: Flight training in the Luftwaffe progressed through the levels A1, A2 and B1, B2, referred to as A/B flight training. A training included theoretical and practical training in aerobatics, navigation, long-distance flights and dead-stick landings. The B courses included high-altitude flights, instrument flights, night landings and training to handle the aircraft in difficult situations. For pilots destined to fly multi-engine aircraft, the training was completed with the Luftwaffe Advanced Pilot's Certificate (Erweiterter Luftwaffen-Flugzeugführerschein), also known as the C-Certificate.)

Holding the rank of Unteroffizier, he was posted to 5. Staffel (5th squadron) of Zerstörergeschwader 26 "Horst Wessel" (ZG 26—26th Destroyer Wing), named after the Nazi martyr Horst Wessel, on 2 August 1939. (Note: For an explanation of the meaning of Luftwaffe unit designation see Organisation of the Luftwaffe during World War II.)

== World War II ==
World War II in Europe began on Friday, 1 September 1939, when German forces invaded Poland. Flying with ZG 26, he flew several patrol missions on the Western Front during the Phoney War period. On 9 April 1940, the Wehrmacht launched Operation Weserübung, the German assault on Denmark and Norway. Two days later, Strüning was reassigned to the Zerstörrerstaffel of Kampfgeschwader 30 (KG 30—30th Bomber Wing). Until 9 June, he flew escort missions in support of the German troops at Narvik. For his service in Norway, he was awarded the Iron Cross second Class (Eisernes Kreuz zweiter Klasse) on 15 July 1940. On 1 August 1940, Strüning was promoted to Feldwebel (sergeant).

=== Night fighter career ===
A map of part of the Kammhuber Line. The 'belt' and night fighter 'boxes' are shown.

Following the 1939 aerial Battle of the Heligoland Bight, Royal Air Force (RAF) attacks shifted to the cover of darkness, initiating the Defence of the Reich campaign. By mid-1940, Generalmajor (Brigadier General) Josef Kammhuber had established a night air defense system dubbed the Kammhuber Line. It consisted of a series of control sectors equipped with radars and searchlights and an associated night fighter. Each sector named a Himmelbett (canopy bed) would direct the night fighter into visual range with target bombers. In 1941, the Luftwaffe started equipping night fighters with airborne radar such as the Lichtenstein radar. This airborne radar did not come into general use until early 1942.

In July 1940, elements of (Z)KG 30 were trained and converted to flying night fighter missions. These elements then became the 4. Staffel in the II. Gruppe (2nd group) of the newly created Nachtjagdgeschwader 1 (NJG 1—1st Night Fighter Wing). On 11 September, II. Gruppe of NJG 1 was reassigned and became the I. Gruppe of Nachtjagdgeschwader 2 (NJG 2—2nd Night Fighter Wing), subsequently Strünning became a pilot of 1./NJG 2. Kammhuber had created I./NJG 2 with the idea of utilizing the Junkers Ju 88 C-2 and Dornier Do 17 Z as an offensive weapon, flying long range intruder (Fernnachtjagd) missions into British airspace, attacking RAF airfields. Until October 1941, I. Gruppe operated from the Gilze-Rijen Air Base.

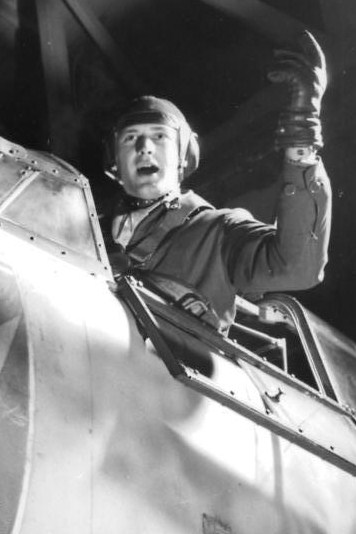
Strüning in his cockpit.

With this unit, Strüning flew 66 intruder missions over England at night, and claimed his first aerial victory on the night of 23 November 1940 over a Vickers Wellington bomber 50 kilometres (31 miles) west of Scheveningen. Two days later, he received the Iron Cross first Class (Eisernes Kreuz erster Klasse). For his service in Norway, he was presented the Narvik Shield on 30 January 1941. On the evening of 15 February 1941, Strüning claimed a Lockheed Hudson 75 km (47 mi) east of Great Yarmouth and a Wellington 65 km (40 mi) east-northeast of Southend-on-Sea. Following his fifth aerial victory, he received the Honour Goblet of the Luftwaffe (Ehrenpokal der Luftwaffe) on 12 June 1941. On 1 July 1941, Strüning was promoted to Oberfeldwebel (Master Sergeant). He claimed his ninth and last intruder aerial victory on 13 October 1941 over a Boeing B-17 Flying Fortress in the vicinity of Upwood over England.

In the timeframe 24 October 1940, the date of I. Gruppe's first aerial victory, to 12 October 1941, the intruder Gruppe claimed approximately 100 RAF aircraft destroyed, additionally further aircraft were damaged as well as RAF ground targets attacked. This came at the expense of 26 aircraft lost. In October 1941, Hitler ordered the intruder operations stopped as he was skeptical of the results. The unit was then ordered to Catania, Sicily in the Mediterranean theater of operations. Strüning however stayed at Gilze-Rijen and was transferred to the Ergänzungsjagdgruppe, a supplementary unit of NJG 2.

In November 1941, he was transferred to 7./NJG 2. With this unit, Strüning gained 15 victories until mid-September 1942. He received the German Cross in Gold (Deutsches Kreuz in Gold) in July 1942, after his 19th claim. In mid September 1942 he was promoted to Leutnant and awarded the Knight's Cross of the Iron Cross (Ritterkreuz des Eisernen Kreuzes) in October 1942. Strüning is then transferred to 2./NJG 1 in May 1943.

=== Staffelkapitän and death ===
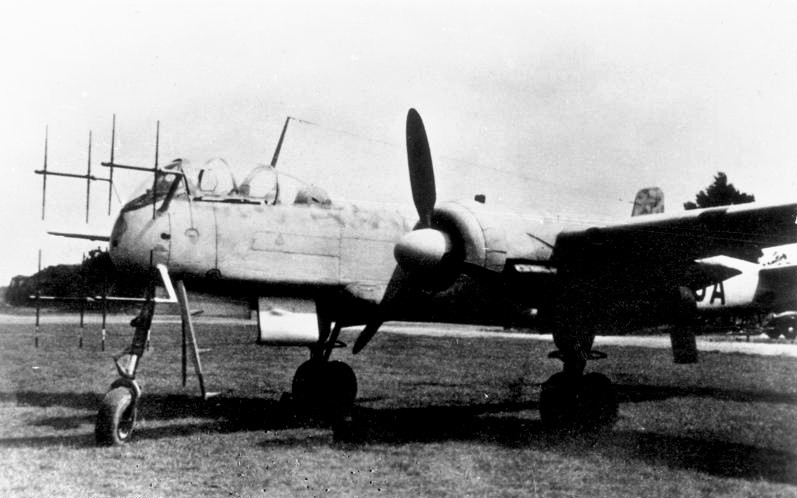
Heinkel He 219

Strüning was promoted to Oberleutnant (first lieutenant) on 1 August 1943. On 15 August, he was then appointed Staffelkapitän of 3. Staffel of Nachtjagdgeschwader 1 (NJG 1—1st Night Fighter Wing). On 23 August 1943, Strüning claimed a Lancaster shot down 20 km (12 mi) east of Eindhoven.

Strüning coordinated the introduction of the new Heinkel He 219 "Uhu". With this aircraft, Strüning downed three bombers on the night of 31 August 1943, a Halifax 20 kilometers (12 miles) west of Mönchengladbach. On 22 June 1944, he shot down three RAF bombers. Strüning was awarded the Knight's Cross of the Iron Cross with Oak Leaves (Ritterkreuz des Eisernen Kreuzes mit Eichenlaub) on 20 July 1944.

On 7 October, Helmut Lent, the Geschwaderkommodore of NJG 3, died of wounds sustained in a flying accident the day before. Lent's state funeral was held in the Reich Chancellery, Berlin, on Wednesday 11 October 1944. Strüning, together with Oberstleutnant Hans-Joachim Jabs, Major Rudolf Schoenert, Oberstleutnant Günther Radusch, Hauptmann Karl Hadeball and Hauptmann Paul Zorner, formed the guard of honor. On 15 November, Strüning again participated in a guard of honor. He and Leutnant Karl Schnörrer, Oberst Gordon Gollob, Major Georg Christl, Major Rudolf Schoenert, Major Josef Fözö formed the guard of honor at Walter Nowotny funeral at the Zentralfriedhof in Vienna. Nowotny had been killed in action on 8 November 1944. The eulogy was delivered by Generaloberst Otto Deßloch.

At about 6 pm on 24 December 1944 his Messerschmitt Bf 110 G-4 (Werknummer 740 162—factory number) G9+CT was shot down by 10-kill ace F/L R.D. Doleman and F/L D.C. Bunch of No. 157 Squadron RAF in a de Havilland Mosquito Intruder while he tried to attack a Lancaster bomber over Cologne. He bailed out but struck the tail of his plane and fell to his death. His body was found two months after his death. Strüning was buried at the Ostfriedhof (eastern cemetery) in Westönnen in field X, grave 14.

== Summary of career ==
=== Aerial victory claims ===
According to US historian David T. Zabecki, Strüning was credited with 56 aerial victories. Foreman, Parry and Mathews, authors of Luftwaffe Night Fighter Claims 1939 – 1945, researched the German Federal Archives and found records for 56 nocturnal victory claims. Mathews and Foreman also published Luftwaffe Aces — Biographies and Victory Claims, listing Strüning with 56 aerial victories claimed in 280 combat missions.

Chronicle of aerial victories
| Claim | Date | Time | Type | Location | Serial No./Squadron No. |
– 1. Staffel of Nachtjagdgeschwader 2 –
| 1 | 23 November 1940 | 18:40 | Wellington | 50 km (31 mi) west of Scheveningen | |
| 2 | 15 February 1941 | 09:15 | Hudson | 75 km (47 mi) east of Great Yarmouth | |
| 3 | 15 February 1941 | 19:58 | Wellington | 65 km (40 mi) east-northeast of Southend-on-Sea | |
| 4 | 7 May 1941 | 02:08 | Wellington | Peterborough | Wellington R3227/No. 11 Operational Training Unit RAF |
| 5 | 9 May 1941 | 23:30 | Wellington | over the North Sea | |
| 6 | 5 July 1941 | 01:57 | Wellington | vicinity of Bircham Newton | |
| 7 | 19 August 1941 | 01:20 | Blenheim | vicinity of Grantham | |
| 8 | 19 August 1941 | 02:00 | Blenheim | vicinity of Grantham | |
| 9 | 13 October 1941 | 22:20 | B-17 | vicinity of Upwood | |
– Ergänzungsjagdgruppe of Nachtjagdgeschwader 2 –
| 10 | 26 January 1942 | 22:35 | Whitley | | |
| 11 | 29 April 1942 | 01:15 | Boston | 5 km (3.1 mi) southeast of Noordschans | |
| 12 | 9 May 1942 | 01:02 | Stirling | | |
| 13 | 20 May 1942 | 00:56 | Stirling | | Stirling DJ977/No. 218 (Gold Coast) Squadron RAF |
| 14 | 31 May 1942 | 00:27 | Boston | | Manchester L7429/No.49 Conversion Flight RAF |
| 15 | 2 June 1942 | 03:10 | B-24 | | |
| 16 | 2 June 1942 | 03:25 | Wellington | | Stirling R9318/No. 15 Squadron RAF |
| 17 | 6 June 1942 | 03:35 | Stirling | | |
| 18 | 20 June 1942 | 03:27 | Wellington | | |
| 19 | 26 June 1942 | 01:13 | B-24 | | |
– 8. Staffel of Nachtjagdgeschwader 2 –
| 20 | 22 July 1942 | 01:45 | Halifax | 14 km (8.7 mi) south of Utrecht | |
| 21 | 26 July 1942 | 02:30 | Wellington | northeast of Amersfoort | |
| 22 | 30 July 1942 | 03:55 | Wellington | | |
| 23 | 10 September 1942 | 22:50 | Wellington | 12 km (7.5 mi) northeast of Helmond | |
| 24 | 16 September 1942 | 23:34 | Wellington | | Stirling DF550/No. 142 Squadron RAF |
– 2. Staffel of Nachtjagdgeschwader 1 –
| 25 | 14 May 1943 | 01:49 | Halifax | 10 km (6.2 mi) north of Breskens | |
| 26 | 14 May 1943 | 02:26 | Halifax | 60 km (37 mi) west of Walcheren | Halifax W7935/No. 102 Squadron RAF |
| 27 | 24 May 1943 | 02:14 | Stirling | 18 km (11 mi) south of Utrecht | Stirling BK783/No. 75 Squadron RAF |
| 28 | 26 May 1943 | 02:33 | Wellington | Loosduinen | Wellington HE228/No. 192 Squadron RAF |
| 29 | 28 May 1943 | 01:54 | Mosquito | 15 km (9.3 mi) southeast of Gouda | |
| 30 | 17 June 1943 | 02:06 | Halifax | 10 km (6.2 mi) northwest of Euddorp | |
| 31 | 22 June 1943 | 02:02 | Lancaster | | Lancaster ED885/No. 156 Squadron RAF |
| 32 | 23 June 1943 | 02:39 | Halifax | 16 km (9.9 mi) east of Utrecht | Halifax DT700/No. 77 Squadron RAF |
| 33 | 25 June 1943 | 02:49 | Lancaster | 30 km (19 mi) west of Schouwen | Lancaster LM327/No. 97 Squadron RAF |
| 34 | 25 June 1943 | 02:56 | Halifax | 20 km (12 mi) west-northwest of Schouwen | Halifax JD250/No. 51 Squadron RAF |
| 35 | 25 June 1943 | 03:02 | Stirling | 25 km (16 mi) west of Schouwen | Stirling BK628/No. 90 Squadron RAF |
– 3. Staffel of Nachtjagdgeschwader 1 –
| 36 | 14 July 1943 | 01:40 | Halifax | Venlo railway station | Halifax BB323/No. 419 Squadron RCAF |
| 37 | 23 August 1943 | 01:43 | Lancaster | 20 km (12 mi) east of Eindhoven | Lancaster ED701/No. 103 Squadron |
| 38 | 31 August 1943 | 03:20 | Halifax | 20 km (12 mi) west of Mönchengladbach | Halifax LK894/No. 434 (Bluenose) Squadron RCAF |
| 39 | 31 August 1943 | 03:45 | Halifax | west of Mönchengladbach | Stirling EH938/No. 75 Squadron RAF |
| 40 | 31 August 1943 | 03:45 | Halifax | 60 km (37 mi) west-southwest of Mönchengladbach | Halifax HR739/No. 158 Squadron RAF |
| 41 | 1 September 1943 | 01:05 | Halifax | Brandenburg | |
| 42 | 25 March 1944 | 00:30 | four-engined bomber | 230° from Dortmund | Lancaster LM471/No. 576 Squadron RAF |
| 43 | 11 May 1944 | 00:15 | Lancaster | 18 km (11 mi) northeast of Bruges | Halifax LV985/No. 427 Squadron RCAF |
| 44 | 13 May 1944 | 00:48 | Halifax | 15 km (9.3 mi) south-southeast of Brussels | Halifax MZ629/No. 431 (Iroquois) Squadron RCAF |
| 45 | 22 May 1944 | 01:32 | Lancaster | north of Fessenhout | Lancaster LL951/No. 460 Squadron RAAF |
| 46 | 23 May 1944 | 01:14 | Lancaster | vicinity of Giessen | |
| 47 | 25 May 1944 | 00:47 | Halifax | vicinity of Leopoldsburg | Halifax HX352/No. 429 Squadron RCAF |
| 48 | 25 May 1944 | 01:15 | Viermot | Off Ostend | |
| 49 | 3 June 1944 | 00:36 | Halifax | Schouwen Island | |
| 50 | 6 June 1944 | 02:30 | Mosquito | Noord Brabant | Mosquito NS950/No. 515 Squadron |
| 51 | 17 June 1944 | 01:07 | four-engined bomber | beacon "Gorilla" (Note: Beacon "Gorilla"—At Schoonrewoerd in 51°55′N 5°6′E) | |
| 52 | 17 June 1944 | 01:13 | four-engined bomber | beacon "Gorilla" | |
| 53 | 22 June 1944 | 01:13 | Lancaster | Venlo | |
| 54 | 22 June 1944 | 01:17 | B-17 | vicinity of Maastricht | B-17 SR382/No. 214 Squadron RAF |
| 55 | 22 June 1944 | 02:30 | four-engined bomber | beacon "Hamster" (Note: Beacon "Hamster"—At Oostkapelle/Domburg in 51°35′N 3°32′E) | |
| 56 | 19 July 1944 | 01:55 | Mosquito | 50 km (31 mi) west of Berlin | Mosquito MM136/No. 571 Squadron RAF |

=== Awards ===
- Iron Cross (1939)
  - 2nd Class (15 July 1940)
  - 1st Class (25 November 1940)
- Narvik Shield (30 January 1941)
- Honour Goblet of the Luftwaffe (Ehrenpokal der Luftwaffe) on 12 June 1941 as Feldwebel in a Nachtjagdgeschwader
- German Cross in Gold on 10 July 1942 as Oberfeldwebel in the Ergänzungsstaffel/Nachtjagdgeschwader 2
- Wound Badge in Black (10 September 1943)
- Front Flying Clasp of the Luftwaffe for Night Fighter in Gold with Pennant (31 May 1944)
- Knight's Cross of the Iron Cross with Oak Leaves
  - Knight's Cross on 29 October 1942 as Leutnant of the Reserves and pilot in the 3./Nachtjagdgeschwader 1 (Note: According to Scherzer as Leutnant (war officer) and pilot in the 8./Nachtjagdgeschwader 2.)
  - 528th Oak Leaves on 20 July 1944 as Hauptmann of the Reserves and Staffelkapitän of the 3./Nachtjagdgeschwader 1 (Note: According to Scherzer as Hauptmann (war officer).)

=== Dates of rank ===
| 1 August 1940: | Feldwebel (Technical Sergeant) |
| 1 July 1941: | Oberfeldwebel (Master Sergeant) |
| 1 August 1942: | Leutnant (Second Lieutenant) |
| 1 August 1943: | Oberleutnant (First Lieutenant) |
| 1 April 1944: | Hauptmann (Captain) |
