= Wilhelm Johnen =

German World War II fighter pilot (1921–2002)

- Born: 9 October 1921; Homberg at the Niederrhein, Germany
- Died: 7 February 2002 (aged 80); Überlingen
- Military career
- Allegiance: Nazi Germany
- Branch: Luftwaffe
- Service years: 1940–1945
- Rank: Hauptmann (captain)
- Units: NJG 1, NJG 5, NJG 6
- Commands: 8./NJG 6
- Conflicts: World War II: Defence of the Reich
- Awards: Knight's Cross of the Iron Cross
- Other work: Engineer

Wilhelm Johnen (9 October 1921 – 7 February 2002) was a German night fighter ace in the Luftwaffe during World War II.

Born in 1921 Johnen joined the Luftwaffe in 1939. In 1941 Johnen joined the German night fighter force (Nachtjagd) and participated in the Defence of the Reich campaign. He achieved his first success on 26 March 1942. Johnen became a night fighter ace on 25 June 1943 after achieving his fifth victory. In March 1944 he was appointed as Staffelkapitän (squadron leader) at the rank of Oberleutnant with his victory total at 18.

In April 1944 Johnen was briefly interned in Switzerland when he force-landed in the country. It caused an international incident but he was repatriated with his crew some days later. Wilhelm Johnen was awarded the Knight's Cross of the Iron Cross on 29 October 1944 for the destruction of 33 Royal Air Force (RAF) bombers. He ended the war with 34 aerial victories, all of these claims were made at night.

After the war Johnen studied engineering and began a construction business. He died in 2002.

== Early life ==
Wilhelm "Wim" Johnen was born on 9 October 1921 in Homberg, near Duisburg.

== World War II ==
Johnen joined the Luftwaffe and was accepted as a Fahnenjunker (Officer candidate). He began his training at Pardubice, Czechoslovakia, with Fliegerausbildungs-Regiment 32. On 1 April 1940 Johnen was promoted to Gefreiter. On 1 June he was promoted to Unteroffizier and he progressed to Fähnrich on 1 September 1940. After infantry training Johnen spent several months practising on single-engine trainers, and qualified for his license on 21 September 1940. On 1 February Johnen was promoted to Oberfähnrich He was subsequently sent to Zeltweg, where C-Schule prepared pilots for operations on multi-engine aircraft. He then received Zerstörer (Destroyer) training on the Messerschmitt Bf 110. By the time of his graduation Johnen was promoted to Leutnant on 1 April 1941. On 18 May 1941 Johnen volunteered for the night fighter arm. After six weeks of blind-flying training, Johnen was transferred to 3 staffel (squadron), Nachtjagdgeschwader 1 (NJG 1—Night Fighter Wing 1), together with his radio/radar operator Gefreiter Albrecht Risop.

=== Night fighter ===
The pair flew his first operational mission on 11 July 1941 during which they intercepted a Wellington but failed to shoot it down. Johnen's first victory came on 26 March 1942. Johnen and Risop intercepted a Vickers Wellington northwest of Wesel, it was part of a force of 104 Wellingtons and 11 Short Stirlings that attacked Essen. Johnen's first victory was probably Wellington X3589, KO-F, from No. 115 Squadron RAF. Sergeant Harry Taylor and his crew were killed. On this mission, Johnen and Risop were also shot down in their Messerschmitt Bf 110D-3 (Werknummer 4224—factory number) "G9+FL", killing Risop. Johnen achieved his second victory against another Wellington at 01:00 on 17 June 1942. The victory was recorded with 2. Staffel.

Johnen remained with 2./NJG 1 but did not achieve a success for over a year. Air Marshal Arthur Harris, Air Officer Commanding (AOC) RAF Bomber Command escalated the air war in 1943 and began a concerted effort to destroy the industrial German Ruhr region. From March to July 1943 RAF Bomber Command began the campaign, dubbed the Battle of the Ruhr. On the night of the 21/22 June 1943 Johnen claimed a Handley-Page Halifax at 01:43 east of Rousendaal (the crew of W1271 http://www.419squadron.com/W1271.html) and a Wellington northwest of Haamstede at 02:33. In the early hours of the 25 June 1943 Johnen claimed another Halifax north of Rosenburg at 01:01. This was Johnen's fifth victory which qualified him as a night fighter ace. On 8 July Johnen was promoted to Oberleutnant.

3./NJG 1 was re-designated 5./NJG 5 (Nachtjagdgeschwader 5 (Night Fighter Wing 5) and formed into I./NJG 5 (I. Gruppe). The organisation was attached to 4. Jagd Division under the command of Rudolf Schoenert. I. III. and IV. Gruppen were formed in February 1943 to complete the Geschwader. With the new unit Johnen achieved his 6th and 7th victory at 01:02 and 01:07 northwest of Berlin. Both RAF bombers were Short Stirlings. The success was achieved against a 710-strong force of bombers. Johnen scrambled with new crew members bordfunker (radar operator) Facius and his bordmechaniker (observer mechanic) Paul Mahle—whose wife lived in Berlin—scrambled to intercept at 23:00. The Berlin anti-aircraft artillery had permission to fire up to 24,000 feet and Johnen was forced to fly through it. Once in the bomber stream. FuG 220 Lichtenstein SN-2 radar failed and the crew were forced to spot the enemy with the naked eye. Johnen achieved his 8th and final victory of the year on 1 September 1943 at 00:58 when he claimed a Lancaster southwest of Berlin.

On 18 November 1943 Harris began his Berlin offensive. Oberleutnant Johnen achieved two victories on the night of the 3 January 1944—matching his most successful night thus far—when he accounted for two Lancasters at 02:56 03:21; both fell southwest of Berlin. On 6 January Johnen claimed a Lancaster near Tutos at 03:27. A solitary claim against a Lancaster on 20 January north northwest of Berlin at 19:36 followed. Johnen filed three claims on the 27 January 1944. A trio of Lancasters were claimed between 20:36 and 21:18 southeast and southwest of Berlin. He achieved this success again on 15 February 1944. At 20:34 southeast of Damgarten Johnen claimed a Lancaster. Another over Kummenerer See at 20:45 and at 21:20 north northwest of Berlin for his 18th victory. Johnen was appointed to the position (not rank) of Staffelkapitän (squadron leader) on 29 March 1944.

=== Internment ===
This series of successes led to his promotion as Staffelkapitan (squadron leader) of 8./Nachtjagdgeschwader 6 (Night Fighter Wing 6). In early April 1944 his unit moved to Mainz under the command of I./NJG 6, southwest of Frankfurt. On 28 April 1944 Johnen downed another Halifax at 01:31 southwest of Strasbourg for his 19th victory. It was part of a force of 322 heavy bombers sent to attack Friedrichshafen. As Johnen closed to attack the bomber—Halifax III ND759 R-Robert from No. 35 Squadron RAF flown by Warrant Officer Bob Peter (RAAF)—he was also hit by return-fire. The bomber landed on Lake Constance in Switzerland and all but one of the crew lived to be interned. Two other German night fighter pilots pursued RAF bombers into Swiss airspace that night and both Josef Kraft and Gerhard Friedrich both filed claims, but returned to base.

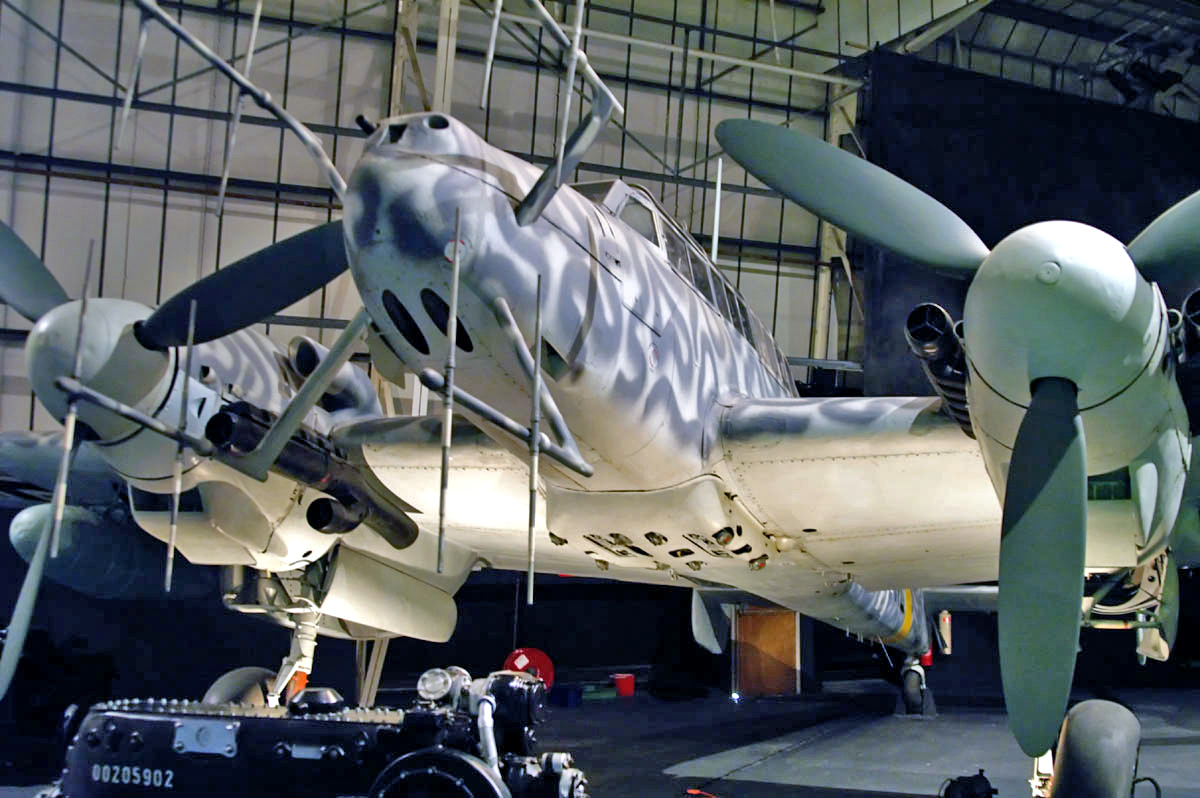
A Bf 110 G-4 night fighter at the RAF Museum in London.

Johnen was also forced to land his damaged Bf 110G-4, C9+EN (Werknummer—Factory Number 740 055), at Zürich-Dubendorf and was captured by personnel of the Swiss Air Force and was interned. During the chase one of the Daimler-Benz DB 605 engines began losing oil and the coolant temperature soared. Johnen feathered the propeller but flew into a searchlight blinded him. He fired a distress flare but lost his bearings. When the flare was deployed the searchlight was momentarily turned off and Johnen headed for an illuminated airfield.

Johnen and his crew, Oberfeldwebel Mahle and Leutnant Kamprath, were interned by Swiss authorities. The damaged night fighter was equipped with a SN-2 Naxos radar set and Schräge Musik armament. Leutnant Kamprath was also II./NJG 5's signals officer and he had all the latest radio codes which he kept in the aircraft against regulations. Oberfeldwebel Mahle had helped develop the Schräge Musik into series production. The Germans were deeply worried about leaving a sophisticatedly equipped night fighter and these important persons in the hands of a foreign government, even if it was a neutral one. The Gestapo arrested the crew's families until it was discovered to be a genuine error. When Adolf Hitler was informed of the incident the next morning he was sure it was treason. Hitler contacted Reichsführer-SS Heinrich Himmler to prepare an operation to destroy the aircraft. Himmler ordered Ernst Kaltenbrunner, Chief of the Reich Security Main Office (Reichssicherheitshauptamt, RSHA) to make the necessary preparation. Kaltenbrunner contacted Otto Skorzeny who planned an attack. He arranged an ad hoc unit at Memmingen and planned to use them to fly into the airbase in a transport from Kampfgeschwader 200 and confiscate or destroy the Bf 110.

Chief of intelligence of the SS(SD) Walter Schellenberg suggested offering the Swiss 12 Messerschmitt Bf 109G-6s and manufacturing rights to them in exchange for the return of the aircraft and the crew. The Swiss had thoroughly examined the Bf 110 but kept this from the Germans. Matters went awry when the German military attaché in Bern heard a rumour that a Luftwaffe officer had already inspected the machine to discover it was false after a check at the Reichsluftwaffenministerium. Hermann Göring, commander-in-chief of the Luftwaffe, immediately suspected it was an enemy agent. In the end, it was agreed that 12 Bf 109G-6 fighters would be sold to Switzerland at 500,000 francs each. In return, the Bf 110 would be blown up in front of German eyewitnesses. Operations Officer Hauptmann Brandt of NJG 6 was selected. He examined the aircraft and noticed one of the SN-2 aerials had been removed and replaced. Brandt initially refused to sign the protocol, but eventually relented on the evening of the 18 May 1944. The Bf 109s arrived the next day and Brandt handed the money to Göring personally on 21 May. The engines of the Bf 109s were all write-offs and Messerschmitt and Daimler-Benz had to pay compensation for this oversight six years later.

=== South Europe ===
8 staffel moved to Hungary. Since the autumn of 1943, the RAF had been flying minelaying operations over the Danube and using the Balkan Air Force to supply partisan operations in Eastern Europe. The British were also attacking oilfields in Romania and operating over the Carpathian Mountains. A handful of German night fighter units were moved there to defend against these incursions. Johnen achieved his first victory in this area on 26 June 1944 at 00:22 southwest of Lake Balaton for his 20th victory. The identity of this claim was probably Wellington X LN748, E, of No. 142 Squadron RAF which failed to return from an operation to Budapest. Flight Sergeant J. W. Scholefield, J. Thompson, Sergeant G. R. McKnight and D. Nelson were killed in action. Only rear gunner, J. Robertson, RCAF, survived. Johnen personally photographed the wreck of the Wellington. Johnen scored is 21st and 22nd victories at 01:17 and 01:25 south of Fels am Wagram in the early hours of the 7 July 1944. German night fighter pilots claimed 15 bombers shot down over Austria on this night.

Johnen achieved eight victories in August 1944. He claimed a B-25 Mitchell on 11 August 1944 at 02:08 and another at 22:59 on 15 August 1944. A third claim against this type was filed on 21 August at 22:42 brought his tally to 25. At 22:23 the following night Johnen claimed a Halifax south of Sombor. On 26/27 August Johnen claimed a Halifax southeast of Baja at 22:00 and a B-25 at 22:30 in an unknown location. In the evening of 27 August, at 21:50 over Friedrichskoog, Wilhelm Johnen claimed his 29th victory against another Halifax. He achieved his 30th victory on 29 August 1944 at 22:12 north of Mohács. Johnen was the only German night fighter pilot to file a claim this night. One B-24, EW165, from 34 Squadron SAAF was lost; Captain John Frederick Munro and his crew were killed and buried in Budapest. In September 1944, Johnen claimed three victories. On 10 September a Halifax was claimed over Szeged at 23:38. Another followed over southeast of Baja, at Madaras at 21:30 on 13 September. Johnen was the only night fighter pilot in the Luftwaffe to claim on the night of 21/22 September 1944, when he claimed a Halifax west of Senta at 20:32.

With his score now standing at 33, Johnen was promoted Hautpmann and awarded the Knight's Cross of the Iron Cross (Ritterkreuz des Eisernen Kreuzes) on 29 October 1944. Johnen was appointed Gruppenkommandeur (group commander) of III. Gruppe of NJG 6, which was based in Germany, in February 1945, succeeding Hauptmann Leopold Fellerer. On the night of the 15/16 March 1945 Johnen shot down his 34th and final bomber, a Lancaster southeast of Würzburg at 02:45.

== After the war ==
After a brief captivity, Johnen settled to Munich and attended university, achieving an engineering degree in construction. He worked for Willi Messerschmitt for a short time, and then started his own company. He also wrote his biography, Duell unter den Sternen—Tatsachenbericht eines deutschen Nachtjägers 1941–1945 (Duel under the Stars—Factual report of a German Night Fighter 1941–1945), one of the first English-written books about the Luftwaffe. Wilhelm Johnen died on 7 February 2002 at Uberlingen, at the age of 81. A new edition of his memoir, published by Greenhill Books, was released in February 2018 with a new introduction by James Holland.

== Summary of career ==
=== Aerial victory claims ===
Foreman, Parry and Mathews, authors of Luftwaffe Night Fighter Claims 1939 – 1945, researched the German Federal Archives and found records for 34 nocturnal victory claims. Mathews and Foreman also published Luftwaffe Aces — Biographies and Victory Claims, listing Johnen with 33 aerial victories, plus one further unconfirmed claim.

Victory claims were logged to a map-reference (PQ = Planquadrat), for example "PQ 24 Ost QB-4". The Luftwaffe grid map (Jägermeldenetz) covered all of Europe, western Russia and North Africa and was composed of rectangles measuring 15 minutes of latitude by 30 minutes of longitude, an area of about 360 square miles (930 km^{2}). These sectors were then subdivided into 36 smaller units to give a location area 3 km × 4 km (1.9 mi × 2.5 mi) in size.

Chronicle of aerial victories
This and the ? (question mark) indicates information discrepancies listed in Luftwaffe Night Fighter Claims 1939 – 1945 and in Luftwaffe Aces — Biographies and Victory Claims.
Claim	Date	Time	Type	Location	Serial No./Squadron No.
– 3. Staffel of Nachtjagdgeschwader 1 –
1	26 March 1942	23:30	Wellington	northwest of Wesel	
– 2. Staffel of Nachtjagdgeschwader 1 –
2	17 June 1942	01:00	Wellington		
3	22 June 1943	01:43	Halifax	5 km (3.1 mi) east of Roosendaal	
4	22 June 1943	02:33	Wellington	northwest of Haamstede	
5	25 June 1943	01:01	Halifax	3 km (1.9 mi) north of Rozenburg	
– 5. Staffel of Nachtjagdgeschwader 5 –
6	24 August 1943	01:02	Stirling	northwest of Berlin	
7	24 August 1943	01:07	Stirling	west-northwest of Berlin	
8	1 September 1943	00:58	Lancaster	20 km (12 mi) southwest of Berlin	
9	3 January 1944	02:56	Lancaster	20 km (12 mi) southwest of Berlin	
10	3 January 1944	03:12? (Note: According to Luftwaffe Aces — Biographies and Victory Claims claimed at 03:16.)	Lancaster	70 km (43 mi) southwest of Berlin	
11? (Note: According to Luftwaffe Aces — Biographies and Victory Claims, this claim was unconfirmed while Luftwaffe Night Fighter Claims 1939 – 1945 confirm this claim.)	6 January 1944	03:27	Lancaster	vicinity of Tutos	
12	20 January 1944	19:36	Lancaster	north-northwest of Berlin	
13	27 January 1944	20:36	Lancaster	south-southeast of Berlin	
14	27 January 1944	20:57	Lancaster	south-southeast of Berlin	
15	27 January 1944	21:18? (Note: According to Luftwaffe Aces — Biographies and Victory Claims claimed at 21:17.)	Lancaster	southwest of Berlin	
16	15 February 1944	20:34	Halifax	southeast of Damgarten	
17	15 February 1944	20:45	Halifax	Lake Kummerow	
18	15 February 1944	21:20	Halifax	north-northwest of Berlin	
– 8. Staffel of Nachtjagdgeschwader 6 –
19	28 April 1944	01:31	Lancaster	30–60 km (19–37 mi) southwest of Strasbourg	
20	26 June 1944	00:22	Wellington	southwest of Lake Balaton	
21	7 July 1944	01:17	Wellington	40 km (25 mi) south of Fels am Wagram; 7 km (4.3 mi) north of Sankt Pölten	
22	7 July 1944	01:25	Wellington	40 km (25 mi) south of Fels am Wagram south of Pyhra	
23	11 August 1944	02:08	B-25	PQ 24 Ost QB-4	
24	15 August 1944	22:59	B-25	beacon "Skorpion" (Note: Beacon "Skorpion"—In Sombor)	
25	21 August 1944	22:42	B-25		
26	22 August 1944	22:23	Halifax	13 km (8.1 mi) south of Sombor	
27	26 August 1944	22:00	Halifax	southeast of Baia	
28	26 August 1944	22:30	B-25		
29	27 August 1944	21:50	Halifax	Friedrichskoog	
30	28 August 1944	22:12	Halifax	north of Mohács	
31	10 September 1944	23:38	Halifax	west of Szeged	
32	13 September 1944	21:30	Halifax	southeast of Baia	
33	21 September 1944	20:32	Halifax	west of Senta	
– Stab III. Staffel of Nachtjagdgeschwader 6 –
34	16 March 1945	02:45	Lancaster	15 km (9.3 mi) southeast of Würzburg	

=== Awards ===
- Honour Goblet of the Luftwaffe (Ehrenpokal der Luftwaffe) on 24 April 1944 as Oberleutnant (Note: According to Obermaier on 20 March 1944.)
- German Cross in Gold on 23 July 1944 as Oberleutnant in the 8./Nachtjagdgeschwader 6
- Knight's Cross of the Iron Cross on 29 October 1944 as Oberleutnant and Staffelkapitän of the 8./Nachtjagdgeschwader 6

== Publications ==
- Duell unter den Sternen—Tatsachenbericht eines deutschen Nachtjägers 1941–1945 [Duel under the Stars—Factual report of a German Night Fighter 1941–1945] (in German). Würzburg, Germany: Flechsig. 2009 [1955]. ISBN 978-3-8035-0003-8.
- Duel Under The Stars—The Memoir of a Luftwaffe Night Pilot in World War II. London: Greenhill Books. 2018. ISBN 978-178-4382582.
