= Rudolf Schoenert =

German World War II night fighter pilot

- Born: 27 July 1911; Glogau, Silesia
- Died: 30 November 1985 (aged 74) province Manitoba, Canada
- Military career
- Allegiance: Nazi Germany
- Branch: Luftwaffe
- Service years: 1933–1945
- Rank: Major of the Reserves
- Commands: 4./NJG 2, Nachtjagdgruppe 10
- Conflicts: World War II: Defense of the Reich
- Awards: Knight's Cross of the Iron Cross with Oak Leaves

Rudolf Schoenert (27 July 1911 – 30 November 1985) was the seventh highest scoring night fighter flying ace in the German Luftwaffe during World War II. He was also a recipient of the Knight's Cross of the Iron Cross with Oak Leaves. The Knight's Cross of the Iron Cross, and its variants were the highest awards in the military and paramilitary forces of Nazi Germany during World War II.

== Early life and career ==
Schoenert was born on 27 July 1911 in Glogau in the Province of Silesia, a province of the German Kingdom of Prussia, today it is Głogów in Poland. On 22 May 1933, he started flight training as a civil pilot with the Deutsche Verkehrsfliegerschule (German Air Transport School) in Braunschweig. From 4 December 1936 to 26 February 1937, he received his recruit training. On 1 April 1937, Schoenert started working as a civil flight instructor.

== World War II ==
After five years in the Merchant Navy, Schoenert began flight training in 1933 and went on to fly commercial aircraft for Lufthansa. He was commissioned as a Leutnant in the Luftwaffe's Reserve in 1938.

=== Night fighter career ===
A map of part of the Kammhuber Line. The 'belt' and night fighter 'boxes' are shown.

Following the 1939 aerial Battle of the Heligoland Bight, Royal Air Force (RAF) attacks shifted to the cover of darkness, initiating the Defence of the Reich campaign. By mid-1940, Generalmajor (Brigadier General) Josef Kammhuber had established a night air defense system dubbed the Kammhuber Line. It consisted of a series of control sectors equipped with radars and searchlights and an associated night fighter. Each sector named a Himmelbett (canopy bed) would direct the night fighter into visual range with target bombers. In 1941, the Luftwaffe started equipping night fighters with airborne radar such as the Lichtenstein radar. This airborne radar did not come into general use until early 1942.

In June 1941, Schoenert joined 4./Nachtjagdgeschwader 1 (NJG 1—1st Night Fighter Wing) at Bergen in northern Holland. He was credited with his first aerial victory on the night of 8/9 July 1941 when he claimed an Armstrong Whitworth Whitley bomber shot down at 02:51 60 kilometres (37 miles) northwest of Vlieland. His total stood at 22 by 25 July 1942 and he was awarded the Knight's Cross of the Iron Cross (Ritterkreuz des Eisernen Kreuzes).

Schoenert is recognized as the instigator of upward-firing armament in German night fighter force. The concept, dubbed Schräge Musik (Jazz Music) was first suggested by him in 1941. Kammhuber initially rejected the idea based on reports filed by Helmut Lent and Werner Streib. Following the Knight's Cross presentation, Schoenert again petitioned the idea to Kammhuber who approved the installation of upward-firing armament in three Dornier Do 217J, one of which issued to Schoenert.

=== Group commander ===
On 1 December 1942, Schoenert was made Gruppenkommandeur (group commander) of the newly formed II. Gruppe of Nachtjagdgeschwader 5 (NJG 5—5th Night Fighter Wing). The Gruppe was equipped with Messerschmitt Bf 110 heavy fighter. Schoenert brought to the Gruppe his modified Do 217 fighter which was inspected by Oberfeldwebel Paul Mahle, an armorer attached to II. Gruppe. Mahle analyzed the concept and installed upward-firing guns into the cockpit of two Bf 110 night fighters.

Schoenert claimed the first aerial victory with Schräge Musik in May 1943.

In his autobiography, fellow night fighter pilot Wilhelm Johnen recalls an evening at Parchim airfield where Schoenert opened a window, gazed at the sunset and described how as a young sailor he had had friends of varied nationalities, 'Britishers, Norwegians, Danes and Germans' and that in the future 'the iron carapace in which the nations shroud themselves, the outward symbols of which are emblems and threats, must be swept away, for the more the modern world uses science, the bloodier will the battles become ... this bloody murder must come to an end'.

On 5 August 1943, Schoenert was appointed Gruppenkommandeur of I. Gruppe of Nachtjagdgeschwader 100 (NJG 100—100th Night Fighter Wing), replacing Hauptmann Heinrich Prinz zu Sayn-Wittgenstein who was transferred. NJG 100 was operating on the Eastern Front, where he claimed to have shot down 30 Soviet aircraft by early 1944. While there, he utilised a Junkers Ju 87D-5 "Stuka" dive-bomber with the configuration in an effort to target the slow-flying Soviet biplane fighter-bombers. On 1 January 1944, Schoenert was appointed commander of Nachtjagdgruppe 10 (NJGr 10—10th Night Fighter Group) and transferred command of I. Gruppe of NJG 100 to Major Alois Lechner.

On 11 April 1944, Schoenert was awarded the Knight's Cross of the Iron Cross with Oak Leaves (Ritterkreuz des Eisernen Kreuzes mit Eichenlaub), the 450th soldier to receive this distinction. The presentation was made by Adolf Hitler at the Berghof, Hitler's residence in the Obersalzberg of the Bavarian Alps, on 5 May 1944. Also present at the ceremony were Anton Hafner, Otto Kittel, Günther Schack, Emil Lang, Alfred Grislawski, Erich Rudorffer, Martin Möbus, Hans-Karl Stepp, Wilhelm Herget, Günther Radusch, Otto Pollmann and Fritz Breithaupt, who all received the Oak Leaves on this date.

On 15 November, Schoenert and Leutnant Karl Schnörrer, Oberst Gordon Gollob, Major Georg Christl, Hauptmann Heinz Strüning, Major Josef Fözö formed the guard of honor at Walter Nowotny funeral at the Zentralfriedhof in Vienna. Nowotny had been killed in action on 8 November 1944. The eulogy was delivered by Generaloberst Otto Deßloch.

On 6 March 1945, Schoenert succeeded Oberstleutnant Walter Borchers as Geschwaderkommodore (wing commander) of NJG 5. During a sortie east of the Elbe on 27 April 1945, an electrical fault rendered Schonert's radar unserviceable and his Junkers Ju 88G was shot down by a Royal Air Force (RAF) de Havilland Mosquito. He survived and was rescued by German troops.

Schoenert survived the war. Schoenert's radio and wireless operator was usually Oberfeldwebel Johannes Richter.

== Summary of career ==
=== Aerial victory claims ===
According to US historian David T. Zabecki, Schoenert was credited with 64 aerial victories. Obermaier lists Schoenert with 65 aerial victories claimed in 376 combat missions, including 35 Soviet aircraft on the Eastern Front. Boiten lists him with 57 confirmed plus six further unconfirmed aerial victories. Foreman, Parry and Mathews, authors of Luftwaffe Night Fighter Claims 1939 – 1945, researched the German Federal Archives and found records for 59 nocturnal victory claims. Mathews and Foreman also published Luftwaffe Aces — Biographies and Victory Claims, listing Schoenert with 62 claims.

Chronicle of aerial victories
This and the ? (question mark) indicates that the aerial victory claim is not listed by Foreman, Mathews and Parry, authors of Luftwaffe Night Fighter Claims 1939 – 1945.
Claim	Date	Time	Type	Location	Serial No./Squadron No.
– 4. Staffel of Nachtjagdgeschwader 1 –
1	9 July 1941	02:51	Whitley	60 km (37 mi) northwest of Vlieland	Whitley Z6555/No. 78 Squadron RAF
2	9 July 1941	03:40	Whitley	55 km (34 mi) northwest of Vlieland	
3	17 July 1941	00:50	Wellington	5 km (3.1 mi) west of Lemmer	
4	4 August 1941	00:14	Wellington	southwest of Stavoren	
5	2 September 1941	23:34	Wellington	15 km (9.3 mi) northeast of Wangerooge	
6	31 October 1941	21:37	Halifax	north of Wangerooge	
7	31 October 1941	22:05	Halifax	15 km (9.3 mi) north of Langeoog	
– 5. Staffel of Nachtjagdgeschwader 2 –
8	1/2 November 1941	—	Hampden		
9	5/6 November 1941	—	Hampden		
10	30 November 1941	20:52	Whitley	10 km (6.2 mi) west of Aurich	Whitley Z9299/No. 77 Squadron RAF
11	10 January 1942	23:15	Wellington	17 km (11 mi) northwest of Langeoog	
12	14 January 1942	20:50	Manchester	5 km (3.1 mi) southwest of Jever	Manchester L7309/No. 207 Squadron RAF
13	26 January 1942	20:56	Whitley		Whitley Z9423/No. 51 Squadron RAF
– 4. Staffel of Nachtjagdgeschwader 2 –
14	28 March 1942	23:21	Halifax		
15	26 April 1942	00:24	Wellington	25 km (16 mi) southwest of Helgoland	
16	18 May 1942	00:24	Stirling	15 km (9.3 mi) northeast of Leeuwarden	Stirling N6071/No. 218 (Gold Coast) Squadron RAF
17	7 June 1942	02:27	Wellington	Borkum	
18	20 June 1942	01:49	Wellington	west of Emden	Wellington Z1256/No. 300 Polish Bomber Squadron
19	23 June 1942	01:17	Wellington	northwest of Baltrum	
20	23 June 1942	02:07	Stirling	north of Aurich	
– 5. Staffel of Nachtjagdgeschwader 2 –
21	20 July 1942	02:51	Halifax	near Borkum	
22	26/27 July 1942	—	Halifax		Halifax W1164/No. 158 Squadron RAF
23	29 July 1942	03:28	Wellington		Wellington X3488/No. 419 Squadron RCAF
– Stab II. Gruppe of Nachtjagdgeschwader 5 –
24	30 March 1943	01:30	Lancaster	northwest of Rerik	Lancaster W4931/No. 207 Squadron RAF
25	21 April 1943	02:23	Lancaster	Gedser harbour	Lancaster W4756/No. 460 Squadron RAAF
26	2 August 1943	02:23	Halifax	Russia	
– Stab I. Gruppe of Nachtjagdgeschwader 100 –
27	16 August 1943	22:08	TB-7	Russia	
28	16 August 1943	23:36	R-5	Russia	
29	16 August 1943	23:56	R-5	Russia	
30	27 August 1943	20:20	TB-7	Krotovko	
31	31 August 1943	22:01	Mitchell	Russia	
32	31 August 1943	22:21	Mitchell	Russia	
33	31 August 1943	22:37	Mitchell	Russia	
34	31 August 1943	23:00	Mitchell	Russia	
35	3 September 1943	22:34	Mitchell	Poltava	
36	6 September 1943	21:03	R-5	Russia	
37	7 September 1943	20:58	DB-3	east of Slobodka	
38	7 September 1943	21:48	DB-3	Brünischlschi	
39	7 September 1943	22:17	PS-84	Grischany	
40	7 September 1943	22:29	PS-84	Mischaly	
41	20 September 1943	23:27	DB-3	Kislyaki	
42	20 September 1943	23:57	DB-3	west Mirgorod	
43?					
44	11 October 1943	20:54	PS-84	north of Charvovo	
45	11 October 1943	21:00	PS-84	southeast of Sapolye	
46	11 October 1943	21:37	PS-84	north of Alexejevo	
47	12 October 1943	22:43	U-2	southeast of Alexandroka	
48	13 October 1943	01:07	DB-3	Babinovitski	
49	13 October 1943	17:46	DB-3	Berseja	
50	13 October 1943	21:24	DB-3	Russia	
51	14 October 1943	18:21	DB-3	west of Demenino	
52	14 October 1943	18:26	DB-3	west of Demenino	
53	14 October 1943	18:37	DB-3	west of Demenino	
54	14 October 1943	20:56	DB-3	Naravoki	
55	15 October 1943	20:17	PS-84	Haschuki	
56	27 October 1943	19:37	DB-3	Warafina	
57	27 October 1943	22:37	R-5	Russia	
– Stab of Nachtjagdgruppe 10 –
59	15 February 1944	21:08	Halifax	north-northwest of Berlin	
60	20 February 1944	04:33	Halifax	6–10 km (3.7–6.2 mi) southwest of Leipzig	

=== Awards ===
- Iron Cross (1939)
  - 2nd Class (10 July 1941)
  - 1st Class (22 July 1941)
- Honour Goblet of the Luftwaffe (Ehrenpokal der Luftwaffe) on 5 January 1942
- German Cross in Gold on 18 May 1942 as Oberleutnant in the 4./Nachtjagdgeschwader 2
- Knight's Cross of the Iron Cross with Oak Leaves
  - Knight's Cross on 25 July 1942 as Oberleutnant of the Reserves and Staffelkapitän of the 4./Nachtjagdgeschwader 2
  - 450th Oak Leaves on 11 April 1944 as Major of the Reserves and commander of Nachtjagdgruppe 10

Military offices
Preceded by Oberstleutnant Walter Borchers	Commander of Nachtjagdgeschwader 5; 5 March 1945 – May 1945	Succeeded by none
