= 1945 Birthday Honours (Mention in Despatches) =

This is a list of Mention in Despatches awarded in the 1945 Birthday Honours.

== Royal Navy ==
- Surgeon Captain Gordon Ernest Dormer Ellis (Westbury, Wilts.).
- Commander John Wyndham Studholme, DSC (Hawick).
- Acting Commander Edmund Henry Cracroft Chapman (Harrogate).
- Acting Commander Lawrence Henry Phillips (Retd.).
- Commander George William Dobson, RD, RNR (Harpenden).
- Commander John Treasure Jones, RD, RNR.
- Commander Deny Parsons, RD, RNR (Dollar).
- Commander Charles Henry Williams, RD, RNR (Retd.) (Cressage, near Shrewsbury).
- Acting Commander Reginald Edkins Clarke, RD, RNR (Durban).
- Engineer Commander Harry Barton Olden (Retd.).
- Commander (E) Arnold Hirst (Yarmouth).
- Commander (E) Arthur Reginald Kirk (Sutton).
- Commander (E) Edward Horace Nutter.
- Commander (E) William Leonard Spear (Plymouth).
- Acting Commander (E) Clifford Ralph Snellgrove (Aylesbury).
- Commander (S) John Eustace Pibworth (Broghead, Morayshire).
- Temporary Major (Acting Temporary Lieutenant-Colonel) Cecil Ross Borland, Royal Marines (Godalming).
- Lieutenant-Commander Eric Hart Dyke (Chagford, Devon).
- Lieutenant-Commander Robert Augustus Fell.
- Lieutenant-Commander Charles Gerald Forsberg (London).
- Lieutenant-Commander Brian Desmond Gallie, DSC (Dorchester).
- Lieutenant-Commander Colin Cargill Beveridge Mackenzie (Kingston, Bagpuize, near Abingdon).
- Lieutenant-Commander Nigel Edward Godfrey Roper, DSO.
- Lieutenant-Commander Peter Van Bredon Wadlow (Budleigh Salterton).
- Acting Lieutenant-Commander Philip Kynvin Lankester.
- Lieutenant-Commander Charles Alexander Meyer, RD, RNR (Holyhead).
- Lieutenant-Commander Geoffrey Ernest Milner, MBE, RD, RNR (Retd.) (Parkstone, Dorset).
- Temporary Acting Lieutenant-Commander William Stanley Adams, RNR.
- Temporary Acting Lieutenant-Commander (N) John Blair Anderson, RNR (Mauchline, Ayrshire).
- Temporary Acting Lieutenant-Commander William Harold Brittain, DSC, RNR (Shrewsbury).
- Acting Temporary Lieutenant-Commander Jesse Dixon, RNR (Milford Haven).
- Acting Temporary Lieutenant-Commander Walter Gibson, RNR (Kelso).
- Temporary Acting Lieutenant-Commander John Edward Miles, RNR (Hull).
- Lieutenant-Commander William Chilton Brooks, MBE, RNVR (Birkdale).
- Acting Temporary Lieutenant-Commander John Kirke Craig, RNVR(Glasgow).
- Temporary Acting Lieutenant-Commander Ronald Fitzgerald Barton Beesley, RNVR
- Temporary Acting Lieutenant-Commander Leslie Ernest Humphries Brunton, RNVR (Tonbridge).
- Acting Temporary Lieutenant-Commander Leonard Jolly, RNVR (Lytham).
- Temporary Acting Lieutenant-Commander Norman Herbert Jones, RNVR (Claygate).
- Acting Lieutenant-Commander William Norman Kennedy, RNVR (White Craigs, Renfrewshire).
- Temporary Acting Lieutenant-Commander Geoffrey William Le Gallais, RNVR
- Temporary Acting Lieutenant-Commander Edward Hugh Pratt, RNVR (Canterbury).
- Acting Temporary Lieutenant-Commander Charles William Coslett Stevens, RNVR (Cardiff).
- Acting Lieutenant-Commander (A) Bruce John Albert Hawkes (Great Houghton).
- Lieutenant-Commander (E) Charles William Gordon Ham.
- Lieutenant-Commander (E) Malcolm Hazlitt Sayers, DSC.
- Lieutenant-Commander (E) Arthur Francis Turner (London).
- Acting Lieutenant-Commander (E) John Nicholas Mutter (Retd.) (Gillingham).
- Temporary Lieutenant-Commander (E) Alfred James Brabban, RNR.
- Temporary Lieutenant-Commander (E) Alexander Arthur Graham, RNR (Giffnock).
- Temporary Lieutenant-Commander (E) Rodney William George Wise, RNR (Bruton, Somerset).
- Temporary Acting Lieutenant-Commander (E) John Morrison, RCNR (Vancouver).
- Temporary Acting Lieutenant-Commander (E) William Vanderzwan, DSC, RNVR
- Surgeon Lieutenant-Commander Frank William Baskerville, LMSSA (Plymouth).
- Surgeon Lieutenant-Commander Robert Burns Hamilton Faichney, RNVR (East Kilbride, Lanarkshire).
- Temporary Acting Surgeon Lieutenant-Commander Francis Cameron Edington, MB, ChB, RNVR (Penrith).
- Temporary Acting Surgeon Lieutenant-Commander (D) Dennison Laverick, LDS, RCS, RNVR (London).
- Acting Lieutenant-Commander (S) Geoffrey Harold Lewis Kitson (Hunstanton).
- Temporary Acting Lieutenant-Commander (S) Norman Victor Craven, RNVR (Southport).
- Temporary Acting Lieutenant-Commander (S) David Hailing Hammond, RNVR
- Temporary Acting Lieutenant-Commander (S) Tom Alistair MacFarlane, RNVR (Liverpool).
- The Reverend Donovan Bawdon Allen, MA, Temporary Chaplain, RNVR (Birmingham).
- Lieutenant Lesley Edney Blackmore (Weston-super-Mare).
- Lieutenant George Blackwood.
- Lieutenant Jack Broughton Cox (Winchcomb).
- Lieutenant Ronald Gargill Campbell Greenlees (Musselburgh).
- Lieutenant John Dorsett Owen Hinton.
- Lieutenant Alfred Nelson Littleboy (Fulham).
- Lieutenant Samuel George Potts (Plymouth).
- Lieutenant Laurence Robson.
- Lieutenant Howard Thomas Arthur Winnall (Auckland, New Zealand).
- Temporary Lieutenant James Ayton (Londonderry).
- Lieutenant Charles Peter d'Auvergne Aplin, RNR (London).
- Lieutenant Kenneth Maurice Cutler, RNR (Monkseaton).
- Lieutenant Peter Stanhope Marchant, RNR (Peaslake, Surrey).
- Lieutenant Kenneth Ashley Rowbotham, RNR (Barrow-in-Furness).
- Lieutenant Donald Philip Runtz, RNR (Beaconsfield).
- Lieutenant Stanley Samuel Mitchell, RNR (Farnham).
- Temporary Lieutenant David Lawrence Gall, RNR (Broughty Ferry, Scotland).
- Temporary Lieutenant Frank Rowland Pretty, RNR.
- Lieutenant Herbert James Spencer, RNVR (London).
- Temporary Lieutenant Reginald Charles Anciaume, RNVR (Ealing).
- Temporary Lieutenant Thomas David Andrews, RNVR (Felixstowe).
- Temporary Lieutenant Kenneth Metcalfe Banks, RNVR (Northallerton).
- Temporary Lieutenant Jeffrey Stanway Blackburn, RNVR (Manchester).
- Temporary Lieutenant Frank Muil Brackenridge, RNVR (London, N.2).
- Temporary Lieutenant Reginald Robert Brett, RNVR (Hounslow).
- Temporary Lieutenant Thomas Arthur Byrne, RNVR
- Temporary Lieutenant Ernest Gray Cathro, RNVR (Angus).
- Temporary Lieutenant Reginald Henry Clifton, RNVR (Haywards Heath).
- Temporary Lieutenant Ray Cloberry Christian, RNVR (Derby).
- Temporary Lieutenant Harold Aubrey Dale, RNVR (Sunbury-on-Thames).
- Temporary Lieutenant Trevor Etienne Bruno de Hamel, RNVR (Lichfield).
- Temporary Lieutenant Arthur Dodd, RNVR (Gidea Park).
- Temporary Lieutenant Norman Edgar Gibbons, RNVR (Eltham).
- Temporary Lieutenant William Eric Myhill Grint, RNVR
- Temporary Lieutenant Jock Seton Guthrie, RNVR (Stratford-on-Avon).
- Temporary Lieutenant George Hatton, RNVR (London).
- Temporary Lieutenant Norman Holloway, RNVR (Doncaster).
- Temporary Lieutenant John Hutchinson, RNVR (Halifax).
- Temporary Lieutenant Frederick John Jones, RNVR (Berechurch, near Colchester).
- Temporary Lieutenant John Hamar Jones, RNVR (Bournemouth).
- Temporary Lieutenant Robert Knott, RNVR (Stockport).
- Temporary Lieutenant Herbert William Leeds, RNVR (London).
- Temporary Lieutenant William Lavell McNaughton, RNVR (Pinner).
- Temporary Lieutenant Gordon Oswald Reginald Meyer, RNVR (Putney).
- Temporary Lieutenant John Douglas Gordon Mitchell, RNVR (London).
- Temporary Lieutenant Douglas Charles Morrison, RNVR (Colchester).
- Temporary Lieutenant John Michael Joseph Palmer, RNVR (Leicester).
- Temporary Lieutenant Thomas Hayward Pannell, RNVR (Leatherhead).
- Temporary Lieutenant Richard Henry Powell, RNVR (Radcliffe-on-Trent).
- Temporary Lieutenant Charles Ernest Scrine, RNVR (London).
- Temporary Lieutenant Stephen Cuthbert Samuel Skene, RNVR (Durham).
- Temporary Lieutenant Edmund Kidson Smith, RNVR (Leeds).
- Temporary Lieutenant Raymond William Smith, RNVR (West Bromwich).
- Temporary Lieutenant William Alfred Stevens, RNVR (London).
- Temporary Lieutenant Donald Sutherland, RNVR (Ashurstwood).
- Temporary Lieutenant William Charles Thwaites, RNVR (Shoreham).
- Temporary Lieutenant Douglas Alexander John Tratner, RNVR (Llandrindod Wells).
- Temporary Lieutenant Reginald Henry Wade, RNVR (High Wycombe).
- Temporary Lieutenant Duncan James Campbell Walker, RNVR (Glasgow).
- Temporary Lieutenant George Harold Williams, RNVR
- Temporary Lieutenant Eric Ronald Wilson, RNVR (Hull).
- Temporary Lieutenant Wilfred Arthur Wortham, RNVR (London).
- Lieutenant Clive Barker Dillon, RANVR (Sydney).
- Temporary Lieutenant Ralph Gerald Murrell, RANVR.
- Temporary Lieutenant William Alexander Wood, RANVR (Sydney).
- Temporary Lieutenant Croft G. Brook, RCNVR (Vancouver).
- Temporary Lieutenant Allen Thomas Fallis, RCNVR (Winnipeg).
- Temporary Lieutenant John David Keys, RCNVR (Montreal).
- Temporary Lieutenant George Alexander Mavety, RCNVR (Toronto).
- Temporary Lieutenant Mervyn Alexander Patterson, VD, RCNVR (Regina, Sask.).
- Temporary Lieutenant Richard Miles Steele, RCNVR (St. John, N.B.).
- Temporary Lieutenant John Rawson Kenneth Stewart, RCNVR (Cowichan Bay, B.C.).
- Temporary Lieutenant Douglas Leonard Hazard, RNZNVR (Hamilton, New Zealand).
- Temporary Lieutenant Roderick Thomas McIndoe, RNZNVR (Wanganui, New Zealand).
- Temporary Lieutenant Kenneth Howden Webb, RNZNVR (Wellington, New Zealand).
- Temporary Acting Lieutenant George Baines, RNVR (Retford).
- Temporary Acting Lieutenant David Manson Muir, RNVR (Newton Mearns).
- Temporary Acting Lieutenant Peter Frederick Smith, RNVR (Hull).
- Temporary Lieutenant (A) Cecil Michael Keller, RNVR (Waterford, Eire).
- Acting Lieutenant (A) David Edmond Strachan Pery-Knox-Gore, RNVR (Maclear, Capt Province, S.A.).
- Temporary Lieutenant (A) Allen Whitelaw Stewart, RNVR (Rhu, Dumbartonshire).
- Temporary Lieutenant (E) Alexander Dennis Taylor (Loughborough).
- Acting Lieutenant (E) Clarence George Cole (Plymouth)
- Acting Lieutenant (E) William John Sims (Portsmouth).
- Temporary Lieutenant (E) Arthur Lionel Benke, RNR (Christchurch, Hants).
- Temporary Lieutenant (E) Arthur Elmer Blankley, RNR.
- Temporary Lieutenant (E) Thomas Henry Child, RNR (Cardiff).
- Temporary Lieutenant (E) Harold Gummer, RNR (Swindon).
- Temporary Lieutenant (E) Geoffrey Robert Harry Lewis, RNR (Cardiff).
- Temporary Lieutenant (E) Harold Paul James Poulson, RNR (Edinburgh).
- Lieutenant (E) Bruce Ford Booth, RCNR (Vancouver).
- Temporary Lieutenant (E) Archibald William Ainslie, RNVR (Newcastle upon Tyne).
- Temporary Lieutenant (E) Robert Bruce, RNVR (London, S.W.1).
- Temporary Lieutenant (E) Stanley James Duncombe, RNVR (London).
- Temporary Lieutenant (E) Walter Smith, RNVR (Wirral).
- Lieutenant (E) Llewellyn Ivor Jones, RNZNVR (Gloucester).
- Temporary Surgeon Lieutenant Gilbert Maurice Baird, MB, ChB, RNVR.
- Temporary Surgeon Lieutenant David Russell Kerr, MB, ChB, RNVR (Styal, Lanes).
- Lieutenant (S) Peter John Glason (Reading).
- Lieutenant (S) Robert Magill Young (Exeter).
- Temporary Lieutenant (S) Luis Diez, RNR (Liverpool).
- Temporary Lieutenant (S) Rodney George Pullen, RNR.
- Temporary Lieutenant (S) Arthur Leslie Bedwell, RNVR (Hornsey).
- Temporary Lieutenant (S) Maxwell Burton, RNVR.
- Temporary Lieutenant (S) Peter Vivian Lorne, RNVR (Blindley Heath, Surrey).
- Temporary Lieutenant (S) John Stoney, RNVR (Whitby).
- Temporary Lieutenant (S) Alec Warburton, RNVR (Liverpool).
- Lieutenant (S) David Charles Staley, KRNVR (Mombasa).
- Margery Rylance Bammant, Second Officer, WRNS.
- Skipper Lieutenant Magnus Andrew Smith, RD, RNR, 2388W.S.
- Acting Skipper Lieutenant William Cardno, RNR, W.S.2849 (Fraserburgh).
- Acting Skipper Lieutenant Arthur George Day, RNR, W.S.2087 (Poulton le Fylde).
- Acting Skipper Lieutenant Edward James Day, RNR, W.S.2704.
- Acting Chief Skipper James William Greengrass, RNR, W.S.3423 (Grimsby).
- Acting Chief Skipper William Henry Makings, RNR (Retd.), W.S.2740 (Grimsby).
- Acting Temporary Chief Skipper Robert Cooper, RNR, T.S.384 (Grimsby).
- Acting Temporary Chief Skipper Alfred Hales, RNR, T.S.182.
- Acting Temporary Chief Skipper George Wingfield Smith, RNR, T.S.118 (Kessingland Beach, hear Lowestoft).
- Acting Temporary Chief Skipper Cyril Young, RNR, T.S.542 (Hull).
- Skipper Vincent Nicolini, MBE, RNR, T.S.628 (Hull).
- Skipper George Sutherland, RNR, W.S.3726 (Hopeman, Morayshire).
- Temporary Skipper Frederick Webb, RNR, T.S.785.
- Temporary Skipper George Wood, RNR, T.8.966 (Aberdeen).
- Mr. Donovan John Shedlock Newton, Chief Officer, RFA.
- Temporary Sub-Lieutenant Robert William Burke, RNVR (Weybridge).
- Temporary Sub-Lieutenant Frank Robert Dixon, RNVR.
- Temporary Sub-Lieutenant Leonard Fewell, RNVR (Brighton).
- Temporary Sub-Lieutenant Peter Stanley Gregory, RNVR (Taunton).
- Temporary Sub-Lieutenant Peter John Kelly, RNVR (London).
- Temporary Sub-Lieutenant Derek Basil Laughton, RNVR (Cuckfield).
- Temporary Sub-Lieutenant Frank Paul MacPhail, RNVR (London).
- Temporary Sub-Lieutenant Sidney Anthony Rotheray, RNVR (Ilkley).
- Temporary Sub-Lieutenant James Buchan Stott, RNVR (Plymouth).
- Temporary Sub-Lieutenant (A) Dennis Mansfield, RNVR (Bournemouth).
- Temporary Sub-Lieutenant (A) Peter George Henry Roome, RNVR (Greenock).
- Temporary Acting Sub-Lieutenant (E) Ralph Mackintosh (Monmouth).
- Temporary Sub-Lieutenant (E) William Ernest Cooper, RNVR (Bebiagton).
- Temporary Lieutenant Cuthbert Denton Collingwood, Royal Marines (Bolton).
- Mr. Cornelius Stephen Lyons, Commissioned Gunner (Hoylake).
- Mr. Ernest George Wye, Commissioned Gunner.
- Mr. Norman Jack Dominy, Gunner (Thornton Heath).
- Mr. Albert James Hooper Glanville, Temporary Gunner (Harrow).
- Mr. Edward Gibson Hadley, Temporary Gunner (Gillingham).
- Mr. James Alfred Matthews, Gunner (T) (Brighton).
- Mr. John Oakley, Temporary Warrant Shipwright (Devonport).
- Mr. Edward George Smith, Temporary Warrant Shipwright (Gillingham).
- Mr. Frank William White, Acting Warrant Shipwright (Southsea).
- Mr. Henry Charles Hillind, MBE, Commissioned Boatswain (Newport, Isle of Wight).
- Mr. John Percival Finch, Boatswain (Portsmouth).
- Mr. Geoffrey Alan Bloodworth, Signal Boatswain.
- Mr. Alan George Pamplin, Warrant Telegraphist (Doncaster).
- Mr. Reginald George Steward, Temporary Acting Warrant Master-at-Arms.
- Mr. Ambrose Thomas Beckett, Warrant Engineer.
- Mr. Archibald Christopher Menzies, Warrant Engineer (Chatham).
- Mr. Arthur Edward Bird, Temporary Warrant Engineer (Surbiton).
- Mr. Frederick Robert Blaber, DSM (Newquay).
- Mr. Cyril Desmond Carpenter, Temporary Warrant Engineer (Middlesbrough).
- Mr. Stewart Harold Dutton, Temporary Warrant Engineer (Brinscombe, Gloucester).
- Mr. Leslie Norris, Temporary Warrant Engineer (Purbrook).
- Mr. Leonard Hicks Williams, Temporary Warrant Engineer (Gillingham).
- Mr. William Henry Gillard, Temporary Warrant Electrician (Selsey).
- Mr. Richard Belton Brooks, Warrant Mechanician (Portsmouth).
- Mr. John Edwin Dearlove, Temporary Warrant Mechanician.
- Mr. Walter Thomas Francklin, Temporary Warrant Wardmaster (Deal).
- Mr. Albert Charles Gundry, Temporary Warrant Writer Officer (Portsmouth).
- Mr. Ernest Wilfred Larke, Warrant Stores Officer (Gillingham).
- Mr. George Alfred Moore, Temporary Warrant Stores Officer (Plymouth).
- Chief Petty Officer Frank Henry Bates, D/J.109636 (Exmouth).
- Chief Petty Officer John Brodie, D/J.39012 (Edinburgh).
- Chief Petty Officer Richard Ernest Chambers, BEM, P/J.33143 (Brighton).
- Chief Petty Officer Frederick James Churches, C/J.104283 (Seven Kings).
- Chief Petty Officer Richard Lionel Courtenay, DSM, D/J.106382 (Launceston).
- Chief Petty Officer Leonard William Hiscock, P/J.37448.
- Chief Petty Officer Horace Sidney Keith, P/J.107705.
- Chief Petty Officer Sydney Walter King, D/J.34048 (Liskeard, Cornwall).
- Chief Petty Officer Charles James Wallace Morgan, D/J.100025.
- Chief Petty Officer John Munro, C/JX.127738 (Dover).
- Chief Petty Officer (Gunner's Mate) Edward Kennedy Parnell, P/J.114864 (Hornsea).
- Chief Petty Officer Frank William Arthur Pearsall, C/JX.127292 (Rochester).
- Chief Petty Officer Leslie Oliver Porter, RCNR, A.2124 (Hamilton, Ontario).
- Chief Petty Officer Walter Ferdinand Rutter, DSM, C/JX.125245.
- Chief Petty Officer Ernest Edward Stanley, DSM, D/J.107905 (Walton-on-Thames).
- Chief Petty Officer Richard William Wakeford, R.209133 (East Barnet).
- Chief Petty Officer Robert Webber, R.C.N.2914 (Vancouver).
- Chief Petty Officer William Weller, D/J.107061 (Horsham).
- Temporary Chief Petty Officer Harry Arksey, C/J.114674 (Hull).
- Temporary Chief Petty Officer Arthur Bowden, D/J.98430 (Plymouth).
- Temporary Chief Petty Officer William Cross, P/J.383.
- Temporary Chief Petty Officer Frederick Arthur Gibbs, C/JX.132279 (London).
- Temporary Chief Petty Officer Harold John Mahood, C/JX.126390 (Peckham).
- Temporary Chief Petty Officer Eric Frank Osmay Moore, P/J.92945 (Portsmouth).
- Acting Chief Petty Officer John William Redpath, C/JX.144791.
- Acting Chief Petty Officer William Porte, D/J.101896 (Grimsby).
- Master-at-Arms Harold Henry Coleman, D/M.39836
- Master-at-Arms Frederick Henry Dawe, D/MX.40111 (Weymouth).
- Master-at-Arms George Dermody, D/M.40169 (Devonport).
- Master-at-Arms John David Percy Skinner, C.M.39857 (Sidcup).
- Master-at-Arms Richard Stewart Worth, D/M.39632 (Devonport).
- Temporary Master-at-Arms Frank Arthur Frederick Hatch, C/M.40097 (Fort William).
- Temporary Master-at-Arms Alfred Charles Lynch, BEM, C/MX.59273 (Sandgate).
- Chief Yeoman of Signals Lemuel Charles Burgess, P/J.41934 (Eastbourne).
- Chief Yeoman of Signals William Deeley, C/JX.133188 (Islington).
- Chief Yeoman of Signals John Edward Giddings, C/JX.133765 (London).
- Chief Yeoman of Signals James William Small, D/JX.132902 (Torquay).
- Chief Yeoman of Signals John Lorimer Ward, P/JX.129291 (Lough).
- Temporary Chief Yeoman of Signals Albert Samuel Burrell, D/J.110636 (Wallsend-on-Tyne).
- Chief Petty Officer Telegraphist Ernest George Charles Butcher, P/JX.134575 (Cockley, near Warminster).
- Chief Petty Officer Telegraphist Charles Edward Cock, P/JX.155788 (Portsmouth).
- Chief Petty Officer Telegraphist Alfred Goldsmith, P/J.69649 (Probus, Cornwall).
- Chief Petty Officer Telegraphist Ernest Alfred Guinevan, P/JX.131077 (London).
- Chief Petty Officer Telegraphist Percy William Hancock, P/JX.126610 (Portsmouth).
- Chief Petty Officer Telegraphist Walter White Hodges, P/JX.130111.
- Chief Petty Officer Telegraphist William Charles Prior, P/J.79059 (Liverpool).
- Chief Petty Officer Telegraphist Michael Wafer, D/JX.133000 (Aglada, Co. Cork).
- Temporary Chief Petty Officer Telegraphist Alexander Wigham McIntosh, C/JX.390469 (Ayr).
- Chief Engine Room Artificer Forrest William Atkins, D/M.2818 (Newark).
- Chief Engine Room Artificer Simeon Bailey, D/188.E.D (Barrow-in-Furness).
- Chief Engine Room Artificer Daniel Frederick Baker, C/MX.56841 (Farnham).
- Chief Engine Room Artificer Lawrence Mortimore Barker, C/MX.49805 (Bedford).
- Chief Engine Room Artificer Lionel Button, C/M.33838.
- Chief Engine Room Artificer Robert Edwin Clague, DSM, C/MX.50607 (Balorine, Isle of Man).
- Chief Engine Room Artificer Charles Frederick Morton Clark, C/MX.4600o.
- Chief Engine Room Artificer Stanley Richard Clark, D/M.34908 (Plymouth).
- Chief Engine Room Artificer Lawrence Henry Bawden Day, C/M.38786 (Plymouth).
- Chief Engine Room Artificer Frederick Ronald Earp, C/MX.47847 (Alton).
- Chief Engine Room Artificer Francis George Gardner, C/MX.49504 (Fratton).
- Chief Engine Room Artificer Charles Jack Harris, C/MX.49763.
- Chief Engine Room Artificer Kenneth George Hayman, DSM, C/M.36696 (Borstal, Kent).
- Chief Engine Room Artificer Charles Robert Hayton, P/MX.54680 (Thornaby-on-Tees).
- Chief Engine Room Artificer Ernest Redver Head, D/MX.47780.
- Chief Engine Room Artificer Edmund Walter Thomas Janes, P/MX.55095 (Portsmouth).
- Chief Engine Room Artificer Douglas Royston Matthews, D/MX.46196.
- Chief Engine Room Artificer Thomas James William Powell, P/MX.55749 (Cosham).
- Chief Engine Room Artificer Terence William Ransley, P/MX.45644 (Portsmouth).
- Chief Engine Room Artificer George Harry Rolls, DSM, P/MX.49955.
- Chief Engine Room Artificer Albert WilKam Smith, D/M.28824 (Plymouth).
- Chief Engine Room Artificer William Bertie Smithfield, D/MX.47036 (Gollant Park, Cornwall).
- Chief Engine Room Artificer Bernard Newberry Tolchard, C/M.7082 (Gillingham).
- Chief Engine Room Artificer Charles Harry Timms, DSM, C/MX.49743 (Gillingham).
- Chief Engine Room Artificer Albert Edward Wood, C/MX.48509 (Iver, Bucks).
- Temporary Chief Engine Room Artificer Frederick Hugh Venables, D/MX.48546.
- Temporary Chief Engine Room Artificer William George Wright, C/MX.4998 (Portsmouth).
- Temporary Acting Chief Engine Room Artificer Thomas Joseph Campbell, C/MX.49496 (Lisburne, Co. Antrim).
- Acting Chief Engine Room Artificer Robert Atkinson, D/MX.48887 (Sheffield).
- Temporary Acting Chief Engine Room Artificer Desmond Arthur Barnard, D/MX.54586 (Plymouth).
- Temporary Acting Chief Engine Room Artificer Walter Gwynne Jones, P/MX.55654 (Ponlyberem, Carmarthenshire).
- Temporary Acting Chief Engine Room Artificer Maurice Victor William Ransom, C/MX.49520.
- Acting Chief Engine Room Artificer William Tyerman, C/MX.49942.
- Acting Chief Engine Room Artificer George Thomas Wallis, C/MX.48683 (Chatham).
- Engine Room Artificer 1st Class Robert Hugh Gornall, C/MX.46184 (Ashford).
- Engine Room Artificer 1st Class James Henry Stevens, D/M.24139.
- Engine Room Artificer 1st Class John Henry Davis, C/MX.56635 (Farnham).
- Engine Room Artificer 2nd Class Douglas Alfred Broderick, D/MX.53062.
- Engine Room Artificer 2nd Class William Richard Chamberlain, D/X.2901EA (Bristol).
- Engine Room Artificer 2nd Class Horace Arnold Filmore, P/MX.53576 (Ryde).
- Engine Room Artificer 3rd Class John Jenkin Bonsor, D/MX.60542 (Newton Grange).
- Engine Room Artificer 3rd Class James Cathcart, P/MX.79649 (Hamilton, Lanarkshire).
- Engine Room Artificer 3rd Class Eric Brotherston Cooper, C/MX.53092 (Gillingham).
- Engine Room Artificer 3rd Class Barney John Cummings, D/MX.73347 (Dunkirk, France).
- Engine Room Artificer 3rd Class Sidney Dawes, D/MX.56208.
- Engine Room Artificer 3rd Class Reginald Francis Hugh Dowd, D/MX.51748 (Plymouth).
- Engine Room Artificer 3rd Class Ben Richard Erridge, C/MX.65516 (Aberdeen).
- Engine Room Artificer 3rd Class Frederick John Evans, D/MX.74237 (Cardiff).
- Engine Room Artificer 3rd Class Joshua Hallam, C / MX.71352.
- Engine Room Artificer 3rd Class Thomas Heffernan, D/MX.55835 (Manchester).
- Engine Room Artificer 3rd Class Thomas Liptrot, C/MX.73449 (Timperley).
- Engine Room Artificer 3rd Class Stanley Swan, D/MX.70667 (Bedlington).
- Engine Room Artificer 3rd Class Ernest Frederick Waite, D/MX.60517 (Bristol).
- Engine Room Artificer 3rd Class Gordon Wood, C/MX.76148 (Chesterfield).
- Engine Room Artificer 3rd Class William Wood, P/MX.69952 (Burntisland, Fife).
- Engine Room Artificer Frederick Henry Clarke, P/MX.60424 (Milford-on-Sea).
- Engine Room Artificer George Wilfred Hargreaves, C/JX.506647 (Esher).
- Air Artificer 3rd Class Norman Day, FAA/FX.75062 (St. Leonard's-on-Sea).
- Air Artificer John Langley, FAA/SFX.213 (Ipswich).
- Chief Electrical Artificer George Philip Smith, C/MX.46563 (Portsmouth).
- Chief Electrical Artificer Walter William Samson, C/M.39485.
- Electrical Artificer 1st Class Sampson Charles Gripton, C/M.30423 (Gillingham).
- Electrical Artificer 3rd Class George Ernest Earn, P/MX.61481 (Enfield).
- Electrical Artificer 3rd Class Richard Stansfield, D/MX.62510.
- Chief Ordnance Artificer Walter William Coles, P/MX.47266 (Portsmouth).
- Chief Ordnance Artificer Jack George Heath, P/MX.47812 (Portsmouth).
- Chief Ordnance Artificer James Albert Mitchell, P/MX.57714.
- Ordnance Artificer 1st Class Arthur Dane Jeffery, D/M.394&6.
- Ordnance Artificer 3rd Class Arthur James Higginson, D/MX.64101 (Burbage, Leicestershire).
- Ordnance Artificer 3rd Class John Edward Ratcliffe, C/MX.66740 (Manchester).
- Ordnance Artificer 3rd Class Leslie Charles Tolcher, D/MX.49968 (Plymouth).
- Chief Mechanician Evan Henry Brown, D/K.59719 (Plymouth).
- Mechanician 1st Class Reginald Charles Digby, C/KX.88896 (Leigh-on-Sea).
- Mechanician 1st Class Thomas Charles Frederick Morphew, P/KX.90282 (Portsmouth).
- Chief Motor Mechanic Gilbert Begg, C/MX.68727 (Aboyne).
- Chief Motor Mechanic Thomas Eric Padbury, P/MX.116836 (Wappenbury, Warwickshire).
- Chief Motor Mechanic James Edwin Alfred Southeard, D/MX.67098.
- Acting Chief Motor Mechanic 4th Class Alexander Masson Taylor, C/MX.76150 (Stonehaven).
- Chief Stoker Walter Allen Applin, C/K.60587 (Bournemouth).
- Chief Stoker Sidney Beck, C/K.59923 (Gillingham).
- Chief Stoker Ernest Thomas Bowler, D/K.65404 (Whitefield).
- Chief Stoker John Nicholas James Davies, D/K.65957 (Redruth).
- Chief Stoker Albert Edney, DSM, P/K.59031 (Portsmouth).
- Chief Stoker James Evans, P/K.61174 (Fortrose).
- Chief Stoker William Arthur Frost, D/KX.76982 (Plymouth).
- Chief Stoker William Acton Griffiths, P/KX.77013 (Manchester).
- Chief Stoker Charles Harold Frank Hanks, D/K.55788 (Heamore, Cornwall).
- Chief Stoker Herbert John Mitchell, C/K.56457 (Sittingbourne).
- Chief Stoker Joseph Moody, P/KX.78522.
- Chief Stoker Stanley Herbert Murphy, C/K.64917 (Swansea).
- Chief Stoker George Henry Osborne, D/K.65285 (Tavistock).
- Chief Stoker Frederick Thomas Patrick Paddon, D/K.54730 (Newton Abbot).
- Chief Stoker Richard James Palmer, D/K.66140 (Wells).
- Chief Stoker Arthur Leonard Potts, C/K.60552 (Wouldham, Kent).
- Chief Stoker John Charles Ricketts, D'/K.57390 (Plymouth).
- Chief Stoker Sidney Albert Rogers, C/K.60240 (Sittingbourne).
- Chief Stoker Arthur Schofield, C/K.60737 (Oldham).
- Chief Stoker William Charles Sewell, C/K.59483 (Hendon).
- Chief Stoker Gerald Arthur Studden, D/KX.75518 (St. Dominic, Cornwall).
- Chief Stoker Bernard Trevaskis, D/K.56389 (Plymouth).
- Chief Stoker George Edward Whiffen, C/K.29785 (Eltham).
- Temporary Chief Stoker Harold Sydney Clark, P/K.60028 (Portsmouth).
- Temporary Chief Stoker Denis Salter, D/K.65039 (Ballinure, Eire).
- Chief Engineman George Chorlton, LT/KX.112800 (Hull).
- Wartime Chief Engineman Ernest Leonard Fisher, LT/KX.125301.
- Chief Engineman John William Hewson, LT/X.259W (Hartlepool).
- Chief Engineman Alexander Jappy, LT/X.451 E.U (Port Knockie).
- Chief Engineman Ernest OXtoby, LT/KX.124851.
- Chief Engineman George Ross, LT/KX.113961.
- Temporary Chief Joiner Frederick Shellcock, C/MX.47106 (Rotherham).
- Chief Shipwright Alfred John Baker, D/M.39510 (Plymouth).
- Chief Shipwright Edwin Arnold Payne, P/MX.47482 (Cosham).
- Temporary Chief Shipwright Stanley Alfred Handley, P/MX.50821.
- Shipwright 3rd Class Ernest Clifford Masterton, P/MX.88618 (Cbwes).
- Second Hand Harry George Fletcher, LT/X.21396A (Lowestoft).
- Wartime Second Hand James Patrick Hargreaves, LT/JX.167011 (Fleetwood).
- Second Hand Robert William Hovell, LT/X.18936.
- Second Hand Thomas Edward Jackson, LT/JX.174484 (Hoylake).
- Second Hand James Douglas Mayall, LT/X.20534A (Lowestoft).
- Second Hand George Anderson Thompson, LT/JX.280425 (Cellar Dyke, Fife).
- Carpenter David Thomas Booth, N.A.P.655218 (London, N.W.10).
- Temporary Sick Berth Chief Petty Officer Arthur George Popplewell, D/MX.47460 (Plympton).
- Temporary Chief Petty Officer Writer Robert Frank Bull, P/MX.59933 (Southampton).
- Temporary Chief Petty Officer Writer James Booth Thornton, C/MX.52445 (North Shields).
- Stores Chief Petty Officer William Evans, D/MX.47504 (Shrewsbury).
- Stores Chief Petty Officer William Arthur Langdon, P/MX.51129.
- Stores Chief Petty Officer Maurice John Perrin, D/MX.48819 (Wadebridge).
- Stores Chief Petty Officer Jack Taylor, C/M.87884.
- Stores Chief Petty Officer James Wellard, C/MX.51151 (Gillingham).
- Stores Chief Petty Officer Albert George Wilson, C/M.29726 (Gillingham).
- Stores Chief Petty Officer Gordon Knowle Williams, D/MX.45447 (Exmouth).
- Temporary Stores Chief Petty Officer Harold Pritchard, C/MX.47522.
- Temporary Stores Chief Petty Officer Joseph Frederick Rockey, P/MX.53439 (Hove).
- Temporary Stores Chief Petty Officer Edward Sydney John Rose, P/MX.52719 (Southsea).
- Chief Petty Officer Cook (S) Percy James Bailey, D/MX.45584 (Plymouth).
- Chief Petty Officer Cook Alfred Ernest Hamley, D/M.35158 (Plymouth).
- Chief Petty Officer Cook (S) Cyril Douglas Hughes, P/MX.46494 (Portsmouth).
- Chief Petty Officer Cook (S) Frank George Pearson, C/M.37811 (Chatham).
- Chief Petty Officer Cook Charlie Stemp, C/M.13320 (Rainham).
- Chief Petty Officer Cook (S) Henry Bardwell Ward, C/MX.45952 (Gillingham).
- Temporary Chief Petty Officer Cook (S) John Newton, R.C.N.40512 (Strathmore, P.Q.).
- Acting Chief Petty Officer Cook (O) David Geddes Burns, P/MX.64305 (Glasgow).
- Acting Chief Petty Officer Cook (O) Stanley Mostyn Joffre Wiggins, D/MX.55961 (Barry Dock, South Wales).
- Canteen Manager Joe Neill, C/NX.1425 (Keighley).
- Chief Steward Clarence Patrick Healey, R.F.A.
- Chief Steward 1st Class Frank Winston Sawle, NAP/1093867 (Southport).
- Colour Sergeant (Acting Temporary Quartermaster Sergeant) John Roberts, RM, Ch.X.332 (Grays, Essex).
- Petty Officer Stanley Booth, P/J.112458.
- Petty Officer Thomas Sidney Carey, D/J.113396 (Devonport).
- Petty Officer Frederick Joseph Carter, D/JX.152248 (Devonport).
- Petty Officer James Bertie Christie, LT/JX.200834 (Hampton).
- Petty Officer Frank Edmund John Church, LT/JX.164571 (Great Yarmouth).
- Petty Officer Thomas Richard Cranstone, C/J.101792 (South Harrow).
- Petty Officer James Heber Crawford, P/J.100899 (Welling).
- Petty Officer Henry James Curtis, LT/JX.193925 (Norwich).
- Petty Officer Edward Newton Darke, P/J.108434 (Southsea).
- Petty Officer Leonard Davis, P/JX.145997 (Bosham, Surrey).
- Petty Officer Frank Charles Devoil, C/JX.131005 (Bexhill-on-Sea).
- Petty Officer Charles Dunne, D/J.110526 (Dublin).
- Petty Officer George William Elliott, D/JX.125750 (Devonport).
- Petty Officer Alfred Wrinkmore English, P/JX.136551 (Southsea).
- Petty Officer George Frost, D/J.98742 (Granton).
- Petty Officer Rigger John Gilmour, R/JX.166938.
- Petty Officer Anthony John Parker Hammond, P/JX.148347 (Malvern Links).
- Petty Officer Ernest Arthur James Holland, D/J.109637 (Truro).
- Petty Officer Leslie Walter Humphrey, C/JX.145765 (Ipswich).
- Petty Officer John Douglas Percy Jacobs, C/JX.143690 (Hunstanton).
- Petty Officer David Ellis Jones, LT/JX.198770 (Criccieth).
- Petty Officer Alfred Harold Leggett, P/J.107359 (Basingstoke).
- Petty Officer Henry William Lucas, LT/JX.189944 (Ashford, Kent).
- Petty Officer John Henry McNulty, D/SSX.12549 (Blackpool).
- Petty Officer Whyburn Parkes, D/JX.135812 (Castleford, Yorks).
- Petty Officer Frank Phillipson, C/JX.133699.
- Petty Officer Albert Ernest Pickett, C/JX.133549 (Gravesend).
- Petty Officer John Clifford Poole, C/JX.189200 (Richmond).
- Petty Officer Norman Stanley Redmond, LT/JX.212660 (Poole).
- Petty Officer Joseph Colin Sadler, D/J.97604.
- Petty Officer Archie Murray Salter, P/JX.125507 (Porchester).
- Petty Officer Alfred Richard Ernest Shreeve, LT/JX.181748 (Lowestoft).
- Petty Officer Francis Verrill, LT/JX.202267 (Whitby).
- Petty Officer Alexander Louvain Webber, D/JX.135793 (Glamorgan).
- Petty Officer William Whitehead, D/J.106211 (Devonport).
- Petty Officer Alfred John William Williams, P/JX.140902.
- Petty Officer Christopher Arthur Wood, LT/JX.224340 (Thornborough).
- Temporary Petty Officer George Auckland, C/JX.279578 (York).
- Temporary Petty Officer Leslie James Brown, P/JX.146405 (Portsmouth).
- Temporary Petty Officer Walter William Dean, P/J.95765 (Poole).
- Temporary Petty Officer David Lloyd Grimes, RCNVR, V.23126 (Westmount, Quebec).
- Temporary Petty Officer Arthur John Horne, D/J.109448 (Exeter).
- Temporary Petty Officer Albert Leonard Sheppard, P/J.100137 (Gosport).
- Temporary Petty Officer Harold Thomas South, D/JX.152225 (Bridgewater, Shropshire).
- Temporary Petty Officer (Coxswain) Isaac Edward Unthank, D/JX.155138 (Weymouth).
- Temporary Petty Officer Leopold David White, D/J.95655 (Birkenhead).
- Acting Petty Officer Robert Samuel Alexander Austin, D/SSX.27828 (South Shields).
- Acting Petty Officer Harry Arthur Moore, P/MX.126298 (London).
- Acting Petty Officer George Douglas Skinner, P/MX.635004 (Kirkcaldy).
- Acting Petty Officer Herbert Henry James Wade, P/JX.274173 (Henley-on-Thames).
- Temporary Acting Petty Officer Harold Stanley Alderson, D/JX.200336 (Manchester).
- Temporary Acting Petty Officer Kenneth Ashworth, D/MD/X.3058 (Birkenhead).
- Temporary Acting Petty Officer George Dickins, D/SSX.23389 (Sheffield).
- Temporary Acting Petty Officer Frank Vincent Dickinson, D/SSX.27602 (Altrincham).
- Temporary Acting Petty Officer John Elliot Grieve, P/JX.203189 (Glasgow).
- Temporary Acting Petty Officer Jack William Loader, P/JX.161860.
- Petty Officer Wireman Thomas Edmund Henry Butler, P/MX.66132 (Haverfordwest).
- Petty Officer Wireman Leslie Richard Hines, P/MX.62276 (Kislingbury, Northants).
- Yeoman of Signals Frank William Bridger, P/JX.144196 (Tynemouth).
- Yeoman of Signals Frank Edward Hall, C/JX.139158 (Gillingham).
- Yeoman of Signals Arthur Henry Koser, C/JX.132681 (Harrogate).
- Yeoman of Signals Donald James Mathias, D/JX.152820 (Newbury).
- Petty Officer Telegraphist Walter John Carro, D/JX.140200 (Barking, Essex).
- Petty Officer Telegraphist George Edward Claridge, P/JX.151522 (Bishopsthorpe).
- Petty Officer Telegraphist Robert Clarkson, D/JX.137574 (Wallsend-on-Tyne).
- Petty Officer Telegraphist John Hubert Noone Curling, P/SSX.20807 (Reading).
- Petty Officer Telegraphist Dennis Reginald Eagle, C/JX.139081 (Clacton-on-Sea).
- Petty Officer Telegraphist Kenneth Ellison, D/JX.133229.
- Petty Officer Telegraphist Ronald Cecil Victor Godley, P/JX.158221.
- Petty Officer Telegraphist Frederick James Mitchell, D/JX.134074 (Smethwick).
- Petty Officer Telegraphist Richard John Mitchell, C/J.95003.
- Petty Officer Telegraphist Sydney Edward Pinington, C/JX.144970 (Faversham).
- Petty Officer Telegraphist Herbert Quick, DSM, D/JX.138288 (The Lizard, Cornwall).
- Temporary Petty Officer Telegraphist Frank John Dunk Capeling, C/J.100529 (Norbury).
- Engine Room Artificer 4th Class Charles Walter Cofield, D/MX.64110 (Doncaster).
- Engine Room Artificer 4th Class John Edward Crumpton, D/MX.75849 (Bristol).
- Engine Room Artificer 4th Class David Charles Dennis, P/MX.78844.
- Engine Room Artificer 4th Class David Joseph Philpot, P/MX.66022 (Luton).
- Engine Room Artificer 4th Class Donald Tate, C/MX.97425 (East Ham).
- Air Artificer 4th Class Henry John Cooper, FAA/FX.100651 (South Norwood).
- Air Artificer 4th Class Tom Riding Littlewood, FAA/FX.77203 (Barnsley).
- Air Artificer 4th Class Roy Lionel Swain, FAA/FX.79381 (Southampton).
- Air Artificer 4th Class Eric Vincent, FAA/FX.81199 (Sherwood Rise, Notts.).
- Electrical Artificer 4th Class Edward Barrett, C/MX.92198 (London).
- Electrical Artificer 4th Class Arthur Edgar Lucas, P/MX.116684 (Poole).
- Electrical Artificer 4th Class George Peat Morris, D/MX.71624.
- Acting Electrical Artificer 4th Class James Hunter Allan, P/MX.503565 (Richarton, Kilmarnock).
- Acting Electrical Artificer 4th Class Jack Hall, P/MX.500528 (Sheffield).
- Acting Electrical Artificer 4th Class Alexander Taylor, C/MX.58916 (Peterhead, Aberdeen).
- Acting Ordnance Artificer 4th Class Jack Redmond Keeley, C/MX.96219 (Kendal).
- Stoker Petty Officer William Chares Bolch, P/KX.75804 (Lewes).
- Stoker Petty Officer Albert Chalcraft, C/KX.78742 (East Molesey).
- Stoker Petty Officer Thomas Douglas Francis Cross, C/KX.87782.
- Stoker Petty Officer Charles Alfred George, C/KX.99532.
- Stoker Petty Officer Joseph Norman Gould, D/KX.80473 (Burton-on-Trent).
- Stoker Petty Officer Henry William Jacobs, C/K.47778 (Deal).
- Stoker Petty Officer Thomas Henry Jeffery, P/KX 76380 (Littlehampton).
- Stoker Petty Officer Walter Frederick Nunn, P/KX.78291 (Liverpool).
- Stoker Petty Officer Matthew O'Neill, D/KX.86134 (Burnley).
- Stoker Petty Officer William Raspin, C/K.17590 (Watford).
- Stoker Petty Officer Joseph Robson, C/K.62509.
- Stoker Petty Officer James Alfred Sams, P/KX.82237.
- Stoker Petty Officer Ernest Walter Walker, C/K.22043.
- Stoker Petty Officer Edward Waylett, C/K.13345.
- Stoker Petty Officer Albert Edward Weller, D/K.63527.
- Stoker Petty Officer Charles William Wise, C/KX.75123.
- Stoker Petty Officer Leslie Wood, DSM, P/KX.83529 (Castleford, Yorks).
- Temporary Acting Stoker Petty Officer Thomas Joseph Haldon Davies, D/KX.95354 (Devonport).
- Petty Officer Motor Mechanic Thomas Hulme, P/MX.770&5.
- Petty Officer Motor Mechanic Ronald Inger, P/MX.99401 (Nottingham).
- Petty Officer Motor Mechanic Reginald Oscar Wilson Ives, P/MX.99402 (Woolwich).
- Petty Officer Motor Mechanic Arthur Thomas Northcote, C/MX.116874.
- Petty Officer Motor Mechanic Frederick Thomas Roberts, P/MX.79467 (Chepstow, Monmouth).
- Petty Officer Ordnance Mechanic Reginald Stephen Tomlin, P/MX.116279.
- Petty Officer Air Mechanic (E) Patrick Joseph Thomas McEvoy, FAA/FX.82724 (Dunblane).
- Petty Officer Air Mechanic (E) Morgan Henry Williams, FAA/FX.80198 (Bere Ferrers, Devon).
- Petty Officer Radio Mechanic Richard Ernest Charles Burford, D/MX.117249 (New Cross).
- Petty Officer Radio Mechanic Dennis Sidney Thomas Lawler, P/MX.116318 (Harold Wood, Essex).
- Petty Officer Radio Mechanic Donald Lund, FAA/FX.607228 (Middlesbrough).
- Petty Officer Radio Mechanic William James Smith, P/MX.124373.
- Temporary Petty Officer Radio Mechanic Cyril Rees Prosser, P/MX.116074 (Pengan).
- Acting Petty Officer Radio Mechanic (W) Lawrence Walter Fozard, P/MX.125647 (London, E.12).
- Acting Petty Officer Radio Mechanic Leonard Frederick Charles Shilham, P/MX.125448 (Pinner).
- Engineman Edwin Atkinson, LT/KX.128064 (Hull).
- Wartime Engineman Robert Broomhead, LT/KX.135913 (Grimsby).
- Wartime Engineman John James Buck, LT/KX.104782 (Edinburgh).
- Petty Officer Engineman William Arthur Canty, LT/KX.144352 (Harlow).
- Petty Officer Engineman Jack Jacob Cotton, LT/KX.160104 (Freshwater, Isle of Wight).
- Engineman Thomas William Harrison, LT/KX.131101 (Grimsby).
- Engineman David Alfred Henrickson, LT/KX.124989 (Grimsby).
- Engineman William Jappy, LT/X.422EU (Buckie).
- Engineman Fred Kay, LT/KX.102435 (Coventry).
- Engineman William Henry Lloyd, LT/X.75414 (St. Paul's Cray, Kent).
- Engineman Robert Alfred McCarron, LT/KX.156101 (Liverpool).
- Engineman John Reid, LT/KX.160095 (Avoch, Ross-shire).
- Wartime Engineman Alfred Harry Sparkes, LT/KX.110497 (Reedham, Norfolk).
- Engineman Edward Stephens, LT/KX.106203 (Manchester).
- Engineman George Watson, LT/X.359EU (Lossiemouth).
- Donkeyman Donald Ferguson, NAP/R.225131 (Glasgow).
- Plumber Robert Ridler, NAP/R.197183.
- Painter 1st Class Francis John Cecil Moore, D/MX.45044 (Weymouth).
- Temporary Sick Berth Petty Officer Donald Edwin Grant, P/MX.52602 (Marlborough).
- Temporary Sick Berth Petty Officer Sidney Redin, C/SBR.X.7747.
- Petty Officer Writer Athelstan Leslie Sargeant, P/PD/X.52/Co (Oxford).
- Temporary Petty Officer Writer John Malcolm Darwent, D/MX.81194 (Liverpool).
- Stores Petty Officer William Glynda Burden, C/MX.63722.
- Stores Petty Officer John Henry Denley, D/MX.47160 (St. Budeaux).
- Stores Petty Officer Andrew Smith, P/MX.71603 (Aberdeen).
- Temporary Stores Petty Officer Leonard Edward Dane Baskerville, C/KX.106470 (Twickenham).
- Temporary Stores Petty Officer Douglas Frederick Ellis, P/MX.57916 (Slough).
- Temporary Stores Petty Officer Ronald Edward Holt, C/CH/DX.87 (Ipswich).
- Temporary Stores Petty Officer Frederick Charles Hooper, C/MX.80246 (Wellingborough).
- Temporary Stores Petty Officer David Purdie, BEM, C/MX.72522 (Glasgow).
- Temporary Stores Petty Officer William Thomas Treece, D/MX.57053 (Plymouth).
- Petty Officer Cook (O) Ernest Gilbert Gill, D/L.14352.
- Petty Officer Cook Henry Holdforth, P/MX.49831 (Portsmouth).
- Petty Officer Cook (S) Charles James Phillips, C/MX.48410.
- Petty Officer Cook (S) Albert Henry George White, P/MX.49045 (Portsmouth).
- Temporary Petty Officer Cook (S) James Israel Balchin, P/MX.45020 (Portsmouth).
- Temporary Petty Officer Cook William Alfred Crockett, C/MX.66592 (Aylesbury).
- Temporary Petty Officer Cook (S) Albert Jennings, P/MX.46752.
- Bandmaster 2nd Class Ernest George Margetts, R.M.B.3077 (Dorking).
- Sergeant Godfrey Oswald Phillips, RM, Ch.X.715 (Bury St. Edmunds).
- Corporal (Acting Temporary Sergeant) Arthur Henry Lindsay, RM, Po.X.2509 (Edgeworth).
- Leading Seaman Bertram Elihu Bartlett, C/JX.181442.
- Leading Seaman Archibald Herbert Bates, D/J.111081 (Hove).
- Leading Seaman James Douglas Harold Beardmore, LT/JX.242123 (West Bromwich).
- Wartime Leading Seaman George Henry Bullard, LT/JX.170613 (Fowey).
- Leading Seaman William Couch, D/J.22662 (St. Budeaux).
- Wartime Leading Seaman James Whyte Dawson, LT/JX.262005 (Kirriemuir).
- Leading Seaman Charles George Edwards, LT/JX.222800.
- Leading Seaman George Emerson, LT/JX.200853 (Scarborough).
- Leading Seaman Arthur Robert King, P/JX.315885 (Walthamstow).
- Leading Seaman William Henry Knight, LT/JX.206548 (Chatham).
- Leading Seaman John Henry David Harris, LT/JX.225795.
- Leading Seaman James Thornton Hart, LT/JX.180451 (Gravesend).
- Leading Seaman Trevor James Hayes, D/SSX.27573 (Swansea).
- Leading Seaman George Leiper, LT/JX.219464 (Aberdeen).
- Wartime Leading Seaman Sidney Lewis, LT/JX.181784 (Hull).
- Leading Seaman George Lofthouse, P/J.24129 (Hounslow).
- Wartime Leading Seaman William MacFarlane, LT/JX.280235 (Tarbert, Argyll).
- Leading Seaman Donald MacLennan, LT/JX.265162 (Stornoway).
- Leading Seaman John Geddes Murray, LT/JX.177021 (Buckle).
- Leading Seaman James Murray, LT/JX.20828 (Buckie).
- Leading Seaman Reginald Henry Menyena, D/JX.145329 (Edinburgh).
- Leading Seaman Patrick Terence O'Connor, LT/JX.190066 (Exeter).
- Leading Seaman Jack Thompson Palmer, D/J.111567 (Birmingham).
- Leading Seaman Walter Leonard Flatten, LT/JX.170553 (Hull).
- Leading Seaman Frederick George Rackham, LT/JX.225167 (Grimsby).
- Leading Seaman Alexander Reid, LT/JX.265444 (Macduff).
- Leading Seaman Daniel Robertson, D/J.84476 (Bere Alston).
- Leading Seaman Ronald Taylor, P/JX.169661 (Worthing).
- Leading Seaman Dennis John Gordon Tillet, P/JX.271617 (London, S.E.17).
- Wartime Leading Seaman Sydney Arthur Whelpton, LT/JX.229398 (Grimsby).
- Temporary Leading Seaman Joseph Colquhoun, P/JX.289662 (Kilniarnock).
- Temporary Leading Seaman Harry Walter Emerson, C/JX.195335.
- Temporary Leading Seaman Richard Alfred Hellens, LT/JX.278578.
- Temporary Leading Seaman Alexander Francis Kydd, P/JX.278189.
- Acting Leading Seaman Ronald Victor Batten, D/JX.159715 (Exeter).
- Acting Leading Seaman (Coxswain) Eric Hindley, P/SR.8721 (Hull).
- Acting Leading Seaman Frank Surplice, D/JX.131296 (Birmingham).
- Temporary Acting Leading Seaman David William Appleton, D/JX.250078 (Par, Cornwall).
- Temporary Acting Leading Seaman Alfred Eric Victor Aplin, P/SSX.26289 (St. John's, Newfoundland).
- Temporary Acting Leading Seaman Harold Edward Boulding, C/JX.212141 (Kennington).
- Temporary Acting Leading Seaman James Burke, C/JX.247788 (Manchester).
- Temporary Acting Leading Seaman Robert Calvert, D/JX.192975 (Preston).
- Temporary Acting Leading Seaman James William Clark, C/JX.216608 (Highbury).
- Temporary Acting Leading Seaman Harold Cracknell, D/JX.265739 (Wiston, Yorks).
- Temporary Acting Leading Seaman Arthur Stanley Cressy, C/JX.239490 (Southall).
- Temporary Acting Leading Seaman Clarence Albert Davis, P/JX.224071 (Rothwell).
- Temporary Acting Leading Seaman William Duckworth, C/JX.226873 (Nottingham).
- Temporary Acting Leading Seaman Thomas William Jackson, P/JX.176333.
- Temporary Acting Leading Seaman William McLeod, P/CDX.2955 (Glasgow).
- Temporary Acting Leading Seaman Daniel Murren, C/JX.169651 (Glasgow).
- Temporary Acting Leading Seaman James Francis Orr, P/SSX.25280 (Manchester).
- Temporary Acting Leading Seaman Walter Thomas Ovenden, C/JX.212290 (Tipton, Staffs).
- Temporary Acting Leading Seaman Frederick Ronald Platt, P/JX.384654.
- Temporary Acting Leading Seaman Bernard Joseph Swift, D/JX.214353 (Liverpool).
- Temporary Acting Leading Seaman Reginald Herbert Waller, C/JX.204113 (Edmonton).
- Temporary Acting Leading Seaman Walter James White, P/JX.326595 (London).
- Temporary Acting Leading Seaman Reginald Charles Henry Whitehead, D/J.101782 (Bridgwater).
- Leading Wireman Richard Bird, C/MX.92320 (Edinburgh).
- Leading Wireman Leslie Bowden, C/MX.118360 (Manchester).
- Leading Wireman Jack Nathan Brayshaw, C/MX.69268 (Wanstead).
- Leading Wireman Kenneth Roy Gammons, C/MX.90782.
- Leading Wireman Arthur William Gibbs, C/MX.96916 (Hayes).
- Leading Wireman Gwilym Jones, D/MX.103431.
- Leading Wireman Cecil William Alfred Leech, C/MX.77413 (Ilford).
- Leading Signalman William Cox, C/JX.143573 (Gorleston-on-Sea).
- Leading Signalman Lyn Holbrook, C/JX.169993 (Southend-on-Sea).
- Leading Signalman John Septimus Strand, C/SSX.25678 (Hebburn-on-Tyne).
- Leading Signalman Edward Weir, D/J.112219 (Liverpool).
- Leading Signalman Alfred William Woodcock, C/JX.232599 (Westcliff-on-Sea).
- Leading Telegraphist Frank Ellis, D/J.54056 (Torquay).
- Leading Telegraphist Gordon Roland Short, P/JX.142830 (Portsmouth).
- Leading Telegraphist Michael Henry Murphy, D/JX.150100 (Rosyth).
- Leading Telegraphist Eric Clifford Pattimore, P/SSX.33333 (Guernsey).
- Leading Telegraphist James Huitson Sproates, C/JX.153040 (Blackball Colliery, Durham).
- Temporary Leading Telegraphist George Wilson Downs, P/SSX.31382 (Sunderland).
- Temporary Leading Telegraphist Ronald Victor Parsons, C/JX.143925 (Gillingham).
- Temporary Leading Telegraphist Stanley Cyril Wareham, P/JX.171871 (London).
- Acting Leading Telegraphist William Simmons, RCNVR. V.26082 (Victoria, B.C.).
- Leading Coder Peter John Lay, D/JX.356007 (London, S.E.8).
- Temporary Leading Coder Derek Summers Carr, D/JX.293373 (Dudley, Worcs.).
- Leading Stoker Clifford Henry Allen, P/KX.97481 (Runcorn).
- Leading Stoker William Henry Harvey, D/KX.98294 (Salcombe).
- Leading Stoker William Verdun Llewellyn, P/KX.107456 (Goodwick, Pembs.).
- Leading Stoker Ronald McAdam, D/KX.118453 (Liverpool).
- Leading Stoker Lloyd Angus Martin, RCNVR. V.1603 (Hopefield, P.E.I.).
- Leading Stoker Daniel Murphy, D/KX.80644.
- Leading Stoker John Quinn, P/K.66906.
- Wartime Leading Stoker Frederick Ward, LT/KX.136044 (Middlesbrough).
- Leading Stoker Raymond Victor Wildgoose, D/KX.97580 (Bristol).
- Temporary Leading Stoker Herbert Daley, D/KX.97502 (Burnley).
- Temporary Leading Stoker Trevor Jones, D/KX.81496 (Wrexham).
- Temporary Leading Stoker James Arthur Worboyds, P/KX.100727.
- Temporary Acting Leading Stoker Colin Harold Daniel Hobbs, D/KX.104212 (Stourbridge, Glos.).
- Acting Temporary Leading Stoker Alexander Kilpatrick, C/KX.120870 (Irvine, Ayrshire).
- Temporary Acting Leading Stoker John Robert Simpson, D/SS.118989 (Melnathorpe, Kinross-shire).
- Temporary Acting Leading Stoker James Silvester Strick, D/K.66266 (Madron Heamoor, Cornwall).
- Electrical Mechanic 5th Class Jonathan William Bennett, C/MX.95646 (Kendal).
- Leading Motor Mechanic Kenneth Mundy, C/MX.501196.
- Acting Temporary Leading Air Mechanic (A) Robert Hill, FAA/FX.90006 (Castleford, Yorks.).
- Temporary Leading Air Mechanic (A) Alfred Eric Dolling, FAA/FX.93939 (Chesterfield).
- Acting Leading Air Mechanic William John Willett, FAA/SFX.2757 (Coventry).
- Leading Radio Mechanic Ralph Taylor Bog, P/MX.572435.
- Blacksmith 4th Class Patrick Harold Garrett, D/MX.90988 (Millbrook).
- Leading Writer Arthur Spedding Lowe, C/MX.70945 (Atherton).
- Temporary Leading Writer Percy Cyril Squires, P/MX.80369 (Hazelgrove, near Stockport).
- Leading Stores Assistant John Bernard Stiles, D/MX.82705 (Kettering).
- Leading Cook John Harris Davies, D/MX.73180 (Spennymoor).
- Leading Cook (S) Frank Alfred Ellis, P/MX.94888 (Cleckheaton, Yorks).
- Leading Cook (S) Norman Hale, D/MX.80899 (New Eltham).
- Leading Cook Arthur Lawrence, LT/MX.85225 (London).
- Leading Cook Percy William Woodsford, D/MX.64303 (Alton Pancras).
- Leading Steward John Louis Davidson, LT/LX.32097 (Newcastle).
- Leading Steward John Penrose, P/LX.25497 (London).
- Temporary Leading Steward Leslie Walker, D/LX.26065 (Mansfield).
- Temporary Leading Steward William David Aitken, D/LX.24981.
- Greaser George William White, NAP/R.118582 (Southampton).
- Diesel Greaser Harry William Arthur Fowles, NAP/R.29339 (Southampton).
- Corporal (Temporary) William Henry Honey, RM, Po.X.103167 (London).
- Junior Electrician Bernard Leslie Banfield, NAP/R.293899 (Ashingdon, Essex).
- Acting Able Seaman William Ernest George Abramson, P/JX.268467 (Oxford).
- Acting Able Seaman Frederick George Adams, C/JX.235760 (Leiston, Suffolk).
- Able Seaman Ronald Arrowsmith, C/JX.236932 (Park Gate, Cheshire).
- Able Seaman Harold Frederick Blackwell, D/JX.189115 (Gravesend).
- Acting Able Seaman Joseph Boyes, D/JX.249141 (Manchester).
- Able Seaman Henry Buckley, D/JX.365204 (Birkenhead).
- Able Seaman Robert Darrock Campbell, C/JX.235306 (Glasgow).
- Acting Able Seaman Benjamin William Cannell, C/JX.265653 (Chingford).
- Able Seaman Robert Bell Christian, D/JX.184252 (Port Erin, Isle of Man).
- Able Seaman Frederick Williams Collins, C/J.108166.
- Acting Able Seaman George Arthur Collins, P/JX.289177 (Birmingham).
- Acting Able Seaman Leslie Douglas Coulter, C/SR.148 (Chatham).
- Acting Able Seaman Harry Storey Cresswell, P/JX.236664 (Leeds).
- Acting Able Seaman Selwyn Dobbs, D/JX.289583 (Neath).
- Acting Able Seaman Donald Dumbreck, D/JX.349280 (Glasgow).
- Acting Able Seaman Albert Henry Eaton, D/JX.255222.
- Able Seaman Frank Joseph Fletcher, C/JX.317962 (Sheffield).
- Able Seaman John Kenneth Fletcher, P/SSX.28640 (Saltburn).
- Able Seaman Claud Bertram Fry, D/JX.257414 (Sanderstead).
- Able Seaman Arthur Edward Fullick, P/JX.325283 (London, S.W.6).
- Able Seaman Henry Edward Hammill, D/JX.364976 (Glasgow).
- Able Seaman Jolhn Thomas Hart, P/JX.384758 (Rotherham).
- Able Seaman Frank Stanyer Hewlett, P/JX.276494 (Pluckley, Kent).
- Able Seaman Cecil Reginald Higgins, D/J.70884 (Plymouth).
- Acting Able Seaman Ernest Hill, P/JX.265916 (Barnsley).
- Able Seaman Cyril Holt, D/JX.284697 (Haywood, Lanes.).
- Acting Able Seaman George Henry Hudson, P/JX.263659 (Brockley, S.E.).
- Able Seaman Frederick Eves, C/JX.398369 (London).
- Able Seaman Austin James Janes, P/JX.208915 (Noggy Bay, Newfoundland).
- Able Seaman Walter George Law, D/JX.185016.
- Able Seaman Douglas Lewis, D/JX.239134 (Warrington).
- Able Seaman Percy Ronald Lowry, P/JX.383240 (Leeds).
- Able Seaman William Walter Luxton, D/JX.153983 (Bangor, Northern Ireland).
- Able Seaman William Thomas Moppett, P/J.95705 (Brighton).
- Able Seaman Arthur Albert Murray, C/JX.300998 (Catford).
- Able Seaman William Ronald Newsum, P/JX.247745 (Long Eaton).
- Able Seaman Leonard Richard Northam, D/J.93153 (Bringhome, Yorks.).
- Able Seaman Kenneth Frederick Poole, P/JX.324188 (Wolstanton).
- Able Seaman William Sidney Ernest Pearce, C/JX.542200 (Harrow).
- Able Seaman Joseph Pellington, P/JX.516036 (Newcastle-under-Lyme).
- Able Seaman Eric Penkethman, C/JX.204447 (Manchester).
- Able Seaman Robert Pye, D/JX.345971 (St. Helens).
- Acting Able Seaman Herbert William Rampling, C/JX.37444 (Ipswich).
- Acting Able Seaman Wilfred George Reynolds, P/JX.289152 (Seven Kings).
- Acting Able Seaman Arthur Robinson, C/JX.255446 (Hucknall, Notts.).
- Able Seaman Geoffrey Venables Rowland, C/JX.240171 (Stroud).
- Acting Able Seaman James Ross, C/JX.291840 (Bowness).
- Able Seaman Clifford Wright Scott, P/JX.282724 (Halifax).
- Able Seaman Lawrence Scott, RCNVR. V.10747 (Regina, Sask.).
- Able Seaman Norman Scholes, C/JX.260875 (Manchester).
- Able Seaman William Ross Sutherland, D/JX.257688 (Aberdeen).
- Able Seaman Alec Tate, D/JX.420465 (Coventry).
- Able Seaman Arthur Douglas Twort, C/JX.203373 (London, S.E.11).
- Able Seaman Frederick Varty, D/JX.203104 (Alston, Cumberland).
- Able Seaman Harold George Venney, D/JX.255702 (Ely).
- Able Seaman Arthur Wheatley, P/J.99162.
- Able Seaman Percy Harold Whitehand, C/JX.147885.
- Wireman John Glyngwyn Jones, C/MX.68706 (London).
- Signalman Roy Edward Batchelor, P/JX.308340 (Edmonton).
- Signalman Alan George Froude, C/JX.573663 (Hemsworth, near Pontefract).
- Signalman Alfred Norman Hale, P/JX.278264.
- Signalman Leonard Hart, D/JX.203009.
- Signalman Daniel Lewis, P/JX.380893 (Downham, Kent).
- Signalman Allan James Swadkin, LT/JX.340205 (Sutton Coldfield).
- Signalman Victor Yates, P/JX.322594 (Chorley).
- Telegraphist Douglas Donaldson, P/JX.454006 (Edinburgh).
- Telegraphist Andrew Hall, P/JX.204059 (Wellington Quay, Northumberland).
- Telegraphist Jack McLean Harper, LT/JX.331161 (Johnstone, Renfrewshire).
- Coder William Henry Bell, D/JX.615479 (Liverpool).
- Coder Percival Albert Birch, D/JX.207642 (Totnes).
- Coder Alec James Farquhar, P/JX.293800 (Sheffield).
- Coder Joseph Henry Gill, D/JX.272342 (Easingwold, Yorks.).
- Coder Dennis Hargreaves, D/JX.230281 (Colne).
- Stoker 1st Class Maurice Auburn, C/KX.154491 (Hitchin).
- Stoker 1st Class James Collins, D/KX.525129 (Galston, Ayrshire).
- Stoker 1st Class Frederick Sidney Arthur Buckland, C/KX.135196 (Potter's Bar).
- Stoker 1st Class David Adam Glen, C/KX.159133 (Bridgeton).
- Stoker 1st Class John Branford Hall, C/KX.127815.
- Stoker 1st Class Cyril Holmes, P/KX.101325 (Huddersfield).
- Stoker 1st Class George Edward Keal, LT/KX.131424 (Hull).
- Stoker 1st Class Henry James Levis, D/K.57931 (Skibbereen, Co. Cork).
- Stoker 1st Class Thomas McRae, R/300421 (Aberdeen).
- Stoker 1st Class Henry Thomas Roberts, P/KX.130148 (Hanwell).
- Stoker 1st Class Harold Scott, D/KX.121666 (Bath).
- Stoker 1st Class Sydney Thomas Sheath, P/KX.85705 (Southampton).
- Stoker 1st Class Herbert Stokes, P.64041 (Tisbury, Wilts.).
- Sick Berth Attendant Francis Patrick Armitage, P/MX.112379 (Huddersfield).
- Sick Berth Attendant Kenneth Blakemore, D/MX.100511 (Manchester).
- Writer Donald McKoy, C/CH/DX/40 (Gillingham).
- First Writer Hugh Robertson Ross, NAP/R.225390.
- Marine Gordon Edwin Hibberd, RM, Po.X.3855 (Portsmouth).
- Marine Walter Stanley Rose, RM, Ply.X.106563. L.C.S.(L)259.
- Ordinary Seaman Robert Douglas Barber, R/300344 (Maidstone).
- Ordinary Seaman Joseph Mostyn, P/JX.633726 (London, N.12).
- Ordinary Seaman John Pearson, D/JX.650133 (Hexham).
- Seaman Frank Bott, LT/JX.409945 (Chatham).
- Seaman Matthew Cecil Gumming, LT/JX.529382 (Shetland).
- Seaman William Endean, LT/JX.303108 (Potters Bar).
- Seaman Horace Hatch, LT/JX.173190 (Hull).
- Seaman Sylvester Hickey, LT/JX.662475.
- Seaman James Henry Herbert Knight, LT/JX.229253 (Romford).
- Seaman Robert Lees, LT/JX.514100 (Kelso).
- Seaman Joseph Macguirk, LT/JX.196123 (Annie Pit).
- Seaman Murdo Mackenzie, LT/X.80150 (Stomoway).
- Seaman Frank Margerison, LT/JX.321050 (Brampton).
- Seaman Wilfred Jack Mitchell, LT/JX.219665 (Cleethorpes).
- Seaman Henry Frederick Newberry, LT/JX.195967 (Lowestoft).
- Seaman James Richmond, LT/JX.202632 (Preston).
- Seaman George Joiner Ritchie, LT/JX.177013 (Whitehill, Banff).
- Seaman Peter Kenneth Wallace Setch, LT/JX.317226 (London, E.12).
- Seaman Stanley Smethurst, LT/JX.205502 (Swinton).
- Seaman Henry Edmund Stockwell, LT/JX.319185 (Acton).
- Seaman Samuel William Taylor, LT/JX.202198 (Wells-on-Sea).

Mention in Despatches (Posthumous)

- Leading Steward Albert Edward Riches, LT/LX.27771 (Great Yarmouth).

== Royal Air Force ==
Acting Air Marshal

- R. V. Goddard, CB, CBE.

Air Vice-Marshals

- R. S. Aitken, CBE, MC, AFC.
- J. W. Baker, CB, MC, DFC.
- B. McEntegart, CB, CBE.
- A. P. M. Sanders, CB, CBE.

Air Commodores

- V. B. Bennett, DFC.
- J. A. Boret, CBE, MC, AFC.
- J. M. Mason, DFC, DSC.
- H. N. Thornton, MBE.
- F. N. Trinder, CBE.

Acting Air Commodores

- C. E. Benson.
- R. A. Chisholm, DSO, DFC.
- C. W. Dicken.
- J. H. Edwardes-Jones, CBE, DFC, AFC.
- H. E. Fenton, DSO, DFC.
- N. H. Fresson, DFC.
- A. J. W. Geddes, DSO, OBE.
- H. D. Jackman, CBE.
- D. W. Lane.
- F. B. Ludlow, CBE, MC.
- F. J. Murphy.
- A. W. B. McDonald, AFC.
- L. T. Pankhurst, CBE.
- F. L. Pearce, DSO, DFC.
- R. L. Phillips.
- J. R. Hallings-Pott, DSO, AFC.
- L. F. Sinclair, GC, CBE, DSO, ADC.
- R. N. Watte.

Group Captains

- G. N. Amison.
- P. W. Bale.
- F. E. P. Barrington.
- E. C. Bates, AFC.
- C. E. St. J. Beamish, DFC.
- A. J. Biggar.
- L. W. C. Bower, DFC.
- F. J. St. G. Braithwaite, OBE.
- E. J. P. Burling, DSC, DFC, AFC.
- A. E. Case, RAFO.
- H. H. Chapman.
- M. V. M. Clube, AAF.
- L. Crocker.
- E. J. P. Davy.
- H. R. A. Edwards, DFC, AFC.
- K. H. R. Elliot, DSO.
- H. A. Evans-Evans.
- B. G. Farrow, OBE.
- E. S. Finch.
- C. E. Foster, RAFVR.
- T. P. Cleave, CBE.
- Lord G. N. Douglas-Hamilton, OBE, AFC.
- P. I. Harris, DFC.
- J. G. Hawtrey, ADC.
- E. A. Healy.
- C. M. Heard.
- M. L. Heath.
- G. F. W. Heycock, DFC.
- H. E. Hills, OBE, AAF.
- J. W. Hunt.
- J. M. D. Ker.
- W. H. Kyle, DFC.
- R. H. A. Leigh.
- J. A. H. Louden.
- J. A. McDonald.
- J. D. Miller.
- R. J. P. Morris.
- C. G. J. Micolls, MB, BCh.
- F. E. Nuttall, OBE.
- M. D. Ommanney.
- W. E. Oulton, DSO, DFC.
- J. T. Paine.
- H. M. G. Parker.
- I. R. Parker, AAF.
- K. F. T. Pickles.
- J. H. Powle.
- G. H. Russell, DFC.
- A. V. Sawyer, DFC.
- R. H. Scott, AAF.
- J. H. Searby, DSO, DFC.
- J. B. Selby, DSO, DFC, RAFVR.
- G. Shaw, DFC, AAF.
- F. J. Sherman, RAFVR.
- J. C. Sisson, DFC, RAFO.
- V. R. Smith.
- J. E. R. Sowman.
- M. T. Spence, RAFVR.
- J. E. G. Thomas, DFC.
- J. M. Thompson, DSO, DFC.
- J. Warburton.
- E. R. Wood.
- A. B. Woodhall, OBE.
- B. C. Yarde.

Honorary Group Captain

- W. S. Allen, RAFVR.

Acting Group Captains

- H. M. Baker, BEM.
- P. G. Wykeham-Barnes, DSO, DFC.
- J. C. Barraclough, RAFO.
- A. H. Boyd, DSO, DFC, RAFO.
- H. P. Broad, DFC.
- C. Broughton.
- A. C. Brown, DSO, DFC.
- E. N. Clifton, RAFVR.
- A. E. Clouston, DSO, DFC, AFC.
- R. M. Coad, AFC, RAFO.
- K. R. Coates.
- T. C. Dickens.
- G. E. Gordon-Duff.
- C. S. Ellison.
- V. Fairfield.
- G. R. Scott-Farnie, RAFVR.
- G. A. C. Foster, DFC, AFC.
- L. Freeman.
- T. M. Horgan, DSO, DFC.
- G. F. Humphries, RAFO.
- L. A. Jackson, OBE.
- P. G. Jameson, DSO, DFC, RAFO.
- E. J. A. Knight.
- G. V. Lane, DFC, AFC, RAFO.
- C. W. M. Ling, DFC.
- J. C. E. Luard, RAFVR.
- D. S. MacDonald, DFC.
- J. McLaren, RAFVR.
- W. D. McPherson, OBE, RAFVR.
- T. G. Mapplebeck, RAFVR.
- S. J. Marchbank, DFC.
- W. R. Mayes, OBE, DSM, AFM.
- E. G. L. Millington, DFC.
- S. H. E. Mitchell, OBE.
- V. R. Moon, AFC, RAFO.
- P. B. B. Ogilvie, DSO, DFC.
- A. B. Olney.
- G. J. C. Paul, DFC.
- C. W. Pollock, RAFVR.
- T. G. E. Price, RAFO.
- P. J. A. Riddell.
- H. R. McL. Reid, DFC.
- B. Robinson.
- A. M. Rodgers.
- C. F. Sarsby.
- A. G. Stratford-Tuke.
- D. A. W. Sugden, OBE.
- G. C. Tomlinson, OBE, DFC.
- C. Turl, OBE, DSM.
- B. A. Vautier.
- E. G. Campbell-Voullaire, DFC, RAFO.
- R. G. Warden, RAFVR.
- S. G. Wise, DFC, RAFO.

Wing Commanders

- A. W. Alberry, MBE (35217).
- A. K. Allen (83141), RAFVR.
- C. C. Barker (23304), RAFO.
- B. Barthoed (33218).
- G. C. C. Bartlett, AFC (39022), RAFO.
- E. A. Biddle (21190).
- J. Black (85807), RAFVR.
- B. H. Boon (36045).
- I. H. Bowhill (77818), RAFVR.
- H. E. Brushwood, OBE (35059).
- F. E. Burton, DFC (37623), RAFO.
- C. A. Butler (37711).
- F. G. Carle (31072).
- B. Chadwell (21168).
- A. R. T. Coke (28216).
- A. E. Connolly (21099), RAFO.
- F. A. Coombs (43485), RAFVR.
- L. Davey (35101).
- P. W. A. Dudgeon (70934), RAFO.
- E. C. Durbin, MBE (28018), RAFVR.
- A. E. Eaton, DSO (75004), RAFVR.
- M. H. de L. Everest (34192), RAFO.
- J. N. W. Farmer, DFC (37316).
- A. N. Francombe (18210), RAFO.
- J. F. Fraser, DFC (70229), RAFVR.
- W. H. Geddes (35266).
- F. P. Gee (31149).
- W. B. W. Gracey (90020), AAF.
- D. H. M. Graham (31061).
- F. G. Hammond (35003), RAFO.
- A. J. Handley (39731), RAFO.
- G. H. Harrison (35093).
- M. C. Hassell, OBE, MC (90437), AAF.
- F. C. Hayward (21206).
- W. Higgs (31479).
- R. Hollingworth (75615), RAFVR.
- C. C. Howes (35198).
- F. W. Hudson (35366).
- F. W. Jenkins (35045).
- L. F. Jennings (43447), RAFVR.
- H. K. King (87132) RAFVR.
- W. H. King, OBE (35034).
- C. D. Layers, MBE (39118), RAFO.
- J. W. Martin (75181), RAFVR.
- L. G. Martin (22200), RAFO.
- L. Mathias (33270).
- D. Michell (33008).
- C. M. H. Outram (29247), RAFO.
- W. D. Peock (90365), AAF.
- E. F. Pippet (37119), RAFO.
- A. A. Quayle (21060).
- W. H. Rayner (77951), RAFVR.
- G. Robinson (31303).
- J. P. Scorgie, BEM (31189).
- J. Simpson (114909), RAFVR.
- D. G. Smith (23299).
- L. Spencer (35137).
- H. W. C. Springham (31033).
- W. G. Swanborough, MBE (35008).
- J. C. Taylor (23323).
- H. J. A. Thewles (37836), RAFO.
- A. C. Thorne (31113).
- P. S. Vallis (35348).
- J. G. Walser, MC (08171).
- L. A. Wear (31188).
- T. Wilson (35048).
- T. A. K. Wilson (71401), RAFO.
- J. W. Woolcock (90307), AAF.

Honorary Wing Commander

- M. Graham, RAFVR.

Chaplain

- The Rev. K. V. Ensor, RAFVR.

Acting Wing Commanders

- J. C. S. Ahern (72597), RAFVR.
- G. M. Allcock, DFC (36215), RAFO.
- C. F. Atkinson (33205).
- G. Baker (11020), RAFVR.
- S. Barr (72181), RAFVR.
- L. H. Bartlett, DSO (102959), RAFVR.
- H. R. M. Beall (39161).
- H. D. Bisley, AFC (43057).
- F. B. Blinkhorn (88758), RAFVR.
- G. A. Bone (43876).
- H. L. Bosworth (79076), RAFVR.
- J. A. T. Bowen (44613).
- T. Bradley (45530).
- E. A. Bradly (74592), RAFVR.
- E. R. Butcher (44642).
- R. W. Caeser (44579).
- J. R. Canham, DFC (40799), RAFO.
- R. R. Chapman (44863).
- H. J. Barton-Chapple (76081), RAFVR.
- E. C. Chesterton (75863), RAFVR.
- H. Clarke (43441).
- F. K. R. Coldstream (90701), AAF.
- F. H. Collingridge (110593), RAFVR.
- C. H. Collins (43733).
- W. M. Collins, DFC (43848).
- J. B. Conolly (31154).
- W. C. E. Craig, DFC (46341).
- T. D. Craven (90094), AAF.
- A. W. Crouchley (76376), RAFVR.
- H. V. Crowder (19212), RAFO.
- A. E. Dale, DFM (35232).
- A. W. Daniels (35022).
- D. J. Dawson (23310).
- M. D. Day (39413), RAFO.
- E. W. Deacon, DSO, DFC (44547).
- M. J. P. De Froberville (72358), RAFVR.
- D. J. Devitt (39434) RAFO.
- A. N. Dixon (84575), RAFVR.
- T. E. Dixon (104673), RAFVR.
- G. W. Dodds (44889).
- D. A. Doughty (72275), RAFVR.
- E. Earnshaw (101151), RAFVR.
- A. H. Edwards (72213), RAFVR.
- L. B. Ercolani, DSO (62270), RAFVR.
- P. C. P. Farnes, DFM (88437), RAFVR.
- D. I. Farquharson (75936), RAFVR.
- J. S. Farquharson (73757), RAFVR.
- A. G. C. Farrar (79024), RAFVR.
- R. A. Field (39277).
- F. G. Ferrier (24089), RAFO.
- F. J. K. Fleetwood (39380).
- L. J. Fletcher (74502), RAFVR.
- G. V. Forrest (109482), RAFVR.
- A. J. E. Forsyth (72833), RAFVR.
- E. W. Franklin (31492).
- R. E. Fraser (43728).
- M. M. Gardham (21328), RAFO.
- A. C. Gilmer (75495), RAFVR.
- Sir R. B. Graham (79643), RAFVR.
- E. F. Hales (43906).
- J. K. Hankinson (72848), RAFVR.
- J. F. H. Hargrave (74927), RAFO.
- E. R. Harley (81964), RAFVR.
- G. H. Harris (75779), RAFVR.
- G. Henderson (90045), AAF.
- R. C. Henry (43650).
- W. H. Herbert, MBE (44490).
- C. Hill, MC (85179), RAFVR.
- F. F. Howard (86159), RAFVR.
- C. Howells (44083).
- A. M. D. Howes (22194), RAFVR.
- H. J. Hyde (46065).
- L. L. Ingram (23339).
- C. G. James (77391), RAFVR.
- D. M. Jannaway (31279).
- J. Jewell (43392).
- H. A. S. Johnston, DFC (88723), RAFVR.
- S. H. Jordan, MBE (44839).
- B. L. Kearley (61127), RAFVR.
- G. T. Kelsey (83121), RAFVR.
- F. K. Kennedy (75016), RAFVR.
- W. R. A. Knocker (74333), RAFVR.
- J. H. Kynoch, DFC (40232).
- J. K. Lancaster (85904), RAFVR.
- H. M. Langley (81771), RAFVR.
- W. S. L. Lapidge (43386).
- J. N. C. Law (80590), RAFVR.
- H. R. Lawson, DFC, AFC (43121).
- J. A. Lennox (78219), RAFVR.
- F. Lord (43503).
- K. J. McDonald, DFC (39097), RAFO.
- F. V. MacLaine (23333).
- W. C. McNeil (22048), RAFO.
- W. McMenemy (87094), RAFVR.
- F. Mattar (107498), RAFVR.
- H. P. Matthews, OBE, BEM (43860).
- H. W. Merckel (86168), RAFVR.
- A. E. Miller (43585).
- W. E. Moss (47242).
- A. E. Munson (149651), RAFVR.
- J. W. New (18010).
- C. N. Foxley Norris (70225), RAFVR.
- E. F. J. Odoire, DFC, AFC (43139).
- E. C. Ormonde (75643), RAFVR.
- F. W. Palmer, VC, MM (87556), RAFVR.
- G. W. Petre, DFC (33353).
- D. B. Pinkney (76240), RAFVR.
- O. Plowright (102271), RAFVR.
- E. Plumtree, DFC (83716), RAFVR.
- A. M. R. Ramsden (44728).
- D. A. Reddick, DFC, AFC (43522).
- D. K. Redford (73049), RAFVR.
- K. B. Redmond (23385), RAFO.
- K. C. Roberts (70817), RAFO.
- J. L. Roche (23361), RAFO.
- J. R. S. Romanes, DFC (39202), RAFO.
- A. H. Rook, DFC, AFC (90071), AAF.
- D. C. Sandeman, DFC (81052), RAFVR.
- A. H. R. Sellar (79597), RAFVR.
- E. G. Sewell (89969), RAFVR.
- J. H. Sindall (37365), RAFO.
- A. E. Slocombe (40323), RAFO.
- F. V. Smith (79818), RAFVR.
- R. F. Fleming-Smith (84562), RAFVR.
- G. M. Somers (44321).
- J. N. Stagey, DFC (41217), RAFO.
- T. N. Stack (33455).
- E. E. Stammers (76057), RAFVR.
- E. A. Starling (70643), RAFO.
- D. W. Steventon, DSO, DFC (33477).
- A. C. Stewart, DFC (40151), RAFO.
- W. R. N. Sturdy, DFC (42906), RAFO.
- F. B. Sumerling (23097), RAFO.
- P. J. Sykes (82432), RAFVR.
- W. D. Symes (31248).
- E. D. Syson (78342), RAFVR.
- J. Scott-Taggart, MC (73518), RAFVR.
- L. W. Tee, MBE (44142).
- T. W. J. Temple (79421), RAFVR.
- W. A. H. Thomas (44393).
- H. Thompson, MBE (43438).
- W. J. C. Tonge (78364), RAFVR.
- M. A. Toomey (119082), RAFVR.
- S. E. Townson (46179).
- T. A. Trotter (41082), RAFO.
- J. C. Vickery (79017), RAFVR.
- T. A. Vigors, DFC (33554)
- W. Walster (45048).
- T. H. C. Wardlaw (88754), RAFVR.
- G. H. Wass (76383), RAFVR.
- P. H. Watts, DSO, DFC (43371).
- D. A. Watson (70715), RAF Regiment.
- P. H. Way, DFC (39645), RAFO.
- W. H. Westgate, MBE (44275).
- H. C. Westwood (44215).
- G. H. Wherry, DFC (39624), RAFO.
- A. E. White (73670) RAFVR.
- P. A. Wilkinson (23326), RAFO.
- A. Williams (72433), RAFVR.
- A. G. Wilson, DFC (70831), RAFO.
- E. C. Wolfe, DFC (37705), RAFO.
- J. P. M. Woolley (37489).
- H. L. Wright (132239), RAFVR.
- J. F. Wright (76947), RAFVR.

Squadron Leaders

- F. W. G. Aggett, MBE (35038).
- D. M. Alexander (131864), RAFVR.
- J. F. Alexander (85654), RAFVR.
- J. H. C. Albrecht (90345), AAF.
- R. F. Arnold (43586).
- J. Baines (86498), RAFVR.
- A. H. W. Ball, DSO, DFC (33532).
- W. E. Ballard (90599), AAF.
- J. F. R. Barker (69532), RAFVR.
- C. P. Bennett (90992), AAF.
- D. A. Berkett (21320), RAFO.
- N. Booth (75110), RAFVR.
- K. G. Brabner (79443), RAFVR.
- J. N. Britton (81759), RAFVR.
- R. Brown (45685).
- L. F. Bruce (108590), RAFVR.
- B. J. Bugden (66115), RAFVR.
- F. H. Bugge, AFC (08241), RAFO.
- E. R. Butler, DFC (108923), RAFVR.
- N. V. Carter (31425).
- J. G. Cave (39271).
- E. Chambers (132210), RAFVR.
- J. W. Chance (79652), RAFVR.
- M. A. Chappell (75275), RAFVR.
- M. R. Chassels (77090), RAFVR.
- W. Clarke (70132), RAFVR.
- G. P. Collier (74457), RAFVR.
- C. J. Collins (44466).
- V. R. V. Cooper (90367), AAF.
- F. W. J. Cottrell (118014), RAFVR.
- W. A. Covill (21294), RAFO.
- L. E. Crawley (74461), RAFVR.
- A. P. Crowley (45285).
- S. E. T. Cusdin (85456), RAFVR.
- H. Cutter (43445).
- W. C. P. Dale (72641), RAFVR.
- H. A. Daniell (75527), RAFVR.
- G. A. Darlow (73948), RAFVR.
- E. G. Done (102689), RAFVR.
- D. L. Doyle (77152), RAFVR.
- C. P. Drake (140001), RAFVR.
- K. M. Dunsford (83348), RAFVR.
- H. Edge (73812), RAFVR.
- J. S. Ellard (79014), RAFVR.
- M. O. F. England (73813), RAFVR.
- L. S. N. B. Faulkner, OBE (75937), RAFVR.
- F. G. Foot (40902).
- W. R. Foreman (23381), RAFO.
- W. M. S. Fox (90561), AAF.
- F. J. Frost (71325), RAFO.
- H. P. Game, AFC (74886), RAFO.
- W. T. Garratt (118291), RAF Regiment.
- P. B. Gilbert (45237).
- R. G. Goodfellow (78151), RAFVR.
- A. P. Gorrie (78514), RAFVR.
- S. G. Grainger (46681).
- E. A. Grant (73879), RAFVR.
- C. E. Gregory (73207), RAFVR.
- T. L. Grey (10099), RAFVR.
- G. L. Gryspeerdt (76143), RAFVR.
- R. Hadingham (40697), RAFO.
- G. Haigh (68921), RAFVR.
- H. G. Hanks (72299), RAFVR.
- C. H. G. Hart (69578), RAFVR.
- H. Hilliard (67572), RAFVR.
- W. C. Hoey (40706), RAFO.
- P. Honey (35231).
- E. Howett (72413), RAFVR.
- L. D. A. Hussey (87314), RAFVR.
- C. J. K. Hutchins (37177).
- A. H. Jack (78652), RAFVR.
- D. C. James (72867), RAFVR.
- W. L. James (83676), RAFVR.
- T. E. Bangor-Jones (82460), RAFVR.
- T. S. B. Kelly, MB, ChB, LRCP&S, LRFP&S (72070), RAFVR.
- H. F. Knight (44213).
- A. H. Knowles (31229).
- C. J. Lawrence (76497), RAFVR.
- R. Leaning (10606), RAFVR.
- T. R. Leatherdale (70390), RAFO.
- F. W. Lee (72693), RAFVR.
- J. D. St. C. Olliff-Lee (90218), AAF.
- R. A. Little (72142), RAFVR.
- C. R. Lliffe (31227).
- J. D. Loughnan (79246), RAFVR.
- J. H. McElney (75392), RAFVR.
- R. E. McKenzie, MB, ChB (79346), RAFVR.
- A. Macnicol (82893), RAFVR.
- D. H. G. MacQuaide (83658), RAFVR.
- S. C. Macey (71352), RAFO.
- D. J. Marler (31341), RAFO.
- E. H. B. Martin (81179), RAFVR.
- P. Meston (33297).
- C. J. Miln (77541). RAFVR.
- C. E. Milner (129586), RAFVR.
- F. V. Morris (101700), RAFVR.
- H. W. Morton (41945), RAFO.
- L. R. Mouatt (28159).
- J. B. Murphy (70933), RAFO.
- H. Nelson (75866), RAFVR.
- R. M. Nisbet (91153), AAF.
- E. A. Pacello (31493).
- C. D. Palmer (05077).
- W. E. Palmer (43875)
- L. G. Patmore (87096), RAFVR.
- B. E. Peck, DFC (40481).
- F. H. Peers (70531), RAFO.
- J. H. Penny (86726), RAFVR.
- A. G. Peters (43209).
- C. E. Plummer (72498), RAFVR.
- J. Pirie (21316).
- R. P. Potgieter (39754), RAFO.
- J. F. Powell (73348), RAFVR.
- R. Y. Powell (45714).
- J. A. Pring, OBE (75220), RAFVR.
- R. E. Pritchard (145365), RAFVR.
- M. C. Rawlence (78107), RAFVR.
- W. J. Reason (75743), RAFVR.
- F. H. V. Robinson (62728), RAFVR.
- L. Robinson (43735).
- D. W. Rowson (36218).
- A. W. Ruffell (70786), RAFO.
- C. St. Leger-Brightman (76266), RAFVR.
- L. G. Scott (89703), RAFVR.
- J. A. C. Scoular (46185).
- F. C. Seldon (76259), RAFVR.
- E. H. Sillince (44885).
- G. F. Simpson (104378), RAFVR.
- R. Stevenson (40760), RAFO.
- W. L. Stevenson (119317), RAFVR.
- E. M. Stewart (70650), RAFO.
- R. W. Stewart (72097), RAFVR.
- A. G. Stringer (76106), RAFVR.
- E. Swale, DFC (74573), RAFVR.
- K. W. Swann (50889).
- A. R. Taylor (104027), RAFVR.
- G. E. Terry (60717), RAFVR.
- J. Terry (50621), RAFVR.
- G. E. Thomas (87723), RAFVR.
- J. L. Thrussell, MBE (44202).
- T. G. Tindale (119492), RAFVR.
- G. W. Tookey (77328), RAFVR.
- R. M. Tothill (78003), RAFVR.
- W. H. Trickett (80596), RAFVR.
- C. J. Van Den Bergh (65425), RAFVR.
- M. Vlasto, DFC (108232), RAFVR.
- H. G. Vyse (76451), RAFVR.
- F. Walker (46273).
- B. Weil (83326), RAFVR.
- S. C. Williamson (74580), RAFVR.
- C. C. Willott (43566).
- A. Sidney-Wilmot (79439), RAFVR.
- R. F. Zobel (140505), RAFVR.

Chaplains

- The Rev. D. G. Benson.
- The Rev. G. H. C. Church, RAFVR.
- The Rev. W. Fearn.
- The Rev. R. C. O. Goodchild, RAFVR.
- The Rev. R. S. Hawkins, RAFVR.
- The Rev. A. S. Ireson, RAFVR.
- The Rev. I. E. Douglas-Jones, RAFVR.
- The Rev. W. R. C. Joyce, RAFVR.
- The Rev. F. Morgan, RAFVR.
- The Rev. J. K. Page, RAFVR.
- The Rev. J. Parker, RAFVR.
- The Rev. K. C. Phillips, RAFVR.
- The Rev. B. F. J. Plumley, RAFVR.
- The Rev. W. A. Rhodes, RAFVR.
- The Rev. T. I. Robinson, RAFVR.
- The Rev. S. A. Sheppard, RAFVR.
- The Rev. G. H. Sully, RAFVR.
- The Rev. R. O. Tasker, RAFVR.
- The Rev. J. J. Winstanley, RAFVR.

Honorary Squadron Leader

- A. Charlesby (71125), RAFO.

Acting Squadron Leaders

- H. Adcock, OBE (82314), RAFVR.
- E. G. N. Amies (103623), RAFVR.
- A. F. Amor (46412).
- H. E. Arnholz (87756), RAFVR.
- R. Y. Ashley, DFC (79744), RAFVR.
- E. W. S. Austin (46584).
- R. B. Austin (100677), RAFVR.
- S. C. Baker (45164).
- W. M. Barber (77859), RAFVR.
- B. D. Barker, DFC (129452), RAFVR.
- C. A. Barnes, DFC (62268), RAFVR.
- S. P. S. Bartlett (78883), RAFVR.
- J. H. Bartram (110898), RAFVR.
- C. J. Bayley (77325), RAFVR.
- H. Beattie (45311).
- A. E. Beeson (108536), RAFVR.
- P. Bennett (104738), RAFVR.
- R. H. Bennett (76500), RAFVR.
- E. J. Blair (81864), RAFVR.
- G. T. Block (44326).
- W. J. Blomfield (115667), RAFVR.
- N. M. Bode (134519), RAFVR.
- K. F. P. Bond (40666), RAFO.
- G. S. Bosworth (80586), RAFVR.
- A. Bourne (81755), RAFVR.
- C. H. Boutflower (109532), RAFVR.
- J. D. Bowen (43315).
- R. S. L. Bowker (65622).
- V. P. Brooks (77257), RAFVR.
- R. H. C. Brousson (73182), RAFVR.
- C. J. Brown (68295), RAFVR.
- F. Brown (46457), RAFVR.
- V. P. Brown (79758), RAFVR.
- R. A. Browne (119835), RAFVR.
- C. E. Bryant, DSO (80915), RAFVR.
- G. Buckley (91190), AAF.
- N. B. Buckley, DFC (48371), RAFO.
- H. H. Bull (81115), RAFVR.
- T. F. Bullus (77431), RAFVR.
- P. B. Burnett (60850), RAFVR.
- J. W. Burrough, DFC (104370).
- D. Burrows (79750), RAFVR.
- S. R. H. Cadier (111386), RAFVR.
- W. S. H. Cairns (65415), RAFVR.
- P. D. Carden, DFC (84316), RAFVR.
- J. R. A. Careless, DFC (43263).
- R. Carfrae (68225), RAFVR.
- H. E. Carris (11.2669), RAFVR.
- R. H. Carson (103060), RAFVR.
- H. J. Carter, DFC (104474), RAFVR.
- J. Carter (113409), RAFVR.
- D. P. Cartwright (82324), RAFVR.
- R. C. F. Carver (88192), RAFVR.
- W. C. Caswell (89446), RAFVR.
- E. J. K. Chapman (120819), RAFVR.
- R. R. Chapman (44863), RAF Regiment.
- P. N. Charles (88935), RAFVR.
- A. V. R. N. Chart (45367).
- W. G. Cheesman (68865), RAFVR.
- G. D. Cheyne (87480), RAFVR.
- J. S. Chown (46593).
- J. G. Clark (113408), RAFVR.
- S. E. Clark (102677), RAFVR.
- S. G. Clarke (102780), RAFVR.
- A. S. Clarkson (47429), RAFVR.
- E. W. Claydon (79584), RAFVR.
- C. W. D. Cole (89036), RAFVR.
- F. W. Collins (113796), RAFVR.
- G. F. Collins (81189), RAFVR.
- M. F. Comer (77540), RAFVR.
- R. M. Comber (116127), RAFVR.
- C. Conroy (123876), RAFVR.
- E. Cook (126087), RAFVR.
- A. H. L. Cooper (87766), RAFVR.
- G. R. Cooper, DFC (87072), RAFVR.
- H. J. Cooper (130584), RAFVR.
- A. R. Cottle (87516), RAFVR.
- G. J. Craig (74788), RAFVR.
- W. H. Crittle (46096).
- W. R. Crofts, DFM (46177).
- B. E. D. Cuddon (79312), RAFVR.
- F. J. S. Culley (106973), RAFVR.
- H. V. Dacombe (114188), RAFVR.
- J. S. M. Dagnall (123900), RAFVR.
- G. Davidson (44034).
- H. F. Davis (44840).
- W. R. Deacon (64963), RAFVR.
- C. A. Deakin, AFM (46267).
- V. H. Dean (118427), RAFVR.
- E. D. Deane (44443).
- C. F. De Hamel (79314), RAFVR.
- F. R. Derry, DFC (87862), RAFVR.
- C. H. C. Down (48055).
- D. S. Downs (85460), RAFVR.
- T. W. Dowson (118982), RAFVR.
- G. A. Draycott (118997), RAFVR.
- K. G. C. Eaves (119543), RAFVR.
- E. L. Eldridge (82079), RAFVR.
- S. G. P. Ellender (47046).
- H. D. Elliott (88625), RAFVR.
- G. J. Evans (73952), RAFVR.
- H. C. Evans (44379).
- L. V. Evans (85386), RAFVR.
- S. R. Evans (86056), RAFVR.
- V. C. Ewens (44290).
- E. A. Fairhurst, DFC (43547).
- D. J. Farquharson (84217), RAFVR.
- H. R. R. Feilding (64882), RAFVR.
- G. E. Ferguson (83215), RAFVR.
- R. Fernie (46241).
- E. Fielden (107840), RAFVR.
- H. T. Flintoft (89455), RAFVR.
- C. C. Flynn (46247).
- C. J. Fooks, DFC (111679), RAFVR.
- A. J. Ford (77855), RAFVR.
- R. L. Ford (88771), RAFVR.
- G. M. Fossick (77582), RAFVR.
- A. D. Foster (64768), RAFVR.
- J. W. Foster (134757), RAFVR.
- L. J. W. P. Fountain (82395), RAFVR.
- E. Fowler (83938), RAFVR.
- E. E. Frankenburg (74802), RAFVR.
- A. L. Fussell (80930), RAFVR.
- T. Gallagher, MBE (46101).
- E. J. Galloway (101158), RAFVR.
- D. Garden (124010), RAFVR.
- J. E. Garlick (48294).
- W. T. Garratt (118291), RAF Regiment.
- W. I. German (63936), RAFVR.
- E. C. Geary (68237), RAFVR.
- A. F. H. Gee (78911), RAFVR.
- A. J. George (44987).
- C. A. Gibbs (57299), RAFVR.
- D. E. Gibbs, MBE (45383).
- M. Giddings (103753), RAFVR.
- J. Gilmour (129192), RAFVR.
- Y. Gilutz (87188), RAFVR.
- E. S. Gladwell (102187), RAF Regiment.
- L. J. Godding (105903), RAFVR.
- J. S. H. Goodall (139261), RAFVR.
- J. Goodman (45362).
- D. C. Goodrich (47331).
- R. C. Gorddard (46078).
- A. W. Gordon (118785), RAFVR.
- J. H. Gould (68240), RAFVR.
- C. R. V. Gray (69530), RAFVR.
- J. Grayston (118786), RAF Regiment.
- C. L. Green (115778), RAFVR.
- F. Griffin (45764).
- J. B. Griffith (50596).
- N. A. Gwyther (46656).
- W. F. Haines (48113), RAFVR.
- G. M. Hall (64778), RAFVR.
- R. W. Hamilton (142412), RAFVR.
- R. H. Hansen (42603), RAFVR.
- G. H. Hargreaves (89921), RAFVR.
- N. M. W. Harris (75133).
- J. A. E. Harrisson (85387), RAFVR.
- F. Hart, DFC (78008), RAFVR.
- W. C. Hart (140507).
- L. R. Hastings, DFC (124562), RAFVR.
- F. Haworth, DFC, DFM (46211).
- N. Haycocks (106913), RAFVR.
- P. J. Hearne (129957), RAFVR.
- D. I. E. Heath (131181), RAFVR.
- K. Herring (47089).
- H. G. Highton (117311), RAFVR.
- D. E. Hilliard (46746).
- E. F. Hine, OBE (100134), RAFVR.
- G. C. Hipkin, MBE (47529).
- J. E. A. Hoare, DSC (70309), RAFO.
- M. F. Hobden (118331), RAFVR.
- N. Vere-Hodge (115708), RAFVR.
- J. R. C. Honeybone (107599), RAFVR.
- R. M. Hood (60647), RAFVR.
- C. A. Hopkins (75902), RAFVR.
- R. A. Hoskins (77823), RAFVR.
- G. C. Howard (84944), RAFVR.
- W. F. Howe (44694).
- A. Hudson (48758).
- E. M. F. Hudson (87830), RAFVR.
- G. D. Hughes (103796), RAFVR.
- Sir H. W. Hulse (77159).
- B. V. Humphrey (48116).
- S. J. Hunt (60213), RAFVR.
- J. E. Hunter (80688), RAFVR.
- J. C. Hutchinson (60977), RAFVR.
- J. R. Illingworth (144892), RAFVR.
- C. F. Ingle (86547), RAFVR.
- L. Irwin (126922), RAFVR.
- E. Jackson (106838), RAFVR.
- G. H. N. Jacques (122042), RAFVR.
- A. M. Jamieson (86501), RAFVR.
- J. M. Jenkins (100219), RAFVR.
- H. V. Jessop (75665), RAFVR.
- D. S. Jewell (82341), RAFVR.
- W. A. Johnson (83487), RAFVR.
- E. H. Jones (82952), RAFVR.
- F. A. Jones (100768), RAFVR.
- J. Lloyd-Jones (110065), RAFVR.
- W. H. Jones, DFC (80625), RAFVR.
- W. H. R. Jones (89824), RAFVR.
- W. F. Jordan (76529), RAFVR.
- B. B. Joseph (62478), RAFVR.
- F. R. R. Kaye (75882), RAFVR.
- R. Kellie (104154), RAFVR.
- W. J. E. Kenaelly (44396).
- W. N. Kenyon (88395), RAFVR.
- D. V. Kidman (77749), RAFVR.
- S. L. Kilburn (90655), AAF.
- C. G. Kimbrey (47535).
- G. M. Kingsford (78933), RAFVR.
- (Sir) J. A. Kirkpatrick (85000), RAFVR.
- F. T. Kitchin (84113), RAFVR.
- H. S. L. Knight (131733), RAFVR.
- T. F. Kyle (44380).
- A. C. J. Lagden (103200), RAFVR.
- A. Lammer, DFC (81940), RAFVR.
- R. B. P. Land (43453).
- R. W. Languish (112332), RAFVR.
- W. G. Larman (81945), RAFVR.
- H. C. Lawrence (87778), RAFVR.
- F. A. Lawson (105251), RAFVR.
- H. W. Lees (111558), RAFVR.
- H. Levack (45748).
- C. V. Lewin (61375), RAFVR.
- R. E. R. Lloyd (78052), RAFVR.
- C. G. Lomax, DFC (120558), RAFVR.
- H. D. Longmate (83564), RAFVR.
- W. Lowry (70411), RAFVR.
- J. F. Lucas (61513), RAFVR.
- F. H. Ludford (62391), RAFVR.
- C. A. Lyall (107703), RAFVR.
- C. L. O. MacAlister (110809), RAFVR.
- H. T. Macauley (84258), RAFVR.
- J. H. McCoy (112459), RAFVR.
- J. McGrath (110069), RAFVR.
- I. M. MacGregor (62229), RAFVR.
- M. Macintyre (46140).
- G. L. A. McKenny, DFC (62002).
- C. H. McLeod (117152), RAFVR.
- G. H. Malcolm, DSO, DFC (64301), RAFVR.
- C. A. Male (82877), RAFVR.
- A. Marsden (88110), RAFVR.
- A. Martin (73890), RAFVR.
- N. W. Maskell (46354).
- P. D. May (79941), RAFVR.
- A. E. Mayhew (48838).
- D. J. Mears (68076), RAFVR.
- L. G. Meech (107631), RAFVR.
- B. Mendelssohn (84377), RAFVR.
- D. R. A. Michael (85942), RAFVR.
- R. B. Milburn, DFC (63070), RAFVR.
- G. D. Mills (44506).
- T. W. H. Mills (100144), RAFVR.
- W. M. Mills (67209), RAFVR.
- D. C. Moore (82863), RAFVR.
- G. H. D. More (60874), RAFVR.
- A. J. Morelli (112209), RAFVR.
- A. C. B. Morgan, DFC (102966).
- L. Morgan (44893).
- C. W. Morris (63912), RAFVR.
- P. L. O. Morris (85946), RAFVR.
- W. Morrison (121520), RAFVR.
- P. M. Moulding (85002).
- F. J. Mundy (107652), RAFVR.
- D. Munro (68893), RAFVR.
- F. L. E. Musgrove (75337), RAFVR.
- S. D. Musson, MBE (89934), RAFVR.
- P. T. Gifford-Nash (85469), RAFVR.
- W. J. Nave (79952), RAFVR.
- W. E. Newman (74539), RAFVR.
- H. A. Newton (60923), RAFVR.
- G. N. C. Nicholls (76971), RAFVR.
- R. F. Norman (101633), RAFVR.
- A. O'Connor (78510), RAFVR.
- A. F. O'Connor (87168), RAFVR.
- J. R. Oliver (46246).
- J. A. A. O'Shea (100187), RAFVR.
- A. S. Owen (76117), RAFVR.
- E. H. Page (81575), RAFVR.
- E. M. Pain, DFC (40640).
- J. F. Palmby (130044), RAFVR.
- E. B. Park (85196), RAFVR.
- J. T. Parsons (47186), RAFVR.
- A. M. Paterson, MBE (45922).
- T. Patten (69510), RAFVR.
- L. Pattinson (119949), RAFVR.
- C. Payne, DFC (149559), RAFVR.
- G. A. Pears (121434), RAFVR.
- G. A. Pearson (46106).
- A. P. W. Pepper, DFC (130267), RAFVR.
- B. F. Perkins (89830), RAFVR.
- C. J. Perkins (47780).
- F. N. H. Pexton (103205), RAFVR.
- A. S. Phillips (66631), RAFVR.
- H. H. Phillips (74200), RAFVR.
- A. H. G. Pickering (112643), RAFVR.
- R. B. C. Pilliner (84502), RAFVR.
- R. W. Pite (86173), RAFVR.
- C. H. Pocock (62782), RAFVR.
- J. V. Powell (84423), RAFVR.
- F. Preston (88293), RAFVR.
- N. K. Price (104127), RAFVR.
- W. G. Prothero (110488), RAFVR.
- D. E. Proudlove (111108), RAFVR.
- G. W. Pullan (105821), RAFVR.
- V. R. Pullan (21380), RAFO.
- N. G. Quenet, MBE (68274), RAFVR.
- A. A. Radford (45006).
- F. R. Range (44218).
- A. Reece, AFC, DSO, DFC (44128).
- L. F. Revell (103958), RAFVR.
- W. T. R. Richman (80756), RAFVR.
- G. A. Richmond (142319), RAFVR.
- K. R. Riddell (77563), RAFVR.
- F. C. Roberts (123037), RAFVR.
- H. O. Roberts (695553), RAFVR.
- G. T. Robin (103297), RAFVR.
- J. B. Robinson (87786), RAFVR.
- C. L. Rosenvinge (133589), RAFVR.
- E. W. D. Roy, DFC (47533).
- D. E. J. Saint (82713), RAFVR.
- W. H. Salmond (89023), RAFVR.
- H. L. Sammels (44948).
- F. M. R. F. Sander (88922), RAFVR.
- J. Sanderson (76121), RAFVR.
- J. B. Sayers (131547), RAFVR (deceased).
- H. Scott (121373), RAFVR.
- J. L. Scott (76498), RAFVR.
- J. R. Scott (132372), RAFVR.
- P. D. Scott (104442), RAFVR.
- H. Seymour (83454), RAFVR.
- G. D. Shand (87838), RAFVR.
- H. J. E. Shayler (111172), RAFVR.
- R. H. Shepherd (121934), RAFVR.
- N. B. Sherwell (83017), RAFVR.
- J. Liddell-Simpson (90570), AAF.
- G. B. Singlehurst, DSO, DFC (60342), RAFVR.
- J. C. Skelton (83393), RAFVR.
- L. E. Slaney (74803), RAFVR.
- B. B. Smith (87840), RAFVR.
- C. H. Smith (84233), RAFVR.
- D. G. Smith (109281), RAFVR.
- D. M. Smith (100779), RAFVR.
- J. A. Smith (48077).
- L. C. J. Smith (76927), RAFVR.
- M. Lawson-Smith (88042), RAFVR.
- P. Y. H. Smith (72942), RAFVR.
- S. G. W. Spaul (107188), RAFVR.
- C. H. Spencer (129994), RAFVR.
- G. E. Stamper (67750), RAFVR.
- D. B. Stampton (77435), RAFVR.
- W. C. J. Starling, BEM (44505).
- G. W. Stephen (69523)/RAFVR.
- A. Stephenson (87269), RAFVR.
- W. L. Stevenson (119317), RAFVR.
- A. Stewart, DFC (111947), RAFVR (deceased).
- T. A. Stewart, DFC (114955), RAFVR.
- H. J. A. Stockbridge (64803), RAFVR.
- J. H. Stoney (104830), RAFVR.
- D. Strachan (105961), RAFVR.
- D. E. Stuart (118371), RAFVR.
- F. W. Ballance-Stuart (85415), RAFVR.
- W. G. Sweeting (119069), RAFVR.
- A. J. S. Bell-Tawse (63385), RAFVR.
- M. A. T. Taylor (83660), RAFVR.
- M. O. Taylor (104109), RAFVR.
- D. S. Thaw (85334), RAFVR.
- R. C. A. Thompson (85154), RAFVR.
- H. A. Thomson (87142), RAFVR.
- R. G. Thurnhill (134297), RAFVR.
- J. W. Townsend (86260), RAFVR.
- G. F. Tredwell (64879), RAFVR.
- H. R. Tucker (44437).
- P. G. Tyler (31471), RAFO.
- F. H. L. Varcoe (73667), RAFVR.
- C. Vaughan (81814), RAFVR.
- W. P. T. Vear (83798), RAFVR.
- E. S. Venning (75068), RAFVR.
- R. G. Vevers (68314), RAFVR.
- J. Vivian, DSO, DFC (116153), RAFVR.
- B. A. Walkerdine (82035), RAFVR.
- F. A. Waller (87116), RAFVR.
- S. W. Waller (31489).
- E. G. Ward (119325), RAFVR.
- J. L. Ward (82032), RAFVR.
- W. C. Warner (127177), RAFVR.
- J. M. S. Watson (63115), RAFVR.
- T. D. Weatherhead (61545), RAFVR.
- A. G. Webb (43897).
- N. G. H. Weeks (44469).
- E. J. Wells (83404), RAFVR.
- A. C. G. Wenman (85270), RAFVR.
- P. A. Weston (101216), RAFVR.
- M. B. Whitbread, DFC (127309), RAFVR.
- A. Whitby, DFM (45721).
- H. F. Wicks (85202), RAFVR.
- J. Wicks (79071), RAFVR.
- N. Wilkinson (107406), RAFVR.
- E. Williams (133989), RAFVR.
- H. Williams (85530), RAFVR.
- R. S. F. Williams (44033), RAFVR.
- S. Williams (45871).
- E. S. Willox (85176), RAFVR.
- F. L. Wills (75036), RAFVR.
- F. E. Wilson (85796), RAFVR.
- H. Corbett-Wilson (43000).
- W. F. Wilson (105644), RAFVR.
- C. B. Wimbury (89163), RAFVR.
- R. G. W. Wing (67273), RAFVR.
- G. M. Winterbotham (110391), RAFVR.
- R. A. Wolverson (84443), RAFVR.
- E. A. Wood (89502), RAFVR.
- N. H. Wooding (60424), RAFVR.
- J. Woods (103121), RAFVR.
- A. C. Woolf (61181), RAFVR.
- B. G. T. Wormell (48075).
- J. H. Wortley, MM (60847), RAFVR.
- J. L. Wynne (108121), RAFVR.
- M. Wynroe (60991), RAFVR.
- S. J. R. Yelloly (120709), RAFVR.
- P. Yeoman (84203), RAFVR.
- J. H. D. Young (81733), RAFVR.
- J. R. S. Young, DFC (60626), RAFVR.

Flight Lieutenants

- H. Abbott (106763), RAFVR.
- D. Agnew (120016), RAFVR.
- A. J. C. Akehurst (130881), RAFVR.
- J. S. Aldridge (84669), RAFVR.
- J. W. E. Alexander (42178).
- N. E. Allen (105719), RAFVR.
- B. T. Anderson (77743), RAFVR.
- G. B. Anderson, MC (79074), RAFVR.
- R. H. Anderson (142559), RAFVR.
- R. T. Andrews (140609), RAFVR.
- B. Ashdown (51424).
- S. J. A. Asher (128694), RAFVR.
- C. G. Atherton (87172), RAFVR.
- F. M. Atkinson (105283), RAFVR.
- R. E. Atkinson (41242).
- P. F. Bailey (137316), RAFVR.
- P. E. Bairstow, DFC (120452), RAFVR.
- A. S. Baker (89788), RAFVR.
- P. M. Banks (135075), RAFVR.
- S. H. J. Barnden (124636), RAFVR.
- S. A. Barry (150152), RAFVR.
- L. J. Bartley (105991), RAFVR.
- L. L. Bartley (42181), RAFO.
- C. F. G. Bass (67137), RAFVR.
- R. O. P. Beatty, DFC (117570), RAFVR.
- K. A. Benson (107036), RAFVR.
- A. J. Berkin (86062), RAFVR.
- A. Beynon (140003), RAFVR.
- V. J. Billing (103261), RAFVR.
- J. Bines (128545), RAFVR.
- R. W. Birchall, AFM (143917), RAFVR.
- T. H. Blake (48734).
- E. G. Bligh (86781), RAFVR.
- G. Bliss (70070), RAFO.
- L. G. Blomfield (78295), RAFVR.
- J. M. W. Boyd (107144), RAFVR.
- D. J. Boyer (124919), RAFVR.
- A. E. Bradley (127117), RAFVR.
- J. C. C. Braint (84602), RAFVR.
- R. Broadbent, DFC (109356), RAFVR.
- W. E. Broadfield (116200), RAFVR.
- J. P. Brockbank (110865), RAFVR.
- A. M. Brown (135603), RAFVR.
- F. Brown (64367), RAFVR.
- W. A. Brown (68826), RAFVR.
- H. F. Browne (73109), RAFVR.
- W. H. Brunskill, DFC (122827), RAFVR.
- R. S. Buckle (61838), RAFVR.
- J. Budd (121633), RAFVR.
- H. Burge (47568).
- G. C. Burton (64239), RAFVR.
- P. P. Burton (47372).
- F. Butler (131971), RAFVR.
- W. Butler (130458), RAFVR.
- D. H. Button, DFM (50953).
- R. W. Bywater (130234), RAFVR.
- H. F. J. Callan (118991), RAFVR.
- H. Cameron (117327), RAFVR.
- J. Campbell (132209), RAFVR.
- R. H. Campbell (107856), RAFVR.
- R. G. Carpenter (144351), RAFVR.
- E. D. Carwithen (89847), RAFVR.
- D. A. Casley (49365).
- I. H. Cassie (69994), RAFVR.
- D. Castle (129512), RAFVR.
- G. D. Castle (43351).
- E. W. Catley (117446), RAFVR.
- L. C. Cesek (78048), RAFVR.
- W. H. Cheek, DFC (51799).
- P. S. Cheshire (121040), RAFVR.
- D. C. Clark (116516), RAFVR.
- L. G. Clark, DFC (131639), RAFVR.
- E. F. Clennell (80574), RAFVR.
- J. Cobb, DFC (51114).
- W. V. J. Cole (130297), RAFVR.
- R. T. H. Collis (111107), RAFVR.
- A. G. H. Cooper (81665), RAFVR.
- E. F. Cooper (62797), RAFVR.
- T. E. Cooper (142937), RAFVR.
- C. W. Coulthard (104469), RAFVR.
- J. D. Cousins (121279), RAFVR.
- A. L. Cowdry (105702), RAFVR.
- J. C. Cox (112516), RAFVR.
- H. Criswell, DFC (117990), RAFVR.
- J. M. Crook (80354), RAFVR.
- T. A. D. Crook (102306), RAFVR.
- T. H. Cullen, MBE (81303), RAFVR.
- W. J. P. Cunningham (45281).
- A. H. Cutting, MB, BS (115951), RAFVR.
- A. Dale (103316), RAFVR.
- M. L. Daniels (122314), RAFVR.
- E. Dann (69961), RAFVR.
- J. W. Darling (143886), RAFVR.
- W. Davidson (68067), RAFVR.
- R. H. R. Davies (78574), RAFVR.
- F. J. Day (47743).
- G. C. T. Deas (150032), RAFVR.
- D. Dewar (70175), RAFO.
- R. A. Dewhurst (126093), RAFVR.
- G. H. Dhenin, GM (138384), RAFVR.
- E. A. Dick (155096), RAFVR.
- F. R. P. Digman (62193), RAFVR.
- A. W. Dodds (106246), RAFVR.
- C. B. Dodridge (47923).
- W. B. Doig (137447), RAFVR.
- J. D. Dolwin (102633), RAFVR.
- J. A. Donson (68764), RAFVR.
- W. F. Dorr (110447), RAFVR.
- T. M. Douglas (133756), RAFVR.
- M. L. Dowling (114255), RAFVR.
- K. D. Drysdale (49428).
- N. H. Duckworth (46998).
- A. L. Duncan (79533), RAFVR.
- L. J. P. Dunlop (119722), RAFVR.
- F. A. Dungey, DFC (128406), RAFVR.
- F. E. Dymond (48316), RAFVR.
- K. G. Eckersley (61853).
- P. Edelsten (128855), RAFVR.
- I. F. Edgar (85642).
- R. T. Edwards (127248), RAFVR.
- A. C. Elliott (139138), RAFVR.
- S. H. J. Elliott (115214), RAFVR.
- D. F. R. Emus, AFC (124614), RAFVR.
- J. Etchells, DFC (113395), RAFVR.
- J. A. Evans (82334), RAFVR.
- S. I. Ewart (47203).
- R. K. Fairbrother (89755), RAFVR.
- A. H. Fairlamb (69978), RAFVR.
- F. W. Fennell, DFC (117924), RAFVR.
- G. F. Fern, DFM (123815), RAFVR.
- K. G. Fisher (142004), RAFVR.
- W. D. Fisher (85111), RAFVR.
- J. H. Flitcroft (88840), RAFVR.
- W. S. Forbes (104638), RAFVR.
- F. W. Ford (144496), RAFVR.
- J. C. Ford (43677).
- R. C. Fordham (47439).
- A. F. Forsdike, DFC (61953), RAFVR.
- A. D. Forster, MBE (77052), RAFVR.
- H. Fowler (119184), RAFVR.
- R. J. Fowler (111221), RAFVR.
- C. W. L. Fox (116604), RAFVR.
- H. R. L. Fraser (66474), RAFVR.
- R. A. Frost, DFC (141973), RAFVR.
- K. N. Fry (137219), RAFVR.
- W. D. Gaffney (47386).
- J. F. Galbraith (135842), RAFVR.
- E. T. D. Garlick (61103), RAFVR.
- J. E. Garrish (83626), RAFVR.
- G. R. H. Geoghegan (86076), RAFVR.
- P. E. L. Gethin, OBE, DFC (69522), RAFVR.
- H. P. Gibbons (131023), RAFVR (deceased).
- T. A. Gibbs (130066), RAFVR.
- R. W. Gloyne (140140), RAFVR.
- J. T. Goddard (106631), RAFVR.
- M. L. Godden (141533), RAFVR.
- A. G. Golby (60204), RAFVR.
- B. R. Goodsir (71443), RAFO.
- G. R. Goodwin, DFM (158703), RAFVR.
- F. Corner (132214), RAFVR.
- T. E. C. Graty (62712), RAFVR.
- G. Gray (128543), RAFVR.
- K. G. Gray (120015), RAFVR.
- A. F. Green (136037), RAFVR.
- F. R. Green (86639), RAFVR.
- G. C. D. Green (103594), RAFVR.
- R. P. Greenwood (86084), RAFVR.
- P. R. Hairs (76316), RAFVR.
- J. D. Hale (41176), RAFO.
- R. N. Hamer (131486), RAFVR.
- R. W. Hanner (82046), RAFVR.
- W. Harbison (133668), RAFVR.
- R. P. Harding (113876), RAFVR.
- N. S. Harrild (109122), RAFVR.
- J. T. Hart (137247).
- E. L. Hartley (136223).
- W. P. Hasseldine (115751), RAFVR.
- D. R. Hatton (129070), RAFVR (deceased).
- J. D. Haworth (80451), RAFVR.
- C. W. Hayes (123491), RAFVR.
- J. R. Hayward (64817), RAFVR.
- G. A. Herlihy (45883).
- W. Heath (65974), RAFVR.
- E. A. J. Hillman (100042), RAFVR.
- E. Hilton (129163), RAFVR.
- J. Hinchcliffe (60702), RAFVR.
- J. F. Hipwood (65635), RAFVR.
- B. H. Holloway (100695), RAFVR.
- W. F. Holmes (46818).
- W. P. Honeyman (136428), RAFVR.
- H. S. Hopcraft (63196), RAFVR.
- F. E. G. Hopkins (116011), RAFVR.
- M. S. P. Houdret (89052), RAFVR.
- N. E. Houghton (89683), RAFVR.
- V. Howard (46063).
- E. Howey (124810), RAFVR.
- M. J. Howlett (117374), RAFVR.
- A. M. Hughes (133677), RAFVR.
- D. S. Hunt (118235), RAFVR.
- G. H. Huntley (12(3597).
- J. A. Hutchinson (117886), RAFVR.
- G. W. Ions (46376).
- P. E. Ipsen (117791), RAFVR.
- M. Jackson (124848), RAFVR.
- T. H. Jackson (19631), RAFVR.
- V. H. Jaynes (122502), RAFVR.
- J. R. Jeffrey (132707), RAFVR.
- T. John (47134).
- H. D. Johnson (119186), RAFVR.
- J. W. Jones (105999), RAFVR.
- P. R. Jones (113199), RAFVR.
- H. L. Karby (111746), RAFVR.
- J. B. Karran (67560), RAFVR.
- H. D. Kelvin (66571), RAFVR.
- R. Kennedy (138845), RAFVR.
- H. R. Kerr (136728), RAFVR.
- E. G. King (49493).
- E. J. Kinshott (140768), RAFVR.
- L. F. Lampitt (110061), RAFVR.
- A. F. Lang (129762), RAFVR.
- E. Y. Lapham (60157), RAFVR.
- N. Lawrence (61621), RAFVR.
- G. A. Lean (109929), RAFVR.
- C. W. Lawson (69928), RAFVR.
- P. J. R. Lee (118475), RAFVR.
- T. M. Lee (115286), RAFVR.
- R. W. Leggett (122820), RAFVR.
- P. Lewis (176271), RAFVR.
- M. Lissner, DFC (86413), RAFVR.
- F. C. L. Littlejohns (73975), RAFVR.
- R. G. Long (103852), RAFVR.
- A. H. Love (121316), RAFVR.
- E. V. Lyell (86576), RAFVR.
- D. C. Lynch (77847), RAFVR.
- W. E. McChesney (46291).
- R. C. McDougall (61170), RAFVR.
- A. H. McGrady (48780).
- D. McIntosh (144397), RAFVR.
- K. A. Mackenzie (138918), RAFVR.
- R. C. W. McMullan, DFC, DFM (132985), RAFVR.
- I. M. Macnicol (116738), RAFVR.
- G. A. McPartlin (61378), RAFVR.
- H. A. Haddocks (101690), RAFVR.
- G. H. Mair (147222), RAFVR.
- J. E. Marsh (146852), RAFVR.
- R. W. Marshall (46014).
- W. C. Marshall (126834), RAFVR.
- E. J. Matthews (87806), RAFVR.
- S. F. Maunder (128021), RAFVR (deceased).
- A. J. May (120179), RAFVR.
- R. J. O. Maybury (49552).
- T. L. Mayfield (135474), RAFVR.
- M. F. Meredith (140011), RAFVR.
- A. M. Michie (122225), RAFVR.
- P. O. Miles, DFC (112012), RAFVR.
- S. I. Millar (139881), RAFVR.
- E. G. Miller (101696), RAFVR.
- G. C. Millichamp (81582), RAFVR.
- E. P. T. Milway (47967).
- W. J. Mitchell (77380), RAFVR.
- E. W. Mogg (76288), RAFVR.
- H. R. Moore (82418), RAFVR.
- R. E. Morgan 176539), RAFVR.
- W. V. Morgan (136570), RAFVR.
- M. A. Mortimer, DFC (124329), RAFVR.
- R. N. Moss (106285), RAFVR.
- A. W. Motion (88785), RAFVR.
- N. E. Muckle (130838), RAFVR.
- D. W. Muglestone (158350), RAFVR.
- H. Mulholland (134609), RAFVR.
- B. R. Murphy (119286), RAFVR.
- L. H. J. Nash (134022), RAFVR.
- J. A. Neville (126843), RAFVR.
- I. O. Newton (141754), RAFVR.
- D. B. Nixon (141725), RAFVR.
- J. Nixon (122088), RAFVR.
- W. S. Noble (117978), RAFVR.
- D. J. G. Norton (134037), RAFVR.
- F. T. O'Connell (46104).
- J. D. O'Gorman (102291), RAFVR.
- A. J. Oury (138848), RAFVR.
- D. G. O. Owen (80333), RAFVR.
- J. C. Page (76924), RAFVR.
- D. A. Parrott (83929), RAFVR.
- H. Parrott (138428), RAFVR.
- E. W. Partridge (89300), RAFVR.
- G. E. Payne (68305), RAFVR.
- J. Pearson (141505), RAFVR.
- H. W. Peel (52175).
- J. O. Pennington, DFC (144275), RAFVR.
- R. P. Pepperdine, DFC (145773), RAFVR.
- J. E. Perkins (124852), RAFVR.
- F. L. Petch (46585).
- D. H. Phillips (82839), RAFVR.
- N. F. Phillips (148011), RAFVR.
- T. G. Pickering (114471), RAFVR.
- B. S. J. Piff (46814).
- L. A. Pink (120582), RAFVR.
- W. R. Plummer (119472), RAFVR.
- H. J. Pointer (138897), RAFVR.
- R. Poole (119812), RAFVR.
- R. E. Pope (81360), RAFVR.
- G. A. Potter (117029), RAFVR.
- D. J. Powell (141365), RAFVR.
- A. C. Pressman (47077).
- P. C. Hayter-Preston (117491), RAFVR.
- M. B. Price (117564), RAFVR.
- A. J. Rabbets (145693), RAFVR.
- F. H. Radford (53644).
- H. D. Rankin (83710), RAFVR.
- A. Rawling (49172).
- A. B. H. Reed (86439), RAF Regiment.
- C. H. F. Reynolds (61113), RAFVR.
- K. Richards (63040), RAFVR.
- J. R. T. Richardson (61382), RAFVR.
- K. J. Riddy, DFC (63077), RAFVR.
- L. C. Robbins (44615).
- F. Roberts (142745), RAFVR.
- R. M. Emrys-Roberts (138029), RAFVR.
- G. E. Robertson (43111), RAFVR.
- L. N. Robertson (79697), RAFVR.
- J, Rogers (102161), RAFVR.
- K. D. U. Rogers (83897), RAFVR.
- A. A. Roissetter (46279).
- R. K. C. Rose (85580), RAFVR.
- S. E. Ross (108752), RAFVR.
- B. E. T. Rostron (138906), RAFVR.
- K. Ruskell, DFC (131595), RAFVR.
- J. E. Russell (116495), RAFVR.
- F. R. R. Sale (66101), RAFVR.
- J. G. Sandison (41804), RAFO.
- R. A. Sandison (121445), RAFVR.
- R. E. B. Sargent, AFC (122024), RAFVR.
- A. L. O. Scadding (139824), RAFVR.
- E. A. Scorer (140477), RAFVR.
- W. E. Scott (101828), RAFVR.
- E. Sealey (48020).
- S. Semple (140208), RAFVR.
- G. W. Sharp (104407), RAFVR.
- C. Shaw (47515).
- H. J. Simms (51362).
- S. W. Simms (137086).
- W. F. Simpson (89944), RAFVR.
- P. J. Sindell (46322).
- A. E. Sloman (123018), RAFVR.
- B. M. Smith (121943), RAFVR.
- H. Smith (61401), RAFVR.
- J. Smith (134020), RAFVR.
- J. G. Smith (120608), RAFVR.
- R. Smith (140045), RAFVR.
- T. Smith (140004), RAFVR.
- B. N. Sonley (106951), RAFVR.
- G. M. Southcombe (111840), RAFVR.
- H. G. Sparks, MBE (46189).
- G. F. Sparrow (132338), RAFVR.
- D. J. Speares (121395), RAFVR.
- T. D. Spencer (48535).
- J. R. Spiers (143703), RAFVR.
- N. F. Spurr (102178), RAFVR.
- A. A. Standen (46118).
- C. F. Starr (144382), RAFVR.
- G. Stephenson (72949), RAFVR.
- B. C. G. Stevens (115528), RAFVR.
- H. M. Stevenson (79449), RAFVR.
- A. R. Stewart (117130), RAFVR.
- J. Stockden (133758), RAFVR.
- D. Stothard (47480).
- G. R. Styles (63041), RAFVR.
- W. R. Tait (55104), RAFVR.
- J. G. Talbot (85723), RAFVR.
- J. M. Talbot (110942), RAFVR.
- M. Tarbet (127687), RAFVR.
- W. Taylor (102126), RAFVR.
- W. S. Thimblethorpe (75698), RAFVR.
- D. R. Thomas (140466), RAFVR.
- K. I. Thomas (51216).
- J. R. Thomlinson (82229), RAFVR.
- A. W. Thompson (109488), RAFVR (deceased).
- R. Thompson, DFC (115327).
- E. Thomson (113423), RAFVR.
- F. W. Tipple (64277), RAFVR.
- F. E. G. Tookey (123695), RAFVR.
- R. A. Toy (151478), RAFVR.
- R. J. Tremayne (84433), RAFVR.
- J. W. F. Trievnor (137651), RAFVR.
- R. Tuck (13027), RAFO.
- L. G. L. Turner (112101), RAFVR.
- G. J. Vaughan (140931), RAFVR.
- E. N. Ventham (46105).
- C. H. Vickerman (109454), RAFVR.
- J. Walker (124619), RAFVR.
- C. M. G. Wallwork (87899), RAFVR.
- G. C. H. Walsh (123509), RAFVR.
- E. F. Walter (77475), RAFVR.
- A. B. Walton (86182), RAFVR.
- N. Ward (114420), RAFVR.
- W. R. Ward (84640), RAFVR.
- T. C. Warnock (127325), RAFVR.
- J. C. Warren, MC, DCM (82245), RAFVR.
- S. A. Warren (48751).
- J. C. R. Waterhouse (112749), RAFVR.
- W. K. Watkins (89886), RAFVR.
- R. Watson (61455), RAFVR.
- J. Weber (115547), RAFVR.
- A. T. Webster (123619), RAFVR.
- R. O. Webster (127955) (deceased).
- E. W. Weekley (63168), RAFVR.
- H. W. Wickham, DFC (124631), RAFVR.
- W. J. Wilkinson, DFM (143091), RAFVR.
- K. Williams, DFC (121256), RAFVR.
- R. A. Williamson (131001), RAFVR.
- D. B. Wills (115997). RAFVR.
- J. Wilson (68121), RAFVR.
- C. B. B. Wood (113812), RAFVR.
- R. J. Woodroffe (87903), RAFVR.
- F. J. Wools (129391), RAFVR.
- D. Wright (131913), RAFVR.
- F. W. Wright (83761), RAFVR.
- W. G. Wright, DFC (138402), RAFVR.
- G. C. P. Wyeth (132199).
- N. B. Young (130802), RAFVR.

Honorary Flight Lieutenants

- L. P. Cox (71196), RAFO.
- R. T. Dart (71195), RAFO.

Acting Flight Lieutenants

- W. T. Abbott (51229).
- L. F. Abraham (63227), RAFVR.
- R. Acton (147822), RAFVR.
- R. Agnew (50157).
- J. C. Allan (101138), RAFVR.
- H. R. Allen (122459), RAFVR.
- L. J. G. Allen (130090), RAFVR.
- N. V. Almy (116561), RAFVR.
- F. C. Apps (51151).
- A. W. Arkinstall (52721).
- J. M. Arnott (120198), RAFVR.
- E. W. Ashton (105659), RAFVR.
- S. F. Ashwood (138946), RAFVR.
- R. G. Atkins (126562), RAFVR.
- E. H. Banks (115088), RAFVR.
- J. C. Barker (47592).
- W. L. Barnes (101140), RAFVR.
- N. Barratt (100214), RAFVR.
- J. L. Bayston (108371), RAFVR.
- H. G. Beales (48234).
- A. F. Bell (86928), RAFVR.
- G. Betteley (133280), RAFVR.
- S. F. Bidmead (111794), RAFVR.
- G. L. Birch (107549), RAFVR.
- D. F. Bland (109412), RAFVR.
- W. C. Bland (146168), RAFVR.
- R. C. Blackham (136478), RAFVR.
- G. R. Boak (68289), RAFVR.
- W. Booth (104251), RAFVR.
- J. A. Bott, DFM (144655), RAFVR.
- G. J. Bowie (157460), RAFVR.
- C. P. Bradshaw (169720), RAFVR.
- W. H. C. Brain (49762).
- S. G. J. Briault (136972), RAFVR.
- R. F. Brookes (106306), RAFVR.
- J. H. Brooks (53735).
- S. A. Brooks (110108), RAFVR.
- E. Brown (139145), RAFVR.
- E. Brown (113210), RAFVR.
- R. Brownlee (17639), RAFVR.
- F. C. Brunsdon (113067), RAFVR.
- W. Buckley (146169), RAFVR.
- J. A. Buddle (141227), RAFVR.
- A. H. Heath-Bullock (123903), RAFVR.
- C. Burgin (109606), RAFVR.
- S. J. Burroughs (113818), RAFVR.
- J. Burton (123257), RAFVR.
- H. J. Cail (130475), RAFVR.
- C. J. Caldicott (49852).
- C. E. Cagienard (110981), RAFVR.
- C. M. Callan (155153), RAFVR.
- D. L. Campbell (172192), RAFVR.
- F. H. A. Campbell (102193), RAFVR.
- I. M. Campbell (135159), RAFVR.
- A. G. Carter (122538), RAFVR.
- C. L. Catford (136093), RAFVR.
- H. D. Caunce (104747), RAFVR.
- F. W. Chandler (113533), RAFVR.
- H. Chapman (129497), RAFVR.
- W. R. C. Chapman (115119), RAFVR.
- W. D. Charles (105741), RAFVR.
- C. C. Churchouse (139145), RAFVR.
- C. P. Clark (106151), RAFVR.
- J. N. Clarke (51188).
- P. H. Clifton (157577), RAFVR.
- A. T. Clough (60636), RAFVR.
- H. P. Clough (144143), RAFVR.
- H. J. Clout (159258), RAFVR.
- E. Colchester (67145), RAFVR.
- H. L. C. Cole (136636), RAFVR.
- R. L. Colley (100114), RAFVR.
- L. Cook (45220).
- C. G. Cornwell (157470), RAFVR.
- E. L. Cornwell (136611), RAFVR.
- E. J. Croall (125357), RAFVR.
- J. W. Crossby (105341), RAFVR.
- W. L. Davies (157246), RAFVR.
- H. A. Davis (123282), RAFVR.
- G. H. Deeley (121491), RAFVR.
- A. Delittle (105413), RAFVR.
- J. Dodds, DFC (157404), RAFVR.
- V. E. Dolman (131810), RAFVR.
- R. T. Dowley (107389), RAFVR.
- R. H. Dilley (156203), RAFVR.
- C. Dimmick (145565), RAFVR.
- G. D. S. Dixon (69576), RAFVR.
- I. H. J. Doble (49712).
- J. G. Dunning (115706), RAFVR.
- A. J. Dunsfold (114256), RAFVR.
- C. H, A. Easey (49124).
- S. A. Eastmead (48254).
- S. J. Easton (48945).
- A. B. Ebrey (113970), RAFVR.
- A. F. Evans (113975), RAFVR.
- R. G. Evans (131690), RAFVR.
- W. D. Evans (117527), RAFVR.
- L. H. Fairbrother (110456), RAFVR.
- H. A. Farley (50300).
- S. E. Feast (113449), RAFVR.
- J. T. Fielding (109459), RAFVR.
- R. H. Finch (82080), RAFVR.
- R. Fleming (136745), RAFVR.
- F. H. Flude (112891), RAFVR.
- G. T. Foden (46236).
- H. A. R. Fortin (117212), RAFVR.
- R. S. K. Fortune (49905).
- D. Foster, DFM (156323), RAFVR.
- K. W. B. Fouweather (142260), RAFVR.
- D. K. Fraser (74258), RAFVR.
- A. S. Frater (105344), RAFVR.
- S. E. H. Freeman (48460).
- D. L. Hussey-Freke (100701), RAFVR.
- R. F. H. G. Galere (159188), RAFVR.
- D. Gallaghan (117708), RAFVR.
- C. H. B. Gardner (117885), RAFVR.
- J. E. Garrick (138252), RAFVR.
- R. C. Gates (49855).
- C. G. Gibson (111811), RAFVR.
- A. L. Gilchrist (159788), RAFVR.
- N. W. Gillett (111734), RAFVR.
- B. T. Good (117382), RAFVR.
- E. M. Goodger (110222), RAFVR.
- H. J. Gorman (110512), RAFVR.
- G. E. F. Gottelier (140800), RAFVR.
- V. F. C. Gowland (178651), RAFVR.
- J. J. Grant (139043). RAFVR.
- D. J. Green (156108), RAFVR.
- E. J. Gregory (51453).
- H. D. F. Guyton (158499), RAFVR.
- A. R. Hall (144865), RAFVR.
- F. H. Hall (114279), RAFVR.
- C. E. G. Hamlin (46747).
- V. S. Hansford (135029), RAFVR.
- C. Harding (118795), RAFVR.
- L. Harding (110994), RAFVR.
- R. Harper (107211), RAFVR.
- D. O. P. M. Harrison (118266), RAFVR.
- L. S. Harrison (139116).
- V. W. C. Harvey (121681), RAFVR.
- P. H. F. Hawkins, DFM (143729), RAFVR.
- J. H. Heath (101163), RAFVR.
- L. Heseltine (115253), RAFVR.
- J. C. Higginson (105465), RAFVR.
- L. F. Hilborne (118801), RAFVR.
- W. N. Hill (100120), RAFVR.
- R. M. Hilton (141198), RAFVR.
- R. A. Hirons (102788), RAFVR.
- H. J. Hoare (113185), RAFVR.
- J. B. Hoare (141179), RAFVR.
- S. I. Hollingworth (134457), RAFVR.
- J. W. Holmes (53282), RAFVR.
- M. M. Holmes (103191), RAFVR.
- P. Holmes (113940), RAFVR.
- L. G. Hope (121778), RAFVR.
- W. J. S. Hopkins (131752), RAFVR.
- H. H. Houghton (118783), RAFVR.
- J. H. Howell (117348).
- W. G. Howes (112875).
- H. H. Howson (189071), RAFVR.
- J. Hudson (133242), RAFVR.
- J. C. N. Hughes (147039), RAFVR.
- F. Hull (50419).
- H. J. Hulse (48847).
- J. M. Hunter (118513), RAFVR.
- E. W. Ingram (109227), RAFVR.
- W. G. Grant-Irwin (117607), RAFVR.
- T. R. Isherwood (144924), RAFVR.
- J. Jackson (140920), RAFVR.
- G. H. Jacobsen, AFM (51074), RAFVR.
- B. James (100185), RAFVR.
- B. A. James (104921), RAFVR.
- I. T. James (114351), RAFVR.
- A. E. Jeffrey (160998), RAFVR.
- R. A. Jennings (111825), RAFVR.
- P. H. Johns (48203).
- G. Johnston (138267), RAFVR.
- H. H. Jones (153094), RAFVR.
- P. T. Jones (132561), RAFVR.
- R. A. Jones (147399), RAFVR.
- R. C. R. Jones (112168), RAFVR.
- W. E. Jones (50871).
- H. Karten (117623), RAFVR.
- D. A. Kellond (103822), RAFVR.
- G. C. Kelly (136974), RAFVR.
- C. W. Kemp (46575).
- D. K. Kempston (49458).
- C. Kennair (107500), RAFVR.
- H. G. Kimpton (51338).
- N. T. S. King (114360), RAFVR.
- C. Kinnaird (50566).
- N. Kirby (138009), RAFVR.
- A. Kratt (112773).
- E. T. Lace ( 7536), RAFVR.
- J. V. Lach (141631), RAFVR.
- W. E. Ladd (82250), RAFVR.
- R. C. Lambert (50875).
- P. H. E. Lauder (138377), RAFVR.
- A. R. Lawes (52295).
- S. R. Leeder (51640).
- L. Legg (68546), RAFVR.
- J. Leslie (49498).
- J. Lewis (145852), RAFVR.
- L. G. Lewsey (157282), RAFVR.
- S. J. Lidstone (51246).
- E. G. Lines (53660).
- C. A. Little (148303), RAFVR.
- A. E. Lomas (144467), RAFVR.
- E. Longden (122718), RAFVR.
- W. H. Lovesy (146993), RAFVR.
- H. Lowery (142956), RAFVR.
- T. J. Lugg (138587), RAFVR.
- J. S. Macara (106587), RAFVR.
- P. McDermott (52445).
- F. P. T. MacDonald (117249), RAFVR.
- D. J. Mackenzie (112194), RAFVR.
- A. J. Maclay (103233), RAFVR.
- M. B. McLeod (111568), RAFVR.
- D. P. MacPherson (112196), RAFVR.
- D. Macwhirter (50839).
- T. J. McWiggan (169788), RAFVR.
- S. T. Mander (168546), RAFVR.
- W. J. A. Mann (130487), RAFVR.
- W. G. Martin (46556).
- H. A. Mason (68283), RAFVR.
- H. W. Meadows (129309), RAFVR.
- W. Meekin (123208), RAFVR.
- D. McG. Menzies (131670), RAFVR.
- L. R. Miers (147477), RAFVR.
- R. Millership (124288), RAFVR.
- A. H. Mitchell (130347), RAFVR.
- N. Mitchell (103893), RAFVR.
- A. H. W. Mold (130961), RAFVR.
- R. L. Moody (157268), RAFVR.
- L. E. Moran, DFC (52937), RAFVR.
- A. P. Morris (142430), RAFVR.
- L. C. Moynihan (123814), RAF Regiment.
- C. L. Mull (105713), RAFVR.
- F. Murphy (119161), RAFVR.
- J. T. Murphy (50360).
- R. M. Murray (140479), RAFVR.
- A. Nesbit (54020), RAFVR.
- T. W. Newman (114459), RAFVR.
- E. J. Newnham (159113), RAFVR.
- G. J. H. Nichol (111008), RAFVR.
- W. L. Nix (113808), RAFVR.
- C. Northover (114390), RAFVR.
- D. J. G. Norton (134037), RAFVR.
- G. J. Nutkins (106901), RAFVR.
- W. E. Nuttall (103909), RAFVR.
- I. B. Ogilvie (49390), RAFVR.
- F. Ogley (155713), RAFVR.
- H. F. Orchard (145207), RAFVR.
- C. F. Osborn (142286), RAFVR.
- F. Pakes (51622).
- G. Parish (52992).
- A. E. Parmenter (162618), RAFVR.
- C. J. Parris (113028), RAFVR.
- D. G. Parry (106118), RAFVR.
- N. Pascall (123184), RAFVR.
- F. E. Pearson (114394), RAFVR.
- F. Pembry (48877).
- M. H. Perry (53688).
- P. R. Pfaff (132552), RAFVR.
- F. Pickering (134281), RAFVR.
- L. Pickup (114018), RAFVR.
- J. T. Pike (50393).
- W. J. Pope (49517).
- R. E. Porteous (52516).
- J. A. Powell (138223), RAFVR.
- J. W. Powell (120844), RAFVR.
- P. Procter (109728), RAFVR.
- H. E. Pullen (51997).
- M. G. Radcliffe (67172), RAFVR.
- L. Rae (120143), RAFVR.
- K. R. Reed (119366), RAFVR.
- A. H. Revill (128040), RAFVR.
- R. D. Richardson (49393).
- E. R. M. Roberts (112234), RAFVR.
- J. E. Roberts (53009), RAFVR.
- J. F. Roberts (67217), RAFVR.
- T. Robertson (103965), RAFVR.
- R. T. Robinson (106106), RAFVR.
- H. R. Rocky (139236), RAFVR.
- G. W. A. Roe (54149).
- H. Rogers (116491), RAFVR.
- E. J. A. Rolfe (123177), RAFVR.
- M. C. Rose (68771), RAFVR
- R. S. Ross (104821), RAFVR.
- H. G. Rowe (48344), RAFVR.
- P. A. Rowland (141190), RAFVR.
- F. W. Sadler (103974), RAFVR.
- F. W. Sander (107634), RAFVR.
- J. C. Sargent (136998), RAFVR.
- E. R. J. Scarrett (126573), RAFVR.
- B. Scott (47980).
- G. Scott (50425).
- F. W. H. Seamark (52409).
- R. L. McL. Sim (107710), RAFVR.
- R. Simpson (110272), RAFVR.
- C. A. M. Sims (102750), RAFVR.
- T. Smart (155578), RAFVR.
- B. C. G. Smith (158212), RAFVR.
- C. T. Smith (110016), RAF Regiment.
- E. Smith (48023).
- E. A. Smith (142311), RAFVR.
- J. Smith (123677), RAFVR.
- J. E. Smith (51487).
- J. M. Smith (137070), RAFVR.
- R. G. Spanton (138273), RAFVR.
- R. O. Soper (54414).
- B. J. H. Spearing (105359), RAFVR.
- D. L. Speeks (134172), RAFVR.
- J. D. Stafford (51365).
- B. F. Stannard (51630).
- G. A. Stevens (51100).
- G. T. Stevens (51984).
- F. H. Stokes (139314), RAFVR.
- J. F. Stott (113606), RAFVR.
- C. A. Strange (170062), RAFVR.
- G. R. W. Sully (131589), RAFVR.
- A. B. Sutcliffe (144490)
- D. E. Sweeny (141062), RAFVR.
- K. E. Swinfen (104023), RAFVR.
- E. F. Taylor (109152), RAFVR.
- E. W. Thomas (46954).
- J. W. Thomson (145350), RAFVR.
- E. J. G. Thring (121492), RAFVR.
- F. C. Tighe (139265), RAFVR.
- J. Timewell (107701), RAFVR.
- S. Tomlinson (109584), RAFVR.
- W. M. Townsend (111842), RAFVR.
- O. C. Trimby (114638), RAFVR.
- S. L. Trowbridge (149895), RAFVR.
- J. Turner (105616), RAFVR.
- S. Tyas (130051), RAFVR.
- F. A. Van Meeteren (112823), RAFVR.
- D. W. Vinall (143816), RAFVR.
- J. F. Viveash (47977).
- J. E. R. Vosper (112126), RAFVR.
- J. H. Walker (129273), RAFVR.
- L. V. Walsh (52309) (deceased)
- D. Walshe (158432), RAFVR.
- J. L. Walter (64391), RAFVR.
- F. T. Ward (104063), RAFVR.
- F. W. E. Ward (135957), RAFVR.
- H. G. M. Ward (118975), RAFVR.
- L. G. Watkins (136069), RAFVR.
- N. L. Weatherall (113787), RAFVR.
- E. G. Webb (105987), RAFVR.
- J. R. Webber (49467).
- G. W. Weeks (50289).
- G. D. Weinstock (109041), RAFVR.
- A. J. Wells (158469), RAFVR.
- A. V. Wells (53333).
- G. L. Welton (143132), RAFVR.
- S. C. B. Welton (106298).
- C. E. White, CGM (174522), RAFVR.
- R. R. White (157017), RAFVR.
- W. D. G. Wilkes, DFM (173088), RAFVR.
- J. G. Wilkinson (102253), RAFVR.
- D. Williams (107817), RAFVR.
- T. Williams (110602), RAFVR.
- T. G. Williams (144161), RAFVR.
- H. Williamson (156825), RAFVR.
- W. W. Wilson (50545).
- F. A. Winter (130746), RAFVR.
- E. C. H. Withnall (108796), RAFVR.
- J. L. Wood (101253), RAFVR.
- O. D. Wood (86052), RAFVR.
- T. A. Woolley (144379), RAFVR.
- W. G. Wotton (47797), RAFVR.
- G. A. H. Wright (47508).
- J. A. Young (114997), RAFVR.

Flying Officers

- D. P. Adams (131735), RAFVR.
- W. T. Aitken (148332), RAFVR.
- W. H. M. Alexander (159811), RAFVR.
- H. J. Allin, BEM (52621).
- A. E. Ambrose (170854), RAFVR.
- D. Andrew (161725), RAFVR.
- R. C. Andrews (119968), RAFVR.
- H. T. Anning (52251).
- W. J. Arnot (132189), RAFVR.
- G. H. Ashton (49816).
- F. J. G. Askew (182567), RAFVR.
- L. H. Baggs (49344).
- W. G. H. Bailey (139183), RAFVR.
- S. D. Baldock, DFM (148100), RAFVR.
- S. F. Barker (110896), RAFVR.
- M. T. O. Bartlett (173914), RAFVR.
- A. E. Bashford, DFM (156135), RAFVR.
- J. A. Bate, DFC (171923), RAFVR.
- E. E. Baughan (161754), RAFVR.
- F. S. Beckett (158051), RAFVR.
- G. H. Bell (169274), RAFVR.
- I. Bellis (155226), RAFVR.
- R. Beveridge (122768), RAFVR.
- H. J. Bicknell (108342), RAFVR.
- W. L. Binns (142249), RAFVR.
- H. C. F. Blake (158155), RAFVR.
- N. J. Booth (135245), RAFVR.
- J. F. Boxell (138616), RAFVR.
- D. G. Boyd (126804), RAFVR.
- D. P. Brachi (102326), RAFVR.
- N. Bradbury (178514), RAFVR.
- H. Brazendale (50313).
- W. Bremner (144858), RAFVR.
- R. E. Brook (53296).
- W. R. Brooks (139063), RAFVR.
- J. Brough (132887), RAFVR.
- R. H. Brown (182010), RAFVR.
- A. F. Bryant (53410).
- W. R. Buckland (119801), RAFVR.
- J. E. Bunyan (175013), RAFVR.
- D. R. Carpender (183810), RAFVR.
- B. A. W. Chamberlain (130770), RAFVR.
- D. L. Chapman (110903), RAFVR.
- C. H. Cherry (148310), RAFVR.
- K. J. Chetwynd (140822), RAFVR.
- T. B. Clark (52221).
- F. Clarke (141047), RAFVR.
- C. A. L. Cuffe (144204), RAFVR.
- A. H. Coburn (123733), RAFVR.
- R. R. Collard (157534), RAFVR.
- A. Collinson (172724), RAFVR.
- W. W. Cooke, DFM (147312), RAFVR.
- F. A. Cooper (184780), RAFVR.
- P. F. Cooper (176644), RAFVR.
- A. E. Corbett (176115), RAFVR.
- M. J. Corcoran (174786), RAFVR.
- D. H. Court (146811), RAFVR.
- E. Cousins (158104), RAFVR.
- F. S. Graven (171176), RAFVR.
- W. J. Crimmin (157400), RAFVR.
- S. A. Critchley (52622).
- W. E. J. Cross (51660).
- F. Cunliffe (173301), RAFVR.
- R. D. Cunnison (155871), RAFVR.
- D. H. Curzon (183734), RAFVR.
- E. R. Davies (173285), RAFVR.
- J. Davies (144482), RAFVR.
- H. Dawson (178722), RAFVR.
- T. D. Dean (159492), RAFVR.
- W. J. Denman (112094), RAFVR.
- J. H. Dennis (108554), RAFVR.
- G. Denwood, DFC (53945).
- C. W. Dent (121068), RAFVR.
- N. J. De Verteuil (170477), RAFVR.
- E. Dickin (134467), RAFVR.
- S. S. H. J. Ditchfield (158168), RAFVR.
- P. W. Dod (102220), RAFVR.
- F. W. Doidge (182708), RAFVR.
- T. P. B. Doolan, DFM (169112), RAFVR.
- H. A. S. Doughty (151001), RAFVR.
- J. Duckworth (50152).
- S. G. E. Dugay (141039), RAFVR.
- C. H. J. Dungate (141241), RAFVR.
- J. T. Edge (131510), RAFVR.
- J. Edwards (172240), RAFVR (deceased).
- P. Elener (147862), RAFVR.
- W. J. G. Ellens (161561), RAFVR.
- D. Ellis (69471), RAFVR.
- L. Erridge (137755), RAFVR.
- A. Evans (187368), RAFVR.
- E. W. Evans (51091).
- J. W. Fathers (148201), RAFVR.
- L. F. V. Fawcett (170832), RAFVR.
- E. C. Fielder (140106), RAFVR.
- M. Fitzsimmons (105232), RAFVR.
- J. W. Fletcher (145933), RAFVR.
- L. C. Ford (123546), RAFVR.
- G. G. Fowler (51446), RAFVR.
- J. M. France (148841), RAFVR.
- S. N. Freestone, DFC (156092), RAFVR.
- G. Garland (140097), RAFVR.
- G. S. Gee (51451).
- W. H. George, DFC (159019), RAFVR.
- J. Gold (185516), RAFVR.
- R. J. Gooch, DFC (155361), RAFVR.
- G. A. Gough (178053), RAFVR.
- J. N. Gracie (55869), RAFVR.
- F. Green (160670), RAFVR.
- F. C. A. Hamilton (170556), RAFVR.
- P. L. Hanan (51358).
- S. N. Hancock (146908), RAFVR.
- J. Harman (173726), RAFVR.
- C. H. Harper (153382), RAFVR.
- B. Harris (143302), RAFVR.
- K. Harrison (110659), RAF Regiment.
- A. G. F. Hart (182580), RAFVR.
- G. S. Hart (51663).
- A. E. Hartnell (54127).
- I. Hastings (183367), RAFVR.
- H. W. Hawksley (54389).
- W. K. J. Haynes (175000), RAFVR.
- H. E. K. Heaton (159771).
- A. W. Henderson (130482), RAFVR.
- F. J. A. Henderson (161292), RAFVR.
- J. H. Henderson (143333), RAFVR.
- F. E. Hendy (52487).
- P. Heptonstall (160699), RAFVR.
- C. F. P. Hicks (148396).
- S. C. Hill (50689).
- C. Horrocks (134855), RAFVR.
- T. C. Horsey (112149).
- W. Houghton (148594), RAFVR.
- W. G. Howgill (112152), RAFVR.
- H. D. Hughes (50400).
- S. F. Hulme (146681), RAFVR.
- K. R. Ilott (137398), RAFVR.
- C. M. Jackson (139437), RAFVR.
- G. L. Jeffery (113195), RAFVR.
- G. Jenkins (52348).
- W. Jenkins (159132), RAFVR.
- R. A. Jennings (170816), RAFVR.
- D. Johnston (139773), RAFVR.
- I. Jones (169294), RAFVR.
- P. E. T. Jones, DFC (157627), RAFVR.
- T. E. P. Jones (123792), RAFVR.
- W. R. Jones (170555), RAFVR.
- J. Judd (81980), RAFVR.
- E. Julian (171015), RAFVR.
- H. M. A. Kay (141938), RAFVR.
- H. J. R. Kent (141029), RAFVR.
- H. E. Kippendale (54143).
- F. H. Kirby (138928), RAFVR.
- T. J. Kirkpatrick (112774), RAFVR.
- E. R. C. Knights (52442).
- W. Knowles (108719), RAFVR.
- W. V. Lane (155868), RAFVR.
- C. W. Leach (52443).
- G. N. Leighton (54847).
- J. B. Lend (73974), RAFVR (missing).
- D. S. Lettington (152831), RAFVR.
- E. Levy (157654), RAFVR.
- J. W. Lewis (53054).
- A. J. Lock (137895), RAFVR.
- J. P. Lyall (170812), RAFVR.
- L. A. Lytton (156489), RAFVR.
- R. J. McAusland (53053).
- I. McColl (183773), RAFVR.
- D. L McFee (187266) (missing).
- L M. Macintosh (158624).
- H. A. McKellar (140110), RAFVR.
- A. McKenzie (128661), RAFVR.
- J. M. McOmie (149382), RAFVR.
- D. H. Maling (141987), RAFVR.
- A. J. H. Martin (111753), RAFVR.
- R. M. Mathieson (178787), RAFVR.
- R. W. Measom (172275), RAFVR.
- E. J. Midlane (147283), RAFVR.
- J. A. Mirchandani (156849), RAFVR.
- T. A. J. Mitchell (156482), RAFVR.
- P. J. Moloney (173441), RAFVR.
- J. E. Morris (175271), RAFVR.
- R. R. Moulder (52970).
- G. E. Munday (144866), RAFVR.
- D. B. Murray (161890), RAFVR.
- G. Newman (141673), RAFVR.
- W. Noble (131714), RAFVR.
- R. Oddie (182760).
- J. F. T. Oldfield (174582), RAFVR.
- N. Osborne (139079), RAFVR.
- W. D. Paddy (54446).
- B. G. Pagnam (182758), RAFVR.
- E. R. Parsons (116481), RAFVR.
- J. A. Pattinson (140212), RAFVR.
- G. Napier-Pearn (111755), RAFVR.
- C. J. Pedley (157439), RAFVR.
- G. E. Penn (144507), RAFVR.
- N. F. Perryman (149159), RAFVR.
- W. O. Phillips (103206), RAFVR.
- L. W. Pilkington (130357), RAFVR.
- H. A. Preston (170824), RAFVR.
- J. M. J. Quarmby (170820), RAFVR.
- E. C. Quick (178034), RAFVR.
- J. D. Rae (174219), RAFVR.
- V. S. P. Ray (169245), RAFVR.
- H. Readman (145735), RAFVR.
- J. Reay ( 156923), RAFVR.
- W. J. Reid (132553), RAFVR.
- T. W. Reynolds (158766), RAFVR.
- K. Richards (168573), RAFVR.
- C. G. H. Ricketts (135952), RAFVR.
- E. A. Riseley (179074), RAFVR.
- O. Roberts (186708), RAFVR.
- R. W. Robertson (160896), RAFVR.
- E. Robinson (130123), RAFVR.
- J. K. Rodger (139638), RAFVR.
- G. E. C. Rodgers (149892), RAFVR.
- A. C. Roe (146189), RAFVR.
- 1. B. A. Rokes (106594), RAFVR.
- F. W. Rooke (158514), RAFVR.
- C. D. W. Rose (173203), RAFVR.
- H. A. E. Round (134809), RAFVR.
- L. A. Runciman (148578), RAFVR.
- H. Rushforth (157478), RAFVR.
- A. K. Rust (145130), RAFVR.
- K. R. Ryman (52403).
- R. Samson (52874).
- H. H. Sanders (132902), RAFVR.
- C. E. Scane (176845), RAFVR.
- N. Y. Schofield (111365), RAFVR.
- P. H. Scragg (54618).
- N. F. Searle (53029).
- A. T. Sennett (146981), RAFVR.
- S. C. W. Seymour (156476), RAFVR.
- C. J. Sharpe (171593), RAFVR.
- H. Sherman (123529), RAFVR.
- E. H. Sherwood (148242), RAFVR.
- M. H. Short (156219), RAFVR.
- J. W. Sides (135955). RAFVR.
- H. A. Simkins (186064), RAFVR.
- G. Sims (47346).
- H. R. Smith (157775), RAFVR.
- I. D. Smith (80463), RAFVR.
- J. Smith (53662).
- J. A. Smith (137182), RAFVR.
- N. Smith (52468).
- G. H. Sparkes (145218), RAFVR.
- F. Stanford (179005), RAFVR.
- J. E. Staples, DFM (169006), RAFVR.
- J. Stephen (179545), RAFVR.
- J. W. Still (161079), RAFVR.
- J. K. Straker (134237), RAFVR.
- C. W. Sugden (143522), RAFVR.
- F. Sutcliffe (160809), RAFVR.
- H. T. Swan (128837), RAFVR.
- G. R. Talbott (137976), RAFVR.
- J. J. Tarling (185683), RAFVR.
- D. Tasker (146979), RAFVR.
- H. I. Taylor (137977), RAFVR.
- H. W. H. Taylor (161512), RAFVR.
- L. S. Taylor (159633), RAFVR.
- R. Y. Taylor (144510), RAFVR.
- D. F. J. Tebbit (156650), RAFVR.
- J. A. Thomas (140188), RAFVR.
- L. P. Thomas (110621), RAFVR.
- H. D. Thompson (147724), RAFVR.
- W. R. Thompson (114972), RAFVR.
- E. E. Thomson (174295), RAFVR.
- J. Thomson (50761).
- J. B. Thomson (173822), RAFVR.
- F. R. Thornton (170573), RAFVR.
- C. L. Thorp (175680), RAFVR.
- J. Towey (161318), RAFVR.
- G. S. Tumman (156298), RAFVR.
- P. A. Tunmer (107683), RAFVR.
- J. V. Tynan (175958), RAFVR.
- A. R. Van Der Heyden (162081), RAFVR.
- F. J. Vernon (50654).
- D. L. Vinall (131667), RAFVR.
- J. W. Vinall (169518) (missing).
- S. A. Walker (139776), RAFVR.
- J. H. Waller (143281), RAFVR.
- M. Salway-Waller (127449), RAFVR.
- R. M. Watson (171080), RAFVR.
- D. H. Webb (114425), RAFVR.
- H. F. Webster (153493), RAFVR.
- W. R. Wells (162716), RAFVR.
- J. Whalley (148662), RAFVR.
- H. A. Whiley (169840), RAFVR.
- J. H. White (170794), RAFVR.
- R. E. J. White (49470).
- F. S. Whittaker (158880), RAFVR.
- S. Whittaker (171131), RAFVR.
- C. Wilkinson (173708), RAFVR.
- P. F. Wilks (182882), RAFVR.
- F. G. Williams (143648), RAFVR.
- D. Wilson (123978), RAFVR.
- I. T. Wilson (177659), RAFVR.
- C. G. Wing (54277).
- C. S. Wood (54110), RAFVR.
- S. C. Woodham (148803), RAFVR.
- G. R. Woodward (146978), RAFVR.
- F. H. Worsfold (151082), RAFVR.
- F. L. Wright (113480), RAFVR.

Pilot Officers

- W. Andrews (188090), RAFVR.
- A. B. Campbell (186290), RAFVR.
- R. R. L. K. Carson (187936), RAFVR.
- W. Gilchrist (117943), RAFVR.
- E. J. Holden (162656), RAFVR.
- J. T. Hutchinson (169218), RAFVR.
- J. M. Jack (169710), RAFVR.
- R. Lee (56464).
- I. F. H. McKenna (174697), RAFVR.
- A. G. Payne (184746.), RAFVR.
- F. P. Platt (185771), RAFVR.
- W. J. D. Powell (182571), RAFVR.
- A. Richards (187106), RAFVR.
- E. J. H. Roberts (185446), RAFVR.
- H. Rose (130757), RAFVR.
- G. Squires (121999), RAFVR.
- R. P. Townsend (187921), RAFVR.
- I. G. Walker (188562), RAFVR.
- T. Ward (188545), RAFVR.
- W. E. Watkins (162644), RAFVR.

Warrant Officers

- E. Albone (1221687), RAFVR.
- A. Allan (1112055), RAFVR.
- E. A. Andrews (743973), RAFVR.
- J. T. Appleyard (335493).
- T. W. Atkinson (349828).
- J. W. Averis (944561), RAFVR.
- G. H. Baker (562031).
- W. H. Barnett (510842).
- L. J. Bassett (562433).
- J. Bateson (550830).
- G. W. Baxter (1017140), RAFVR.
- R. Bennett (352392).
- H. L. Birbeck (363859).
- T. W. Black (656823).
- H. J. Booth (1107464), RAFVR.
- P. Braithwaite (347870).
- D. W. Brimble (364533).
- H. W. Broom (335663).
- J. Brown (1065710), RAFVR.
- J. J. Brown (564537).
- T. W. C. Buckle (336300).
- R. H. Buley (140426).
- H. L. Burleton (1575900), RAFVR.
- S. A. Burness (590745).
- E. L. Butcher (335794).
- E. G. Carr (365215).
- F. V. Carter (364542).
- C. R. Castleton (1439195), RAFVR.
- A. W. Chaplin (224213).
- C. E. Chaplin (1316801), RAFVR.
- J. J. Chase (334135).
- B. P. Collins (629665).
- R. W. Collins (907633), RAFVR.
- B. Cooke (515220).
- K. R. Cookson (1499896), RAFVR.
- R. H. Cooper (567912).
- W. T. Cooper (344831).
- S. Cross (1218972), RAFVR.
- G. W. Culham (1318522), RAFVR.
- L. Cunningham (1078549), RAFVR.
- J. P. Deal (1282935), RAFVR.
- S. A. J. De Souza (238327).
- D. W. Davies (928524), RAFVR.
- R. Dixon (561099).
- D. Dodson (1199997), RAFVR.
- W. H. Dolman (328914).
- J. R. Donald (1124479), RAFVR.
- A. G. Donovan (560744).
- C. Dorlin (550018).
- W. Elliott (509664).
- J. Emery (508589).
- E. C. H. Estall (611762).
- E. H. Evans (970887), RAFVR.
- J. H. Evans (565505).
- B. Exley (353687).
- H. J. Fagg (343548).
- A. W. French (349263).
- T. H. B. Furness (553857).
- S. G. Gaskin (26126).
- C. E. Gates (352161).
- E. Geal (615197).
- J. C. Gibson (1168675), RAFVR.
- L. E. Glitheroe (513798).
- T. A. Godfrey (351856).
- C. T. Graham (335739).
- R. Greenhalgh (512619).
- F. E. Craven-Griffiths (354837).
- G. L. Guttridge (975331), RAFVR.
- C. E. Barker (1305446), RAFVR.
- R. Harrison (330868).
- A. H. Hart (361986).
- W. Hartley (808045), RAFVR.
- G. H. Hawkey (1314356), RAFVR.
- P. J. Healy (288034).
- S. A. Heard (1318212), RAFVR.
- H. W. Herridge (356982).
- J. M. Hewett (1338781), RAFVR.
- K. F. Hickman (590846).
- T. R. Kitchen (349868).
- W. H. Hodgson (1313893), RAFVR.
- T. J. Hooper (1310880), RAFVR.
- N. J. Horder (364031).
- B. Horrobin (514135).
- J. H. Horsfall (561562).
- J. Hough (1454677), RAFVR.
- J. G. Howell (568037).
- J. D. Howells (1530990), RAFVR.
- H. Ibbotson (1300387), RAFVR.
- B. R. Jacobs (363337).
- S. R. J. James (364010).
- G. F. Johnson (928614), RAFVR.
- P. W. Johnson (363012).
- G. F. Deable (346623).
- W. H. Keast (351574).
- D. C. Keith (363431).
- J. F. Kelly (965347), RAFVR.
- A. A. E. King (349344).
- S. W. King (1383916), RAFVR.
- R. W. Lacey (514408).
- T. R. Lacey (846050), RAFVR.
- R. W. Ladd (1245614), RAFVR.
- E. F. Lane (1317828), RAFVR.
- B. D. Larner (366132).
- S. F. Leaman (335645).
- B. H. Lees (508945).
- E. Limerick (510502).
- J. Linton (330291).
- A. J. Lodge (358237).
- J. H. Lodge (363171).
- J. R. M. Luly (562186).
- D. J. McGready (357328).
- W. C. McLean (550342).
- A. P. Maingot (605475).
- A. H. Maltby (352879).
- L. R. Mattravers (540087).
- D. G. Metcalfe (362057).
- H. A. Middleton.
- L. S. Milburn (510856).
- H. H. Miller (511176).
- J. Moir (362449).
- E. J. Morgan (521893).
- E. Morris (982855), RAFVR.
- E. A. Murden (331461).
- G. D. I. Neale (550892).
- W. A. Nicholson (347882).
- A. H. Norman (565120).
- H. Northrop (348320).
- L. E. Nunn (1302337), RAFVR.
- W. F. Osborne (357522).
- F. W. W. Page (761304), RAFVR.
- L. E. Parker (365586).
- A. A. Payne (91018).
- G. Perkins (505872).
- J. Phillips (1300313), RAFVR.
- C. S. Pierce (363197).
- F. B. Pilgrim (330377).
- G. W. Powell (863530), AAF.
- G. Price (178432).
- A. J. Randell (365789).
- F. Rawe (509179).
- E. R. Rawlings (530045).
- J. Redmond (1354554), RAFVR.
- G. H. Reeves (514151).
- R. E. Rennie (365357).
- J. J. Reynolds (514404).
- E. Rice (4431).
- S. R. Richardson (529175).
- F. Rickett (349922).
- D. A. Robinson (951321), RAFVR.
- S. A. Rose (243677).
- J. Rowley (95115).
- F. W. Salter (506551).
- G. Scott (1433776).
- E. Sears (342786).
- J. F. Sheekey (531819).
- O. W. Sherwood (562324).
- S. C. Shepherd (509920.
- R. H. Simmons (330580).
- E. P. Smith (1378234).
- L. H. M. Smith (516732).
- R. C. Snelling (520329).
- T. Solly (560208).
- N. K. Spicer (351026).
- A. H. Spring (656453).
- H. S. Steed (88085).
- A. R. Stewart (590891).
- E. C. Stokes (590557).
- T. Storey (1431804), RAFVR.
- H. Streeter (512180).
- J. C. Strickett (522717).
- G. Suffield (508562).
- W. G. Sugden (363246).
- E. W. Taylor (1071495), RAFVR.
- J. M. Thomas (1257994), RAFVR.
- R. V. Timpson (353548).
- H. T. Townsend (357291).
- T. W. Townshend (801555), AAF.
- J. W. Tredwell (1338166), RAFVR.
- R. J. B. Trim (906767), RAFVR.
- H. Turner (161676), RAFVR.
- J. F. Turner (363764).
- T. Turner (365071).
- S. Uttley (507419).
- M. H. Waite (580048).
- G. A. Weeks (363049).
- W. Wells (590308).
- H. W. Whent (512915).
- C. Whiting (344312).
- A. K. Wilch (1332579), RAFVR.
- H. R. Willis (741942), RAFVR.
- H. Wood (338182).
- P. A. Wood (934640), RAFVR.
- A. Woodsworth (885729), AAF.
- D. R. Woolnough (506286).
- G. H. Worlock (515075).
- M. W. Young (561755).
- R. J. Young (522246).
- E. G. Younge (514204).

Acting Warrant Officers

- J. E. Brazier (569904).
- E. S. Brook (809049), AAF.
- B. H. Heyhoe (540558).
- E. E. John (506990).
- G. T. V. Lawson (163885).
- A. D. Loten (591007).
- H. Maudsey (362428).
- A. W. Prangnell (560177).
- E. Taylor (534699).
- R. B. H. Thompson (353799).
- T. J. Woodcock (1169941), RAFVR.

Flight Sergeants

- 1265217 R. F. Addison, RAFVR.
- 750048 T. H. Albury, RAFVR.
- 540929 H. Alker.
- 510290 G. E. Allman.
- 528661 J. G. S. Anderson.
- 1009763 W. G. D. M. Anderson, RAFVR.
- 1318341 J. E. Ash, RAFVR.
- 359978 J. W. Ashby.
- 1394802 R. W. Ashman, RAFVR.
- 565060 J. Ashmore.
- 1335873 W. A. Atkins, RAFVR.
- 1390754 F. P. Averill, RAFVR.
- 1610749 G. C. Baker, RAFVR.
- 610496 F. C. Bancroft.
- 519903 J. H Banks.
- 507742 W. W. Barber.
- 1391772 R. A. Barrett, RAFVR.
- 521507 C. J. Bartlett.
- 565501 A. H. Bartrop.
- 1808147 R. H. Bateman, DFM, RAFVR.
- 509276 C. Batty.
- 526997 J. G. Beckett.
- 570386 J. Beedle.
- 506562. F. T Bibey.
- 534478 E. M. Bickle.
- 365727 E. W. Billinger.
- 998097 J. D. Soden-Bird, RAFVR.
- 565867 H. W. Blackney.
- 565065 R. S. Blunden.
- 546264 W. H. G. Bodley.
- 753579 L. E. Booth, RAFVR.
- 513496 E. L. Boskett.
- 568430 P. E. Boult.
- 411691 J. Bowden.
- 1893976 D. A. Brett, RAFVR.
- 1395596 A. V. Bridle, RAFVR.
- 760638 C. H. Brooks, RAFVR.
- 563037 J. Brophy.
- 653957 L. A. Brown.
- 561471 M. Brown
- 358739 W. Brown.
- 529905 J. Buckley.
- 537124 H. Bullock.
- 998497 N. H. Bulmer, RAFVR.
- 509420 P. J. Burke.
- 882586 T. M. Burke, AAF.
- 328442 J. S. Burrows.
- 1107843 T. Burton, RAFVR.
- 954196 A. Butterworth, RAFVR.
- 563638 T. Campbell.
- 636119.A. W. Card.
- 1014362 J. A. Carter, RAFVR.
- 531996 W. A. Carter.
- 743454 J. E. Carver, RAFVR.
- 250499 R. Catterall.
- 35915 S. E. Cattermole.
- 537591 F. R. Chamberlain.
- 1430560 S. J. Chaisty, RAFVR.
- 561088 C. Clarke.
- 241060 G. H. Clarke.
- 364801 N. C. F. Clay.
- 550401 R. A. R. Cleverley.
- 507057 T. S. Cochran.
- 1580521 T. H. Cockeram, RAFVR.
- 1334908 R. P. Codd, RAFVR.
- 522116 R. G. Codling.
- 1263073 A. O. Coker, RAFVR.
- 1172612 F. W. Coleman, RAFVR.
- 354143 S. F. Coleman.
- 1255059 H. Collett, RAFVR.
- 804262 E. J. Cole, AAF.
- 929648 H. R. K. Collingridge, RAFVR.
- 908318 B. A. Collins, RAFVR.
- 88957 L. R. Collins, AAF.
- 616415 W. J. F. Collins.
- 560568 A. S. Collison.
- 6989 L. J. Connor.
- 564159 R. G. Cook.
- 561074 R. H. Cook.
- 560050 J. T. Cooke.
- 265088 C. C. Cooper.
- 635083 R. W. Cooper.
- 103968 W. Cooper, RAFVR.
- 192350 W. H. Cooper.
- 505247 C. Cosgrove.
- 366248 S. C. Coulson.
- 550644 K. V. Coveney.
- 550328 W. V. Cowdry.
- 509072 R. F. Crane.
- 566664 E. F. C. Croucher.
- 223106 A. E. Daniel.
- 537124 E. Darbyshire.
- 1114002 J. R. Dathan, RAFVR.
- 502400 R. G. Davies.
- 522305 A. C. Davis.
- 564152 A. E. Day.
- 517124 M. S. Day.
- 567566 K. Dickins.
- 750901 J. W. Dines, RAFVR.
- 580051 G. G. Dixon.
- 97474 R. M. Dixon.
- 1107303 H. E. Dobson, RAFVR.
- 756036 T. Dodd, RAFVR.
- 770488 C. W. Dunn, RAFVR.
- 352753 R. A. Dunn.
- 566413 S. F. Dunn.
- 761401 C. S. Dueling, RAFVR.
- 1045725, W. J. Eames.
- 562538 N. J. D. Edwards.
- 623717 E. G. Ellis.
- 509686 R. Evans.
- 347467 W. H. E. Facey.
- 1511188 T. P. Fargher, RAFVR.
- 1577470 S. T. Farmiloe.
- 250674 W. O. Faulkes.
- 513173 D. Fearnley.
- 1661231 V. M. Fenn.
- 563449 R. G. Ferrier.
- 24212 A. S. Finch.
- 1445886 H. Finch, RAFVR.
- 658824 H. Fitton.
- 567528 J. L. Fitzgerald.
- 526842 S. E. Fluck.
- 590811 D. C. Fortesque.
- 562569 A. H. Foster.
- 562119 W. A. Foster.
- 657513 V. R. Fox.
- 1151940 E. Freer.
- 364907 N. S. Fuller.
- 1354976 J. Gascoigne, RAFVR.
- 1255314 P. Gash, RAFVR.
- 546083 J. A. T. Gawler.
- 1176310 W. B. J. Gidley, RAFVR.
- 799875 A. Gidlow, RAFVR.
- 560138 C. P. Gilbert.
- 566310 A. F. Godden.
- 82898 J. Godley.
- 505870 D. Golphin.
- 1258877 J. F. Goddess, RAFVR.
- 1684259 W. Goriah, RAFVR.
- 364908 L. R. Gray.
- 213852 R. G. Gray.
- 157297 R. S. Green.
- 1461473 T. J. Green, RAFVR.
- 1394704 R. A. C. Gregory, RAFVR.
- 353234 W. P. Hadoon.
- 1369655 W. Halbert, RAFVR.
- 517787 S. Hamilton.
- 1588288 I. Hardman.
- 1398657 J. Harris, RAFVR.
- 569253 D. Harrison.
- 567551 N. O. Harvey.
- 1133810 F. G. Hazel.
- 534617 N. C. O. Head.
- 562098 W. E. Hearn.
- 970262 W. Hearns, RAFVR.
- 563005 A. Hedley.
- 155867 F. C. Heimsath.
- 746579 A. E. Hewitt, RAFVR.
- 564216 A. Hewson.
- 538010 J. C. Hillman.
- 756064 C. C. Hirst, RAFVR.
- 525141 R. E. Hoare.
- 524820 A. Hogben.
- 562284 F. G. W. Hoile.
- 562132 J. Hollinshead.
- 529519 A. J. Holmes.
- 1322069 J. Holmes.
- 1238498 V. E. Horn, RAFVR.
- 357942 J. Horne.
- 613032 C. F. Horsley.
- 567341 P. S. Hose.
- 568365 D. J. Hoskins.
- 365743 L. F. Hotham.
- 330296 G. I. Hounam.
- 896028 M. L. Houston, AAF.
- 523443 F. Howes.
- 770732 H. J. Huggett, RAFVR.
- 364098 W. C. Hutchins.
- 1067234 A. Hutchinson, RAFVR.
- 631668 C. H. Izard.
- 518850 H. C. Jeckells.
- 750011 A. J. Jenkins, RAFVR.
- 357076 H. Jenner.
- 511094 C. I. John.
- 512215 G. John.
- 509518 A. G. A. Johnson.
- 759289 G. H. E. Johnson, RAFVR.
- 540983 R. C. R. Johnston.
- 370843 C. E. Jones.
- 1103878 E. M. Jones, RAFVR.
- 507925 J. F. Jones.
- 352168 J. E. Kaye.
- 997811 A. S. H. Keightley, RAFVR.
- 950044 G. King, RAFVR.
- 618053 R. W. Lace.
- 363434 C. B. Lacey.
- 526073 W. P. Laity.
- 1178376 F. H. Lawrence, RAFVR.
- 1151598 E. G. Lee, RAFVR.
- 326537 E. G. Lee.
- 1176833 R. A. Lister, RAFVR.
- 1205088 S. J. Loader, RAFVR.
- 565185 H. V. Lonnon.
- 538398 D. J. Loudon.
- 516808 E. N. Love.
- 641662 H. D. R. Lovitt.
- 566323 W. F. T. Lucas.
- 560653 G. D. Lumsden.
- 1158778 A. H. Lunn, RAFVR.
- 568601 W. H. Mcdonald.
- 344459 H. W. T. Mcfarlane.
- 349568. R. D. McIntosh.
- 366340 T A. McIntyre.
- 5548 A. S. Mackenzie.
- 365301 H. B. Mack.
- 532631 J. R. Mainwaring.
- 531933 W. Maskill.
- 1469853 E. J. Maslin, RAFVR.
- 562583 A. E. Mayall.
- 506658 R. T. A. Medway.
- 565918 R. I. Mee.
- 969998 N G. Mason, RAFVR.
- 1295938 J. R. Michell, RAFVR.
- 508972 V. F. Mitchell.
- 564799 H. Monkman.
- 563486 F. J. Moreman.
- 539325 J. R. Morgan.
- 563672 W. M. T. Morgan.
- 986770 G. L. Moses, RAFVR.
- 936790 P. J. Mulbregt, RAFVR.
- 533250 G. H. Mummery.
- 564037 J. P. Murphy.
- 551236 L. A. Myers.
- 1175345 W. Nesbitt, RAFVR.
- 157993 E. C. W. Nicholls.
- 1801886 J. S. Norris, RAFVR.
- 517063 T. E. Nugent.
- 591014 W. J. Nye.
- 560186 J. M. O'Connor.
- 349188 E. O'Donnell.
- 808279 P. O'Donnell, AAF.
- 507114 T. W. Oxberry.
- 1113490 G. Owen, RAFVR.
- 1126532 J. T. Partridge, RAFVR.
- 1026066 I. Paton, RAFVR.
- 1075398 T, Patterson, RAFVR.
- 566195 N. H. Pearce.
- 619433 C. Pitchford.
- 338218 D. H. Please.
- 613705 N. W. Pollard.
- 511548 A. G. Powley.
- 567024 F. R. Pratt.
- 1201410 A. G. Presland, RAFVR.
- 1259083 C. G. Priest, RAFVR.
- 516455 E. Priestley.
- 896988 J. Proctor, AAF.
- 977013 J. L. Purdy, RAFVR.
- 1586404 A. J. Purnell, RAFVR.
- 519120 C. Pye.
- 533172 W. J. Quinn.
- 881690 K. S. Rayer, AAF.
- 1621358 R. W. Raysom, RAFVR.
- 924984 C. G. Reat, RAFVR.
- 564003 H. Rees.
- 647988 G. Reid.
- 512878 J. Rennison.
- 521885 R. Renton.
- 1586587 E. J. Reynolds, RAFVR.
- 525861 C. Ridley.
- 973735 W. Rigby, RAFVR.
- 334338 A. Roberts.
- 1179561 P. Roberts, RAFVR.
- 803293 J. M. Robertson, AAF.
- 591116 R. Robertson.
- 1078815 W. Robinson, RAFVR.
- 1061430 K. W. Rolls, RAFVR.
- 620332 W. J. Rousseau.
- 1391469 J. T. Rowles, RAFVR.
- 770377 S. Ruff, RAFVR.
- 328657 H. C. Russell.
- 1346184 M. H. Sakol, RAFVR.
- 566588 J. H. Salt.
- 1177489 F. R. Sambrook, RAFVR.
- 561626 K. G. Saunders.
- 991609 C. Scothern, RAFVR.
- 1695860 A. G. M. Scott, RAFVR.
- 366378 L. A. Scott.
- 760084 J. H. Seddon, RAFVR.
- 916382 E. C. Selfe, RAFVR.
- 646806 A. Senior.
- 562315 A. Severn.
- 523953 T. Shannon.
- 841649 A. Sharp, AAF.
- 939150 W. Shaw, RAFVR.
- 565828 E. W. Shorthouse.
- 912433 L. F. G. Silk, RAFVR.
- 535049 D. E. Simons.
- 566755 R. A. Simpson.
- 568309 A. A. Smith.
- 549596 G. A. Smith.
- 630516 G. A. Smith.
- 563992 G. J. Smith.
- 551322 W. G. Smith.
- 1365412 P. C. Somers, RAFVR.
- 1607026-3. R. W. Soper, RAFVR.
- 518414 A. Spooner.
- 364733 W. Springate.
- 515546 L. G. Steele.
- 1284255 R. C. Stone, RAFVR.
- 947474 J. Stott, RAFVR.
- 565665 W. S. Strickland.
- 411330 A. E. Stuchbury.
- 635500 F. A. Sullman.
- 516633 E. J. Swallow.
- 979671 H. A. Swift, RAFVR.
- 1334160 D. F. Tams, RAFVR.
- 563276 C. Tattersall.
- 1865913 S. A. J. Taylor, RAFVR.
- 626891 A. C. Teskey.
- 359553 A. G. Tester.
- 744374 J. E. Thake, RAFVR.
- 1104574 D. Thomas, RAFVR.
- 539226 R. V. Thomas.
- 560931 D. Thompson.
- 1159219 F. T. Thompson, RAFVR.
- 529584 C F. Thomson.
- 893238 M D. Thorburn, AAF.
- 847527 P. J. Thornton, AAF.
- 329343 T. Thornton.
- 535874 J. Thwaite.
- 519148 M. E. Tilling.
- 894741 I. M. Timms, RAFVR.
- 550559 A. H. Tipton.
- 352331 F. A. Todd.
- 570436 A. F. Tokeley.
- 525601 K. R. Tomkins.
- 1568840 P. Toner, RAFVR.
- 567317 L. A. Tovey.
- 626458 R. L. Travers.
- 740099 F. M. Trier, RAFVR.
- 659170 E. Turner.
- 335730 J. Turner.
- 359820 L. S. Turner.
- 564397 R. F. Twigg.
- 1323136 L. R. Underwood, RAFVR.
- 530508 D. Valentine.
- 572085 R. McD. Veitch.
- 562938 P. C. Vigar.
- 516823 H. Waddington.
- 937630 T. E. Wagstaff, RAFVR.
- 563308 F. Watte.
- 934912 F. Walker, RAFVR.
- 537369 E. Wallwork.
- 366478 A. E. Walter.
- 329792 E. H. Walker.
- 522128 T. P. Walker.
- 106770 A. E. Waller.
- 1624186 A. W. Warburton, RAFVR.
- 1213616 S. H. Waring, RAFVR.
- 510653 R. P. Watkin.
- 1562725 R. A. Watson, RAFVR.
- 10592 R. J. Watson.
- 991028 T. A. Watson, RAFVR.
- 1232150 C. Watts, RAFVR.
- 1522803 P. I. Watts, RAFVR.
- 539370 E. Webster.
- 335793 W. L. Whenlock.
- 565047 J. T. WlLdman.
- 1549414 T. Wilks, RAFVR.
- 902036 C. G. Willett, RAFVR.
- 1621238 C. A. Williams, RAFVR.
- 1312245 F. A. Wiltshire, RAFVR.
- 520159 J. P. Winspear.
- 353703 J. Withers.
- 544096 A. H. Woollard.
- 1006450 H. J. Wood, RAFVR.
- 1321252 R. Wood, RAFVR.
- 566429 C. Wright.
- 569208 I. A. Wright.
- 1261320 L. F. R. Yeo.
- 359783 G. H. Yockney.
- 364745 R. J. Young.
- 1870237 W. B. Young, RAFVR.

Acting Flight Sergeants

- 770115 W. Allan, RAFVR.
- 1357731 R. H. Amis, RAFVR.
- 336726 E. Bemrose.
- 523640 R. Bill.
- 548657 S. E. E. Bint.
- 973354 A. F. W. Bradley, RAFVR.
- 338312 M. F. Brereton.
- 622755 E. J. Briggs.
- 510562 E. A. Chaplin.
- 1258635 F. M. Cockcroft, RAFVR.
- 753245 H. J Connorton, RAFVR.
- 523268 J. Crabtree.
- 974367 W. E. Cramb, RAFVR.
- 970370 C. E. Dawkins, RAFVR.
- 1309633 W. Dixon, RAFVR.
- 632477 P. Docherty.
- 753656 E. W L. Edwards, RAFVR.
- 1053038 H. C. Healey, RAFVR.
- 1629211 C. Hancock, RAFVR.
- 359114 S. F. Hare.
- 1365750 M. Hoses, RAFVR.
- 1159488 R. E. Jefferies, RAFVR.
- 455960 R. E. Marr-Johnson.
- 230861 J. H. Knight.
- 1122444 A. L. K. Lamb, RAFVR.
- 702156 C. A. Lambert, RAFVR.
- 956423 A. G. Levitt, RAFVR.
- 411373 G. H. Longhurst.
- 1000286 J. H. Mann, RAFVR.
- 252850 H. A. Marsh.
- 2099855 M. M. Marson, RAFVR.
- 591403 N. E. Notley.
- 349873 W. F. T. Peall.
- 529366 L. Pearce.
- 551217 G. O. Pryce.
- 3566608 C. W. Roden.
- 756055 C. J. Rowlinson, RAFVR.
- 1106380 J. C. Scott, RAFVR.
- 1310904 T. A. Stewart, RAFVR.
- 530393 J. L. Stringfellow.
- 989083 D. H. M. Terras, RAFVR.
- 917350 B. G. Thornton, RAFVR.
- 1192518 W. Tuke, RAFVR.
- 634860 V. J. T. Vine.
- 1211065 A. Warden, RAFVR.
- 925654 W. H. Williams, RAFVR.
- 1283776 L. A. Woodford, RAFVR.
- 1554084 T. H. Woods, RAFVR.
- 1044278 D. Wright, RAFVR.
- 907275 R. E. Young, RAFVR.

Sergeants

- 568429 L. S. Abbott.
- 570093 R. Alford.
- 1356254 A. E. Allen, RAFVR.
- 591886 L. G. Allen.
- 1301073 T. Allen, RAFVR.
- 1199065 J. F. Andrew, RAFVR.
- 914275 R. A. Archer, RAFVR.
- 1368506 J. W. Armstrong, RAFVR.
- 105292. F. W. Arthur.
- 353200 E. H. Ashley.
- 516648 R. F.Ashton.
- 1054829 S. G. Ashworth, RAFVR.
- 1004931 E. Aspinall, RAFVR.
- 1003845 T. Atkinson, RAFVR.
- 1831050 G. R. C. Aylward, RAFVR.
- 1168793 J. Baggott, RAFVR.
- 625243 J. Baird.
- 1053785 W. R. Baird, RAFVR.
- 1477538 H. C. Baker, RAFVR.
- 1239192 J. Baker, RAFVR.
- 1353953 S. A. Baker, RAFVR.
- 972363 A. Ball, RAFVR.
- 928241 G. H. Ball, RAFVR.
- 1406491 R. Banbury, RAFVR.
- 522793 T. A. F. Banks.
- 529992 J. Bann.
- 1336395 W. T. Bannar, RAFVR.
- 1305418 G. E. Bass, RAFVR.
- 1474098 W. W. Bateson, RAFVR.
- 534549 O. Baum.
- 775398 H. Bauman, RAFVR.
- 6568 A. H. Bax.
- 521416 R. C. Baxter.
- 1254335 W. W. Beagley, RAFVR.
- 1203156 L. E. Beastall, RAFVR.
- 1356948 L. F. Beckett, RAFVR.
- 1190143 R. C. Beek, RAFVR.
- 1193510 A. H. Bell, RAFVR.
- 912879 N. Bell, RAFVR.
- 573211 P. R. Bennedik.
- 1063396 G. Bennett, RAFVR.
- 903912 R. D. Bennett, RAFVR.
- 2221150 W. G. Bennett, RAFVR.
- 1641605 W. Bentley, RAFVR.
- 1630033 A. W. S. Bevis, RAFVR.
- 903500 W. R. Birbeck, RAFVR.
- 1300088 J. E. V. Birch, RAFVR.
- 913476 F. H. Bishop, RAFVR.
- 1177292 H. C. Blackborow, RAFVR.
- 945947 T. H. Blackburn, RAFVR.
- 937986 E. D. Blackwell, RAFVR.
- 1378451 R. Blamires, RAFVR.
- 1429943 T. A. Blewett, RAFVR.
- 528431 H. G. Bloom.
- 771014 E. W. Blowman, RAFVR.
- 903838 H. C. W. Blundell, RAFVR.
- 346599 P. F. Blythe.
- 992788 J. B. McI. Bolam, RAFVR.
- 1446978 E. L. Bond, RAFVR.
- 568059 E. Border.
- 920111 C Bowden, RAFVR.
- 1172618 R. W. Bowring, RAFVR.
- 335217 L. Boxall.
- 1613044 D. H. Bradbury, RAFVR.
- 1207234 S. T. Brennan, RAFVR.
- 1411429 E. Brenner, RAFVR.
- 760050 E. A. Bridgett, RAFVR.
- 519576 E. J. Briscoe.
- 544701 S. G. Briscoe.
- 548244 S. Brookfield.
- 335096 W. E. Brooks.
- 969432 D. Brown, RAFVR.
- 815127 F. D. Brown, AAF.
- 955512 F. W. Brown.
- 640316 R. L. Brown.
- 1673608 E. J. Budd, RAFVR.
- 1155193 R. W. Bull, RAFVR.
- 591883 A. E. Bullivent.
- 1156884 N. H. Bumstead, RAFVR.
- 542951 J. H. Bunyard.
- 283590 F. Burbidge.
- 701601 F. E. Burnett, RAFVR.
- 954146 G. Burt, RAFVR.
- 553229 C. Bushell.
- 743819 F. T. Butchart, RAFVR.
- 352866 B. F. Butler.
- 1357496 N. H. Butler, RAFVR.
- 1622891 J. A. Byrne, RAFVR.
- 625449 J. T. Cairns.
- 956353 A. J. Camp, RAFVR.
- 1681965 W. Campbell, RAFVR.
- 567478 W. C. Canton.
- 701616 T. Carlyle, RAFVR.
- 915126 B. J. W. Carter, RAFVR.
- 355780 H. E. Carter.
- 1853248 D. Cattle, RAFVR.
- 520367 C. A. Cave.
- 1619432 R. W. Cavender, RAFVR.
- 1034406 F. C. Challands, RAFVR.
- 1063048 P. B. Chamberlain, RAFVR.
- 610038 A. L. Chichester.
- 623705 G. T Chrisp.
- 1067729 W. Christopherson, RAFVR.
- 632984 A. Chrystall.
- 569655 B. A. Church.
- 1222928 D. L. Church, RAFVR.
- 1251213 J. H. Churchill, RAFVR.
- 610263 R. G. Churchill.
- 1041510 L. H. B. Clamp, RAFVR.
- 1197874 R. S. Clark, RAFVR.
- 1010618 F. Clarke, RAFVR.
- 1259625 R. Clarke, RAFVR.
- 1875228 D. P. Cockle, RAFVR.
- 1256329 S. J. Cocksworth, RAFVR.
- 1215167 F. A. J. Coldwell, RAFVR.
- 770779 D. F. E. Coles, RAFVR.
- 1168681 G. Collins, RAFVR.
- 1392410 R. G. Collins, RAFVR.
- 566662 T. Connor, AAF.
- 1154110 E. G. Cook, RAFVR.
- 743986 L. C. F. Cook, RAFVR.
- 1257467 C. H. Cooksey.
- 1487191 L. A. Cookson, RAFVR.
- 1595345 D. C. Cooper, RAFVR.
- 546964 H. W. Cooper.
- 1153533 R. C. K. Cope, RAFVR.
- 617106 D. Corbett.
- 523289 E. Cosher.
- 990974 F. Cottam, RAFVR.
- 1095250 H. Y. Cousens, RAFVR.
- 1824595 J. N. Cowan, RAFVR.
- 1119603 J. Cowie, RAFVR.
- 1253331 L. A. Cowley, RAFVR.
- 1200336 A. C. Cranfield, RAFVR.
- 1326767 R. M. Cribb, RAFVR.
- 1004776 J. I. Crichton, RAFVR.
- 988342 W. Croft, RAFVR.
- 924872 D. C. Crooke, RAFVR.
- 1208768 L. J. Crosby, RAFVR.
- 618812 E. Cross.
- 1474141 H. Crowther, RAFVR.
- 755085 H. C. Crowther, RAFVR.
- 1670847 W. J. Crowther, RAFVR.
- 1100694 J. Cruise, RAFVR.
- 1.112847 G. H. Cullum, RAFVR.
- 545296 V. J. Cunningham.
- 1352437 L. Currie, RAFVR.
- 567508 E. E. Curtis.
- 1312861 E. P. Curtis, RAFVR.
- 531478 J. Cuthbert.
- 338172 C. R. Cutter.
- 1274762 W. F. Dadds, RAFVR.
- 520577 A. B. Daines.
- 571843 G. H. Dalton.
- 1191794 T. M. M. Daly, RAFVR.
- 551225 H. J. Daplyn.
- 1067580 T. Dargavel, RAFVR.
- 632512 B. Davies.
- 1103355 C. Davies, RAFVR.
- 572289 O. Davies.
- 618851 R. Davies.
- 1201910 R. L. Davies.
- 1116294 G. H. J. Davis, RAFVR.
- 1600962 G. W. Davis, RAFVR.
- 1265288 R. W. G. Day, RAFVR.
- 1159515 E. F. Deacon, RAFVR.
- 1156317 H. J. Deakin, RAFVR.
- 1084356 C. H. Dean, RAFVR.
- 1123246 H. Dean, RAFVR.
- 1509827 G. N. Debenham, RAFVR.
- 442032 J. B. Dell.
- 544770 R. E. S. De Naeyer.
- 1217036 G. W. Dennis, RAFVR.
- 614648 N. C. Devereux.
- 531302 G. H. Dewar.
- 1672409 J. McN. Dick, RAFVR.
- 906328 D. I. Dickie, RAFVR.
- 750402 H. J. Dix, RAFVR.
- 617662 A. K. Dinham.
- 991093 E. Dobson, RAFVR.
- 1256324 J. S. Dockerill, RAFVR.
- 1597119 W. H. Donaldson, RAFVR.
- 621303 G. Donnally.
- 346508 C. B. Dore.
- 525084 T. Drummond.
- 63047 F. C. Dryden.
- 807266 W. Dryden, RAFVR.
- 643310 A. Dugdale.
- 1582432 E. G. Durland, RAFVR.
- 744607 H. Dutton, RAFVR.
- 985336 R. P. Dye, RAFVR.
- 924413 C. G. H. Earl, RAFVR.
- 1384713 B. V. Eckbery, RAFVR.
- 1160505 C. Edwards, RAFVR.
- 1176075 F. R. Edwards, RAFVR.
- 647814 O. W. Edwards.
- 1137617 H. Elliott, RAFVR.
- 982363 G. A. Ellis, RAFVR.
- 701440 J. Ellis, RAFVR.
- 1326650 F. C. Emerson, RAFVR.
- 1076234 A. J. England, RAFVR.
- 974781 E. W. English, RAFVR.
- 635662 J. R. B. Ensor.
- 1180430 H. J. Eustace, RAFVR.
- 513146 F. G. Evans.
- 1237642 J. G. Evans, RAFVR.
- 947528 T. W. Evans, RAFVR.
- 909259 S. H. M. Everest, RAFVR.
- 1071176 F. Fagan, RAFVR.
- 569056 J. Fallon.
- 1851445 W. W. Farmer, RAFVR.
- 631820 D. H. Fear.
- 951662 J. K. Fenton, RAFVR.
- 933675 E. D. Fernley, RAFVR.
- 1193046 R. A. Field, RAFVR.
- 1177824 J. H. Finch, RAFVR.
- 1368015 J. Findlay, RAFVR.
- 1242059 F. Ford, RAFVR.
- 611859 D. W. Forster.
- 1205057 H. R. Fowler, RAFVR.
- 649967 F. D. Fox.
- 1264590 A. G. France, RAFVR.
- 1372847 J. W. J. Francis, RAFVR.
- 1490327 L. P. Franke, RAFVR.
- 542406 S. R. Freeman.
- 1154011 J. R. Fry, RAFVR.
- 509192 F. H. Furber.
- 507586 H. W. Gallop.
- 987771 E. R. Gamon, RAFVR.
- 519230 A. T. Gardiner.
- 348338 W. Gardiner.
- 1431576 H. S. Gardner, RAFVR.
- 1153734 P. J. Gatrell, RAFVR.
- 524901 W. Gault.
- 405673 C. H. George.
- 1076340 R. T. W. George, RAFVR.
- 1179801 M. A. E. Gifford, RAFVR.
- 1283123 E. C. Gilbert, RAFVR.
- 928156 O. H. Gilbert, RAFVR.
- 1252033 D. Gill, RAFVR.
- 972092 E. P. Gill, RAFVR.
- 538152 D. Gillies.
- 1624962 H. Glenny, RAFVR.
- 749871 S. E. Godley, RAFVR.
- 1197332 D. J. Golding, RAFVR.
- 752044 E. J. Gollop, RAFVR.
- 1119826 P. H. Goodchild, RAFVR.
- 1350061 D. Goodey, RAFVR.
- 644782 A. Goodison.
- 954064 O. T. Gorton, RAFVR.
- 551254 L. V. S. Gould.
- 938933 G. A. Grange, RAFVR.
- 526070 K. L. R. Gray.
- 1223070 H. G. Green, RAFVR.
- 626272 J. A. I. Greig.
- 523685 J. E. Grimwood.
- 618698 H. G. M. Gross.
- 569013 F. J. Guthrie.
- 968943 C. J. Hainge, RAFVR.
- 563798 W. R. Hall.
- 1420448 H. W. Halsey, RAFVR.
- 907108 J. E. Ham, RAFVR.
- 1555409 D. Hamilton, RAFVR.
- 1625413 H. L. Hammond, RAFVR.
- 1181603 S. D. Hammond, RAFVR.
- 1591980 G. Hand, RAFVR.
- 566513 P. G. Hann.
- 572673 M. B. S. Hanworth.
- 635647 H. R. Harding.
- 1254644 A. W. E. Hardwicke, RAFVR.
- 923691 D. K. Harris, RAFVR.
- 895619 I. Harrison, AAF.
- 571360 H. G. Hart.
- 743642 S. J. Hart, RAFVR.
- 957561 A. E. Hartshorn, RAFVR.
- 967722 T. C. Hastie, RAFVR.
- 914017 A. C. Hathaway, RAFVR.
- 1021569 J. Hatton, RAFVR.
- 530008 S. H. Hatton.
- 1039729 G. E. Haynes, RAFVR.
- 626150 B. G. Hayward.
- 918440 G. W. Hayward, RAFVR.
- 1259387 H. D. Hayward, RAFVR.
- 996394 J. A. Healey, RAFVR.
- 1106443 L. Heathfield, RAFVR.
- 1150813 J. W. Hemley, RAFVR.
- 1290720 W. L. Herbert, RAFVR.
- 1104145 S. Heyworth, RAFVR.
- 1062941 W. Hicks, RAFVR.
- 1444021 H. J. Hill, RAFVR.
- 612759 G. M. Hills.
- 1002955 G. Hindley, RAFVR.
- 523472 R. Hindshaw.
- 1533911 D. W. Hiscock, RAFVR.
- 702261 R. E. Hitchin, RAFVR.
- 1157070 C. Hobbs, RAFVR.
- 1329891 E. F. Holdsworth, RAFVR.
- 981524 J. G. Hole, RAFVR.
- 546492 L. A. D. Holley.
- 1302341 L. E. Hollins, RAFVR.
- 934520 N. G. Hollowell, RAFVR.
- 1194036 S. G. Holroyd, RAFVR.
- 801421 G. R. Hopgood, AAF.
- 1022675 W. Horrobin, RAFVR.
- 1355544 J. Horton, RAFVR.
- 1150743 W. H. Horton, RAFVR.
- 744871 P. H. Howard, RAFVR.
- 1079622 R. G. Howard, RAFVR.
- 1360440 W. R. S. Howie, RAFVR.
- 352984 W. T. Howl.
- 1513634 R. Hudson, RAFVR.
- 49647 R. S. Hudson.
- 340403 W. H. Huggett.
- 1326655 G. Hughes, RAFVR.
- 527530 A. D. L. Hulme.
- 1208693 S. Hurst, RAFVR.
- 1299601 F. J. Hutchings, RAFVR.
- 570736 T. D. Ingledow.
- 900756 E. C. Ingram, RAFVR.
- 522402 T. A. Ingroville.
- 1176609 T. Insull, RAFVR.
- 567118 J. W. Ireland.
- 932771 A. A. Jackson, RAFVR.
- 941445 G. E. Jackson, RAFVR.
- 774766 I. Jacobsen, RAFVR.
- 1162739 W. W. S. Jagg, RAFVR.
- 966146 E. H. James, RAFVR.
- 567974 K. W. James.
- 841382 N. A. C. James, AAF.
- 568736 G. M. Jarratt.
- 979943 H. J. Jenkins, RAFVR.
- 167276 L. Jennings.
- 624772 T. Jewell.
- 365517 C. T. Johns.
- 567600 A. Johnson.
- 505003 R. H. Johnson.
- 1421442 W. H. Johnson, RAFVR.
- 1062348 A. G. Jones, RAFVR.
- 956906 E. Jones, RAFVR.
- 1275873 F. A. Jones, RAFVR.
- 613651 L. R. Jones.
- 575583 S. R. Jones.
- 1060916 W. Jopson, RAFVR.
- 1453116 R. H. J. Joseph, RAFVR.
- 1446329 L. B. Journeaux, RAFVR.
- 1031165 C. F. S. Joyce, RAFVR.
- 1062477 J. Keeton, RAFVR.
- 2133047 A. E. Kenny, RAFVR.
- 546683 F. Kent.
- 1000518 J. B. T. Kerr, RAFVR.
- 612581 A. G. Kilby.
- 955726 J. C. Kilner, RAFVR.
- 537475 S. T. Kime.
- 357891 A. F. King.
- 1161409 D. N. King, RAFVR.
- 978593 J. R. King, RAFVR.
- 1629941 A. J. Kingham, RAFVR.
- 1478095 K. Kirby, RAFVR.
- 336950 E. Kirkham.
- 1182893 D. J. Kirton, RAFVR.
- 984077 I. Kitchener, RAFVR.
- 989486 J. Knaggs, RAFVR.
- 976490 D. H. Knight, RAFVR.
- 1241778 E. H. Ladbrooke, RAFVR.
- 911852 L. E. Laidlaw, RAFVR.
- 1009144 G. A. Laking, RAFVR.
- 757021 C. W. Lambert, RAFVR.
- 520490 R. Landamore.
- 1257969 E. E. Lane, RAFVR.
- 770705 F. E. Lane, RAFVR.
- 1153456 S. G. Large, RAFVR.
- 744834 W. Lawrence, RAFVR.
- 651849 J. B. Layton.
- 917437 A. L. Leeson, RAFVR.
- 1249368 E. Leigh, RAFVR.
- 1815943 K. W. R. Lester, RAFVR.
- 641542 H. Lewin.
- 962814 E. J. Lidstone, RAFVR.
- 610947 D. Lindsay.
- 570206 S. A. Lister.
- 1353110 K. Lloyd, RAFVR.
- 1067581 V. Logan, RAFVR.
- 1603850 J. S. Loomes, RAFVR.
- 1800942 H. J. Lorkin, RAFVR.
- 907078 F. Loveless, RAFVR.
- 982450 A. Lowe, RAFVR.
- 941155 S. B. Lowe, RAFVR.
- 972931 G. E. Lowery, RAFVR.
- 1143216 A. W. Lumb, RAFVR.
- 628616 F. Lynch.
- 534445 J. M. Lynn.
- 612174 L. Lyons.
- 1018426 I. McArdle, RAFVR.
- 1080502 H. McBride, RAFVR.
- 744394 C. McCartney, RAFVR.
- 533867 G. McChesney.
- 550202 E. L. MacDonald.
- 771322 G. B. W. McDonald, RAFVR.
- 1056158 J. Macdonald, RAFVR.
- 769770 J. MacDonald, RAFVR.
- 624817 G. R. McDowall.
- 533000 G. J. McFarlane.
- 992093 W. MacGregor, RAFVR.
- 770723 A. D. McInnes, RAFVR.
- 1011812 A. McLean, RAFVR.
- 534963 H. McLean
- 636109 H. McLean.
- 1542856 J. C. McManus, RAFVR.
- 916326 D. J. Major, RAFVR.
- 845851 D. E. Mann, AAF.
- 959639 E. Mannaghan, RAFVR.
- 1232650 K. Markland, RAFVR.
- 550256 H. Marsden.
- 1186187 L. M. W. Marshall, RAFVR.
- 1080799 T. Marshall, RAFVR.
- 574309 R. H. Mason.
- 1529993 J. F. Matthews, RAFVR.
- 1656373 D. J. Maxwell, RAFVR.
- 542509 H. Mellor.
- 962397 P. Millidge, RAFVR.
- 918104 A. B. Mills, RAFVR.
- 631673 K. H. Miroy.
- 1294480 E. Mitchell, RAFVR.
- 966498 G. W. Mitchell, RAFVR.
- 911284 R. Mitchell, RAFVR.
- 935426 A. Moore, RAFVR.
- 1121083 H. Moore, RAFVR.
- 1223219 P. O. Moore, RAFVR.
- 1171603 D. E. T. Morgan, RAFVR.
- 639953 A. E. Moss.
- 1002091 R. W. T. Mowtell, RAFVR.
- 523578 L. J. Movers.
- 997940 R. H. Mullen, RAFVR.
- 1866547 A. J. Mullord, RAFVR.
- 912557 P. R. Mully, RAFVR.
- 1568522 J. W. Mungo, RAFVR.
- 1171831 W. Munroe, RAFVR.
- 1176618 D. Nash, RAFVR.
- 1149441 E. L. Naylor, RAFVR.
- 802356 F. T. Nelson, AAF.
- 590772 R. Nicholson.
- 1326760 K. A. Nicol, RAFVR.
- 537754 A. A. Norris, RAFVR.
- 919780 H. F. Norris, RAFVR.
- 567094 R. H. Norris.
- 943673 A. E. Nunneley, RAFVR.
- 746421 H. J. Oaten, RAFVR.
- 747340 E. R. O'Brien, RAFVR.
- 960422 W. L. Oliver, RAFVR.
- 328335 W. C. Olivie.
- 1174588 S. O'Neill, RAFVR.
- 760802 C. A. Ormesher, RAFVR.
- 902963 W. B. Osborne, RAFVR.
- 1250903 F. L. Packard, RAFVR.
- 1463432 C. W. Pain, RAFVR.
- 642409 A. L. Park.
- 1600876 R. E. D. Parker, RAFVR.
- 512939 G. H. Partridge.
- 1557969 J. R. Parvin, RAFVR.
- 752168 C. A. Patman, RAFVR.
- 1188075 A. G. Patten, RAFVR.
- 922471 E. C. Pearce, RAFVR.
- 568377 E. J. Pearson.
- 974829 R. G. Peel, RAFVR.
- 1536797 E. H. Peers, RAFVR (deceased).
- 1192377 A. Peggs, RAFVR.
- 1181772 E. H. A. Penn, RAFVR.
- 1420241 H. E. Phillips, RAFVR.
- 511783 J. Phillips.
- 546036 A. N. Pipe.
- 900415 G. H. Piper, RAFVR.
- 986149 A. T. Pitt, RAFVR.
- 702337 A. Platt, RAFVR.
- 1314113 E. B. W. Poole, RAFVR.
- 971371 P. Porter, RAFVR.
- 1213947 L. N. Poulter, RAFVR.
- 751672 N. R. Powell, RAFVR.
- 47295 E. O. J. Prangnell.
- 1005245 E. P. Prentice, RAFVR.
- 564778 D. S. Price.
- 1171748 H. E. Price, RAFVR.
- 570743 H. J. Pringle.
- 920249 J. Prissell, RAFVR.
- 1191010 G. A. R. Pritchard, RAFVR.
- 358187 W. R. Pruden.
- 550996 L. A. Pullen.
- 292816 A. F. Raffe.
- 1012577 C. E. Ralph, RAFVR.
- 351996 H. T. Ralph.
- 591808 R. Ralph.
- 906577 A. E. J. Rank, RAFVR.
- 1058598 W. F. Reddington, RAFVR.
- 905878 R. V. C. Reed, RAFVR.
- 771533 B. A. E. Rees, RAFVR.
- 1193895 D. E. Rees, RAFVR.
- 969295 G. L. Rees, RAFVR.
- 1196437 A. J. A. Reynolds, RAFVR.
- 1253996 F. Ribbons, RAFVR.
- 1081723 C. Richardson, RAFVR.
- 634151 F. W. Richardson.
- 1473803 J. E. Richardson, RAFVR.
- 1192203 H. J. G. Riches, RAFVR.
- 1068179 J. M. Rimmer, RAFVR.
- 1173085 N. H. Rippon, RAFVR.
- 1083639 R. W. Risby, RAFVR.
- 518925 F. Roberts.
- 757426 H. D. Roberts, RAFVR.
- 743108 F. G. Robertson, RAFVR.
- 421650 V. E. Roberson.
- 617643 F. E. F. Robins.
- 9*5353 C. E. Rodgers, RAFVR.
- 993997 E. Rose, RAFVR.
- 642768 J. Rotherham.
- 1190752 B. K. Rowell, RAFVR.
- 352045 W. A. L. Roxburgh.
- 1054763 A. D. Royle, RAFVR.
- 1179926 W. H. Rubidge, RAFVR.
- 702838 D. F. Russell, RAFVR.
- 1148471 R. E. Ryder, RAFVR.
- 1673116 G. E. Salisbury, RAFVR.
- 1136981 F. K. Sansam, RAFVR.
- 1310398 J. R. Sargent. RAFVR.
- 1506467 C. Saunders, RAFVR.
- 613189 R. F. Saunders.
- 1230064 E. P. Savage, RAFVR.
- 1525040 J. R. Sayers, RAFVR.
- 1222725 S. Sayers, RAFVR.
- 746473 W. Scobie, RAFVR.
- 1505228 T. Scorah, RAFVR.
- 1108005 C. M. Scotford, RAFVR.
- 940512 P. R. Scott, RAFVR.
- 541771 E. F. Sedgwick.
- 2220714 E. S. Shaw, RAFVR.
- 1110486 C. Shepherd, RAFVR.
- 749166 C. G. Short, RAFVR.
- 1252356 G. S. Short, RAFVR.
- 1235255 D. C. Shrubshall, RAFVR.
- 1505228 G. W. Siddons, RAFVR.
- 923322 R. E. Slade, RAFVR.
- 1535622 J. Slater, RAFVR.
- 921598 F. J. Slatter, RAFVR.
- 1890323 E. A. Slaughter, RAFVR.
- 1124972 R. B. Smart, RAFVR.
- 975800 C. F. Smith, RAFVR.
- 538512 G. Smith.
- 889987 J. R. Smith, AAF.
- 1028205 P. Smith, RAFVR.
- 953584 R. Smith, RAFVR.
- 1260559 S. J. Smith, RAFVR.
- 645740 W. J. P. Smith.
- 744872 W. R. E. Smith, RAFVR.
- 1024251 C. Snape, RAFVR.
- 1181323 J. Sparks, RAFVR.
- 1017662 T. E. Sparrow, RAFVR.
- 972356 R. Spence, RAFVR.
- 924174 W. Spencer, RAFVR.
- 1086607 H. L. Spicer, RAFVR.
- 904980 A. E. Springett, RAFVR.
- 918039 R. W. Stalley, RAFVR.
- 810177 A. Stananought, AAF.
- 939843 C. R. Stead, RAFVR.
- 1134358 C. J. Stebbings, RAFVR.
- 1017896 F. W. E. Stelling, RAFVR.
- 637071 H. J. Stephens.
- 1193654 S. E. Stevens, RAFVR.
- 1073995 A. McK. Stewart, RAFVR.
- 631888 J. Stewart.
- 993374 R. J. Stewart, RAFVR.
- 1126836 C. H. Stitt, RAFVR.
- 550486 A. W. Stokes.
- 812309 R. E. Stokes, AAF.
- 547845 B. R. Stott.
- 530139 J. M. Stradling.
- 349258 J. Strange.
- 1282456 A. Stringer, RAFVR.
- 1696993 D. C. Stuchbery, RAFVR.
- 1159193 P. B. Sudbury, RAFVR.
- 572187 J. A. Sulway.
- 568178 T. R. Sumner.
- 1179667 E. J. Sweatman, RAFVR.
- 775439 O. K. Taglicht, RAFVR.
- 1602696 D. L. Tams, RAFVR.
- 1296478 F. A. R. Tarling, RAFVR.
- 545241 G. Tasker.
- 60553 E. Taylor.
- 921795 H. N. Taylor, RAFVR.
- 948969 J. Taylor, RAFVR.
- 1090432 W. A. Taylor, RAFVR.
- 1250259 R. H. Terry, RAFVR.
- 1203857 A. Thackwray, RAFVR.
- 982250 J. V. Thomas, RAFVR.
- 527150 T. W. Thomas.
- 1676721 M. H. Thomlinson, RAFVR.
- 10 53557 A. Thompson, RAFVR.
- 1654542 H. K. Thompson, RAFVR.
- 1068090 J. K. Thompson, RAFVR.
- 986871 J. W. Thompson, RAFVR.
- 1428763 R. C. Thomson, RAFVR.
- 526111 N. S. Thornburn.
- 357330 R. R. H. Thynne.
- 944112 J. Townley, RAFVR.
- 648928 R. A. Trayling.
- 1063327 P. D. Tredger, RAFVR.
- 518043 A. C. Trendall.
- 1186916 E. D. Trevenna, RAFVR.
- 50534 V. M. Trigg, RAFVR.
- 851338 W. W. Trubody, AAF.
- 953307 E. Trueman, RAFVR.
- 511566 W. J. Tyler.
- 481940 M. M. Tucker.
- 338221 A. W. Turley.
- 1824835 N. Turnbull, RAFVR.
- 370483 E. J. F. Turner.
- 1008733 H. Tyler, RAFVR.
- 1048930 P. Usher, RAFVR.
- 1442702 V. E. Valchera, RAFVR.
- 566651 W. F. Vart.
- 526695 E. H. Villa.
- 566910 R. J. Vittle.
- 1495691 J. M. Wadsworth, RAFVR.
- 1060311 N. Wainwright, RAFVR.
- 353771 S. Wakeman.
- 1048063 R. W. Waldwyn, RAFVR.
- 1168297 L. Walmsley, RAFVR.
- 1161839 R. S. Walsh, RAFVR.
- 520483 H. A. W. Walters.
- 1408297 W. H. A. Walters, RAFVR.
- 1713523 J. L Wang, RAFVR.
- 545279 C. J. R. Ward.
- 950806 W. P. Ward, RAFVR.
- 1054080 J. V. Wardell, RAFVR.
- 620722 C. F. Wasley.
- 771072 W. Watchorn, RAFVR.
- 1105312 H. C. Waterhouse, RAFVR.
- 1375575 G. T. Watson, RAFVR.
- 914296 L. Watson, RAFVR.
- 1577639 C. D. Watts, RAFVR.
- 1591662 J. A. Waugh, RAFVR.
- I197119 J. Weatherill, RAFVR.
- 1053129 F. Weaver, RAFVR.
- 1163558 W. H. Webb, RAFVR.
- 1544408 C. D. Weetman, RAFVR.
- 546634 A. S. Weller.
- 901962 G. A. Weller, RAFVR.
- 1004062 L. A. Wellings, RAFVR.
- 1007899 S. Westgate, RAFVR.
- 1304509 C. V. Westley, RAFVR.
- 535866 S. I. Westwood.
- 910899 E. F. Wheal, RAFVR.
- 1197119 C. S. Whitby, RAFVR.
- 1442953 B. White, RAFVR.
- 60729 E. White.
- 912325 H. A. White, RAFVR.
- 749927 H. J. White, RAFVR.
- 356622 J. E. White.
- 926434 T. W. White, RAFVR.
- 1436432 F. A. Whitmarsh, RAFVR.
- 1421165 K. G. Whitney, RAFVR.
- 1180306 N. T. Whitsey, RAFVR.
- 964495 R. R. Wickenden, RAFVR.
- 1182238 F. W. Wickins, RAFVR.
- 989523 S. Wiggins, RAFVR.
- 744793 E. Wilburn, RAFVR.
- 1029963 J. Wilding, RAFVR.
- 1202231 J. T. N. Wildman, RAFVR.
- 526477 J. E. Wiles.
- 634958 A. A. G. Williams.
- 619599 C. E. Williams.
- 1830460 E. O. Williams, RAFVR.
- 974991 G. Williams, RAFVR.
- 1182030 H. E. Williams, RAFVR.
- 1486153 H. L. Williams, RAFVR.
- 1008477 T. Williamson.
- 1178963 F. E. Willis, RAFVR.
- 1128665 A. Wilson, RAFVR.
- 980627 A. H. M. Wilson, RAFVR.
- 902071 A. J. Wilson, RAFVR.
- 840909 S. C. Winters, AAF.
- 1798649 T. F. Winters, RAFVR.
- 1445410 L. C. Withers, RAFVR.
- 918323 W. R. Wixey, RAFVR.
- 756245 L. G. Woodland, RAFVR.
- 980979 J. R. Woods, RAFVR.
- 1288740 C. H. Woodward, RAFVR.
- 962332 G. W. Worth, RAFVR.
- 972868 G. Wright, RAFVR.
- 760186 B. W. Wynn, RAFVR.
- 1514299 H. A. Yeo, RAFVR.
- 1266654 J. E. Zerfass, RAFVR.

Acting Sergeants

- 947248 S. A. Morris, RAFVR.
- 1511282. M. Phillips, RAFVR.
- 1193209 F. A. Savery, RAFVR.
- 1299207 F. E. Westlake, RAFVR.
- 611236 T. W. Woods.

Corporals

- 1378479 J. W. Abbey, RAFVR.
- 543740 D. W. Adam, RAFVR.
- 1275969 F. J. Adams, RAFVR.
- 1110423 W. Adams, RAFVR.
- 1187023 A. C. Agg, RAFVR.
- 1530930 B. Akers, RAFVR.
- 1045881 G. C. Akrill, RAFVR.
- 1335702 A. D. Aldridge, RAFVR.
- 950881 D. B. Allen, RAFVR.
- 1404040 H. Allen, RAFVR.
- 938161 G. E. Allkins, RAFVR.
- 120169 J. A. Andrew, RAFVR.
- 1024773 T. Andrew, RAFVR.
- 1452734 G. T. Armitage, RAFVR.
- 1801132 W. F. Armitage, RAFVR.
- 1257401 J. F. Armour, RAFVR.
- 1266302 E. C. Arnold, RAFVR.
- 747056 L. V. Arnold, RAFVR.
- 619658 J. E. Ashton.
- 1107681 J. N. Atkins.
- 1038500 H. Austin, RAFVR.
- 1223445 A. F. J. Avis, RAFVR.
- 1463790 H. C. Baker, RAFVR.
- 1146629 W. J. Bakewell, RAFVR.
- 1387382 W. J. Baldwin, RAFVR.
- 637205 G. T. Ball.
- 1261000 J. R. Ball, RAFVR.
- 918688 D. Ballard, RAFVR.
- 1179479 E. Banks, RAFVR.
- 1617684 L. A. Barnden, RAFVR.
- 1278600 J. Barnes, RAFVR.
- 1653173 F. J. Bajrrett, RAFVR.
- 1524728 G. E. Barritt, RAFVR.
- 1154772 A. E. Bartram, RAFVR.
- 1466618 S. H. Bartram, RAFVR.
- 326018 H. Basham.
- 902046 W. Batley, RAFVR.
- 1281113 R. A. Baugh, RAFVR.
- 1368012 M. W. G. Baxter, RAFVR.
- 627383 J. W. Beardsley.
- 2040403 M. A. Beattie, RAFVR.
- 1487816 T. Beattie, RAFVR.
- 1481676 S. Beaumont, RAFVR.
- 1133255 F. A. G. Belcher, RAFVR.
- 1064848 A. M. Bell, RAFVR.
- 928221 G. H. Benn, RAFVR.
- 940085 E. J. Bennett, RAFVR.
- 530621 P. N. Bennett.
- 1197355 T. Bennett, RAFVR.
- 1172733 W. F. Bennett, RAFVR.
- 956049 H. Benson, RAFVR.
- 908222 J. Bernardes, RAFVR.
- 1000628 L. Berry, RAFVR.
- 1357312 F. G. Bessant, RAFVR.
- 1132988 A. Betts, RAFVR.
- 2066520 E. C. Betts, RAFVR.
- 1129044 L. P. Bevan, RAFVR.
- 1164341 B. A. Billington, RAFVR.
- 1281227 A. R. Billins, RAFVR.
- 1483535 S. Birchenough, RAFVR.
- 1557245 J. A. Birnie.
- 1069744 G. L. Bishop, RAFVR.
- 1601070 J. P.Bishop, RAFVR.
- 1202009 H. A. Blake RAFVR.
- 1241106 A. Bleach, RAFVR.
- 855105 H. M. Blenkinsop, AAF.
- 1286245 E. H. Blinkhorn, RAFVR.
- 1215122 G. F. Bonner, RAFVR.
- 1165021 B. A. Bosworth, RAFVR.
- 1497180 G. Bottoms, RAFVR.
- 577410 C. Bowler.
- 1086801 A. Bradbury, RAFVR.
- 743170 A. G. Bradfield, RAFVR.
- 1027483 W. Bradford, RAFVR.
- 573853 R. C. T.Brant.
- 1532447 L. W. Breeze, RAFVR.
- 1255080 W. J.Brett, RAFVR.
- 1181811 F. Bridge, RAFVR.
- 1203451 H. Brock, RAFVR.
- 1371313 R. A. Brocklesby, RAFVR.
- 1435572 H. Bromley, RAFVR.
- 1230733 S. G. Brooker, RAFVR.
- 1308958 K. A. Brooks, RAFVR.
- 1566512 C. A. Broqmfield, RAFVR.
- 958016 D. Broomhead, RAFVR.
- 1018455 A. B. Brown, RAFVR.
- 1069779 A. C. Brown, RAFVR.
- 1043790 E. Brown, RAFVR.
- 1031175 E. F. Brown, RAFVR.
- 1055025 H. Brown, RAFVR.
- 1248353 R. G. Brown, RAFVR.
- 1104828 W. Brown, RAFVR.
- 977807 W. N. J. Brownlee, RAFVR.
- 1019636 F. H. Brumfitt, RAFVR.
- 1525438 V. Bryan, RAFVR.
- 1415470 R. C. Bryant, RAFVR.
- 1173803 H. J. Buck, RAFVR.
- 1012956 H. Bucher, RAFVR.
- 1249228 C. W. G. Buglear, RAFVR.
- 1480975 J. Bullock, RAFVR.
- 1534973 W. J. Burke, RAFVR.
- 1169205 H. K. Burley, RAFVR.
- 1400919 I. Burnett, RAFVR.
- 1274772 H. J. W. Burns, RAFVR.
- 2062952 D. M. Burton, RAFVR.
- 1538946 J. H. Bursell, RAFVR.
- 1612386 E. B. F. Bussey, RAFVR.
- 1058843 A. W. H. Butcher, RAFVR.
- 1015627 E. T. Butcher, RAFVR.
- 756172 W. B. Butler, RAFVR.
- 909557 W. S. R. Butler, RAFVR.
- 507388 H. Byron.
- 1543725 J. P. Byrne, RAFVR.
- 1152091 C. S. Cadd, RAFVR.
- 527995 N. E. J. Caddy.
- 1054253 J. B. Cahill, RAFVR.
- 1415905 R. W. Capron, RAFVR.
- 905634 C. W. Carriage, RAFVR.
- 1266264 A. C. Carter, RAFVR.
- 963596 C. H. Carter, RAFVR.
- 1632016 G. L. Cartlidge, RAFVR.
- 1012205 F. J. Caton, RAFVR.
- 1201613 D. Catt, RAFVR.
- 1138763 W. M. H. Challinor, RAFVR.
- 951409 C. G. Chambers, RAFVR.
- 645693 R. E. Champ.
- 638429 W. L. Channell.
- 1241116 G. H. P. Chaplin, RAFVR.
- 537037 F. Chapman.
- 1110830 G. E. Chapman, RAFVR.
- 930179 H. F. G. Chapman, RAFVR.
- 770760 J. Chapman, RAFVR.
- 1263848 S. S. Charter, RAFVR.
- 1444220 J. A. Chenery, RAFVR.
- 1272063 D. H. Child, RAFVR.
- 1008050 C. J. Clarke, RAFVR.
- 1464483 T. H. Clarke, RAFVR.
- 576679 R. J. Cleare.
- 981604 M. Clennell, RAFVR.
- 991615 E. Cliff, RAFVR.
- 1254053 F. G. Cockburn, RAFVR.
- 1426478 D. L. Coggins, RAFVR.
- 701159 W. R. Cole, RAFVR.
- 1186389 A. E. Collins, RAFVR.
- 1245435 G. H. Collins, RAFVR.
- 1353728 A. G. F. Compson, RAFVR.
- 928151 P. D. Cooke, RAFVR.
- 953725 H. F. Cookson, RAFVR.
- 1013255 E. Cooper, RAFVR.
- 1116931 G. W. Cornes, RAFVR.
- 1287589 T. W. Corrigan, RAFVR.
- 1102790 H. W. G. Cory, RAFVR.
- 914817 A. W. Coutanche, RAFVR.
- 1151941 K. F. Covill, RAFVR.
- 1098681 A. Cowap, RAFVR.
- 2202857 A. E. Cox, RAFVR.
- 1558632. P. Craig, RAFVR.
- 1254432 F. C. Grain, RAFVR.
- 938238 D. R. Crawley, RAFVR.
- 1019511 J. W. Crichton, RAFVR.
- 1204633 H. E. Crook, RAFVR.
- 1660563 A. Crossland, RAFVR.
- 1119386 R. Crossley, RAFVR.
- 1205959 C. T. Crowe, RAFVR.
- 1238744 J. W. Crouch, RAFVR.
- 1224095 W. C. Crisp, RAFVR.
- 1159639 W. F. Crump, RAFVR.
- 610909 J. Cummings.
- 1419592 C. J. H. Curtis, RAFVR.
- 1258547 F. Cutting, RAFVR.
- 1464950 L. C. Dale, RAFVR.
- 1063113 C. S. Dalton, RAFVR.
- 1552943 J. W. D'Alton, RAFVR.
- 1087250 H. J. Dance, RAFVR.
- 1100078 T. Darby, RAFVR.
- 968077 S. R. D'Arcy, RAFVR.
- 1100015 F. M. Davenport, RAFVR.
- 1115186 J. McD. Davidson, RAFVR.
- 1101562. D. Davies, RAFVR.
- 1253568 G. T. Davies, RAFVR.
  - 352579 T. D. Davies, RAFVR.
- 1164730 C. J. Davis, RAFVR.
- 1461358 S. C. Davis, RAFVR.
- 1017096 F. Davy, RAFVR.
- 941405 D. E. Dawkes, RAFVR.
- 1060723 A. Day, RAFVR.
- 1055401 A. Dean, RAFVR.
- 1269503 J. F. Delasalle, RAFVR.
- 1353977 D. J. Dellar, RAFVR.
- 941828 E. Denning, RAFVR.
- 1217582 C. J. W. Denton, RAFVR.
- 1044790 R. C. Devitt, RAFVR.
- 330450 L. A. Dexter.
- 1176792 R. D. Dickerson, RAFVR.
- 1368689 J. M. Dickie, RAFVR.
- 1263067 W. Dillon, RAFVR.
- 922780 H. Dixon, RAFVR.
- 1058102 J. R. Dixon, RAFVR.
- 1157198 P. H. Dixon, RAFVR.
- 1223097 D. S. Dobbing, RAFVR.
- 974344 A. M. P. Doig, RAFVR.
- 919047 I C. E. Doman, RAFVR.
- 554768 W. A. Donaldson, RAFVR.
- 1174126 D. F. Dorney, RAFVR.
- 916182. C. J. Draper, RAFVR.
- 1310842 W. R. E. Drewery, RAFVR.
- 1066006 K. Drury, RAFVR.
- 950125 J. C. Duerden, RAFVR.
- 1120846 J. Dunn, RAFVR.
- 1325060 S. T. Dunn, RAFVR.
- 1173685 F. E. Durrant, RAFVR.
- 902630 D. J. Eaborn, RAFVR.
- 1676870 J. F. Eadon, RAFVR.
- 1082155 E. Eaton, RAFVR.
- 990670 R. Eaves, RAFVR.
- 1274286 E. C. Edwards, RAFVR.
- 1028579 H. J. Eglin, RAFVR.
- 1311676 G. Ellaway, RAFVR.
- 1113292 W. Ellis, RAFVR.
- 631232 C. N. England.
- 1173278 P. F. C. English, RAFVR.
- 1021114 J. A. Erskine, RAFVR.
- 929413 E. G. Evans, RAFVR (deceased).
- 963782 E. M. Evans, RAFVR.
- 511828 N. A. Evans.
- 1077139 R. G. Eyres, RAFVR.
- 954072 R. Fairbairn, RAFVR.
- 925169 S. E. Faithful, RAFVR.
- 574053 R. J. Farmer.
- 932440 R. P. Farrow, RAFVR.
- 775458 K. Feiler, RAFVR.
- 1087315 J. W. Fenwick, RAFVR.
- 1078162 H. Fern, RAFVR.
- 23273 C. E. Fekrett.
- 292171 R. W. Finch.
- 701141 C. R. Fisher, RAFVR.
- 533710 A. E. J. H. Fitzgerald.
- 1132658 H. V. Flannery, RAFVR.
- 1049138 H. Flavell, RAFVR.
- 921921 J. W. Flay, RAFVR.
- 1615021 O. W. Fletcher, RAFVR.
- 926893 W. Flowers, RAFVR.
- 921300 D. P. Flynn, RAFVR.
- 915203 R. Fowler, RAFVR.
- 1316508 J. W. Foxhall, RAFVR.
- 1621656 J. Freeman, RAFVR.
- 1151898 H. R. Frosdick, RAFVR.
- 1273225 W. J. U. Frost, RAFVR.
- 1200749 H. Fryer, RAFVR.
- 1259062 O. W. Girdlestone, RAFVR.
- 1115790 A. Gledhill, RAFVR.
- 1423331 J. Goddard, RAFVR.
- 1106302 S. L. Gostling, RAFVR.
- 1127094 J. H. Gough, RAFVR.
- 997290 A. Graham, RAFVR.
- 749065 J. W. Grange, RAFVR.
- 817088 A. M. Grant, AAF.
- 1002056 J. C. Grant, RAFVR.
- 1256028 J. N. Grant, RAFVR.
- 998361 G. P. Green, RAFVR.
- 1200778 N. Green, RAFVR.
- 1118730 S. Green, RAFVR.
- 924252 B. B. Greenboam, RAFVR.
- 1417517 A. C. Greeno, RAFVR.
- 1547343 S. L. Greenwood, RAFVR.
- 1157416 R. F. Grey, RAFVR.
- 1356074 D. S. Griffiths, RAFVR.
- 1151923 R. J. Griffiths, RAFVR.
- 1187494 R. M. Griffiths, RAFVR.
- 905453 A. E. J. Grist, RAFVR.
- 1198052 H. N. W. Grosvenor, RAFVR.
- 1212668 G. W. Gurr, RAFVR.
- 990554 E. A. Hadfield, RAFVR.
- 931359 C. H. Hadley, RAFVR.
- 614846 W. Hadwin.
- 1212050 G. H. Hafter, RAFVR.
- 638291 E. Hagh.
- 935753 D. H. Halford, RAFVR.
- 1532073 H. Hall, RAFVR.
- 1353747 J. A. Hall, RAFVR.
- 1263087 L. D. Halls, RAFVR.
- 1310001 J. Halstead, RAFVR.
- 746116 A. Hamilton, RAFVR.
- 960683 D. Henderson-Hamilton, RAFVR.
- 528096 G. H. Hamilton.
- 639832 W. A. Hamilton.
- 1121246 E. Hanlon, RAFVR.
- 1174339 R. C. Hann, RAFVR.
- 927149 R. V. Harding, RAFVR.
- 1205617 W. B. Harper, RAFVR.
- 1674174 C. E. Harris, RAFVR.
- 1182093 J. Harrison, RAFVR.
- 577886 J. C. Harrison.
- 931699 J. R. Harrison, RAFVR.
- 1208649 S. A. Harrison, RAFVR.
- 1175521 T. W. Hart, RAFVR.
- 1669438 S. Harvey, RAFVR.
- 639128 R. F. Hawes.
- 1050394 C. Hawksworth, RAFVR.
- 1121982 T. L. Haycocks, RAFVR.
- 950547 B. D. Hayes, RAFVR.
- 1043464 J. G. E. Hayes, RAFVR.
- 752377 N. S. Hayes, RAFVR.
- 978214 W. R. Haynes, RAFVR.
- 1208531 W. Haystead.
- 1128134 N. Hazzlewood, RAFVR.
- 1427040 R. A. Healing, RAFVR.
- 567995 V. St. J. Heggie.
- 992363 J. Henderson, RAFVR.
- 892715 H. V. Heryet, AAF.
- 909696 L. Hewitt, RAFVR.
- 1644684 E. G. Hewlett, RAFVR.
- 1101732 C. Heyes, RAFVR.
- 948945 M. G. High, RAFVR.
- 1187472 W. W. Hiley, RAFVR.
- 1479440 D. V. Hill, RAFVR.
- 844108 A. B. Hillary, AAF.
- 1456142 L. Hitches, RAFVR.
- 888879 M. K. Hoar, AAF.
- 971658 D. A. Hodgkiss, RAFVR.
- 1052028 P. R. Hogarth, RAFVR.
- 1346206 D. Holborn, RAFVR.
- 1005232 S. D. Holdershaw, RAFVR.
- 1187825 R. J. Hopper, RAFVR.
- 909354 L. G. Horwood, RAFVR.
- 1075033 J. Houlding, RAFVR.
- 1357144 D. Howard, RAFVR.
- 622269 S. G. Howard.
- 1081954 J. Howarth, RAFVR.
- 1521210 J. M. Howat, RAFVR.
- 1355858 E. J. Howland, RAFVR.
- 1360491 H. Hubbard, RAFVR.
- 536975 J. D. Hughes.
- 981657 W. Y. Hughes, RAFVR.
- 1449586 E. J. Hunt, RAFVR.
- 1273179 R. A. Hunt, RAFVR.
- 476014 J. McL. Hunter.
- 1699873 J. S. Hunter, RAFVR.
- 1163868 W. T. L. Huntley, RAFVR.
- 1270275 C. A. Hutchcroft, RAFVR.
- 1267093 F. W. J. Hutchins, RAFVR.
- 1043830 R. V. Ingold, RAFVR.
- 855015 A. Isaac, AAF.
- 1088903 L. S. Jackman, RAFVR.
- 1093507 J. E. Jackson, RAFVR.
- 1195287 W. O. Jane, RAFVR.
- 647955 A. F. Jenkinson.
- 1127794 D, J. John, RAFVR.
- 611250 D. Johnson.
- 756574 R. K. Johnson, RAFVR.
- 1504800 T. H. Johnson, RAFVR.
- 1292189 R. P. Jonas, RAFVR.
- 543197 E. Jones.
- 620334 E. Jones.
- 1179816 G. E. Jones, RAFVR.
- 1035934 J. Jones, RAFVR.
- 1352636 R. Jones, R.A.F. Regt.
- 909947 R. M. Jones, RAFVR.
- 746682 N. A. V. Jowitt, RAFVR.
- 633281 H. Keary.
- 1072388 P. M. Keir, RAFVR.
- 1559360 G. J. Keith, RAFVR.
- 1274351 F. A. Kellaway, RAFVR.
- 1110522 F. H. Kellaway, RAFVR.
- 1539011 P. Kelly, RAFVR.
- 1044805 H. Kennewell, RAFVR.
- 1134351 G. Kenny, RAFVR.
- 1146154 J. Kent, RAFVR.
- 1384589 B. Kerr, RAFVR.
- 1554039 J. T. Kerr, RAFVR.
- 614556 R. Kewley.
- 1240595 R. J. Kiddle, RAFVR.
- 1266291 R. V. King, RAFVR.
- 2089361 G. W. Kirk, RAFVR.
- 1541661 A. Kitching, RAFVR.
- 1158711 H. C. Knight, RAFVR.
- 976364 R. F. Knight, RAFVR.
- 1262229 A. F. Lambert, RAFVR.
- 635342 L. Lanchester.
- 850146 R. M. S. Lane, AAF.
- 1171508 T. G. Lane, RAFVR.
- 904263 R. M. Lawrence, RAFVR.
- 1226295 W. H. Lawrance, RAFVR.
- 1495752 T. Laybourne, RAFVR.
- 921522 V. E. Leakey RAFVR.
- 1497809 H. Leavesley, RAFVR.
- 956271 W. H. Lee, RAF Regiment.
- 1375331 E. A. Leech, RAFVR.
- 2028888 M. G. Leech, RAFVR.
- 941927 L. Leeder, RAFVR.
- 213852 G. W. Leigh.
- 970641 M. Lerner, RAFVR.
- 985729 N. Levitt, RAFVR.
- 940372 E. Lewis, RAFVR.
- 865129 W. H. Lewis, AAF.
- 747589 L. R. Liddiard, RAFVR.
- 1119837 G. W. Liddle, RAFVR.
- 1307828 A. Light, RAFVR.
- 1477180 A. Light, RAFVR.
- 1145970 G. W. Lightfoot, RAFVR.
- 1221429 J. N. Littlemore, RAFVR.
- 1298675 H. R. Lloyd, RAFVR.
- 1654187 W. Locke, RAFVR.
- 613132 H. Lockwood.
- 1107422 C. Longbottom, RAFVR.
- 1086436 J. Longmire, RAFVR.
- 1191573 A. W. Loosemore, RAFVR.
- 1155260 J. H. K. Lord, RAFVR.
- 1083853 N. C. Louch, RAFVR.
- 987168 J. F. Lowe, RAFVR.
- 1612744 P. G. Lungley, RAFVR.
- 1176036 F. W. J. Lycett, RAFVR.
- 1023366 G. McAdam, RAFVR.
- 998124 D. D. McAllister, RAFVR.
- 940790 J. L. McCulloch, RAFVR.
- 1558132 M. McElvogue, RAFVR.
- 1123196 P. McGregor, RAFVR.
- 966504 D. McKay, RAFVR.
- 990459 R. H. McKee, RAFVR.
- 1123454 J. McKay, RAFVR.
- 1037793 T. A. McKeag, RAFVR.
- 1004583 A. Y. McKinnon, RAFVR.
- 1365028 M. McLean, RAFVR.
- 993983 N. McLeod, RAFVR.
- 1100375 J. MacPherson, RAFVR.
- 1215028 J. L. R. Mack, RAFVR.
- 1375307 H. W. Malpas, RAFVR.
- 1197141 C. Mandry, RAFVR.
- 915661 T. J. J. Mansell, RAFVR.
- 1063763 H. Markham, RAFVR.
- 905782 H. W. Marnham, RAFVR.
- 905737 E. F. Marsh, RAFVR.
- 934657 G. E. Marsh, RAFVR.
- 1120240 D. Marshall, RAFVR.
- 15425 F. L. Marshall.
- 1165534 G. E. Martin, RAFVR.
- 1295632 F. Mason.
- 933570 F. L. Masters, RAFVR.
- 974297 L. E. Mather, RAFVR.
- 771039 D. L. Matthews, RAFVR.
- 1481516 T. J. May, RAFVR.
- 1304795 E. Mears, RAFVR.
- 1660402 A. Mellor, RAFVR.
- 449222 G. A. Mends.
- 1054586 F. C. Mercer, RAFVR.
- 1198353 L. Mercer, RAFVR.
- 624475 M. Millar.
- 752606 R. F. L. Millen, RAFVR.
- 938652 R. A. Miller, RAFVR.
- 1505189 J. Mills, RAFVR.
- 1170677 L. H. D. Mills, RAFVR.
- 1204171 A. J. Milnes, RAFVR.
- 1501368 F. Mitchell, RAFVR.
- 757256 G. R. Mitchell, RAFVR.
- 928674 J. Mitchell, RAFVR.
- 1531301 J. N. Mitchell, RAFVR.
- 1195091 N. J. Mitchell, RAFVR.
- 1551933 S. Mitchell, RAFVR.
- 1467860 R. A. Mitson, RAFVR.
- 1262381 G. B. Moore, RAFVR.
- 1060441 S. Moore, RAFVR.
- 1255541 J. J. Morgan, RAFVR.
- 1064104 G. Morley, RAFVR.
- 1304570 O. F. Morris, RAFVR.
- 1351061 S. D. F. Morris, RAFVR.
- 1631594 A. E. Moseley, RAFVR.
- 747339 V. Mould, RAFVR.
- 1201025 R. W. Moulton, RAFVR.
- 634991 A. W. H. Moxon.
- 1133796 H. E. Moxon, RAFVR.
- 1618473 R. H. Muller, RAFVR.
- 1055287 J. Murray, RAFVR.
- 614469 W. H. Myers.
- 1640864 C. G. Nancarrow, RAFVR.
- 1379097 F. N. Neale, RAFVR.
- 1423683 G. P. Neilson, RAFVR.
- 1190178 B. R. Nelson, RAFVR.
- 526173 F. Newton.
- 1046199 J. R. Nicholson, RAFVR.
- 1223240 H. W. Nixon, RAFVR.
- 1060872 E. Norton, RAFVR.
- 1115536 J. E. Oakes, RAFVR.
- 752256 W. H. Oakley, RAFVR.
- 1100516 W. J. O'Connell, RAFVR.
- 1058132 F. Oddy, RAFVR.
- 1085315 J. R. Ody, RAFVR.
- 1463283 P. F. W. Offard, RAFVR.
- 1002164 J. O'Hara, RAFVR.
- 911432 F. J. Ohlson, RAFVR.
- 1527130 J. E. Oliver, RAFVR.
- 845502 H. W. Orchard, AAF.
- 924026 C. H. Ottewill, RAFVR.
- 1124171 R. W. Owen, RAFVR.
- 1095278 P. W. Padley, RAFVR.
- 975439 D. E. Page, RAFVR.
- 934612 S. Page, RAFVR.
- 1208180 W. J. Page, RAFVR.
- 1132739 H. Parkinson, RAFVR.
- 1140051 R. Parry, RAFVR.
- 1155882 C. J. W. Parsons, RAFVR.
- 485267 I. V. Passey.
- 1639186 J. O. V, Patmore, RAFVR.
- 1021786 J. Patrick, RAFVR.
- 1001737 W. A. Pawson, RAFVR.
- 1166833 L. C. A. Pearce, RAFVR.
- 1130528 D. H. H. S. Pears, RAFVR.
- 954401 T. A. Peat, RAFVR.
- 1054223 A. B. Pennington, RAFVR.
- 1493198 R. E. Pennington, RAFVR.
- 1450532 W. Perez, RAFVR.
- 1151728 P. J. Perkins, RAFVR.
- 356866 H. Perry.
- 1542580 J. Perry, RAFVR.
- 1263218 C. J. Pettit, RAFVR.
- 1465518 H. I. Petty, RAFVR.
- 520919 R. W. Philipson.
- 916311 J. A. Phillips, RAFVR.
- 1172514 A. L. Pickering, RAFVR.
- 546353 E. C. Pickett.
- 1018682 G. Pickett, RAFVR.
- 1154034 T. J. Pomfret, RAFVR.
- 551555 T. J. Pool.
- 1468345 E. Pooley, RAFVR.
- 1285387 J. S. Potter, RAFVR.
- 1161428 I. J. Powell, RAFVR.
- 1162650 F. J. J. Pressley, RAFVR.
- 1197763 T. Priddle, RAFVR.
- 971442 K. L. Pridmore, RAFVR.
- 955414 L. A. Proud, RAFVR.
- 1017605 C. Pryce, RAFVR.
- 1536379 P. Quinn, RAFVR.
- 536976 E. Quirie.
- 1084120 R. G. Ragless, RAFVR.
- 1445196 B. E. Ramsden, RAFVR.
- 1041844 W. Randall, RAFVR.
- 1234628 R. A. Ranns, RAFVR.
- 1635907 A. Rathbone, RAFVR.
- 1065790 S. Rawlings, RAFVR.
- 1710375 A. S. Reaney, RAFVR.
- 1455928 J. O. Redman, RAFVR.
- 929581 T. J. Redwood, RAFVR.
- 1536489 N. C. Reeves, RAFVR.
- 844351 V. E. Reeves, AAF.
- 1031870 H. Rennison, RAFVR.
- 966845 H. C. Renwick, RAFVR.
- 1562829 H. D. Riach, RAFVR.
- 1186750 N. Richards, RAFVR.
- 990425 J. D. Richardson, RAFVR.
- 995785 J. M. Richardson, RAFVR.
- 637817 T. W. G. Richardson.
- 1188207 H. A. Ridgeway, RAFVR.
- 1000153 C. L. Rigby, RAFVR.
- 1050450 A. Riley, RAFVR.
- 1083731 T. Riley, RAFVR.
- 1460526 T. L. Rimell, RAFVR.
- 997136 F. R. Rimes, RAFVR.
- 1056370 R. Ripley, RAFVR.
- 1004009 A. J. Ritch, RAFVR.
- 1287666 J. W. P. Roberts, RAFVR.
- 982358 H. C. Roberts, RAFVR.
- 977243 J. H. Roberts, RAFVR.
- 524378 J. Robertson.
- 944375 E. A. Robins, RAFVR.
- 943689 F. H. Robinson, RAFVR.
- 1494346 G.S. Robinson, RAFVR.
- 1101338 H. L. Robinson, RAFVR.
- 983140 J. L. Robinson, RAFVR.
- 1030049 J. Rodgers, RAFVR.
- 1048029 B. L. Rogers, RAFVR.
- 612424 D. J. Rogers.
- 905023 J. L. Rogers, RAFVR.
- 756771 A. Rqome, RAFVR.
- 1646387 D. F. H. Ross, RAFVR.
- 1427700 C. R. H. Rowe, RAFVR.
- 1222026 W. J. Rowe, RAFVR.
- 591969 W. E. Rowland.
- 1309709 R. K. Roylance, RAFVR.
- 1446724 E. V. Rudd, RAFVR.
- 1348806 A. M. Runcie, RAFVR.
- 1428147 R. G. C. Russell, RAFVR.
- 1224145 H. J. Sage, RAFVR.
- 1274117 R. J. Salway, RAFVR.
- 1531339 F. Sandeford, RAFVR.
- 1366620 S. L. E. Sangwine, RAFVR.
- 1299637 W. S. Sarah, RAFVR.
- 1190030 A. G. W. Saunders, RAFVR.
- 1092815 H. V. Sawyer, RAFVR.
- 1396749 R. J. C. Sawyer, RAFVR.
- 915047 L. A. Scheurer, RAFVR.
- 1145425 S. J. Schofield, RAFVR.
- 1463775 G. Scott, RAFVR.
- 1008301 J. Scott, RAFVR.
- 644501 V. C. G. Scott.
- 1149663 E. Seddon, RAFVR.
- 1512989 G. E. Seedhouse, RAFVR.
- 775575 K. Semenowsky, RAFVR.
- 1453542 H. A. Sessions, RAFVR.
- 1248874 S. W. Sewell, RAFVR.
- 1586362 A. S. Seymour, RAFVR.
- 1168817 N. L. Shapley, RAFVR.
- 1208408 H. R. Sharpe, RAFVR.
- 1016278 T. Sharrock, RAFVR.
- 977398 J. Shaw, RAFVR.
- 1418723 F. G. Sheppard, RAFVR.
- 885017 J. Sherman, AAF.
- 1171542 R. J. Sherwood, RAFVR.
- 1144022 J. Shipley, RAFVR.
- 1047598 T. H. N. Shipp, RAFVR.
- 1512736 R. Sidebotham, RAFVR.
- 1413595 F. W. Silk, RAFVR.
- 1674742 A. D. Simmonds, RAFVR.
- 1079773 F. C. Simmonds, RAFVR.
- 1282177 S. G. Simmons, RAFVR.
- 747024 E. G. Simpson, RAFVR.
- 1047562 R. Simpson, RAFVR.
- 1186894 R. H. Sims, RAFVR.
- 1368273 J. T. Sinclair, RAFVR.
- 1004295 G. Skelland, RAFVR.
- 1092403 C. J. Skipper, RAFVR.
- 998534 V. Slater, RAFVR.
- 1008410 B. K. Smalley, RAFVR.
- 1163613 A. Smith, RAFVR.
- 807205 A. Smith, AAF.
- 1063078 A. Smith, RAFVR.
- 1484461 C. Smith, RAFVR.
- 1014882 F. C. Smith, RAFVR.
- 976808 E. Y. Smith, RAFVR.
- 925790 H. E. Smith, RAFVR.
- 908102 R. A. F. Smith, RAFVR.
- 539349 T. Smith.
- 1052959 T. A. Smith, RAFVR.
- 1012464 W. Smith, RAFVR.
- 987773 N. Smurden, RAFVR.
- 702463 R. F. Smurden, RAFVR.
- 629965 J. H. H. Snowden.
- 1201115 E. R. Speake, RAFVR.
- 815199 B. Spencer, AAF.
- 1086389 W. G. Spencer, RAFVR.
- 1237939 H. W. J. Spittle, RAFVR.
- 1143420 T. Sproats, RAFVR.
- 1114626 G. Stafford, RAFVR.
- 1489104 J. Stansfield, RAFVR.
- 1530837 E. Statter, RAFVR.
- 1795698 G. Steedman, RAFVR.
- 950817 H. Stephenson, RAFVR.
- 1103614 H. M. Stevens, RAFVR.
- 982364 K. E. Stevenson, RAFVR.
- 1195016 M. C. Stirk, RAFVR.
- 1029358 E. Stock, RAFVR.
- 1523356 F. T. Stocker, RAFVR.
- 994007 T. M. Stocksley, RAFVR.
- 1617823 R. A. Stockwell, RAFVR.
- 1160221 W. G. Stokes, RAFVR.
- 1096077 J. G. Stonehouse, RAFVR.
- 949056 T. F. Stonton, RAFVR.
- 1370554 J. W. L. Stopani, RAFVR.
- 1462618 R. C. T. Strange, RAFVR.
- 1442608 J. Strong, RAFVR.
- 253329 R. J. Strudwick, RAFVR.
- 1501871 J. E. Styche, RAFVR.
- 1462892 V. J. Stygall, RAFVR.
- 1131316 P. G. Sudbury, RAFVR.
- 1497535 E. Suggitt, RAFVR.
- 1194287 L. Sutcliffe, RAFVR.
- 1158038 R. L. Swann, RAFVR.
- 1216677 R. N. Swinchatt, RAFVR.
- 1143241 N. B. Sykes, RAFVR.
- 1027542 N. Symm, RAFVR.
- 1223377 A. A. Taylor, RAFVR.
- 1467331 E. Taylor, RAFVR.
- 1429703 H. S. Taylor, RAFVR.
- 1204662 L. Taylor, RAFVR.
- 1143459, L. Taylor, RAFVR.
- 750702 G. R. Teagoe, RAFVR.
- 1203956 S. T. Tegg, RAFVR.
- 1100627 A. J. Tetlow, RAFVR.
- 1361481 A. Y. Thom, RAFVR.
- 1067901 B. H. Thomas, RAFVR.
- 1019455 D. Thomas, RAFVR.
- 1404457 I. J. Thomas, RAFVR.
- 614697 M. J. Thomas.
- 1296835 W. H. Thomas, RAFVR.
- 592054 E. Thompson.
- 999048 J. L. Thompson, RAFVR.
- 1085038 V. M. Thompson, RAFVR.
- 1167279 G. W. Thomson, RAFVR.
- 1123095 J. W. Thomson, RAFVR.
- 1262550 R. Thorne, RAFVR.
- 1508379 F. W. Thornton, RAFVR.
- 1692591 L. R. Thornton, RAFVR.
- 813228 I. R. Tillett, RAFVR.
- 1115936 G. Timson, RAFVR.
- 1073991 L.Tingay, RAFVR.
- 1030169 E. Titman, RAFVR.
- 2061560 O. M. Tomalin, RAFVR.
- 1100441 D. Tolmie, RAFVR.
- 1224754 E. G. Torpey, RAFVR.
- 1057398 W. Tranter, RAFVR.
- 1611800 C. Tree, RAFVR.
- 1121199 H. Turner, RAFVR.
- 901366 K. R. Tyndall, RAFVR.
- 870975 G. Usher, RAFVR.
- 1159346 F. W. Utteridge, RAFVR.
- 1033910 R. Utting, RAFVR.
- 1018878 E. Vaughan, RAFVR.
- 1676707 W. Vaughan, RAFVR.
- 1194957 K. J. Verney, RAFVR.
- 1185257 D. B. Vicars, RAFVR.
- 1138769 J. Vose, RAFVR.
- 1719982 F. V. Wagner, RAFVR.
- 1441257 D. F. Walker, RAFVR.
- 931180 H. L. Walker, RAFVR.
- 1207264 I. V. Walker, RAFVR.
- 1465370 J. A. H. Walker, RAFVR.
- 748489 T. M. Walker, RAFVR.
- 1374548 J. Wallace, RAFVR.
- 1225344 A. G. Waller, RAFVR.
- 892733 R. K. Wallis.
- 1302480 J. R. Walls, RAFVR.
- 1475716 E. D. Walmsley, RAFVR.
- 1086872 G. A. Weatherell, RAFVR.
- 925769 C. B. Webb, RAFVR.
- 952484 G. G. Webster, RAFVR.
- 1357680 R. Webster, RAFVR.
- 1189873 N. J. Weekes, RAFVR.
- 1077814 R. Welch, RAFVR.
- 1377635 T. B. Welford, RAFVR.
- 536222 W. W. H. Wellcome.
- 1378521 R. L. Wells, RAFVR.
- 750761 C. J. F. Whaley, RAFVR.
- 1152090 C. W. Wheeler, RAFVR.
- 1175466 J. Whitaker, RAFVR.
- 1165752 A. E. G. White, RAFVR.
- 462609 M. White.
- 1645390 R. White, RAFVR.
- 1117906 W. Whitehead, RAFVR.
- 1506428 A. F. Whitfield, RAFVR.
- 1150626 F. S. Whittle, RAFVR.
- 1220700 W. Whorwood, RAFVR.
- 940570 A. E. Wilday, RAFVR.
- 1156022 R. J. Wilde, RAFVR.
- 1357028 E. W. Wilkinson, RAFVR.
- 1051153 F. Wilkinson, RAFVR.
- 981855 T. W. Wilkinson, RAFVR.
- 1001227 K. Willacy, RAFVR.
- 1489904 W. Willan, RAFVR.
- 1067569 A. H. L. Williams, RAFVR.
- 1508295 C. Williams, RAFVR.
- 1204198 E. Williams, RAFVR.
- 1576221 G. Williams, RAFVR.
- 939379 H. A. Williams, RAFVR.
- 1267518 H. L. Williams, RAFVR.
- 1402562 I. Williams, RAFVR.
- 1655653 J, A. Williams, RAFVR.
- 1169596 L. W. Williams, RAFVR.
- 980918 S. B. H. Williams, RAFVR.
- 1102461 W. Williams, RAFVR.
- 1266540 H. A. Willis, RAFVR.
- 1039451 A. A. Wilson, RAFVR.
- 1127833 J. Wilson, RAFVR.
- 939577 M. Wilson, RAFVR.
- 808377 M. Wilson, AAF.
- 743424 W. Wilson, RAFVR.
- 1124959 W. Wilson, RAFVR.
- 917663 W. Wilson, RAFVR.
- 1009995 W. J. Wilson, RAFVR.
- 1427236 W. Wingfield, RAFVR.
- 1502048 A. Winnett, RAFVR.
- 1485093 W. Wolfenden, RAFVR.
- 756791 K. D. Wolsey, RAFVR.
- 1041144 M. Wood, RAFVR.
- 1129262 B. Woodbridge, RAFVR.
- 971836 C. S. Woodcock, RAFVR.
- 643774 T. Wormald.
- 1105275 F. C. Wright, RAFVR.
- 1116825 T. R. Yallop, RAFVR.
- 973656 W. S. Young, RAFVR.
- 1250286 G. A. Youngs, RAFVR.

Acting Corporals

- 1004086 I. Bielby, RAFVR.
- 1377894 L. C. Byles, RAFVR.
- 1429168 E. L. Dallman, RAFVR.
- 1158013 H. L. Fisher, RAFVR.
- 1619097 C. Hurcum, RAFVR.
- 1378342 S. C. Jerrard, RAFVR.
- 1176186 S. Johnson, RAFVR.
- 1496863 A. C. Money, RAFVR.
- 1408325 I. J. Owen, RAFVR.
- 1090236 R. J. Pratt, RAFVR.
- 1040799 J. W. Robinson, RAFVR.
- 1123796 J. Slee, RAFVR.
- 1564105 L. A. Wade, RAFVR.

Leading Aircraftmen

- 1297881 A. Allen, RAFVR.
- 1225829 F. H. Allen, RAFVR.
- 1682726 G. E. Ambrose, RAFVR.
- 986720 R. Anderson, RAFVR.
- 1435335 H. S. Andrews, RAFVR.
- 992236 A. L. Appleby, RAFVR.
- 1008866 F. Ashworth, RAFVR.
- 1852822 C. F. M. Attiwell, RAFVR.
- J 504390 K. Avison, RAFVR.
- 1631321 G. E. Aylett, RAFVR.
- 1171543 A. R. C. Baker, RAFVR.
- 1027371 G. E. Baker, RAFVR.
- 1412706 S. Baker, RAFVR.
- 1010274 H. Ball, RAFVR.
- 1677013 R. Ball, RAFVR.
- 1148094 W. J. Balmer, RAFVR.
- 1621990 G. Barlow, RAFVR.
- 1663295 L. R. Barlow, RAFVR.
- 1012076 C. E. Barnes, RAFVR.
- 1308826 C. H. Barrett, RAFVR.
- 1143615 J. Bartlett, RAFVR.
- 975937 A. E. Baxendale, RAFVR.
- 921927 J. Beare, RAFVR.
- 1529552 F. Beaumont, RAFVR.
- 1498265 W. F. Bedell, RAFVR.
- 1161271 H. W. Bedwell, RAFVR.
- 857562 H. G. Belch, AAF.
- 1696416 W. D. Bellamy, RAFVR.
- 1644092 A. W. Benee, RAFVR.
- 1696606 J. Bennett, RAFVR.
- 1137620 L. V. Bennett, RAFVR.
- 1492714 T. Benson, RAFVR.
- 927446 E. T. Betts, RAFVR.
- 1427186 G. D. Bicknell, RAFVR.
- 1320138 V. E. Birch, RAFVR.
- 1155198 R. Birchall, RAFVR.
- 1560068 G. Bishop, RAF Regiment.
- 1099710 H. W. Bishop, RAFVR.
- 1397473 I H. A. Blowers, RAFVR.
- 393132 S. Blundell, RAFVR.
- 1414019 J. W. N. Blythe, RAFVR.
- 926715 C. C. Bone, RAFVR.
- 1295804 L. G. Booler, RAFVR.
- 1308991 R. H. F. Bouch, RAFVR.
- 1491039 W. F. Boulton, RAFVR.
- 1014626 E. R. Bowker, RAFVR.
- 1777575 R. F. Bowles, RAFVR.
- 1240229 P. W. Box, RAFVR.
- 1042716 J. Bradley, RAFVR.
- 1520726 K. Bradley, RAFVR.
- 1092484 R. H. Breeze, RAFVR.
- 1056678 N. Brittain, RAFVR.
- 920197 J. N. Brower, RAFVR.
- 1308191 F. Brown, RAFVR.
- 1785273 T. B. Brown. RAFVR.
- 1378461 W. R. Brown, RAFVR.
- 642331 C. C. Buckley.
- 1878709 E. J. Bunn, RAFVR.
- 1186804 W. G. Burch, RAFVR.
- 980666 A. T. H. Burgess, RAFVR.
- 846247 W. A. Burgess, AAF.
- 1184074 A. E. Burns, RAFVR.
- 1344276 W. Butters, RAFVR.
- 1325735 J. E. Butterworth, RAFVR.
- 1485973 C. Bycroft, RAFVR.
- 1370797 J. Byers, RAFVR.
- 1464732 C. E. Byrne, RAFVR.
- 1495101 W. H. Cain, RAFVR.
- 1663788 A. J. Carey, RAFVR.
- 1275929 J. Carpenter, RAFVR.
- 1648065 J. W. Carter, RAFVR.
- 1047821 T. H. Cave, RAFVR.
- 1830157 J. H. Cawsey, RAFVR.
- 1348758 W. Chaffe, RAFVR.
- 1423322 E. Chapman, RAFVR.
- 1308571 E. G. Chilton, RAFVR.
- 1386683 S. G. Chinery, RAFVR.
- 1650230 F. W. Chinnery, RAFVR.
- 1869059 W. A. Chittenden, RAFVR.
- 1436701 G. C. Chivers, RAFVR.
- 1019398 S. McA. Christie, RAFVR.
- 1240078 P. J. T. Church, RAFVR.
- 1423418 W. J. T. Church, RAFVR.
- 1041513 G. E. Clague, RAFVR.
- 2201193 J. A. Clague, RAFVR.
- 1158885 A. E. Cleverly, RAFVR.
- 1308627 A. H. Clode, RAFVR.
- 1226338 F. P. Clokkou, RAFVR.
- 1190471 P. J. Clough, RAFVR.
- 1200428 W. W. Coburn, RAFVR.
- 1071742 J. H. Cockburn, RAFVR.
- 1215179 E. C. Coleman, RAFVR.
- 1662510 K. H. Coleman, RAFVR.
- 1172921 N. H. Coleman, RAFVR.
- 1643136 J. H. Haskin-Coles, RAFVR.
- 1294671 E. J. A. Collett, RAFVR.
- 907771 F. A. Collins, RAFVR.
- 863543 J. J. G. A. Compton, AAF.
- 523257 J. F. Cook, RAFVR.
- 1469133 G. A. Cooke, RAFVR.
- 1377144 R. Cooke, RAFVR.
- 3011756 H. Cooper, RAFVR.
- 1088777 P. H. Cooper, RAFVR.
- 1247572 P. J. W. Cooper, RAFVR.
- 1056022 F. J. Cothan, RAFVR.
- 1121444 H. Couzens, RAFVR.
- 1408263 G. H. P. Cox, RAFVR.
- 1096236 J. Cox, RAFVR.
- 1381422 K. E. Cox, RAFVR.
- 1474061 W. C. Cox, RAFVR.
- 17111773 G. E. Cradock, RAFVR.
- 1064566 E. Craig, RAFVR.
- 1237299 H. J. A. Crisp, RAFVR.
- 1180615 B. C. Cross, RAFVR.
- 1470637 R. W. M. Cross, RAFVR.
- 1514038 J. S. Cunningham, RAFVR.
- 1461292 E. N. Dand, RAFVR.
- 1644927 D. E. Daniels, RAFVR.
- 1669583 B. F. Darby, RAFVR.
- 1692249 E. Darling, RAFVR.
- 1240091 E. W. J. Darlow, RAFVR.
- 536724 D. G. Davies.
- 1438351 H. Davies, RAFVR.
- 1352375 N. W. Davies, RAFVR.
- 1358888 R. W. J. Davies, RAFVR.
- 1067045 T. Davies, RAFVR.
- 1450952 R. C. Davis, RAFVR.
- 1497190 W. Davis, RAFVR.
- 978197 W. G. Davis, RAFVR.
- 1477701 D. B. Dawson, RAFVR.
- 1575440 F. Dawson, RAFVR.
- 1632414 L. R. Deakin, RAFVR.
- 1650227 G. C. Deane, RAFVR.
- 1673983 A. Dearden, RAFVR.
- 1717567 L. Dennis, RAFVR.
- 1620993 R. V. Desombre, RAFVR.
- 1092430 R. Devine, RAFVR.
- 1420287 E. N. Diels, RAFVR.
- 1246739 J. Diggens, RAFVR.
- 1135927 A. Kirkin, RAFVR.
- 1201956 C. F. Dolton, RAFVR.
- 1540138 S. Douglas, RAFVR.
- 1468555 J. V. C. Doyle, RAFVR.
- 1874297 E. E. G. Duck, RAFVR.
- 1657177 S. C. A. Dudley, RAFVR.
- 1689732 D. C. Duncan, RAFVR.
- 1065180 B. P. Dunne, RAFVR.
- 1671780 D. Eagle, RAFVR.
- 1550424 F. Edington, RAFVR.
- 1659192 C. Edwards, RAFVR.
- 1666805 C. G. Edwards, RAFVR.
- 1236760 J. A. Ellwood, RAFVR.
- 744203 W. G. Ellis, RAFVR.
- 1309194 A. S. England, RAFVR.
- 1468750 G. England, RAFVR.
- 051307 D. G. Evans, RAFVR.
- 1166837 R. J. Evans, RAFVR.
- 1870381 G. E. S. Everill, RAFVR.
- 1645886 F. A. Ewin, RAFVR.
- 1340475 W. G. Fanning, RAFVR.
- 1645933 R. H. Farley, RAFVR.
- 961175 W. D. Feasey, RAFVR.
- 1516192 H. Feather, RAFVR.
- 1096583 P. H. Felton, RAFVR.
- 1455578 F. H. Fenn, RAFVR.
- 1555153 G. M. Ferguson, RAFVR.
- 1246271 E. R. Few, RAFVR.
- 1429288 S. C. Field, RAFVR.
- 996050 H. E. Finch, RAFVR.
- 1617766 C. R. G. Finnis, RAFVR.
- 1066973 G. J. Fisher, RAFVR.
- 1012783 S. Fletcher, RAFVR.
- 1031132 A. Flood, RAFVR.
- 1726863 E. Flynn, RAFVR.
- 1127282 E. Ford, RAFVR.
- 1528531 N. H. Foreman, RAFVR.
- 1491960 A. Foster, RAFVR.
- 1547876 G. G. Fowler, RAFVR.
- 1619600 J. Fowler, RAFVR.
- 1068088 H. Fox, RAFVR.
- 1528730 J. Fox, RAFVR.
- 1417477 C. Francis, RAFVR.
- 1058554 K. G. Galloway, RAFVR.
- 1356995 J. Ganley, RAFVR.
- 1680473 F. Garlick, RAFVR.
- 1532129 J. E. Gaynor, RAFVR.
- 1447721 W. W. George, RAFVR.
- 1310313 A. J. Gilbert, RAFVR.
- 1178528 H. S. Gilderthorpe, RAFVR.
- 1070277 A. R. Gill, RAFVR.
- 635002 W. F. Godfrey.
- 1194313 C. L. Goff, RAFVR.
- 1640028 J. T. Gooch, RAFVR.
- 947901 A. Gordon, RAFVR.
- 1025710 J. Gordon, RAFVR.
- 1711705 J. Gower, RAFVR.
- 1079527 R. E. Cowing, RAFVR.
- 1561958 P. Graham, RAFVR.
- 1008344 R. Grantham, RAFVR.
- 1485050 N. A. Graves, RAFVR.
- 1698656 H. Green, RAFVR.
- 967588 L. M. Gregory, RAFVR.
- 1542663 W. R. Gregory, RAFVR.
- 1285647 H. D. Grimmer, RAFVR.
- 1088464 C. F. E. Grinham, RAFVR.
- 2208411 H. V. Groom, RAFVR.
- 1311734 J. O. Groves, RAFVR.
- 1510666 R. Grubb, RAFVR.
- 1830813 R. D. Guthrie, RAFVR.
- 1641960 W. N. Hackney, RAFVR.
- 1501278 S. Hadfield, RAFVR.
- 1139140 H. Haines, RAFVR.
- 964762 F. J. Hales, RAFVR.
- 1585844 K. G. Halfhide, RAFVR.
- 1371236 J. Hall, RAFVR.
- 1548906 J. W. Hall, RAFVR.
- 2202938 G. Hammond, RAFVR.
- 359772 A. Harbottle.
- 1660589 W. H. Harden, RAFVR.
- 2215248 J. Hardman, RAFVR.
- 1697167 C. P. Hare, RAFVR.
- 1487185 A. L. Hargreaves, RAFVR.
- 1035593 W. Hargreaves, RAFVR.
- 1666310 E. G. Harris, RAFVR.
- 1667911 F. H. Harris, RAFVR.
- 1158858 P. C. Harris, RAFVR.
- 1078386 C. H. A. Harrison, RAFVR.
- 1644388 F, Hart, RAFVR.
- 964869 G. Hartshorn, RAFVR.
- 996680 F. Hawcroft, RAFVR.
- 1280599 E. G. Hayes, RAFVR.
- 1870252 E. Healey, RAFVR.
- 1139701 R. W. Heppenstall, RAFVR.
- 998574 F. Hewitt, RAFVR.
- 1236022 E. J. Heywood, RAFVR.
- 1396388 R. D. Hillyer, RAFVR.
- 1466779 W. G. Hinton, RAFVR.
- 1171324 W. M. Hodge, RAFVR.
- 1078659 K. Hodgson, RAFVR.
- 993359 J. N. McP. Hogg, RAF Regiment.
- 952510 F. L. Holden, RAFVR.
- 1158446 J. E. Holdsworth, RAFVR.
- 1506596 H. Holford, RAFVR.
- 1084683 J. Hope, RAFVR.
- 849206 W. S. A. Horobin, AAF.
- 1872684 A. E. Houghton, RAFVR.
- 1079165 L. S. Howard, RAFVR.
- 810193 J. Howell, AAF.
- 1640223 D. C. Hudson, RAFVR.
- 1208865 W. Hudson, RAFVR.
- 1796137 M. J. Hughes, RAFVR.
- 1771172 L. Hurford, RAFVR.
- 1527379 W. Hurst, RAFVR.
- 1345327 P. Husband, RAFVR.
- 1342813 A. Hutchinson, RAFVR.
- 1067632 A. Hutton, RAFVR.
- 981393 W. B. Hynd, RAFVR.
- 646361 R. Irving.
- 1421302 C. F. Jackson, RAFVR.
- 633616 N. James.
- 1092662 S. James, RAFVR.
- 1068698 I. W. L. Jefferson, RAFVR.
- 455091 C. L. Jenden, RAFVR.
- 1011423 K. W. Jenkins, RAFVR.
- 1487214 G. A. Jensen, RAFVR.
- 1115069 F. Johnson, RAFVR.
- 1410381 H. W. Johnson, RAFVR.
- 1408692 P. J. Johnson, RAFVR.
- 1230740 A. Jones, RAFVR.
- 1200363 D. H. T. Jones, RAFVR.
- 1304823 E. A. Jones, RAFVR.
- 1657408 H. L. Jones, RAFVR.
- 1189218 L. Jones, RAFVR.
- 1300544 T. A. H. Jones, RAFVR.
- 775822 S. H. Kassis, RAFVR.
- 746411 G. F. Keating, RAFVR.
- 1410299 J. Keegan, RAFVR.
- 1555180 A. Keegans, RAFVR.
- 1202057 L. G. Kerry, RAFVR.
- 1149177 J. Kidd, RAFVR.
- 1560842 H. C. King, RAFVR.
- 1154808 W. King, RAFVR.
- 1660426 H. Kirby, RAFVR.
- 980682 W. H. Kirby, RAFVR.
- 1008803 C. Kondrat, RAFVR.
- 1039794 R. C. Lamb, RAFVR.
- 1189336 J. B. Langham, RAFVR.
- 1137895 T. L. Lashbrook, RAFVR.
- 1055867 J. W. Laycock, RAFVR.
- 1465896 A. C. Leah, RAFVR.
- 1242058 L. A. Leakey, RAFVR.
- 1070476 G. Legge, RAFVR.
- 1250833 L. L. Legon, RAFVR.
- 1091807 J. Leonard, RAFVR.
- 648387 C. F. Lewis.
- 1501244 E. G. Lewis, RAFVR.
- 1631683 P. J. Lewis, RAFVR.
- 1463247 G. E. Lidlow, RAFVR.
- 1378015 E. W. Long, RAFVR.
- 1179112 A. Lowe, RAFVR.
- 1227834 G. W. Luffman, RAFVR.
- 1533019 L. G. Lush, RAFVR.
- 1370088 F. McAleese, RAFVR.
- 1513121 E. McCartney, RAFVR.
- 1385215 D. J. McGeary, RAFVR.
- 1371980 J. McGhee, RAFVR.
- 1499005 J. L. McGrath, RAFVR.
- 980611 J. Mackay, RAFVR.
- 2207668 G. Mackenzie, RAFVR.
- 1093618 J. F. McKevitt, RAFVR.
- 1571650 A. R. Macmillan, RAFVR.
- 1274013 J. H. G. McMillan, RAFVR.
- 1346755 R. MacSwan, RAFVR.
- 1667536 D. H. Maloney, RAFVR.
- 1189268 G. H. Mann, RAFVR.
- 1647277 A. C. Mansell, RAFVR.
- 1367232 I A. Marshall, RAFVR.
- 293535 A. C. Martin, RAFVR.
- 1249511 H. Martin, RAFVR.
- 1345337 A. Mathieson, RAFVR.
- 1337636 D. A. E. Mauser, RAFVR.
- 1637972 A. C. Mead, RAFVR.
- 1105971 M. Mead, RAFVR.
- 1170065 F. H. Meaddows, RAFVR.
- 643260 D. W. Meaton.
- 1286089 D. W. Medgett, RAFVR.
- 647172 I F. Medhurst.
- 571938 G. D. Meldrum, RAFVR.
- 1289439 C. H. Melhuish, RAFVR.
- 1303841 C. Mercer, RAFVR.
- 1242006 E. W. Middleton, RAFVR.
- 1694528 W. Middleton, RAFVR.
- 1445451 T. D. Miles, RAFVR.
- 1201058 G. E. Milgate, RAFVR.
- 1683747 D. Moore, RAFVR.
- 15636711 L. E. Moore, RAFVR.
- 1537540 F. W. Moores, RAFVR.
- 744210 C. J. Moorhouse, RAFVR.
- 1111240 T. Morgan, RAFVR.
- 1660599 V. A. H. Moring, RAFVR.
- 1656567 E. Morris, RAFVR.
- 1051725 H. Morrison, RAFVR.
- 1299623 E. F. Morton, RAFVR.
- 1643514 J. H. Morton, RAFVR.
- 574585 J. L. Moyle.
- 1225146 M. J. Murray, RAFVR.
- 1214812 K. A. Neale, RAFVR.
- 1651649 F. J. Newman, RAFVR.
- 1255140 D. R. Nicholas, RAFVR.
- 1141032 J. V. Nichols, RAFVR.
- 1042774 E. Nightingale, RAFVR.
- 1902990 J. P. Nixon, RAFVR.
- 1611671 E. H. Nokes, RAFVR.
- 1271180 B. J. Orman, RAFVR.
- 1489625 T. L. Nuttall, RAFVR.
- 1074640 M. J. O'Brien, RAFVR.
- 1613042 W. C. Ogden, RAFVR.
- 1668616 C. G. Osmond, RAFVR.
- 1523604 R. W. Owen, RAFVR.
- 1430953 L. W. Packham, RAFVR.
- 1449587 W. A. F. Page, RAFVR.
- 1481739 A. Palmer, RAFVR.
- 1516099 A. Parker, RAFVR.
- 1471479 B. J. Parsons, RAFVR.
- 1070585 R. A. Pashley, RAFVR.
- 1517983 F. Patrick, RAFVR.
- 1435627 R. W. Payne, RAFVR.
- 1166982 F. Peacock, RAFVR.
- 1149316 F. Pead, RAFVR.
- 1450738 C. J. E. Pearce, RAFVR.
- 626455 K. T. P. Pearce.
- 645177 F. Pearson.
- 1197125 J. W. Peck, RAFVR.
- 1114437 H. Perrin, RAFVR.
- 1458493 S. W. Perrin, RAFVR.
- 1482137 T. J. Perry, RAFVR.
- 1514799 G. Peters, RAFVR.
- 1365152 R. Petrie, RAFVR.
- 1189619 N. O. Philpot, RAFVR.
- 1526804 L. Pickup, RAFVR.
- 1220840 G. H. Piears, RAFVR.
- 911884 H. M. Pinnock, RAFVR.
- 1024657 L. A. C. Plumb, RAFVR.
- 1542977 G. E. Pollard, RAFVR.
- 1237609 N. D. Poole, RAFVR.
- 1214304 E. S. Powell, RAFVR.
- 1008973 H. Pratt, RAFVR.
- 1710352 H. T. Prestwich, RAFVR.
- 1649797 F. Priestley, RAFVR.
- 577814 D. H. Pring.
- 1421563 G. C. Pryor, RAFVR.
- 1040158 F. W. Pullan, RAFVR.
- 1106749 J. Pullar, RAFVR.
- 1154206 J. A. Pullen, RAFVR.
- 1433308 T. H. Quantrill, RAFVR.
- 1263355 L. Quick, RAFVR.
- 981003 G. C. Raeside, RAFVR.
- 1385310 H. Ragan, RAFVR.
- 991456 S. J. Raisey, RAFVR.
- 1616680 A. R. Read, RAFVR.
- 1463306 J. R. Read, RAFVR.
- 841177 W. F. J. Reed, RAFVR.
- 1366815 R. P. Reid, RAFVR.
- 1326164 G. K. Revill, RAFVR.
- 1050696 H. Reynolds, RAFVR.
- 1181794 J. S. Reynolds, RAFVR.
- 1419979 P. E. Richards, RAFVR.
- 1547993 E. V. Riches, RAFVR.
- 1334256 C. H. G. Ridgers, RAFVR.
- 533757 F. Rimmer.
- 1687595 F. O. Roberts, RAFVR.
- 1128596 N. Robinson, RAFVR.
- 915673 E. H. Rogers, RAFVR.
- 1675017 J. Rogers, RAFVR.
- 354364 G. W. Rose.
- 1393957 N. C. Rouse, RAFVR.
- 507313 D. McDermott-Row, RAFVR.
- 928188 H. F. Rowlands, RAFVR.
- 1434414 A. F. Rowley, RAFVR.
- 1091651 L. Rushworth, RAFVR.
- 1641251 H. F. E. Russell, RAFVR.
- 1667423 J. Russell, RAFVR.
- 778232 L. J. C. Salter, RAFVR.
- 1102821 J. Samuel, RAFVR.
- 1061375 T. D. Scott, RAFVR.
- 1477303 A. Seaton, RAFVR.
- 1038468 C. C. Shakespeare, RAFVR.
- 1526943 C. C. Shasby, RAFVR.
- 1864477 E. Shaw, RAFVR.
- 1149397 H. Shaw, RAFVR.
- 1648302 T. H. Shearer, RAFVR.
- 1644376 W. E. Sheldon, RAFVR.
- 1024647 W. Shepherd, RAFVR.
- 1108028 D. M. Shirlow, RAFVR.
- 1694311 O. Shufflebottom, RAFVR.
- 1070935 D. T. Simmons, RAFVR.
- 1259728 R. Simpson, RAFVR.
- 1076069 A. J. Sims, RAFVR.
- 1830266 J. B. Skuse, RAFVR.
- 1349453 A. Smith, RAFVR.
- 1100252 C. B. Smith, RAFVR.
- 1045874 D. Smith, RAFVR.
- 1547277 E. F. Smith, RAFVR.
- 1321853 E. G. Smith, RAFVR.
- 1291933 F. Smith, RAFVR.
- 1578652 G. Smith, RAFVR.
- 1236501 L. T. Smith, RAFVR.
- 1782123 O. Smith, RAFVR.
- 1614992 W. M. B. Smith, RAFVR.
- 1201173 C. E. Sorrell, RAFVR.
- 1643658 R. L. G. Spraggons, RAFVR.
- 1444337 T. C. Spurgeon, RAFVR.
- 1638921 E. J. Spurr, RAFVR.
- 1527205 A. Stancliffe, RAFVR.
- 611032 H. Standing.
- 1405270. W. E. Staeleton, RAFVR.
- 1525295 S. Starling RAFVR.
- 1017057 H. J. Steege, RAFVR.
- 989008 F. Steele, RAFVR.
- 1034589 G. B. Steele, RAFVR.
- 959127 C. E. Stevens, RAFVR.
- 1412776 P. Stevens, RAFVR.
- 1785391 A. H. Stewart, RAFVR.
- 1502324 J. A. Stoddard, RAFVR.
- 1248927 C. S. Stokes, RAFVR.
- 1693560 J. Stuart, RAFVR.
- 1406707 N. Sutton, RAFVR.
- 1133589 A. E. Sykes, RAFVR.
- 1419294 H. F. Symes, RAFVR.
- 1619563 S. J. Symonds, RAFVR.
- 1650432 T. H. Tacchi, RAFVR.
- 1297996 E. J. Taylor, RAFVR.
- 1870703 W. F. Taylor, RAFVR.
- 1668751 C. S. Thomas, RAFVR.
- 1708159 D. A. Thomas, RAFVR.
- 1663156 C. E. Thompson, RAFVR.
- 962395 W. J. Thompson, RAFVR.
- 985861 L. Timlin, RAFVR.
- 941539 C. Tinker, RAFVR.
- 1878042 H. Titter, RAFVR.
- 1083001 H. W. G. Tomlin, RAFVR.
- 1738643 A. J. Tongue, RAFVR.
- 908358 A. W. Tooke, RAFVR.
- 1340879 J. S. Torrie, RAFVR.
- 1278203 W. C. Tracey, RAFVR.
- 1172242 C. R. Trevenna, RAFVR.
- 1376818 G. Tullis, RAFVR.
- 1377078 T. J. Turner, RAFVR.
- 1860255 A. J. Turrell, RAFVR.
- 1109316 F. W. Uttley, RAFVR.
- 1261164 C. A. Valente, RAFVR.
- 1693007 A. A. Vanwell, RAFVR.
- 1284221 H. G. Vickery, RAFVR.
- 1229703 J. W. Vigus, RAFVR.
- 1437072 A. J. Vince, RAFVR.
- 1160515 R. G. Vines, RAFVR.
- 1085685 E. C. Wabrurton, RAFVR.
- 1117381 F. N. Wade, RAFVR.
- 1188812 L. R. Wakeford, RAFVR.
- 1686505 R. C. Walton, RAFVR.
- 915207 W. J. Wardle, RAFVR.
- 1200585 J. C. Ware, RAFVR.
- 1533153 H. W. L. Warner, RAFVR.
- 1237035 F. R. Waters, RAFVR.
- 1116295 L. Watts, RAFVR.
- 920783 M. C. Weaver, RAFVR.
- 1659575 G. H. Webb, RAFVR.
- 1118171 J. Webster, RAFVR.
- 979160 J. L. Wheeler, RAFVR.
- 1269317 T. A. Whitaker, RAFVR.
  - 302593 J. Whiston, RAFVR.
- 1003772 A. White, RAFVR.
- 1036887 F. W. Whitehead, RAFVR.
- 1512312 J. Wilkinson, RAFVR.
- 140030 K. Wilkinson.
- 1507088 R. A. Wilkinson, RAFVR.
- 1580665 A. Williams, RAFVR.
- 1403159 H. Williams, RAFVR.
- 1659860 J. E. Williams, RAFVR.
- 1298461 W. Williams, RAFVR.
- 1133190 R. Williamson, RAFVR.
- 1130555 D. O. Willis, RAFVR.
- 1717416 R. R. Willis, RAFVR.
- 1237621 J. Wilson, RAFVR.
- 1440674 W. S. Wilson, RAFVR.
- 1635144 J. F. Winship, RAFVR.
- 1409436 W. E. J. R. Withers, RAFVR.
- 1469413 F. J. Wood, RAFVR.
- 1012853 H. Wood, RAFVR.
- 941517 R. A. Woolley, RAFVR.
- 1226755 S. Woolsey, RAFVR.
- 1655396 C. K. Worrall, RAFVR.
- 1306817 L. A. Wyncherley, RAFVR.
- 1264360 A. E. Yaxley, RAFVR.
- 1439680 W. E. Yems, RAFVR.
- 1715933 J. R. Young, RAFVR.

Aircraftmen 1st Class

- 1142980 P. J. Abel, RAFVR.
- 3021661 F. Atkinson, RAFVR.
- 1809573 R. Baxter, RAFVR.
- 2208481 S. H. Boyd, RAFVR.
- 1299116 N. A.Bradshaw, RAFVR.
- 1759208 H. Button, RAFVR.
- 554937 A. Clark, RAFVR.
- 1830074 H. R. Dearn, RAFVR.
- 1523203 A. N. Dodd, RAFVR.
- 1901174 W. H. Drury, RAFVR.
- 1647594 G. L. Evans, RAFVR.
- 1513381 J. Gee, RAFVR.
- 1224732 L. H. Gleghorn, RAFVR.
- 1067614 J. Gregory, RAFVR.
- 1628425 L. A. Hollyman, RAFVR.
- 1830795 K. H. Jenkins, RAFVR.
- 852197 N. G. Kimberlin, AAF.
- 1612719 R. F. Ladbrook, RAFVR.
- 1506335 J. A. Lemendin, RAFVR.
- 993433 J. McIntyre, RAFVR.
- 1893566 G. McNamara, RAFVR.
- 1540182 R. H. Morris, RAFVR.
- 1524916 M. Overend, RAFVR.
- 1851624 D. F. Parslow, RAFVR.
- 1032813 J. T. Pike, RAFVR.
- 963591 C. A. Preston, RAFVR.
- 2201655 A. Render, RAFVR.
- 1643193 G. T. Riley, RAFVR.
- 3006221 A. B. Saxby, RAFVR.
- 1689582 W. R. Shaw, RAFVR.
- 1873975 L. H. Smith, RAFVR.
- 1275149 W. A. Smith, RAFVR.
- 1631948 B. Stimson, RAFVR.

Aircraftmen 2nd Class

- 1882681 F. Chapman, RAFVR.
- 1872697 C. C. Elsom, RAFVR.
- 1829494 E. C. Garry, RAFVR.
- 1876560 E. L. Vann, RAFVR.

== Princess Mary's Royal Air Force Nursing Service ==
Acting Senior Sister

- D. G. Masters (5143).

Sisters

- J. E. Daly (5506).
- C. C. Hipkin (5653).
- R. V. M. Hullis (5276).
- S. G. A. Hamilton (5644).

== Women's Auxiliary Air Force ==
Squadron Officers

- K. F. Carr (439).
- K. I. Connal (19).
- K. C. Hunt (247).
- A. E. Knight (100).
- D. Langham (314).
- M. B. Measures (137).
- I. R. Prideaux (921).

Acting Squadron Officer

- J. A. Hill (2434).

Flight Officers

- M. Andrew (4984).
- M. T. T. Aytoun (1440).
- S. M. J. Bowring (1824).
- D. H. Britain (1125).
- J. Burrett (2160).
- B. W. Smith-Carrington (209).
- V. D. Dent (1600).
- M. E. De Putron (1257).
- F. T. Franklin (463).
- E. Z. Gauntlett (2788).
- Q. F. Green (2018).
- J. W. S. Green (2518).
- O. B. Greenslade (2368).
- M. M. Hoare (2312).
- H. Jamieson (4710).
- M. A. Jones (1586).
- J. H. Lawrence (6485).
- R, M. M. McCutcheon (5442).
- L. McEntee (425).
- J. D. McKay (377).
- K. Martin (3242).
- L. G. Moore (5291).
- G. M. P. Morgan (351).
- J. A. Palmer (1737).
- E. M. Pasley (2682).
- Dr. P. P. Pigott (4578).
- A. Pink (2724).
- D. R. Pitts (1900).
- M. Crawford-Smith (1099).
- M. L. Wareham (1803).
- S. Willson (2133).

Acting Flight Officers

- E. L. Barsham (5188).
- M. B. Binns (2480).
- J. Bradbury (4902).
- M. E. Heddle (3892).
- F. M. Hopkins (889).
- J. Leake (6352).
- P. V. Mccabe (2371)
- K. Roberts (579).
- E. A. Skoulding (2351).

Section Officers

- D. J. Babington (3877).
- M. M. Bannister (6939).
- M. D. V. Beard (735).
- P. M. Bed Worth (4670).
- O. Boyd (4899).
- D. T. Bridgewater (4303).
- M. L. Buchanan (6530).
- M. E. Catterall (3439).
- M. Chambers (4094).
- M. M. Dare (5016).
- D. Davidson (5922).
- S. V. Dryden (6675).
- A. N. Edwards (3579).
- J. M. Goldsborough (107).
- M. Greenwood (3927).
- E. M. Hyde (5875)
- D. E. King (6636).
- J. W. Lovett (4844).
- J. Lowrie (4999).
- J. E. Macleod (6420).
- E. M. M. Monypenny (3121).
- B. K. Moss (6928).
- J. Mullen (3034).
- P. M. Pigeon (2022).
- M. E. Price (2305).
- J. Reid (3691).
- J. E. M. Reid (7220).
- F. Roberts (6942).
- M. E. Robinson (5754).
- D. M. Romanes (5890).
- M. E. Rowbottom (2025).
- K. V. Russell (6618).
- P. K. Savery (3319).
- W. L. H. Shaw (3492).
- V. J. M. Shillitoe (6775).
- H. M. Shuttleworth (6272).
- M. H. Smith (6014).
- V. W. Smith (2750).
- K. F. Stevenson (925).
- E. R. Third (6089).
- R. C. Ure (1943).
- D. M. Wyllie (6666).

Warrant Officers

- B. V. Collins (890499).
- M. L. Grantham (886919).

Flight Sergeants

- 420737 F. C. Bailey.
- 887704 L. B. Bloomer.
- 886440 A. Brown.
- 897 I. C. Henderson.
- 420392 L. M. Kynaston.
- 882283 O. M. Lean.
- 882658 F. Macdonald.
- 891798 A. M. Manton.
- 888299 J. M. Muir.
- 883376 A. M. Shaw
- 893466 E. Stephenson.
- 892524 E. Udall.

Sergeants

- 431411 I. M. Anderson.
- 890441 S. B. Anderson.
- 2006581 J. M. Bartholomew.
- 2005194 J. W. Bennett.
- 477887 J. E. Billing.
- 466683 G. M. Birch.
- 431210 J. Bosschey.
- 441695 M. W. Bowers.
- 2020098 E. M. Bringes.
- 449762 T. E. Brown.
- 2060338 J. M. Burden.
- 893125 B. M. Castle.
- 449863 G. J. Croft.
- 2049193 G. Crowther.
- 424331 M. Cullen.
- 447291 L. W. Davies.
- 893914 F. M. Dimond.
- 2070128 E. M. Dinnere.
- 443076 P. Donaldson.
- 448744 M. E. Gardner.
- 442615 K. A. Duncan-Goodman.
- 886284 M. P. Harraway.
- 477667 P. W. Haydon.
- 440889 J. K. Hemstalk.
- 897496 L. Hunt.
- 2080442 M. Husband.
- 420631 M. A. Jackson.
- 477692 H. James.
- 446036 D. M. Jenno.
- 880959 K. Jordan.
- 420578 E. M. Keith.
- 445019 B. D. Knowles.
- 468308 P. A. Lampard.
- 2019681 J. MacArthur.
- 454576 D. M. N. Miller.
- 2022665 L. C. Moon.
- 891688 C. M. Oldham.
- 895586 D. Penfold.
- 477897 S. H. Patriche.
- 2005293 J. M. Ratcliffe.
- 50419 K. M. Ridley.
- 420368 M. Salomon.
- 454230 E. Shaw.
- 443336 M. Sim.
- 447323 K. B. Skelding.
- 891292 W. A. Stevenson.
- 2069685 J. E. Tague.
- 895396 L. M. I. Talbot.
- 884572 G. V. Tassell.
- 886310 K. Turner.
- 421982 E. Wales.
- 465950 E. Walton.
- 426203 V. D. A. West.
- 2088014 E. E. M. Winson.
- 436577 E. Wright.

Acting Sergeants

- 445583 O. L. Dollery.
- 895775 M. M. Stevens.

Corporals

- 2064471 G. R. Alibone.
- 2089307 E. Allen.
- 2010682 M. Archer.
- 445126 J. Arden.
- 2087851 J. Atherton.
- 2050558 D. Atkins.
- 2025806 J. Austin.
- 472394 M. I. Bailey.
- 890986 D. Bain.
- 447368 E. G. Balderstone.
- 2012106 F. H. Barnes.
- 2027634 I. M. Barry.
- 431712 N. Bean.
- 2007797 D. M. Bedingfield.
- 456378 E. M. Bell.
- 461446 J. M. Bignell.
- 2055795 W. S. Bowers.
- 891576 I. Bradford.
- 445177 V. Brookes.
- 2081195 E. Burrows.
- 2059524 F. M. Burrows.
- 2010303 J. Butler.
- 2014954 E. A. Byford.
- 428084 E. Clayton.
- 440108 G. E. M. Cockram.
- 2005511 P. Cody.
- 2015606 C. M. Copas.
- 449737 H. E. Cox.
- 2007794 J. K. Cracknell.
- 2050470 N. M. Crowther.
- 886894 J. Cumberbatch.
- 454556 G. A. Cumming.
- 466392 J. P. Davis.
- 458734 G. K. Dawkins.
- 2068948 B. J. Dean.
- 2081059 H. Devlin.
- 883189 H. C. Dix.
- 448993 L. A. Donald.
- 2031487 N. E. A. Downie.
- 20446111. K. Dryden.
- 2058041 J. Evans.
- 441388 V. M. Everest.
- 2043625 M. H. Froud.
- 2091098 E. Goodfellow.
- 2061706 O. M. Gorton.
- 426034 I. H. Green.
- 432933 S. B. Grudgings.
- 422286 I. R. Harbord.
- 893530 C. I. Harding.
- 448547 M. E. Hartley.
- 2040137 J. R. S. Hawkins.
- 446101 E. J. Hodgkinson.
- 2026843 M. E. Hopkins.
- 2057306 S. L. Hopkinson.
- 2026066 A. Hughes.
- 2032293 G. N. Hurlin.
- 446920 M. D. James.
- 421643 F. Johnston.
- 432325 R. A. Jones.
- 427642 L. Kay.
- 2064167 M. McL. Kay.
- 424737 M. W. Keith.
- 896216 D. R. King.
- 897117 E. M. Lamden.
- 2086473 J. E. Lewis.
- 462298 A. M. Liddell.
- 2004312 A. J. Little.
- 462227 E. W. Livemore.
- 455725 P. E. Lucken.
- 2016300 L. M. McCabe.
- 2136405 J. Marsden.
- 433900 J. Milne.
- 2046239 B. M. Morrison.
- 427.881 P. V. Newman.
- 2028615 D. Noyes.
- 2008648 B. W. O'Keefe.
- 430421 M. F. Oliver.
- 2025516 M. W. Osborne.
- 2004956 S. M. Overend.
- 424058 E. Parker.
- 2058087 V. Parker.
- 430042 M. L. Perfect.
- 885499 M. M. Perrin.
- 457254 B. Pick.
- 432291 D. Potter.
- 428760 B. A. Pratt.
- 426362 N. E. Raines.
- 2011929 B. Rase.
- 430783 E. A. Reid.
- 2013672 J. P. Reid.
- 458831 N. E. Rogers.
- 468202 G. Rollings.
- 2991503 D. Ross.
- 2148024 M. B. Sheen.
- 447833 F. Shields.
- 2038121 M. T. Shepherd.
- 451120 I. M. Sidle.
- 434678 D. J. Simons.
- 2059119 J. E. Smith.
- 2086289 J. B. Summers.
- 2050646 C. M. Taylor.
- 2009729 E. A. Taylor.
- 474821 T. D. Thomas.
- 2052756 J. Thompson.
- 2004815 R. Thrush.
- 423161 M. H. Tomblin.
- 433526 E. Tomlinson.
- 2051203 M. Townsend.
- 2049408 C. Triner.
- 452994 G. M. Tysoe.
- 425646 K. M. Voice.
- 433661 E. Walker.
- 2082198 E. A. Wennell.
- 2029133 R. E. Weston.
- 2042036 A. C. Whillans.
- 456660 M. M. Wills.
- 2010843 D. M. Wilson.
- 2088715 D. Wright.
- 2016137 I. D. Wyatt.
- 426541 L. F. Yuill.

Acting Corporals

- 2055862 M. K. Forrest.
- 462571 K. M. Rollings.

Leading Aircraftwomen

- 440369 Y. Anton.
- 469415 J. V. Arthey.
- 2065992 G. A. Arthur.
- 2131785 M. N. Ash.
- 2135961 J. Ashton.
- 2125319 B. E. E. Baker.
- 2140716 J. A. Baker.
- 2080801 M. E. Baker.
- 2133539 L. Bartram.
- 2138035 G. P. Bateson.
- 2018864 V. E. Beaney.
- 2094183 M. E. Bennett.
- 2130571 H. Benwick.
- 435760 R. Birkett.
- 483379 M. R. Birmingham.
- 2036658 B. J. Bissell.
- 474832 J. D. Blackwell.
- 2092957 J. Bowerbank.
- 2095830 B. Boynton.
- 2040920 S. Brind.
- 2032680 M. Brown.
- 2028454 J. M. Bulmer.
- 482239 J. K. Cable.
- 2143364 E. Campbell.
- 434766 J. M. Campbell.
- 2070204 D. U. Carlyle.
- 2111458 E. C. Carter.
- 2137089 E. Cash.
- 458426 M. Chadwick.
- 2016029 B. M. Chapman.
- 2052250 E. A. Clarke.
- 2032178 E. Cluer.
- 2065646 I. E. Cockram.
- 457197 U. D. Compton.
- 2098763 E. M. Copeland
- 2146409 K. M. Cowdroy.
- 2149688 P. E. Cowling.
- 480292 M. D. Crapper.
- 458887 K. E. Crockford.
- 465789 J. Davison.
- 425813 E. M. Day.
- 2141642 P. I. Day.
- 468310 A. Deakin.
- 452974 J. De Gruchy.
- 2130384 R. V. Denny.
- 460372 E. Derrick.
- 2066577 E. Dorothy.
- 2057202 V. E. Doubtfire.
- 2038953 E. Duckworth.
- 2077202 E. Duffey.
- 2118420 E. Elliott.
- 2136761 M. Ellwood.
- 2000746 B. Elmsie.
- 2028513 E. M. Wyn-Evans.
- 2137070 M. Farrar.
- 478827 S. M. Farrow.
- 2004478 A. E. Fletcher.
- 432964 E. M. Flinton.
- 435148 K. L. Ford.
- 489737 V. J. Garnham.
- 457100 A. M. Gartell.
- 2000797 D. L. Galvin.
- 2005096 M. B. Gerred.
- 2011473 O. M. Goodchild.
- 488970 A. J. Grady.
- 457839 I. M. Green.
- 2032247 J. A. Gregory.
- 481761 M. Grimmett.
- 2048570 A. Guppy.
- 2035180 E. M. I. Halls.
- 473430 M. G. Hammond.
- 2024256 A. M. Hampshire.
- 2061472 B. L. Hanford.
- 2044528 M. Harness.
- 2027577 D. D. Harris.
- 2141021 S. G. Harrison.
- 468334 J. Hayes.
- 2068976 D. E. Heard.
- 458274 M. E. Hepburn.
- 2067352 E. V. A. Hermann.
- 454776 E. M. Herriott.
- 2012600 F. M. Hicks.
- 2058218 E. L. Higgs.
- 2002405 F. M. Horstman.
- 487104 G. M. A. E. Humphrey.
- 434556 M. Hunt.
- 2038105 E. R. Hunter.
- 2033092 D. K. Hyland.
- 2049940 J. Ingle.
- 2138661 M. Jackson.
- 2135960 Z. M. Jacques.
- 2064419 E. C. Jemmett.
- 466596 J. D. Jenkins.
- 472856 G. A. Johnstone.
- 2130355 M. H, Jones.
- 890672 H. E. Kimnell.
- 2063670 E. Kinnersley.
- 464408 D. Kirkham.
- 943040 C. Kitson.
- 456886 D. Lee.
- 2053958 D. K. Leeman.
- 2043402 K. R. Leith.
- 2075986 M. E. Lewis.
- 2006843 C. M. Lock.
- 426267 V. K. G. Lodge.
- 463049 A. T. Loutit.
- 490754 M. Lunn.
- 894602 N. McArthur.
- 2144616 J. O. McDonald.
- 433293 E. McRitchie.
- 2044942 I. Malcolm.
- 2032070 M. K. Megson.
- 435256 A. Meiklejohn.
- 2059261 A. W. Milns.
- 2044944 V. M. Muir.
- 457696 J. E. Murrell.
- 2007997 M. L. Naylor.
- 2029794 D. E. Newbury.
- 2025335 A. C. Niblett.
- 445234 H. M. Pearson.
- 2012562 E. E. Perry.
- 2133846 I. R. Pickering.
- 481285 E. P. M. Pine.
- 2105964 E. P. Pratt.
- 2075236 O. D. Preece.
- 471721 V. Preston.
- 2063466 P. G. Prosser.
- 2061114 S. Protheroe.
- 421009 J. Quinn.
- 882542 A. M. Riordan.
- 1664909 R. H. G. Robins.
- 2134186 E. D. Ruffles.
- 2004288 E. L. Scoffield.
- 2043158 M. J. Seabrook.
- 441059 E. A. A. Searies.
- 2055891 J. Shearer.
- 2105312 J. Shufflbotham.
- 2062493 D. Simpson.
- 2053837 A. N. Skinns.
- 467442 E. Slack.
- 2130308 L. F. Slade.
- 2035234 D. J. Smart.
- 464362 D. Smith.
- 2071633 L. M. Smith.
- 2032470 K. I. Sole.
- 487065 R. L. Spash.
- 2049061 N. A. Spindler.
- 2045066 J. Standbrook.
- 2137098 T. Steele.
- 2041017 B. C. Stewart.
- 447176 J. F. Taylor.
- 2115320 W. Taylor.
- 2090957 K. A. Temkin.
- 2041559 P. E. Travers.
- 451992 D. M. Turner.
- 462550 E. Varey.
- 469442 J. E. Wain.
- 2043547 H. Waugh.
- 478694 J. M. Webb.
- 20000332 C. E. M. Weedon.
- 485249 M. Widdowson.
- 2116556 J. G. Will.
- 489640 L. I. Wilson.
- 427542 M. Wilson.
- 2026669 V. W. Wood.
- 475106 B. M. Woodman.
- 2057217 J. Wright.
- 2028913 O. E. Wright.
- 449657 N. H. E. Wynne.

Aircraftwomen 1st Class

- 2131569 L. Abdurehman.
- 476364 M. B. Bell.
- 2093169 J. Blackbird.
- 2048157 E. M. U. Davison.
- 466093 A. G. Godfrey.
- 458205 G. M. Hart.
- 483717 A. J. Kinver.
- 477932 A. P. Miller.
- 488576 J. E. Newman.
- 484565 A. J. Peacock.
- 434379 J. D. Wright.

Aircraftwomen 2nd Class

- 488338 J. D. Brown.
- 2148809 D. N. Cox.
- 483625 F. A. Elkington.
- 2130412 P. E. Richards.
- 460473 D. A. E. Timms.

== Royal Australian Air Force ==
Wing Commander

- J. M. Hampshire, DFC (Aus.256).

Acting Wing Commanders

- H. G. Cooke, DFC (Aus.403860).
- W. L. Kerr (Aus.26642).

Squadron Leaders

- L. W. Carson (Aus.293136).
- A. J. A. Day (Aus.407138).
- T. K. Dollahan (Aus.163141).
- A. H. Greenham (Aus.287411).
- A. E. Guymer (Aus.405016).
- D. M. Hannah (Aus.400412).
- A. C. Hardy (Aus.400191).
- J. H. McDougall (Aus.263157).
- J. E. Pike (Aus.271018).
- G. Roberts (Aus.253189).
- J. P. H. Wheaton (Aus.402556).

Acting Squadron Leaders

- P. J. Cornwall, DFM (Aus.14850).
- N. S. Griffen (Aus.257625).
- A. T. Hogan (Aus.293036).
- G. J. Jenkin (Aus.263017).
- K. McIntyre, DFC (Aus.413230).
- H. C. R. Marten (Aus.287434).
- G. O. Singleton (Aus.400841).
- G. E. Taylor (Aus.407690).

Flight Lieutenants

- H. L. F. Bader (Aus.293131).
- N. K. Baker (Aus.410205).
- R. H. Brown (Aus.401500).
- H. L. Connell (Aus.409084).
- R. J. Conroy (Aus.412113).
- S. A. Crichton (Aus.414473).
- J. W. Creighton (Aus.410217).
- G. G. Dangar (Aus.264373).
- C. G. Fereday (Aus.410116).
- W. S. Ferguson (Aus.257623).
- F. J. Hanson (Aus.407958).
- J. Harrison (Aus.417073).
- R. R. Huxtable (Aus.264705).
- M. A. Kemp (Aus.416218).
- J. M. Kirkman (Aus.406017).
- W. Leach (Aus.425524).
- C. H. Lewis (Aus.409558).
- V. J. McCauley (Aus.403936).
- A. J. Newton (Aus.14040).
- R. J. Robert (Aus.408179).
- J. R. Ross (Aus.401721).
- J. L. Sharpe (Aus.264716).
- R. H. Sutton (Aus.407959).
- B. S. Tait (Aus.403608).
- H. P. Van Renen (Aus.409258).
- C. G. Walker (Aus.406336).
- K. A. Witford (Aus.417256).
- F. A. Woithe (Aus.416305).
- E. C. Wright (Aus.413813).

Acting Flight Lieutenants

- L. J. Dyke (Aus.10192).
- L. J. Hart (Aus.423725).
- T. H. Hollis (Aus.5001).
- D. G. Highman (Aus.406394).
- J. A. O'Meara (Aus.401828).
- C. C. Peacock (Aus.408158).
- F. C. Pearce (Aus.412834).

Flying Officers

- M. Adams (Aus.400613).
- G. R. Anderson, DFC (Aus.413330).
- R. E. Bavington (Aus.403895).
- R. N. Bell (Aus.406322).
- K. J. Biltoft (Aus.4264).
- J. L. Breed (Aus.415610).
- F. J. Brenton (Aus.418051).
- W. H. Brooker (Aus.407982).
- J. C. Buckland (Aus.401006).
- J. K. Cowan (Aus.410856).
- D. B. Dalton (Aus.420863).
- J. Darling (Aus.418998).
- R. D. Hodgen (Aus.413594).
- J. A. C. Kennedy, DFC (Aus.409001).
- C. W. King (Aus.420682).
- C. M. Lawson (Aus.409843).
- R. T. Loury (Aus.426628).
- J. A. McLachlan (Aus.412260).
- S. J. Montgomery (Aus.423277).
- B. G. Neill (Aus.414818).
- R. C. Neilson (Aus.412652).
- J. J. Parker (Aus.412829).
- F. J. B. Parnell (Aus.415091).
- R. C. Pritchard (Aus.400123).
- R. M. Robson (Aus.406491).
- D. J. Roydhouse (Aus.419162).
- B. G. Sago (Aus.401671).
- R. M. Sommerville (Aus.422735).
- E. D. Stuart (Aus.22579).
- J. E. C. Tait (Aus.36040).
- V. R. Thatcher (Aus.420302).
- R. G. Tickner (Aus.420304)
- G. V. K. Vale (Aus.207818).
- G. Walker (Aus.411061).
- J. R. C. Walton (Aus.414530).
- T. W. Webster (Aus.421063).
- C. S. Wilson (Aus.425786).
- K. A. Wilson (Aus.414449).
- J. S. Yull (Aus.415296).

Pilot Officers

- E. A. Brown (Aus.415225).
- A. C. Dutch (Aus.428770).
- L. A. Einsaar, D.F.M (Aus.407318).
- W. T. K. Hall (Aus.426744).
- R. Lyall (Aus.409160).
- M. E. Mills (Aus.425866).
- T. B. Smith (Aus.6122).
- W. Summerton (Aus.419355).

Warrant Officers

- W. K. Bridges (Aus.415502).
- J. L. Cavenagh (Aus.426044).
- S. J. Farrell (Aus.412809).
- L. T. J. Holm (Aus.425011).
- F. W. Moss (Aus.421040).
- G. R. Oliver (Aus.415352).
- R. J. O'Sullivan (Aus.415910).
- E. J. P. H. Power (Aus.421078).
- R. W. Scott (Aus.418184).
- K. C. Tweedie (Aus.417136).
- J. H. White (Aus.409974).

Flight Sergeants

- Aus.434213 L. R. Bodey.
- Aus.410317 G. M. Drummond.
- Aus.1414 W. G. P. Elly.
- Aus.2553 N. H. Georges.
- Aus.25092 A. Gilbert.
- Aus.425852 J. W. Howell.
- Aus.14149 W. J. Litvensky.
- Aus.418756 A. W. Matthews.
- Aus.5640 K. W. Muzzell.
- Aus.5220 C. F. A. Percy.
- Aus.8637 W. R. Philpot.
- Aus.11406 T. C. Skinner.
- Aus.434664 S. T. Sloane.
- Aus.4308 C. E. Tessier.
- Aus.6965 S. W. Woodroffe.

Sergeants

- Aus.31419 R. C. Brazier.
- Aus.6562 D. H. L. Hely.
- Aus.401215 N. G. Hemphill.
- Aus.15163 G. Kelleher.
- Aus.22358 H. S. Story.
- Aus.41208 R. Thomas.

Corporal

- Aus.5858 D. B. Espie.

Leading Aircraftman

- Aus.29991 J. Riseley.

== Royal Canadian Air Force ==
Acting Group Captains

- J. B. Millward.
- W. P. Pleasace.

Wing Commanders

- W. P. Dunphy (Can/C.1038).
- J. H. Giguere (Can/C.1997).
- R. A. Gordon (Can/C.1467)
- E. A. D. Hutton (Can/C.1124).
- C. O. King (Can/C.2543).
- W. R. Ouderkirk (Can/C.3553).
- S. A. Terroux (Can/C.1943).

Acting Wing Commanders

- J. F. P. Clarke (Can/J.15167).
- E. T. M. Duggan (Can/C.3043).
- G. J. J. Edwards (Can/J.14045).
- P. J. Grant (Can/C.1521).
- R. J. Hardingham (Can/J.4691).
- D. V. Button (Can/C.4088).
- L. Lowenstein (Can/C.5020).
- H. H. Poyntz (Can/C.5940).

Squadron Leaders

- J. A. Amos (Can/J.3515).
- R. P. Bales (Can/C.9887).
- F. K. Belton (Can/C.965).
- W. A. Bentley (Can/C.3643).
- C. E. Bishop (Can/C.3828).
- D. A. Brewster (Can/C.9888).
- D. A. Brownlee (Can/C.5194).
- A. R. Dawson (Can/C.9831).
- L. J. Dennett (Can/C.7178).
- W. Farquharson (Can/3139).
- D. B. Freeman (Can/J.15228).
- T. J. G. Harper (Can/J.8333).
- G. C. Hault (Can/C.2036).
- R. R. B. Hoodspith (Can/C.1595).
- F. J. B. Humphrys (Can/C.3309).
- R. W. A. Ivermee (Can/C.451).
- W. C. Kent (Can/C.867).
- J. M. Kenyon (Can/C.4049).
- B. J. Knight (Can/C.7711).
- E. F. Kusch (Can/C.2867).
- T. D. McKee (Can/C.5190).
- W. N. F. McLean (Can/C.3228).
- G. R. Munro (Can/C.3374).
- A. L. Musselman (Can/C.8108).
- W. J. Osborne (Can/C.7962).
- C. J. Pattee (Can/C.5019).
- H. W. Riley (Can/C.4069).
- C. R. Scott (Can/C.3866).
- W. Skelding (Can/C.7930).
- N. K. Skelton (Can/C.1523).
- A. C. Stagg (Can/C.8500).
- R. H. Walker (Can/C.9425).
- L. F. Wells (Can/J.7518).
- A. D. Williams (Can/C.3986).

Honorary Squadron Leaders

- C. Clarke (Can/C.8513).
- J. P. Lardie (Can/C.13176).
- J. W. T. Van Gorder (Can/C.9981).

Acting Squadron Leaders

- C. A. S. Anderson (Can/J.6956).
- J. C. Beers (Can/J.10712).
- J. W. Bellis (Can/J.5502).
- W. E. R. Boone (Can/C.9830).
- D. Boyle (Can/J.4325).
- N. M. Boyd (Can/C.15550).
- E. A. Brain (Can 73.16428).
- F. D. Cleland (Can/C.8532).
- R. Cushley (Can/C.9306).
- C. Edgar (Can/C.8676).
- J. J. Feller (Can/C.3972).
- W. W. Flynn (Can/C.4700).
- L. R. Freeman (Can/C.2660).
- N. J. Gallagher (Can/C.9371).
- W. G. Gardiner (Can/J.8137).
- K. T. Hawley (Can/C.4788).
- D. A. Inman (Can/J.16149).
- F. T. Judan (Can/J.9508).
- P. S. Leggat (Can/J.4788).
- J. G. M. Loomis (Can/C.8264).
- H. F. C. Lount (Can/C.7284).
- D. W. McMartin (Can/C.10845).
- N. L. Magnusson (Can/J.17168).
- D. J. Neville (Can/C.9010).
- G. W. Paul (Can/C.7511).
- T. R. Walker (Can/C.1869).
- J. P. Walmsley (Can/C.15564).
- C. L. Walton (Can/C.7721).
- H. J. Wilson (Can/C.8863).
- S. R. Wyman (Can/J.8330).

Chaplain

- The Rev. W. J. M. Swan.

Flight Lieutenants

- R. M. Ainslie (Can/C.21772).
- E. S. Annis (Can/J.12725).
- A. D. Baillie (Can/C.13665).
- L. T. Banner (Can/C.13127).
- R. N. Bassarab (Can/J.22239).
- H. M. Bell (Can/C.6053).
- P. G. Blades (Can/J.6371).
- S. M. Bolton (Can/C.11394).
- A. F. Broadbridge (Can/C.12177).
- R. Burns, DFC (Can/J.18363).
- C. J. Cameron (Can/C.5627).
- W. I. Campbell Can/C.7964).
- L. C. Card (Can/C.15730).
- H. H. Gordon-Cooper (Can/J.20364).
- J. C. Copeland (Can/J.9421).
- W. Copley (Can/C.10938).
- W. W. J. David (Can/C.11892).
- H. A. W. Dawson (Can/C.7118).
- P. K. Deane (Can/J.13844).
- H. De Solla (Can/J.14707).
- W. J. H. Disher (Can/C.12378).
- E. O. Doyle (Can/J.11471).
- H. E. Duggleby (Can/J.10955).
- H. W. Eggleston (Can/C.7699).
- C. J. Evans (Can/J.3731).
- C. B. Feight (Can/J.13022).
- A. R. Fisher (Can/J.22571).
- R. G. Frederick (Can/J.8125).
- H. P. Fuller (Can/J.17752).
- J. E. German (Can/C.8992).
- N. Green (Can/C.9030).
- F. H. Hachmann (Can/J.11181).
- D. G. Hall (Can/C.17597).
- W. S. Hall (Can/C.12380).
- B. A. Harper (Can/J.16518).
- C. R. Higgens (Can/C.3371).
- 5. S. Holland (Can/J.16395).
- J. P. C. Howard (Can/C.4991).
- R. M. Howard (Can/C.7279).
- D. G. Bell-Irving (Can/J.10640).
- H. A. Ivens (Can/J.10649).
- G. W. Jacques (Can/C.11201).
- W. G. Klassen (Can/C.9890).
- A. M. Larson (Can/J.12841).
- H. D. Link (Can/J.11848).
- P. N. J. Logan (Can/J.17678).
- N. R. Logan (Can/J.11467).
- H. S. Lowerison (Can/C.8783).
- H. C. Lyle (Can/C.11378).
- D. A. McAlpine (Can/C.3056).
- B. L. Miller (Can/J.17436).
- J. H. Miller (Can/J.29576).
- J. A. J. Murray (Can/J.12471).
- H. J. Nodder (Can/J.14733).
- A. J. Norton (Can/J.11961).
- D. F. O'Neill (Can/J.24506).
- S. M. Paulson (Can/C.13570).
- G. H. Pierce (Can/C.16596).
- R. C. Pirie (Can/J.14138).
- R. Rawsthorne (Can/J.22791).
- W. R. Rothwell (Can/C.22927).
- J. D. Runkle (Can/C.6448).
- J. E. R. St. Amour (Can/C.13682).
- F. M. Sawyer (Can/J.10596).
- W. M. Schierer (Can/J.20063).
- C. F. B. Seager (Can/C.10194).
- L. W. Seath (Can/J.10275).
- G. C. Smith (Can/J,1803).
- P. C. Smith (Can/J. 8223).
- C. E. B. Stewart (Can/J.8152).
- D. B. Stewart (Can/C.13907).
- E. J. Stockall (Can/C.8029).
- R. H. Thomson (Can/J.10280).
- 5. F. D. Tuke (Can/C.17384).
- N. I. Tycho (Can/J.23109).
- P. C. Wall (Can/C.15946).
- S. J. Waller (Can/J.10012).
- W. J. Wilson (Can/C.6118).
- H. H. Woodhead (Can/C.15868).

Acting Flight Lieutenants

- T. E. C. Ainslie, DFC (Can/C.28055).
- J. M. Anguish (Can/J.8435).
- H. N. Cuming (Can/J.19790).
- H. D. Davy (Can/J.17815).
- O. W. Fonger, DFC (Can/J.21918).
- J. E. Johnston (Can/C.15932).
- R. La Turner (Can/C.27109).
- D. I. Mackenzie (Can/C.19225).
- G. R. Panchuk (Can/C.18825).
- C. S. Railton (Can/J.26609).
- R. P. Schwalm (Can/C.18951).
- J. A. Soden (Can/J.28460).
- P. C. Thompson (Can/J.28501).
- W. A. Warwick (Can/C.16470).
- L. J. Wilson (Can/J.16956).

Flying Officers

- W. Baker (Can/J.23291).
- R. E. Barnlund (Can/J.27284).
- G. H. Barrable (Can/C.87517).
- R. W. Barton (Can/J.87463).
- J. C. P. Bauset (Can/J.23639).
- J. W. Bonner (Can/J.17808).
- R. C. Clark (Can/J.17992).
- A. S. Coldridge (Can/J.26625).
- O. Cook (Can/J.37165).
- R. V. Desaultels (Can/J.26303).
- W. F. Doherty (Can/J.37497).
- W. A. Dunn (Can./C.19764).
- B. W. Dunning (Can/J.19678).
- H. C. Eyjolfsson, DFC (Can/J.85015).
- P. E. H. Ferguson (Can/J.40181).
- G. A. Fox (Can/J.35521).
- H. M. Fox (Can/C.7729).
- S. J. Fox (Can/C.85210).
- F. P. Grant (Can/J.17870).
- F. R. Kearns (Can/J.36358).
- G. E. Langville (Can/J.85756).
- J. G. Y. Lavoie (Can/J.22704).
- D. A. Lennie (Can/J.24617).
- W. A. Lethbridge (Can/J.18561).
- E. B. Lewis (Can/C.37324).
- J. E. R. Locke (Can/J.25433).
- T. E. R. Lodge (Can/J.25483).
- H. W. McDonald (Can/J.25007).
- R. E. Mackerrow (Can/J.36233).
- R. D. McLaren (Can/J.17178).
- D. B. MacLennan (Can/J.39392).
- W. Marsden (Can/C.29453).
- D. N. Meyers (Can/J.87283).
- H. D. Midland (Can/J.24931).
- D. A. Newman (Can/J.6641).
- F. J. Otten (Can/J.15498).
- L. Panzer (Can/J.27423).
- E. R. Patrick (Can/J.15261).
- N. A. Phibbs (Can/J.19137).
- L. A. Plummer (Can./J.26508).
- R. E. Priestman (Can/C.19539).
- G. G. Rattle (Can/J.17653).
- A. T. Richardson (Can/J.29330).
- J. H. Robertson (Can/J.88784).
- M. J. Seguin (Can/J.87910).
- G. L. Sheahan (Can/J.35383).
- R. J. F. Sherk (Can/J.15237).
- B. F. Thirlwell (Can/J.36708).
- J. A. Wilding (Can/J.27908).

Pilot Officers

- G. J. Anton (Can/J.92443).
- H. S. Bell (Can/J.87701).
- W. D. Beacom (Can/J.90223).
- W. V. Beaulieu (Can/J.91018).

Warrant Officers

- J. H. Contant (Can/R.125297).
- C. R. McRae, DFM (Can/R.191057).

Warrant Officers 1st Class

- K. M. Forsythe (Can/R.117274).
- J. R. Gosby (Can/130A).
- R. L. Jones (Can/R.50717).
- J. Maskell (Can/626).
- E. H. Miller (Can/C.7623).
- E. H. Ranson (Can /R. 162125).
- J. Walmsley (Can/2464).

Warrant Officer 2nd Class

- P. Weir (Can/144A).

Acting Warrant Officers

- R. E. Perry (Can/6610).
- J. E. R. Pruneau (Can/R.66972).
- M. S. Sargeant (Can/R.99002).

Flight Sergeants

- Can/R.61884 M. Anderson.
- Can/4299 R. G. C. Beatty.
- Can/R.70747 J. A. G. V. Beauregarde.
- Can/R.53501 E. L. Bradley.
- Can/4811 M. H. Brooks.
- Can/R.104195 H. N. Coll.
- Can/R.54601 S. Colmer.
- Can/R.50276 G. Desjardins.
- Can/50197 J. S. Eaton.
- Can/R.69014 W. J. Gray.
- Can/R.50300 C. Gunne.
- Can/R.76080 H. L. Harper.
- Can/R.98776 R. G. Hermanson.
- Can/6618 W. E. Higinbotham.
- Can/R.53004 A. D. Job.
- Can/R.52307 A. Jones.
- Can/R.112556 R. W. Justice.
- Can/11611 K. D. Leslie.
- Can/R.161644 N. Marcus.
- Can/R.60410 J. E. Melton.
- Can/7832 W. Michael.
- Can/R.57625 E. Miller.
- Can/R.50256 F. D. Mitton.
- Can/R.83647 W. K. Morton.
- Can/R.68160 H. A. Mott.
- Can/R.51597 F. J. Otway.
- Can/R.64063 G. E. Pidduck.
- Can/R.131517 F. E. Reain.
- Can/R.160354 G. K. Sherwin.
- Can/R.52977 G. Snape.
- Can/R.164356 G. L. Stokx.
- Can/R.54924 E. B. Stone.
- Can/R.4003 E. M. Waring.
- Can/R.80373 E. G. Warrington.
- Can/R.4145A D. L. Whellans.

Acting Flight Sergeants

- Can/R.124136 J. Cheremkora.
- Can/R.95873 H. R. Hawkins.
- Can/R.107859 W. A. Newman.

Sergeants

- Can/R.60701 N. G. Allen.
- Can/R.82220 A. L. Argue.
- Can/R.53385 C. A. Baker.
- Can/R.190579 R. H. Banks.
- Can/R.73065 C. F. Bedford.
- Can/R.64450 E. H. J. Berryman.
- Can/R.76479 R. A. Blanchard.
- Can/R.65602 C. H. Bowins.
- Can/R.67580 G. A. Brown.
- Can/R.135553 J. I. A. Chenier.
- Can/R.68056 W. H. Cook.
- Can/R.61317 H. A. Dale.
- Can/R.6535 J. E. Dale.
- Can/R.84027 G. A. Deverell.
- Can/R.65077 E. A. Digout.
- Can/R.90552 J. G. Dodgson.
- Can/R.107352 G. D. Dowler.
- Can/U.202115 G. O. Duffy.
- Can/R.58405 L. P. Eckstrand.
- Can/R.63688 A. K. Fair.
- Can/R.52194 A. W. Faux.
- Can/R.63692 R. V. Finch.
- Can/R.109259 G. R. M. Gibson.
- Can/R.63643 K. R. Greenfield.
- Can/R.119027 K. W. Hall.
- Can/R.99771 J. Hogan.
- Can/R.86389 J. L. Horner.
- Can/R.79722 T. D. Jamieson.
- Can/R.64058 W. Keller.
- Can/R.71514 A. G. Kelly.
- Can/R.62355 T. C. Lane.
- Can/R.82596 J. C. Le Blanc.
- Can/R.204124 K. E. Lussier.
- Can/R.65314 D. McLellan.
- Can/2083A. A. L Mellis.
- Can/R.149196 J. Nind.
- Can/R.53090 M. Nichols.
- Can/R.145196 E. J. Ouelette.
- Can/R.197195 P. E. Palmer.
- Can/R.122035 A. T. Pearson.
- Can/R.92270 D. A. Rankine.
- Can/R.52025 L. Renaud.
- Can/R.55006 J. R. Renouf.
- Can/R.108503 M. J. Rocheleau.
- Can/R.61405 N. Slack.
- Can/R.60037 M. Smith.
- Can/R.143714 A. B. Stanley.
- Can/R.62027 F. W. Tiffin.
- Can/R.140056 C. J. Walker.
- Can/R.143279 F. C. Widiner.
- Can/R.104679 C. L. M. Wilcox.
- Can/R.223500 J. T. Wyers.

Acting Sergeants

- Can/R.214955 G. B. Daines.
- Can/R.143074 H. E. Lock.
- Can/R.96284 C. W. Warner.

Corporals

- Can/R.158787 H. Bach.
- Can/R.61847 E. A. Ball.
- Can/R.72901 I. W. Blondon.
- Can/R.102025 A. F. Boehme.
- Can/R.71202 C. C. Brooking.
- Can/R.76195 D. H. Bruce.
- Can/R.61885 A. G. Burwood.
- Can/R.117134 J. E. Dufresne.
- Can/R.153949 P. Eustace.
- Can/R.91172 T. A. H. Field.
- Can/R-57629 R. J. Fraser.
- Can/R.99312 J. L. R. Gallant.
- Can/R.99326 A. C. Geldhart.
- Can/R.71309 H. C. Green.
- Can/R.89617 H. S. Groff.
- Can/R.80816 Rex Guest.
- Can/R.74166 J. D. Hall.
- Can/R.85551 J. C. Honan.
- Can/R.98576 G. J. A. Kidd.
- Can/R.123283 R. C. Lavery.
- Can/R.83987 J. V. Lennox.
- Can/R.86368 R. A. McCombie.
- Can/R.77668 E. A. McGarvey.
- Can/R.51924 W. J. MacKenzie.
- Can/R.87167 A. D. McLeod.
- Can/R.128128 D. A. MacLeod.
- Can/R.131451 D. M. F. Manson.
- Can/R.83824 A. Medhurst.
- Can/R.132483 E. A. Micklewright.
- Can/R.122510 J. B. Moody.
- Can/R.52586 W. E. Moody.
- Can/R.84976 R. R. Morris.
- Can/R.90615 T. R. Morrison.
- Can/R.139120 F. Noble.
- Can/R.100102 L. J. F. Paquin.
- Can/R.161513 E. Patterson.
- Can/R.149980 G. E. Phillips.
- Can/R.97806 M. Ritchie.
- Can/R.133046 D. Ross.
- Can/R.87820 D. M. Ross.
- Can/R.76486 W. P. Sampson.
- Can/R.102847 W. A. Sanderson.
- Can/R.73381 A. Savoie.
- Can/R.126327 E. T. Simpson.
- Can/R.139822 H. R. Stewart.
- Can/R.70824 H. G. Streight.
- Can/R.107076 S. Thompson.
- Can/R.181799 P. Trinker.

Acting Corporals

- Can/R.178728 L. M. Archibald.
- Can/R.133461 R. H. Lord.
- Can/R.161879 H. W. Mau.
- Can/R.134940 J. T. Mawby.
- Can/R.89050 J. Owen.
- Can/R.154940 F. J. Tilley.
- Can/R.136543 J. L. G. Turgeon.
- Can/R.169635 D. N. West.

Leading Aircraftmen

- Can/R.139624 J. A. Anderson.
- Can/R.176503 E. D. Artz.
- Can/R.96549 J. W. M. Begin.
- Can/R.174388 A. J. Blake.
- Can/R.279099 G. J. Bourgois.
- Can/R.86526 E. F. Breach.
- Can/R.170702 H. F. Brown.
- Can/R.104709 S. B. Brown.
- Can/R.171498 J. J. G. L. Carrier.
- Can/R.181374 G. E. Cowl.
- Can/R.183361 J. F. Cruikshank.
- Can/R.96204 J. W. R. Cunneyworth.
- Can/R.162502 C. D. Davis.
- Can/R.139409 R. J. Dixon.
- Can/R.170699 W. C. Drinkwater.
- Can/R.105970 E. E. Evernden.
- Can/R.101436 W. A. Exworthy.
- Can/R.134877 E. T. Foidart.
- Can/R.169961 R. A. Grant.
- Can/R.202396 A. Gutner.
- Can/R.108810 W. M. Hall.
- Can/R.133408 N. A. Harrison.
- Can/R.110604 S. Joel.
- Can/R.99322 G. O. Kelley.
- Can/R.146299 M. Kibzey.
- Can/R.156006 D. Kidd.
- Can/R.114551 G. A. Koch.
- Can/R.127049 J. H. J. B. Legault.
- Can/R.94698 G. R. Lemon.
- Can/R.159509 J. R. Lunan.
- Can/R.158988 S. T. McEvoy.
- Can/R.175040 D. W. Maker.
- Can/R.62837 J. F. J. M. Marquis.
- Can/R.179185 J. J. R. A. Cinq-Mars.
- Can/R.12020A W. E. Marshall.
- Can/R.145659 C. M. Mehlenbacher.
- Can/R.267068 J. M. Morie.
- Can/R.109305 H. K. Newinger.
- Can/R.149384 C. Nygard.
- Can/R.164911 J. V. C. E. Paradis.
- Can/R.183742 K. F. Porter.
- Can/R.160168 A. A. Pratt.
- Can/R.182394 M. Roher.
- Can/R.212112 W. Romaniuk.
- Can/R.163818 J. T. Shirkie.
- Can/R.168109 J. J. Sims.
- Can/R.103553 M. Stickney.
- Can/R.100287 F. W. S. Swain.
- Can/R.167971 F. J. Walter.
- Can/R.114957 B. J. Warberg.
- Can/R.145450 R. E. Warren.
- Can/R.149998 D. Wiley.
- Can/R.143992 D. D. Wilson.
- Can/R.138046 G. R. Wood.

Aircraftman 1st Class

- Can/R.165347 D. G. Mackenzie.
- Can/R.166074 T. J. Phelps.

Royal Canadian Air Force (Women's Division)
Acting Squadron Officers

- H. A. Buik (Can/V.30111).
- E. A. Engelsen (Can/V.30019).

Flight Officers

- I. V. Gibson (Can/V.30179).
- F. M. Silverlock (Can/V.30368).

Section Officer

- K. J. Wagner (Can/V.30426).

Sergeant

- Can/W.307064 M. E. Norum.

Corporals

- Can/W.300211 Y. M. Cunningham.
- Can/W.301558 M. G. Gillett.

Leading Aircraftwoman

- Can/W.312337 H. D. V. O. Woodcroft.

== Royal New Zealand Air Force ==
Acting Wing Commander

- H. H. J. Miller, DFC, AFC (N.Z.1996).

Acting Squadron Leaders

- W. C. S. Bainbridge (N.Z.2321).
- N. A. Cresswell, DFC (N.Z.41472).
- A. E. Davis, DFC (N.Z.411719).
- I. G. Dunn (N.Z.412214).
- G. R. Gunn (N.Z.411397).
- F. W. Kilgour (N.Z.412701).
- C. F. Ormerod (N.Z.413340).
- D. J. T. Sharp (N.Z.2145).

Flight Lieutenants

- K. H. Beecroft (N.Z.412189).
- D. G. E. Brown (N.Z.405225).
- D. L. Clow (N.Z.41877).
- G. R. Dickson (N.Z.405261).
- E. L. Eason (N.Z.412305).
- R. R. G. Fisher (N.Z.412671).
- L. G. Fowler (N.Z.411878).
- P. S. McBride (N.Z.40980).
- W. McDowall (N.Z.414648)
- K. P. F. Neill (N.Z.41145).
- R. C. Savers (N.Z.41943).
- W. J. R. Scollay (N.Z.41497).
- J. W. Watson (N.Z.41436).
- S. S. Williams (N.Z.412297).

Acting Flight Lieutenants

- H. D. Alcock (N.Z.402928).
- T. G. Dill, DFM (N.Z.42292).
- C. G. McCardle (N.Z.421072).
- D. G. G. Morgan (N.Z.39012).
- K. Smith (N.Z.411948).

Flying Officers

- D. R. Browne, DFM (N.Z.416086).
- C. G. Clarke (N.Z.639098).
- G. C. Couper (N.Z.417026).
- J. A. Crawford (N.Z.425739).
- H. J. Dalzell (N.Z.414263).
- C. J. Hector (N.Z.319354).
- W. J. Marr (N.Z.416513).
- M. Tovey (N.Z.401337).
- J. S. Wilkinson (N.Z.4211042).
- D. C. Colmore-Williams (N.Z.40816).

Flight Sergeant

- N.Z.37214 M. R. Murphy.

Sergeant

- N.Z.437442 R. J. Burkitt.

Leading Aircraftman

- N.Z.413608 W. J. Murphy.

== South African Air Force ==
Lieutenant Colonels

- P. G. Bodley (102215).
- A. G. W. Hammond (68002).
- J. Larentz (102755V).
- D. E. D. Meaker (102984V).
- D. U. Nel, DFC (102987V).
- L. H. G. Shuttleworth, DFC (1027V).
- P. E. Stableford (P.102685V).
- E. B. Woodrow (102994V).

Acting Lieutenant Colonel

- G. L. Bateman (102932V).

Majors

- E. Baden-Cross (203363V).
- R. J. Clements (102132V).
- M. E. Draper (130071V).
- S. Fuchs (202884V) (deceased).
- G. E. C. Hudson (52034V).
- E. Jones (96983V).
- H. C. Nicholas (179841V).
- E. G. White (203098V).
- P. H. Wishart (203142V).
- F. P. Wyles (203134V).

Captains

- A. M. Begg (187300V).
- G. W. Boyes (52356V).
- E. T. Brunskell (102239V).
- G. R. Connell, DFC (103604V).
- N. P. Coole (203024V).
- J. B. Davis (203154V).
- M. Geldenhuys (47928V).
- R. E. Gray (15021V).
- H. T. Hamel (203329V).
- P. Hempson (6118V).
- J. F. Nortje (47493V).
- J. Ovenstone (103159V).
- W. J. Parker (94133V).
- G. V. Parsons (202920).
- G. R. Percival (30329V).
- T. B. Phillips (203066).
- A. W. Short (P.605V).
- J. F. Smiths (P.5663V).
- W. A. R. Thorogood (34125V).
- C. R. Wallace (202936V).

Lieutenants

- J. M. G. Anderson (328517V).
- R. J. Bayford (20357V).
- W. J. Boyce (98776V).
- G. C. Bow (251515).
- A. L Bristol (100388V).
- M. S. Britz (206447V).
- J. O. Brown (208669V).
- L. H. Brown (103800V).
- A. E. Burnett (103833V).
- P. Campbell (103130V).
- H. A. F. Collie (26934V).
- D. Davidson (317463V).
- J. E. Davies (202927).
- E. D. K. Frank (329226V).
- V. Goldman (20297V).
- R. A. Harburn (207195V).
- D. J. S. Jansen Tan Rensburg (206835V).
- R. B. Kihn (542561V).
- T. Kipling (573009V).
- R. Kuttner (542609V).
- G. N. McGuire (542592V).
- D. W. MacLeod (542299V).
- E. Manne (328316V).
- I. Margowsky (206403V).
- E. P. Matthews (211727V).
- H. Matthews (328749V).
- P. Metcalf (99438V).
- G. E. Millborrow (328567V).
- H. J. Milton (52456V).
- A. Muir (74894V).
- C. W. Nunneley (328668V).
- M. W. V. Odendaal (205865V).
- H. M. Preston (208898V).
- D. Reeves (153183).
- H. Stein (223594V).
- M. J. D. Stubbs (328354V).
- T. C. L. Symmes (125324V).
- D. B. Tatters All (542496V) (deceased).
- D. H. Theron (205535V).
- P. J. Van Du Merwe (542510V).
- P.M. Van Rensburg (97769V).
- D. N. Vernon (328903V).

2nd Lieutenant

- C. B. Susskind (543190V) (deceased).

Warrant Officers

- H. De Bruiyn (29619V).
- D. J. Mahon (98452V).
- Z. C. Helps (41906V).
- P. D. Jourdan (315598V).
- R. Miles (P.4737V).

Flight Sergeants

- 32485V W. F. Coe.
- 115243 H. M. Kennedy.
- P.4575V J. G. Theron.
- 449567 C. A. Van-Bocnoue.
- P.5641V W. P. J. Van-Der-Westhuizen.

Sergeants

- 22979V W. J. Gouws.
- 28839V M. D. Marnewick.
- P.5490V G. D. Pearce.
- 231495V A. B. Scott.
- 58441V E. Wolf.

Acting Sergeant

- J. E. Ballantyne (52380V).

Corporal

- 30215V L. D. B. Robins.

Temporary Air Corporal

- 48121V D. J. De Waal.

Air Mechanics

- 579067V J. C. Carter.
- 6873V L. R. Clarke.
- 577244V B. J. Jooste.

South African Air Force (Women's Division)
Major

- M. A. Theunissen (F.46624V).

Lieutenant

- V. Venter (F.262645V).

Flight Sergeant

- F.153228V B. L. Smith.

== Royal Indian Air Force ==
Flight Lieutenants

- S. G. Deshpande (Ind/2294).
- G. Wakefield (Ind/2184).

Acting Flight Lieutenant

- M. A. Sarwate (Ind/1966).

Pilot Officer

- K. Chandra (Ind/2721).

Lance Corporal

- 1171 Gewercis Shaino.

Privates

- 1288 Benyamin Khoshaba.
- 10575 Menas Gewergis.

Non-Commissioned Engineer Follower

- Ahmed Igbal.

Civilians

- Mrs. D. Chick.
- S. W. Gray.
- D. A. Jones.
- Mohamed Pir Khan.
- Herbert Francis Nichols.
