= Rudolf Müller (pilot) =

German fighter ace and Knight's Cross recipient

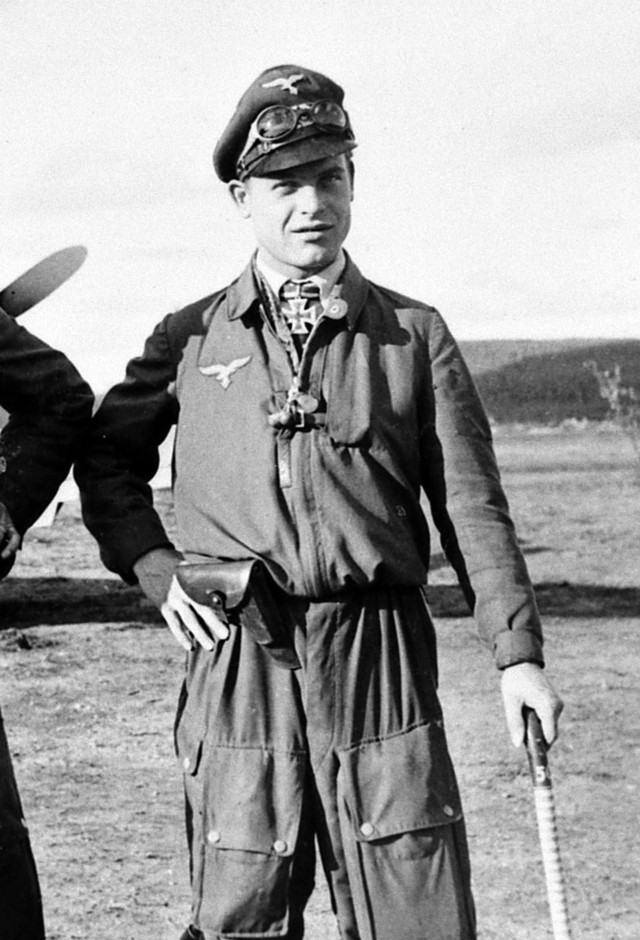
- Müller, 6./JG 5, ca. September 1942
- Born: 21 November 1920; Frankfurt, Germany
- Died: 21 October 1943 (aged 22); Temnikov, Russia
- Military career
- Allegiance: Nazi Germany
- Branch: Luftwaffe
- Service years: 1938–1943
- Rank: Oberfeldwebel (Staff Sergeant)
- Units: JG 77, JG 5
- Conflicts: World War II: Eastern Front; Western Front
- Awards: Knight's Cross of the Iron Cross

Rudolf "Rudi" Müller (21 November 1920 – 21 October 1943) was a Luftwaffe fighter ace and recipient of the Knight's Cross of the Iron Cross during World War II. The Knight's Cross of the Iron Cross, and its variants were the highest awards in the military and paramilitary forces of Nazi Germany during World War II. Müller was credited with 94 victories, though one source lists 101 victories. (Note: Toliver and Constable list Müller with 101 aerial victories while Spick lists him with 94.)

== Career ==
Müller was born on 21 November 1920 in Frankfurt am Main, at the time in the Province of Hesse-Nassau within the Weimar Republic. He joined the military service of the Luftwaffe in 1938, initially serving with the Nachrichtentruppe (signal corps). He then transferred and attended flight training. Following completion of flight and fighter pilot training, (Note: Flight training in the Luftwaffe progressed through the levels A1, A2 and B1, B2, referred to as A/B flight training. A training included theoretical and practical training in aerobatics, navigation, long-distance flights and dead-stick landings. The B courses included high-altitude flights, instrument flights, night landings and training to handle the aircraft in difficult situations.) Müller joined the Ergänzungsgruppe of Jagdgeschwader 77 (JG 77—77th Fighter Wing) in June 1941. In August, he was transferred to 1. Staffel (1st squadron) of JG 77. At the time, this squadron was commanded by Oberleutnant Horst Carganico. His first claimed victory came on 12 September 1941 when he shot down a Soviet Air Forces Polikarpov I-16 fighter.

=== War on the Arctic Front ===
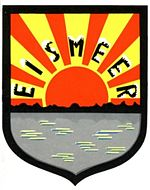
JG 5 Emblem

In January 1942, Jagdgeschwader 5 (JG 5—5th Fighter Wing) was newly created and placed under the command of Oberst Carl-Alfred Schumacher. On 3 January, I. Gruppe of JG 77 was renamed and became the I. Gruppe of JG 5. In consequence, Carganico's 1. Staffel became the newly created 1. Staffel of JG 5. On 21 March, 1. Staffel was subordinated to II. Gruppe of JG 5, commanded by Strümpell, and became the 6. Staffel of JG 5. On 23 April 1942, he became an "ace-in-a-day". That day, 6. Staffel escorted Junkers Ju 87 dive bombers from I. Gruppe of Sturzkampfgeschwader 5 and Junkers Ju 88 bombers from Kampfgeschwader 30 on a bombing mission to the Soviet airfield at Vayenga, present-day Severomorsk. The flight was intercepted by Hawker Hurricane fighters from 3 AE/2 GvSAP (Aviation Squadron of Guards Composite Aviation Regiment—Aviatsionnya Eskadrilya; Gvardeskiy Smeshannyy Aviatsionnyy Polk). In this encounter, Müller shot down Serzhant Anatoliy Semyonov and Serzhant N. F. Yepanov. Returning to the airbase Petsamo-Luostari Airfield, 6. Staffel intercepted Soviet aircraft on a mission to bomb Petsamo-Luostari Airfield. In this aerial battle, Müller shot down two Hurricanes piloted by Starshiy Leytnant I. Ya and Serzhant A. I. Chibsov from 20 GvIAP (Guards Fighter Aviation Regiment—Gvardeskiy Istrebitelny Aviatsionny Polk), and a Tupolev SB bomber piloted by Mladshiy Leytenant Golovanov from 137 SBAP (High-Speed Bomber Aviation Regiment—Skorostnoy Bombardirovochnyy Aviatsionny Polk)

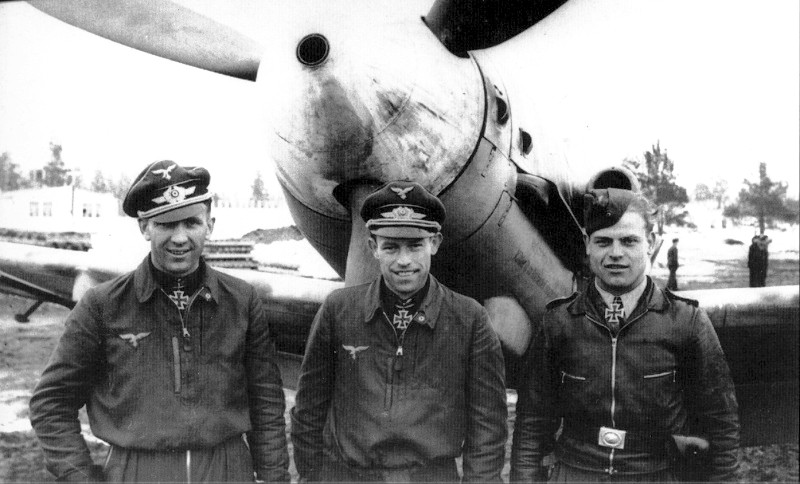
Theodor Weissenberger (left), Heinrich Ehrler (center) and Müller (right)

On 26 April, seven Petlyakov Pe-2 bombers, escorted by fighters from the 95 IAP (Fighter Aviation Regiment—Istrebitelny Aviatsionny Polk), attacked the Kirkenes Airfield. The attack force failed to inflict any damage to the airfield as five of the attackers were shot down, including two by Müller and two by Carganico.

The Allied Convoy PQ 16, consisting of 35 merchant vessels, headed from Hvalfjörður in Iceland to Murmansk from 21 to 30 May. At the same time, Convoy QP 12 with 15 freighters left Murmansk heading for Iceland. The convoys were sighted by German reconnaissance aircraft on 25 May 1942. Over the following five days, the convoys came under multiple attacks. On 30 May, JG 5 claimed 43 fighter aircraft and 7 bombers shot down. Matching these claims against Soviet records, the figures appear to be inflated. That morning at 09:20, Müller, Leutnant Heinrich Ehrler, Unteroffizier Hans Döbrich and another pilot each claimed a Hurricane fighter shot down. At the time and in the same area of this encounter, Podpolkovnik (lieutenant colonel) Boris Safonov, commander 2 GvSAP of the Soviet Naval Aviation, was shot down in his Curtiss P-40 Warhawk and killed in action.

On 13 June, Müller claimed three aerial victories over Hurricane fighters from 78 IAP, one of which was the 500th claim filed by II. Gruppe. Müller received the Knight's Cross of the Iron Cross (Ritterkreuz des Eisernen Kreuzes) on 19 June 1942 for 41 aerial victories. The presentation was made by Generaloberst Hans-Jürgen Stumpff at Petsamo, present-day Pechenga in Murmansk Oblast. On 1 July, he was awarded the Honor Goblet of the Luftwaffe (Ehrenpokal der Luftwaffe). During aerial combat near Murmashi on 21 August, his Messerschmitt Bf 109 F-4 trop (Werknummer 10073—factory number) was hit, resulting in an emergency landing at the Petsamo airfield.

By the end of September 1942, Müller was credited with 81 aircraft shot down. Müller injured his leg in a skiing accident in December that year, and after recovery was granted leave in Germany, returning to his unit in February 1943. On 8 March, Müller was carrying out a familiarization flight on the new Bf 109 G-2, which his Staffel was in the process of converting to, when the aircraft suffered an engine failure and crashed, with Müller suffering a concussion.

=== Capture and Death ===
On 19 April 1943, Müller was shot down in his Bf 109 G-2 (Werknummer 14810) by a Hurricane from 609 IAP, and was captured by Soviet forces. He was the highest-scoring German fighter pilot in the Arctic theater at the time of his capture. Müller talked freely about himself and tactics during interrogation by his captors, and as a result was taken to nearby Soviet airfields to discuss fighter tactics with Soviet pilots before being sent to a Prisoner of War camp at Krasnogorsk, Moscow Oblast. On 21 October 1943 Müller was shot during an escape attempt at Temnikov, while being moved to a camp in Mordovia. Müller was posthumously promoted to Oberfeldwebel (staff sergeant).

== Summary of career ==
=== Aerial victory claims ===
According to US historian David T. Zabecki, Müller was credited with 94 aerial victories. Spick also lists Müller with 94 aerial victories claimed in an unknown number of combat missions, all of which claimed on the Eastern Front. The authors Raymond F. Toliver and Trevor James Constable list him with 101 aerial victories. Mathews and Foreman, authors of Luftwaffe Aces — Biographies and Victory Claims, researched the German Federal Archives and states that Müller was credited with 94 aerial victories, plus one further unconfirmed claim. This figure includes 92 aerial victories on the Eastern Front and another two over the Western Allies.

Victory claims were logged to a map-reference (PQ = Planquadrat), for example "PQ 3078". The Luftwaffe grid map (Jägermeldenetz) covered all of Europe, western Russia and North Africa and was composed of rectangles measuring 15 minutes of latitude by 30 minutes of longitude, an area of about 360 square miles (930 km^{2}). These sectors were then subdivided into 36 smaller units to give a location area 3 km × 4 km (1.9 mi × 2.5 mi) in size.

Chronicle of aerial victories
This and the ♠ (Ace of spades) indicates those aerial victories which made Müller an "ace-in-a-day", a term which designates a fighter pilot who has shot down five or more airplanes in a single day. This and the ? (exclamation mark) indicates information discrepancies listed by Prien, Stemmer, Rodeike, Bock, Mombeek, Mathews, and Foreman.
Claim	Date	Time	Type	Location	Claim	Date	Time	Type	Location
– 1. Staffel of Jagdgeschwader 77 – Eastern and northern Norway — 22 June – 5 December 1941
1	12 September 1941	—	I-16		5	28 September 1941	—	Pe-2? (Note: According to Mombeek claimed as a Tupolev SB.)	
2	15 September 1941	—	DB-3		6	2 November 1941	—	SB-2	
3	17 September 1941	—	DB-3? (Note: According to Mombeek claimed as a Polikarpov I-153.)	Litsa	7	2 November 1941	—	SB-2	
4	27 September 1941	—	Hurricane		8	4 November 1941	—	I-16	
– 1. Staffel of Jagdgeschwader 5 – Southern and western Norway — 1 January – 16 March 1942
9	1 February 1942	—	Hudson		10	16 February 1942	—	Hudson	
– 6. Staffel of Jagdgeschwader 5 – Eastern Front and northern Norway, and Finland — 6 December 1941 – 31 December 1942
11? (Note: According to Mathews and Foreman this claim is unconfirmed.)	24 March 1942	18:15	Hurricane	PQ 3078; Ura-Guba	48	17 June 1942	17:30	Hurricane? (Note: According to Mombeek claimed as a I-180, a German designator for a Yakovlev Yak-7.)	8 km (5.0 mi) southeast of Murmansk
12♠	23 April 1942	—	Hurricane	vicinity of Vayenga	49	23 June 1942	—	I-16	2 km (1.2 mi) north of Murmansk
13♠	23 April 1942	—	Hurricane	vicinity of Vayenga	50	5 August 1942? (Note: According to Mombeek claimed on 4 August 1942.)	—	I-61 (MiG-3)? (Note: According to Mombeek claimed as a Polikarpov I-16.)	
14♠	23 April 1942	—	SB-2	vicinity of Luostari	51	5 August 1942?	—	Hurricane	
15♠	23 April 1942	—	Hurricane	vicinity of Luostari	52	5 August 1942?	—	Hurricane	
16♠	23 April 1942	—	Hurricane	vicinity of Luostari	53	13 August 1942	—	I-153	
17	24 April 1942	—	Hurricane		54	13 August 1942	—	I-180 (Yak-7)?	
18	26 April 1942	16:13	Pe-2	30–40 km (19–25 mi) south of Petsamo airfield 2 km (1.2 mi) west of Petsamo	55	13 August 1942	—	MiG-3	
19	26 April 1942	—	Hurricane	2 km (1.2 mi) west of Murmansk	56	21 August 1942	—	I-180 (Yak-7)	
20	28 April 1942	—	Hurricane	Litsa Bight	57	21 August 1942	—	Yak-1	
21	28 April 1942	—	Hurricane	east of the Litsa Bight	? (Note: This claim is not listed by Prien, Stemmer, Rodeike and Bock, nor by Mathews and Foreman.)	21 August 1942	—	Yak-1	
22	28 April 1942	—	Hurricane	east of the Litsa Bight	58	22 August 1942? (Note: Listed by Prien, Stemmer, Rodeike and Bock as an aerial victory with an unknown date.)	—	unknown	
23	28 April 1942	—	Hurricane	east of the Litsa Bight	59	22 August 1942?	—	unknown	
24	29 April 1942	—	Hurricane	5 km (3.1 mi) west of Litsa Bight	60	22 August 1942?	—	unknown	
25	29 April 1942	—	Hurricane	5 km (3.1 mi) west of Litsa Bight	61	25 August 1942?	—	unknown	
26	29 April 1942	—	I-153	5 km (3.1 mi) west of Litsa Bight	62	25 August 1942?	—	unknown	
27	18 May 1942	—	Hurricane	5 km (3.1 mi) west of Murmansk	63	29 August 1942?	—	unknown	
28	18 May 1942	—	Hurricane	7 km (4.3 mi) west of Murmansk	64	29 August 1942?	—	unknown	
29	18 May 1942	—	Hurricane	10 km (6.2 mi) west of Murmansk	65	2 September 1942?	—	unknown	
30	18 May 1942	—	Hurricane		66	4 September 1942?	—	unknown	
31	19 May 1942	—	Hurricane	Murmashi	67	8 September 1942	—	Hurricane	
32	19 May 1942	—	Hurricane	8 km (5.0 mi) southwest of Murmashi	68	9 September 1942	—	unknown	vicinity of Kola
33	19 May 1942	—	Hurricane	Murmashi	69	9 September 1942	—	unknown	vicinity of Kola
34	25 May 1942	—	Hurricane	Murmashi	70	9 September 1942	—	unknown	vicinity of Kola
35	26 May 1942	—	Hurricane	3 km (1.9 mi) west of Taybola	71	9 September 1942	—	unknown	vicinity of Kola
36	26 May 1942	—	Hurricane	5 km (3.1 mi) northwest of Taybola	? (Note: This claim is not listed by Prien, Stemmer, Rodeike and Bock, nor by Mombeek.)	12 September 1942	—	fighter	
37	26 May 1942	—	Hurricane	10 km (6.2 mi) west of Taybola	72	15 September 1942	—	unknown	
38	28 May 1942	—	Hurricane	2 km (1.2 mi) west of Kola	73	15 September 1942	—	unknown	
39	28 May 1942	—	P-40	5 km (3.1 mi) west of Kola	74	15 September 1942	—	unknown	
40	30 May 1942	—	Hurricane	eastern exit of the Kola Bay	75	15 September 1942	—	unknown	
41	2 June 1942	—	Hurricane	5 km (3.1 mi) west of Murmansk	76♠	27 September 1942	—	P-40	
42	2 June 1942	—	Hurricane	6 km (3.7 mi) west of Murmansk	77♠	27 September 1942	—	P-40	
43	13 June 1942	—	Hurricane	20 km (12 mi) west of Murmansk	78♠	27 September 1942	—	P-40	
44	13 June 1942	—	Hurricane	10 km (6.2 mi) west of Murmansk	79♠	27 September 1942	—	P-40	
45	13 June 1942	—	Hurricane	10 km (6.2 mi) west of Murmansk	80♠	27 September 1942	—	P-40	
46	17 June 1942	10:20	Hurricane	5 km (3.1 mi) west of Murmansk	81♠	27 September 1942	—	P-39	
47	17 June 1942	10:22	Hurricane	Murmansk	82? (Note: This claim is not listed by Mathews and Foreman.)	27 September 1942?	—	unknown	
– 6. Staffel of Jagdgeschwader 5 – Eastern Front and northern Norway, and Finland — 1 January – 21 October 1943
83	8 February 1943?	—	unknown		85? (Note: This claim is not listed by Mombeek.)	19 February 1943	—	Hurricane	
83	8 February 1943?	—	unknown		86?	19 February 1943	—	Hurricane	
84	17 February 1943	—	Hurricane		87?	21 February 1943	—	LaGG-3	
According to Prien, Stemmer, Rodeike and Bock, Müller claimed five undocumented aerial victories in February to March 1943. Some of these claims are also not listed by Mombeek or by Mathews and Foreman.
93	13 March 1943	—	P-39		94	13 March 1943	—	P-39	

=== Awards ===
- Iron Cross (1939) 2nd and 1st Class
- Knight's Cross of the Iron Cross on 19 June 1942 as Feldwebel and pilot in the 6./Jagdgeschwader 5
- Honor Goblet of the Luftwaffe on 1 July 1942 as Unteroffizier and pilot
- German Cross in Gold on 27 May 1943 as Feldwebel in the 6./Jagdgeschwader 5 (Note: Obermaier lists Müller with a presentation date of 8 June 1942.)
