= Franz Dörr =

German World War II fighter pilot

- Born: 10 February 1913; Mannheim
- Died: 13 October 1972 (aged 59); Konstanz
- Military career
- Allegiance: Nazi Germany
- Branch: Luftwaffe
- Rank: Hauptmann (captain)
- Units: JG 3, JG 5
- Conflicts: See battles World War II: Eastern Front; Arctic convoys; Petsamo–Kirkenes Offensive; Operation Catechism
- Awards: Knight's Cross of the Iron Cross

Franz Dörr (10 February 1913 – 13 October 1972) was a German Luftwaffe military aviator and fighter ace during World War II. He is credited with 128 aerial victories achieved in 437 combat missions, becoming an "ace-in-a-day" on nine separate occasions. All of his aerial victories were claimed on the Eastern Front.

Born in Mannheim, Dörr grew up in the Weimar Republic and Nazi Germany. Following flight training, he served as a reconnaissance pilot in the Invasion of Poland and Battle of France. In late 1941, he served with Jagdgeschwader 5 (JG 5—5th Fighter Wing) which was moved near the Arctic Ocean in the northern sector of the Eastern Front. He claimed his first aerial victory on 9 May 1942. In September 1943, Dörr was appointed squadron leader of 7. Staffel (7th squadron) of JG 5 and in August 1944, he was given command of III. Gruppe (3rd group) of JG 5. Dörr was awarded the Knight's Cross of the Iron Cross on 19 August 1944 after 95 aerial victories claimed. Following the loss of the German battleship Tirpitz on 12 November 1944, Dörr was court-martialled but was acquitted from all charges. He died on 13 October 1972 in Konstanz.

== Biography ==
Dörr was born on 10 February 1913 in Mannheim, at the time in the Grand Duchy of Baden of the German Empire. During Invasion of Poland and Battle of France, Dörr served as a reconnaissance pilot. In spring 1941, he was transferred to 1.(Erg.)/Jagdgeschwader 3 (JG 3—3rd Fighter Wing), based in the Netherlands. The Ergänzungsjagdgruppe, a replacement training group, had been formed in April 1941 at Kraków. The unit was formed with two squadrons and commanded by Major Alfred Müller. In July, the Ergänzungsjagdgruppe was ordered to the Netherlands, escorting German shipping. In late August, the unit was ordered to an airfield near Esbjerg, Denmark. In addition to its training role, its mission was to provide air defense for Jutland's western coast. To achieve this, a Schwarm, a flight of four to six aircraft, from 1. Staffel (1st squadron), under the command of Dörr, was based at a forward airfield at Rømø.

=== War on the Arctic Front ===
On 29 December 1941, Ergänzungsjagdgruppe 3 received the order from the Oberkommando der Luftwaffe (OKL) that it would be detached from JG 3 on 31 December and was renamed to 7. Staffel (7th squadron) of Jagdgeschwader 5 (JG 5—5th Fighter Wing) and subordinated as an autonomous Staffel to Jagdfliegerführer Norwegen. On 24 April, 7. Staffel arrived in Pechenga, also referred to as Petsamo, where it was subordinated to III. Gruppe (3rd group) of JG 5 under the command of Hauptmann (Captain) Günther Scholz. On 9 May 1942, 7. Staffel took off at 18:00 to patrol the front along the Zapadnaya Litsa River. Approximately 25 kilometers (16 miles) east of Pechenga, the flight encountered eight Hawker Hurricane and six Curtiss P-40 Kittyhawk fighters flying at low altitude. In this engagement, the Germans claimed two Hurricanes shot down, including one by Dörr. According to Soviet records, only one Hurricane was lost, its pilot Senior Lieutenant Lewtschuk from 197 IAP (197th Fighter Aviation Regiment—Istrebitelny Aviatsionny Polk) bailed out. On 15 May on a fighter escort mission to Murmansk, Dörr claimed his second aerial victory when he shot down a Hurricane. On 19 July, Dörr again participated in a fighter escort mission for seven Junkers Ju 87 dive bombers and five Junkers Ju 88 bombers attacking Murmansk. The flight was intercepted by Yakovlev Yak-1 fighters from 20 IAP (20th Fighter Aviation Regiment). These were the first Yak-1 fighters to appear in this theatre of operations. In the resulting aerial combat, Dörr claimed one of the fighters shot down, which he had identified as a Curtiss P-40 Warhawk.

On 12 July 1943, Dörr lost his Messerschmitt Bf 109 G-2 (Werknummer 13600—factory number) over sea, officially due to engine trouble. Mombeek speculates that in fact the aircraft was lost in a mid-air collision with another Bf 109 G-2 piloted by Unteroffizier Richard Steinbach. Both pilots bailed out 12 kilometers (7.5 miles) south of Vardø and were picked up by a Räumboot and then flown in a Dornier Do 24 to a hospital at Vardø. Shortly after, Dörr was awarded the Iron Cross 2nd Class (Eisernes Kreuz zweiter Klasse) and the Iron Cross 1st Class (Eisernes Kreuz erster Klasse) following his eighth victory claimed on 23 January 1943.

=== Squadron leader ===
Dörr claimed his 20th victory on 18 August 1943. He was appointed Staffelkapitän (squadron leader) of 7. Staffel of JG 5 on 1 September 1943. Dörr succeeded Oberleutnant Theodor Weissenberger in this position, who was given command of 6. Staffel. JG 5 flew multiple missions from Pechenga and Kirkenes in protection of a German convoy on 14 September. At 17:03, a Rotte of Bf 109 G-2s sighted and reported an enemy formation consisting of Douglas A-20 Havoc, also known as Boston bombers, Ilyushin Il-2 ground attack aircraft, as well as Bell P-39 Airacobra and Hurricane fighters. At 18:15, 9. Staffel was scrambled at Pechenga and 5. Staffel at Svartnes. A bit later, further Bf 109s from 4., 7. and 5. Staffel took off. The Germans intercepted the Soviet formation east of Ekkerøy over the Varangerfjord. In this aerial engagement, Dörr claimed the destruction of two Il-2s and one P-40 fighter.

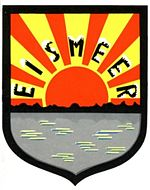
JG 5 Emblem

On 25 November, following ten days of relative quiet, the Soviet Air Forces conducted a coordinated attack on Titovka, and the airfields Høybuktmoen at Kirkenes and Luostari near Pechenga. Titovka was attacked by sixteen Il-2s and six P-40s, escorted by six Yak-1 and four Yakovlev Yak-9 fighters. Høybuktmoen was hit by twelve Petlyakov Pe-2 escorted by twelve P-39s and six Yak-9. The Luostari airfield was struck by sixteen Il-2 and six P-40, protected by fourteen Yak-1 and six Hurricanes. That day, Dörr claimed a P-40 and an Il-2 ground attack aircraft, taking his total to 31 aerial victories. He was awarded the German Cross in Gold (Deutsches Kreuz in Gold) on 20 March 1944.

Flying out of Pechenga on 2 April 1944, Dörr claimed two Yak-9 fighters were shot down. These were his 32nd and 33rd aerial victories. Parts of III. Gruppe were ordered to relocate from Pechenga to Svartnes at 17:17 on 25 May 1944. At 21:00, 19 Bf 109s under the leadership of Gruppenkommandeur (Group Commander) Major (Major) Heinrich Ehrler were scrambled from Svartnes to fend off approximately 80 Soviet aircraft attacking a German convoy. During this encounter, III. Gruppe claimed 33 aerial victories, including twenty "Boston" bombers, eight P-40s and five P-39s. However, Soviet records only account for five losses that day. Dörr claimed four aerial victories in this aerial combat. The next day, Ehrler again led 19 Bf 109s from III. Gruppe in defense of the German convoy. This time the Germans reported combat with approximately 100 Soviet aircraft and claimed 40 aerial victories, among them five by Dörr. Again, Soviet records do not match this figure; they document the loss of nine aircraft.

On 1 June 1944, 9. Staffel was officially detached from III. Gruppe and subordinated to II. Gruppe which had left Finland in April 1944 and fought in Reichsverteidigung (Defense of the Reich). Not every pilot of 9. Staffel was impacted by this order. Some pilots stayed in Pechenga and formed a newly created Kommandostaffel (commando squadron), later renamed to Eismeerstaffel (Arctic Sea squadron).

=== Group commander ===
On 1 August, Geschwaderkommodore (Wing Commander) of JG 5, Oberstleutnant Scholz was given the position of Jagdfliegerführer Norwegen. In consequence of this decision, Major Ehrler was appointed the new Geschwaderkommodore and Dörr replaced Ehrler as Gruppenkommandeur of III. Gruppe while Leutnant Walter Schuck was given command of 7. Staffel, redesignated to 10. Staffel on 6 August 1944.

On 17 August, eight P-40 fighter aircraft of the 6 IAD (Istrebitel'naya Aviatsionnaya Diviziya—Fighter Aviation Division), accompanied by fourteen P-39 fighter aircraft, attacked the Luostari/Pechenga airfield. In parallel, further Soviet aircraft, including a number of Boston bombers, attacked the harbor at Kirkenes. First elements of III. Gruppe were scrambled at 09:25, resulting in various aerial encounters. In this combat, Dörr claimed three victories. Two days later, Dörr was awarded the Knight's Cross of the Iron Cross (Ritterkreuz des Eisernen Kreuzes) for 95 aerial victories and promoted to Hauptmann. The presentation of the Knight's Cross was made by Geschwaderkommodore Ehrler. He claimed six further aircraft shot down on 23 August 1944, among them his 100th victory, taking his total to 106 aerial victories. He was the 88th Luftwaffe pilot to achieve the century mark.

In October 1944, Dörr claimed to have shot down 22 Russian aircraft, including six on 9 October and five on 21 October. On 9 October, the XIX. Gebirgs-Armeekorps was on the retreat and threatened by encirclement from Soviet forces that breached the German defenses south of the Petsamo (Pechenga) airfield during the Petsamo–Kirkenes Offensive. That day, Dörr led III. Gruppe and claimed six aerial victories.

=== Sinking of the Tirpitz ===
On 12 November 1944 the RAF sank the battleship Tirpitz. Avro Lancaster bombers from No. 617 and No. 9 squadrons were sent to Håkøya, a little west of Tromsø, where the Tirpitz was based. At the time, JG 5 was based at the Bardufoss airfield with 12 operational Focke-Wulf Fw 190 A-3s. Neither Dörr nor his Geschwaderkommodore Ehrler knew the exact location of the battleship and were told she was based near Tromsø. At no time was the Geschwaderkommodore informed his unit's sole responsibility was the protection of the ship.

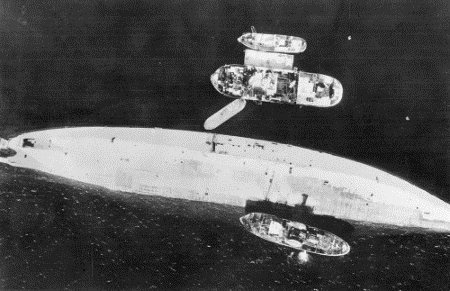
Tirpitz capsized after Operation Catechism.

The command and control center at Bardufoss was informed shortly before 08:00 that three Lancasters had been sighted at 07:39 in the vicinity of Mosjøen heading east. Shortly later, a second bulletin stated that a further Lancaster was sighted heading northeast. The reason for this delay in communication was that the message had been routed from Mosjøen to Fauske and then to the Luftwaffe headquarters at Narvik. The communication officer in charge, Leutnant Leo Beniers, immediately forwarded this information to Tromsø. At 08:18 the Luftwaffe fighter control center was informed, which issued an air alarm for the area of Bodø. At 08:34 further four Lancasters were reported but plotted in the wrong Planquadrat (PQ—grid reference) of the Luftwaffe grid map (Jägermeldenetz). Due to this error, neither Ehrler nor Dörr was informed of the approaching bombers.

That day, Ehrler had preemptively ordered 9. Staffel of JG 5 at Bardufoss airfield on three-minute readiness while the Kommandostaffel was still undergoing training and had been placed on 15-minute readiness. Ehrler, who had planned to fly to Alta, entered his command post at 08:50, unaware of the unfolding events. As he was just about to leave the command post, Tirpitz signaled that they heard aircraft engine noise of unknown origin and altitude; Tirpitz did not report approaching enemy bombers. At 09:18, Ehrler ordered cockpit readiness for 9. Staffel and placed the Kommandostaffel on three-minute readiness. The situation remained unclear for Ehrler until 09:21–09:23 when a second aircraft noise message arrived. He then at 09:23 sounded the alarm and scrambled 9. Staffel. In parallel, Dörr, who was alarmed by the fighters taking off, arrived at the command post and took charge of the Kommandostaffel. Ehrler was airborne at 09:25 during the takeoff of 9. Staffel was delayed by five minutes due to a landing Junkers Ju 52. Adding to the confusion, when the British aircraft were detected by the German air defence staff at Tromsø, they asked the airfield command if any fighter aircraft were ready for takeoff. The question was affirmed, but the JG 5 staff thought the enquiry concerned the flight to Alta. The naval officers on board Tirpitz were notified Erhler was airborne before the British began their attack at 09:38. Dörr, who was in the command post and waited until further information became available, led the Kommandostaffel and took off at 09:36 heading for Tromsø. According to Forsgren, Dörr may have intercepted and shot down an unidentified aircraft 20 kilometers (12 miles) northeast of Bardufoss that day. This aircraft may have been a Soviet Supermarine Spitfire aerial reconnaissance aircraft.

When it finally became clear that the target was the Tirpitz, it was too late for the fighters to intercept, and the Tirpitz was destroyed with much loss of life. Neither 9. Staffel nor the Kommandostaffel found the bombers and returned to Bardufoss airfield. Dörr and Ehrler were both made responsible for the loss and tried before the Reichskriegsgericht on 17, 18 and 20 December 1944. While Ehrler was found guilty, Dörr was acquitted from all charges. He died on 13 October 1972 in Konstanz, West Germany.

== Summary of career ==
=== Aerial victory claims ===
According to US historian David T. Zabecki, Dörr was credited with 128 aerial victories. Obermaier and Spick also list Dörr with 128 victories claimed in 437 combat missions and a mission-to-claim ratio of 3.41. Mathews and Foreman, authors of Luftwaffe Aces — Biographies and Victory Claims, researched the German Federal Archives and found records for 122 aerial victory claims, all of which claimed on the Eastern Front.

Chronicle of aerial victories
This and the ♠ (Ace of spades) indicates those aerial victories which made Dörr an "ace-in-a-day", a term which designates a fighter pilot who has shot down five or more airplanes in a single day. This and the ? (question mark) indicates information discrepancies listed by Mombeek, Mathews and Foreman.
Claim	Date	Time	Type	Location	Claim	Date	Time	Type	Location
– 7. Staffel of Jagdgeschwader 5 –
1	9 May 1942	18:20	Hurricane	25 km (16 mi) east of Pechenga	46	25 May 1944	21:45	P-40	25 km (16 mi) north-northeast of Berlevåg
2	15 May 1942	18:11	Hurricane	2 km (1.2 mi) north of Murmansk	47	25 May 1944	21:49	Boston	25 km (16 mi) north-northeast of Berlevåg
3	28 May 1942	21:38	Hurricane	east of Pechenga airfield	48	25 May 1944	21:50	Boston	25 km (16 mi) north-northeast of Berlevåg
4	19 July 1942	10:03	P-40	6 km (3.7 mi) southwest of Shonguy airfield	49	25 May 1944	21:52	P-39	10 km (6.2 mi) north-northeast of Berlevåg
5	9 September 1942	10:39	P-40	southeast of Warlamovo	50♠	26 May 1944	05:01	Boston	14 km (8.7 mi) north of Hamningberg
6	31 December 1942	10:45	P-40	15 km (9.3 mi) north of Murmansk	51♠	26 May 1944	05:02	Boston	16 km (9.9 mi) northeast of Hamningberg
7	23 January 1943	12:02	Pe-2	30 km (19 mi) east of Vadsø	52♠	26 May 1944	05:02? (Note: According to Mathews and Foreman at 05:04.)	P-39	15 km (9.3 mi) east of Hamningberg
8	23 January 1943	12:07	Pe-2	35 km (22 mi) east of Vadsø	53♠	26 May 1944	05:06	P-39	14 km (8.7 mi) east of Hamningberg
9	5 February 1943	12:10	Pe-2	northwestern corner of Poluostrov Rybachiy	54♠	26 May 1944	05:13	Boston	17 km (11 mi) northeast of Vardø
10	13 March 1943	12:02	Hurricane	15–20 km (9.3–12.4 mi) northwest of Poluostrov Rybachiy	55	15 June 1944	03:06	P-40	3 km (1.9 mi) east of Heinäsaari
11	29 April 1943	03:41	P-39	10 km (6.2 mi) southwest of Murmashi	56	15 June 1944	19:16? (Note: According to Mathews and Foreman at 19:11.)	Il-2	6 km (3.7 mi) north-northeast of Pechenga fjord
12	4 July 1943	22:09	Boston	13 km (8.1 mi) northwest of Pummanki bight	57	15 June 1944	19:18? (Note: According to Mathews and Foreman at 19:16.)	Il-2	7 km (4.3 mi) west of Pummanki
13	22 July 1943	23:01	Hurricane	15 km (9.3 mi) west of Pummanki bight	58	15 June 1944	19:23	P-40	9 km (5.6 mi) north-northeast of Pechenga fjord
14	18 August 1943	12:32	P-39	5 km (3.1 mi) west of Eyna Guba	59♠	17 June 1944	07:47	P-40	12 km (7.5 mi) northeast of Vardø
15	18 August 1943	14:44	P-39	5 km (3.1 mi) east of Eyna Guba	60♠	17 June 1944	07:48	P-40	12 km (7.5 mi) northeast of Vardø
16	18 August 1943	14:53	P-40	12 km (7.5 mi) east of Eyna Guba	61♠	17 June 1944	08:04	Boston	10 km (6.2 mi) east of Svartnes
17	23 August 1943	04:49	Pe-2	little Poluostrov Rybachiy	62♠	17 June 1944	08:05	P-39	18 km (11 mi) east of Svartnes
18	23 August 1943	04:58	P-40	7 km (4.3 mi) west of Navolok airfield	63♠	17 June 1944	21:28	P-40	13 km (8.1 mi) north of Kirkenes
19	28 August 1943	12:34	Hurricane	northwestern tip of Poluostrov Rybachiy	64♠	17 June 1944	21:31	P-40	17 km (11 mi) north of Taarnet
20	2 September 1943	17:39	P-40	20 km (12 mi) northwest of Pummanki bight	65♠	17 June 1944	21:33	P-40	18 km (11 mi) north of Taarnet
21	14 September 1943	18:38	Il-2	30 km (19 mi) northwest of Pechenga bight	66♠	17 June 1944	21:35	P-39	20 km (12 mi) northeast of Taarnet
22	14 September 1943	18:41	Il-2	5 km (3.1 mi) south of Heinäsaari island	67♠	27 June 1944	16:42	Boston	10 km (6.2 mi) northeast of Kirkenes
23	14 September 1943	18:49	P-40	8 km (5.0 mi) northeast of Kutowara	68♠	27 June 1944	16:43	Boston	12 km (7.5 mi) north-northeast of Kirkenes
24	18 September 1943	12:06	Pe-2	western Motka bight	69♠	27 June 1944	16:45	Yak-9	31 km (19 mi) east-northeast of Kirkenes
25	13 October 1943	13:06	Hampden	10 km (6.2 mi) southeast of Kiberg	70♠	27 June 1944	16:47	P-39	27 km (17 mi) northeast of Kirkenes
26	13 October 1943	13:10	P-39	25 km (16 mi) southeast of Kiberg	71♠	27 June 1944	23:59	Boston	6 km (3.7 mi) northeast of Kirkenes
27	19 October 1943	14:37	Il-2	25 km (16 mi) northwest of Poluostrov Rybachiy	72♠	27 June 1944	24:00	Boston	9 km (5.6 mi) east-northeast of Kirkenes
28	19 October 1943	14:40	P-40	12 km (7.5 mi) north-northwestern tip of Poluostrov Rybachiy	73♠	28 June 1944	00:07	P-39	36 km (22 mi) east-northeast of Kirkenes
29	3 November 1943	13:40	P-51	25 km (16 mi) southeast of Cap Kekurskij	74♠	28 June 1944	00:10	P-40	33 km (21 mi) east-northeast of Kirkenes
30	25 November 1943	11:58	Il-2	3 km (1.9 mi) southeast of lake Pou-Jawr	75♠	28 June 1944	00:12	P-40	34 km (21 mi) east-northeast of Kirkenes
31	25 November 1943	12:02	P-40	20 km (12 mi) west of Murmansk	76♠	28 June 1944	03:49	P-39	10 km (6.2 mi) southwest of Heinäsaari
32	2 April 1944	16:41	Yak-9	45 km (28 mi) west of Murmansk	77♠	28 June 1944	03:50	P-39? (Note: According to Mathews and Foreman claimed as a Yakovlev Yak-9.)	17 km (11 mi) southwest of Heinäsaari
33	2 April 1944	16:43	Yak-9	36 km (22 mi) west of Kola railroad station	78♠	28 June 1944	03:58	P-39	17 km (11 mi) north-northwest of Heinäsaari
34	12 April 1944	14:20	Yak-9	5 km (3.1 mi) north of Ara	79♠	4 July 1944	19:14	Boston	12 km (7.5 mi) north-northeast of Kirkenes
35	17 April 1944	08:43	P-40	northern tip of little Poluostrov Rybachiy	80♠	4 July 1944	19:16	Boston	12 km (7.5 mi) northeast of Kirkenes
36	23 April 1944	10:35	P-40	5 km (3.1 mi) northeast of Vardø	81♠	4 July 1944	19:18	P-40	24 km (15 mi) northeast of Kirkenes
37	23 April 1944	10:42	P-40	8 km (5.0 mi) northeast of Vardø	82♠	4 July 1944	19:20	P-40	17 km (11 mi) northeast of Kirkenes
38	23 April 1944	10:46	Il-2	5 km (3.1 mi) southeast of Vardø	83♠	4 July 1944	19:24	Yak-9	15 km (9.3 mi) southeast of Elvenes
39♠	16 May 1944	19:02	Il-2	27 km (17 mi) north-northwest of Vayda-Guba	84	17 July 1944	18:36	P-39	8 km (5.0 mi) east of Elvenes
40♠	16 May 1944	19:16	P-39	27 km (17 mi) north of Vayda-Guba	85	17 July 1944	18:55	Boston	12 km (7.5 mi) north of Kikenes
41♠	16 May 1944	19:17	P-39	20 km (12 mi) north-northeast of Vayda-Guba	86	17 July 1944	18:57	Yak-9	4 km (2.5 mi) north of Kirkenes
42♠	16 May 1944	21:44	Boston	6 km (3.7 mi) south-southeast of Kralnes	87	17 July 1944	18:58	Yak-9	5 km (3.1 mi) northeast of Kirkenes
43♠	16 May 1944	21:45	Boston	12 km (7.5 mi) south of Kralnes	88	21 July 1944	02:08	P-40	33 km (21 mi) northeast of Hamningberg
44♠	16 May 1944	21:47	Il-2	24 km (15 mi) east-southeast of Ekkero	89	28 July 1944	12:50	P-40	12 km (7.5 mi) southeast of Bolschaja-Liza
45♠	16 May 1944	21:48	P-39	23 km (14 mi) south of Kiberg	90	28 July 1944	12:51	P-39	16 km (9.9 mi) southeast of Bolschaja-Liza
– III. Gruppe of Jagdgeschwader 5 –
91	17 August 1944	09:41	P-39	35 km (22 mi) east-northeast of Salmiyarvi	107♠	9 October 1944	14:51	P-39	40 km (25 mi) southeast of Pechenga
92	17 August 1944	10:08	Boston	9 km (5.6 mi) north-northeast of Kirkenes	108	12 October 1944	11:30	Il-2	8 km (5.0 mi) northeast of Kirkenes
93	17 August 1944	10:10	Boston	34 km (21 mi) east-northeast of Kirkenes	109	12 October 1944	11:33	Il-2	18 km (11 mi) east-southeast of Kirkenes
94♠	23 August 1944	11:45	P-40	20 km (12 mi) southwest of Pechenga airfield	110	12 October 1944	11:34	P-39	27 km (17 mi) southeast of Kirkenes
95♠	23 August 1944	12:02	P-39	20 km (12 mi) northeast of Kirkenes	111	16 October 1944	13:02	Il-2	40 km (25 mi) north-northeast of Kirkenes
96♠	23 August 1944	12:04	P-39	28 km (17 mi) northeast of Kirkenes	112	16 October 1944	13:03	Il-2	39 km (24 mi) north-northeast of Kirkenes
97♠	23 August 1944	12:09	Boston	25 km (16 mi) east of Vadsø	113	16 October 1944	13:04	P-39	33 km (21 mi) north-northeast of Kirkenes
98♠	23 August 1944	12:56	P-39	25 km (16 mi) north of Pechenga fjord	114	17 October 1944	07:54	Il-2	14 km (8.7 mi) northeast of Kirkenes
99♠	23 August 1944	13:00	P-39	40 km (25 mi) north of Pechenga fjord	115	17 October 1944	07:55	Il-2	14 km (8.7 mi) northeast of Kirkenes
100♠	23 August 1944	13:02	P-39	32 km (20 mi) north of Pechenga fjord	116	20 October 1944	12:50	P-39	35 km (22 mi) southeast of Kirkenes
101	8 October 1944	08:22	P-39	27 km (17 mi) southeast of Pechenga airfield	117	20 October 1944	12:52	P-39	13 km (8.1 mi) east-southeast of Kirkenes
102♠	9 October 1944	08:43	P-39	28 km (17 mi) southeast of Pechenga airfield	118♠	21 October 1944	10:40	P-39	10 km (6.2 mi) east-southeast of Kirkenes
103♠	9 October 1944	08:46	P-39	27 km (17 mi) southeast of Pechenga airfield	119♠	21 October 1944	10:40	Boston	8 km (5.0 mi) southeast of Kirkenes
104♠	9 October 1944	08:52	Yak-9	38 km (24 mi) southeast of Pechenga	120♠	21 October 1944	10:41	Boston	11 km (6.8 mi) east of Kirkenes
105♠	9 October 1944	09:58	Pe-2	33 km (21 mi) southeast of Pechenga	121♠	21 October 1944	10:45	Il-2	11 km (6.8 mi) east-southeast of Kirkenes
106♠	9 October 1944	09:59	Pe-2	35 km (22 mi) southeast of Pechenga	122♠	21 October 1944	10:47	P-39	11 km (6.8 mi) east-southeast of Kirkenes

=== Awards ===
- Iron Cross (1939) 2nd and 1st Class
- Honor Goblet of the Luftwaffe on 28 February 1944 as Leutnant and pilot
- German Cross in Gold on 20 March 1944 as Leutnant in the 7./Jagdgeschwader 5
- Knight's Cross of the Iron Cross on 19 August 1944 as Hauptmann and Gruppenkommandeur of the III./Jagdgeschwader 5 (Note: According to Scherzer as Oberleutnant and Staffelkapitän of the 7./Jagdgeschwader 5.)
