= Horst Carganico =

German fighter ace and Knight's Cross recipient (1917–1944)

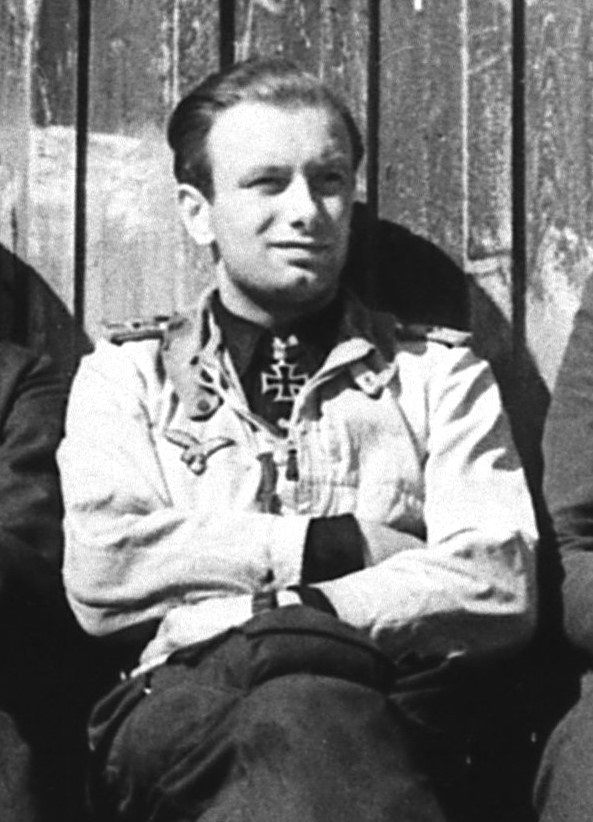
- Carganico, II. JG 5, 1942
- Born: 27 September 1917; Breslau, Lower Silesia, Province of Silesia, Kingdom of Prussia, German Empire
- Died: 27 May 1944 (aged 26); Chevry, French State
- Cause of death: Killed in action
- Burial place: Waldfriedhof Zehlendorf
- Military career
- Allegiance: Nazi Germany
- Branch: Luftwaffe
- Service years: 1937–1944
- Rank: Major (major)
- Unit: JG 5
- Commands: II./JG 5 I./JG 5
- Conflicts: See battles World War II: Operation Weserübung; Norwegian Campaign; Operation Barbarossa; Defense of the Reich †
- Awards: Knight's Cross of the Iron Cross

Horst Carganico (27 September 1917 – 27 May 1944) was a German Luftwaffe military aviator and fighter ace during World War II. He is credited with 60 aerial victories achieved in over 600 combat missions. This figure includes 54 aerial victories on the Eastern Front, and further six victories over the Western Allies.

Born in Breslau, Carganico grew up in the Weimar Republic and Nazi Germany. He joined the military service in the Luftwaffe in 1937. Following flight training, he was posted to Jagdgeschwader 1 (JG 1—1st Fighter Wing). In April 1940, he became Adjutant of II. Gruppe (2nd group) of Jagdgeschwader 77 (JG 77—77th Fighter Wing), serving in Norway. He claimed his initial victory on 21 June 1940. Following his 27th aerial victory, he was awarded the Knight's Cross of the Iron Cross on 25 September 1941. Carganico commanded the II. Gruppe of Jagdgeschwader 5 (JG 5—5th Fighter Wing) and later I. Gruppe of JG 5 fighting in Defense of the Reich. On 27 May 1944, he was killed in action when his aircraft hit high tension cables while attempting a forced landing.

== Career ==
Carganico was born on 27 September 1917 in Breslau in the Kingdom of Prussia of the German Empire, present-day Wrocław in western Poland. His father was Viktor Carganico, a World War I Luftstreitkräfte pilot officer who later raised to the rank of Generalmajor in the World War II Luftwaffe. He joined the Luftwaffe in 1937 and attended pilot school at Berlin-Johannisthal. At the outbreak of World War II Carganico was Technical Officer with the staff of Jagdgeschwader 1 (JG 1—1st Fighter Wing). In April 1940, he served with II. Gruppe (2nd group) of Jagdgeschwader 77 (JG 77—77th Fighter Wing). During Operation Weserübung (9 April – 10 June 1940), the German assault on Denmark and Norway, Carganico served as adjutant to Hauptmann Karl Hentschel, the commanding officer of II. Gruppe.

On 8 June, the German battleship Scharnhorst was damaged in combat with the British aircraft carrier Glorious and the two escorting destroyers Ardent and Acasta. Scharnhorst was taken to Trondheim for temporary repairs. Preliminary repairs were completed by 20 June, which permitted the ship to return to Germany. The following day, the Royal Air Force (RAF) launched an aerial attack on Scharnhorst. In defense of attacks against Scharnhorst, II. Gruppe flew multiple escort missions from Stavanger-Sola. Between 16:00 and 18:00, the Gruppe engaged RAF bombers and torpedo bombers over the German ships. In this encounter, Carganico claimed the destruction of a Bristol Beaufort torpedo bomber, his first aerial victory. On 9 July, RAF bombers attacked Stavanger-Sola. The bombers were intercepted by fighters from II. Gruppe and Carganico shot down two Bristol Blenheim bombers.

Carganico was promoted to Oberleutnant (first lieutenant) on 1 September. He claimed his fourth aerial victory on 14 October over a Lockheed Hudson aircraft. On 9 November, II. Gruppe of JG 77 left Norway and headed to Aalborg Airfield and then to the airfield Brest-Süd, present-day BAN Lanvéoc-Poulmic, at the Roadstead of Brest in northwestern France by 23 November. Patrolling the French coast, Carganico claimed his fifth victory on 30 November over a Blenheim bomber.

=== Squadron leader ===
On 1 February 1941, a new I. Gruppe of JG 77 was created under the command of Hauptmann Walter Grommes. This unit was based at Stavanger-Sola and was tasked with providing fighter escort for German shipping on the southern and western Norwegian coast. Command of 1. Staffel (1st squadron) of JG 77 was given to Oberleutnant Carganico who had been transferred. As a commander, authors Bergström and Mikhailov characterize Carganico as a hard-core Nazi, unsympathetic and ambitious. On 24 May, Carganico claimed his sixth aerial victory when he shot down Blenheim bomber L9267 from No. 114 Squadron. On 4 June, 1. Staffel was detached from the Gruppe and relocated to Kirkenes Airfield in preparation of Operation Barbarossa, the German invasion of the Soviet Union. In northern Norway, 1. Staffel became part of IV. Gruppe of JG 77 which in September was referred to as Jagdgruppe z.b.V. Petsamo (zur besonderen Verwendung—for special deployment) and headed by Major Hennig Strümpell.

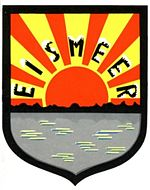
JG 5 Emblem

German forces launched Operation Barbarossa on 22 June 1941. On 25 June, the Staffel moved to Petsamo-Luostari as part of Operation Silver Fox. During the following weeks, Carganico claimed further aerial victories, not all of which can be exactly dated. On 29 June, a flight from 1. Staffel intercepted eight Beriev MBR-2 flying boats from 118 RAP (Radzvedyvatel'nyy Aviatsionnyy Polk—Reconnaissance Aviation Regiment). They were returning from a bombing mission to Liinakhamari. Three MBR-2 flying boats were shot down, two by Carganico. The 2. Gebirgs Division (2nd Mountain Division) attempted to cross the Zapadnaya Litsa on 13 July. In support of this attack, JG 77 flew a number of combat air patrols. Attacking the Soviet airfield at Shonguy, Carganico claimed the destruction of a Polikarpov I-16 fighter. Following his 27th aerial victory claimed, he was awarded the Knight's Cross of the Iron Cross (Ritterkreuz des Eisernen Kreuzes) on 25 September 1941. He was the second recipient of the Knight's Cross to receive this distinction on the Arctic Front. The presentation was made by Generaloberst Hans-Jürgen Stumpff, the commander of Luftflotte 5 (5th Air Fleet), at Petsamo.

In January 1942, Jagdgeschwader 5 (JG 5—5th Fighter Wing) was newly created and placed under the command of Oberst Carl-Alfred Schumacher. On 3 January, I. Gruppe of JG 77 was renamed and became the I. Gruppe of JG 5. In consequence, Carganico's 1. Staffel became the newly created 1. Staffel of JG 5. On 21 March, 1. Staffel was subordinated to II. Gruppe of JG 5, commanded by Strümpell, and became the 6. Staffel of JG 5. On 26 April, seven Petlyakov Pe-2 bombers, escorted by fighters from the 95 IAP (Istrebitelny Aviatsionny Polk—Fighter Aviation Regiment), attacked the Kirkenes Airfield. The attack force failed to inflict any damage to the airfield as five of the attackers were shot down, including two by Carganico and two by Unteroffizier Rudolf Müller. Two days later, 6. Staffel encountered Hurricane fighters from 2 GvSAP (Gvardeyskiy Smeshannyy Aviatsionnyy Polk—Guards Composite Aviation Regiment) over the Motovsky Gulf. 2 GvSAP lost three fighters in this engagement plus two further Hurricanes were severely damaged. German pilots claimed nine aerial victories, including two by Carganico.

=== Group commander ===
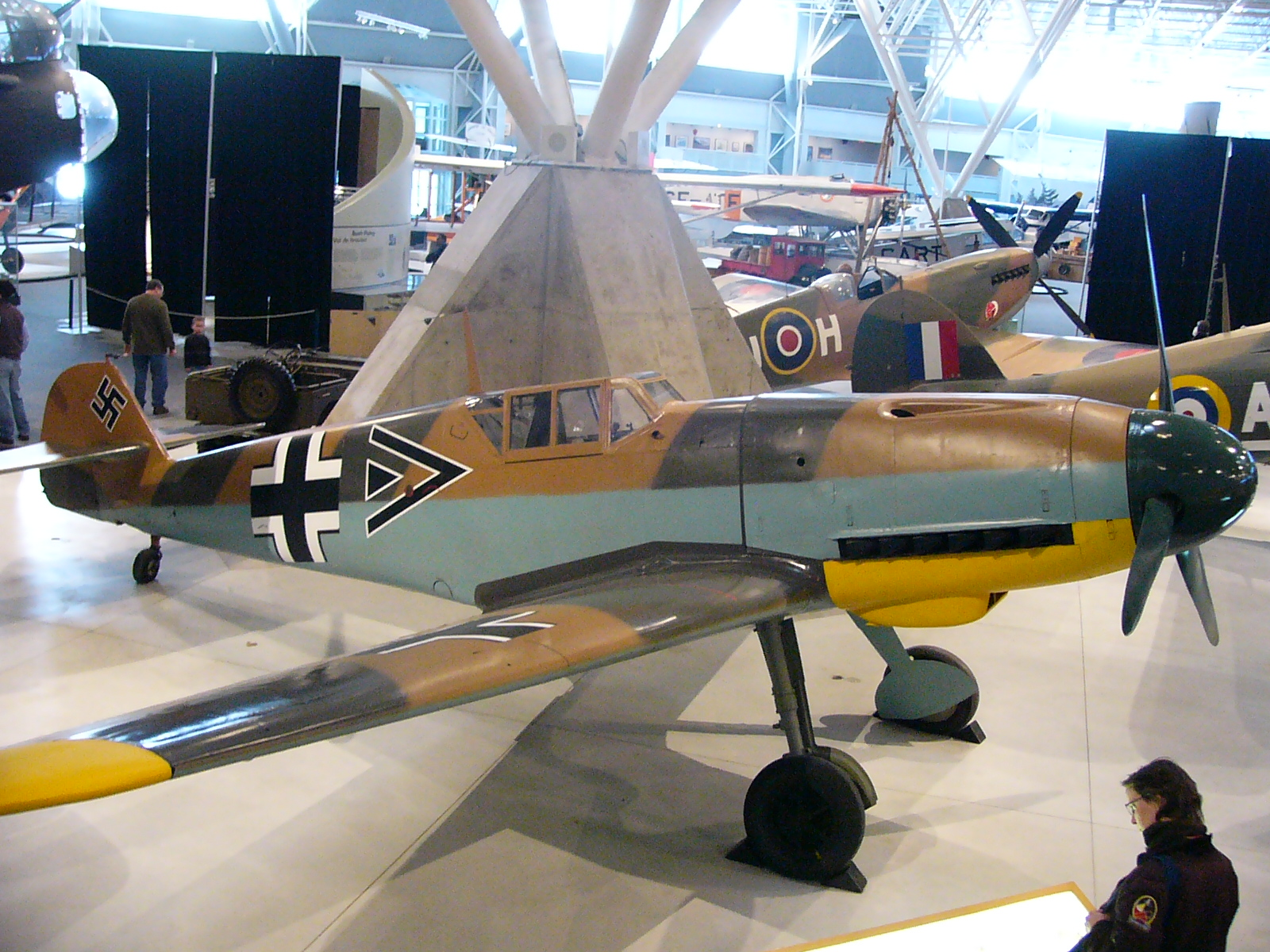
Bf 109 F-4/Z, assigned to Carganico in August 1942.

Carganico was appointed Gruppenkommandeur (group commander) of II. Gruppe of JG 5 on 1 June 1942, succeeding Strümpell who had been transferred. Command of 6. Staffel was passed to Oberleutnant Hans-Diether Hartwein. On 26 July, Stumpff wrote to the Luftwaffenpersonalamt, the personnel department within the Ministry of Aviation (RLM—Reichsluftfahrtministerium), requesting a preferential promotion for Carganico to Hauptmann (captain). Stumpff also requested that Carganico's command of II. Gruppe be made permanently. Apparently, Carganico appointment to Gruppencommandeur had been temporary.

In summer 1942, he claimed 23 victories in six weeks and was awarded the German Cross in Gold (Deutsches Kreuz in Gold) on 18 May. On 12 August, Carganico was part of a Schwarm intercepted by Soviet fighters and Carganico's Messerschmitt Bf 109 F-4/Z (Werknummer 10132—factory number) was damaged sufficiently to force an emergency landing 8 km (5.0 mi) south of the Motovsky Gulf. This aircraft is currently on display at the Canada Aviation and Space Museum. He evaded capture, headed west and reached a German infantry position the next day where he was picked up by a Fieseler Fi 156 Storch and flown back to Petsamo.

=== Defense of the Reich ===
On 16 March 1944, the commander of I. Gruppe of JG 5, Major Erich Gerlitz, was killed in action. At the time, I. Gruppe was based in Herzogenaurach Airfield and was fighting the United States Army Air Forces (USAAF) in Defense of the Reich. Carganico succeeded Gerlitz as commander of I. Gruppe and at the same time was promoted to Major (major). Carganico's successor as commander of II. Gruppe of JG 5 was Hauptmann Theodor Weissenberger, initially as acting commander until he was officially appointed on 16 April. On 10 May, Carganico shot down the RAF de Havilland Mosquito PR.IX LR421 from the aerial reconnaissance No. 540 Squadron. The Mosquito was shot down approximately 30 kilometres (19 miles) southwest of the Wiener Neustadt over Sankt Corona am Wechsel.

On 27 May, five Luftwaffe Gruppen joined up around Karlsruhe to defend against an attack on southern Germany. The fighters were then vectored to a point of intercept southwest of Strasbourg where they were to engage USAAF bombers. On the approach, the German fighters were intercepted by USAAF fighters. Carganico lost his adjutant and wingman, Hauptmann Heinz Deuschle, early in the encounter, shot down by North American P-51 Mustang fighters. Attempting to evade the fighters, Carganico was killed when his Bf 109 G-5 (Werknummer 110087) hit high tension cables while attempting a forced landing near Chevry, 5 kilometres (3.1 miles) southwest of Saint-Dié-des-Vosges, France. Carganico was the son of Luftwaffe general Generalleutnant Victor Carganico. He was buried in the military section of the Waldfriedhof Zehlendorf on 6 June 1944. Command of I. Gruppe was given to Weissenberger, who took control of the Gruppe in early June 1944.

== Summary of career ==
=== Aerial victory claims ===
According to US historian David T. Zabecki, Carganico was credited with 60 aerial victories. Obermaier also lists Carganico with 60 aerial victories claimed in over 600 combat missions, including six victories over the Western Allies. Mathews and Foreman, authors of Luftwaffe Aces — Biographies and Victory Claims, researched the German Federal Archives and states that Carganico was credited with approximately 60 aerial victories. This figure includes 54 aerial victories on the Eastern Front and six over the Western Allies.

Victory claims were logged to a map-reference (PQ = Planquadrat), for example "PQ 25 Ost 96216". The Luftwaffe grid map (Jägermeldenetz) covered all of Europe, western Russia and North Africa and was composed of rectangles measuring 15 minutes of latitude by 30 minutes of longitude, an area of about 360 square miles (930 km^{2}). These sectors were then subdivided into 36 smaller units to give a location area 3 km × 4 km (1.9 mi × 2.5 mi) in size.

Chronicle of aerial victories
This and the ? (exclamation mark) indicates information discrepancies listed by Prien, Stemmer, Rodeike, Bock, Mombeek, Mathews, and Foreman.
Claim	Date	Time	Type	Location	Claim	Date	Time	Type	Location
– Stab II. Gruppe of Jagdgeschwader 77 – Norway — 6 April – 10 November 1940
1	21 June 1940	16:24	Hampden	west of Hardangerfjord	3	9 July 1940	10:08	Blenheim	northwest of Stavanger
2	9 July 1940	09:58	Blenheim	northwest of Stavanger	4	14 October 1940	15:14	Hudson	
– Stab II. Gruppe of Jagdgeschwader 77 – Battle of Britain and on the English Channel — 15 November 1940 – 30 March 1941
5	30 November 1940	08:25	Blenheim	14 km (8.7 mi) southeast of Morlaix					
– 1. Staffel of Jagdgeschwader 77 – Southern and western Norway — 1 February – 22 June 1941
6? (Note: This claim is not listed by Mathews and Foreman.)	24 May 1941	12:53	Beaufort? (Note: According to Mombeek claimed as a Bristol Blenheim.)	30 km (19 mi) north-northwest of Stavanger					
– 1. Staffel of Jagdgeschwader 77 – Eastern and northern Norway — 22 June – 5 December 1941
According to Prien, Stemmer, Rodeike and Bock, Carganico claimed his 7th to 27th aerial victories in the timeframe 22 June to 5 December 1941, fifteen of which can't be dated.
13	11 July 1941	—	Consolidated? (Note: According to Mombeek claimed as a Polikarpov I-16. According to Weal, probably a GST, a license built variant of the Consolidated PBY Catalina.)			12 August 1941	—	I-16	Motovsky Gulf
	13 July 1941	—	I-16	Shonguy	25	2 September 1941	—	I-16	
	2 August 1941	—	unknown						
– 6. Staffel of Jagdgeschwader 5 – Eastern Front and northern Norway, and Finland — 6 December 1941 – 31 May 1942
28?	22 April 1942	10:15	Hurricane	Herzberg	38	10 May 1942	—	Hurricane	3 km (1.9 mi) south of Sayda-Guba
29?	22 April 1942	10:15	Hurricane		39	12 May 1942	—	Hurricane	Litsa Bight/Ura-Guba Bight
30	26 April 1942	16:16	Pe-2	70 km (43 mi) southeast of Petsamo airfield	40	12 May 1942	—	Hurricane	western Kola Bay
31	26 April 1942	—	Pe-2	1 km (0.62 mi) west of Murmansk; 70 km (43 mi) south of Petsamo	41	14 May 1942	—	P-40? (Note: According to Mathews and Foreman claimed as a Petlyakov Pe-2.)	20 km (12 mi) north of Murmansk
32	28 April 1942	—	Hurricane	western bank of the Kola Bay	42	15 May 1942	—	Hurricane	15 km (9.3 mi) northwest of Murmansk
33	28 April 1942	—	Hurricane	western bank of the Kola Bay	? (Note: This claim is not listed by Mombeek, nor by Prien, Stemmer, Rodeike and Bock.)	16 May 1942	—	unknown	
34	29 April 1942	13:00	I-153	5 km (3.1 mi) west of the Litsa Bay	?	16 May 1942	—	unknown	
35	9 May 1942	17:04	P-40	40 km (25 mi) southwest of Motovski	43	19 May 1942	—	Hurricane	3 km (1.9 mi) southwest of Murmashi
36	10 May 1942	—	Hurricane	10 km (6.2 mi) north of Ura-Guba	44	19 May 1942	—	Hurricane	3 km (1.9 mi) south of Murmashi
37	10 May 1942	—	Hurricane	Aya Bay					
– Stab II. Gruppe of Jagdgeschwader 5 – Eastern Front and northern Norway, and Finland — 1 June – 31 December 1942
45	1 June 1942	—	I-16	5 km (3.1 mi) west of Murmansk	47	2 June 1942	—	Hurricane	3 km (1.9 mi) west of Murmansk
46	1 June 1942	—	P-40	3 km (1.9 mi) west of Murmansk	48	22 June 1942	—	fighter	
According to Prien, Stemmer, Rodeike and Bock, Carganico claimed four aerial victories which can't be dated.
	29 June 1942	—	Hurricane	Murmansk		29 June 1942	—	Hurricane	
	29 June 1942	—	Hurricane	Murmansk		30 June 1942	—	Hurricane	Murmashi
	29 June 1942	—	Hurricane						
– Stab II. Gruppe of Jagdgeschwader 5 – Eastern Front and northern Norway, and Finland — 1 January – 31 December 1943
53	21 April 1943	—	Hurricane	vicinity of Kandalaksha					
According to Prien, Stemmer, Rodeike and Bock, Carganico claimed two aerial victories which can't be dated.
56	8 December 1943	09:46	R-5	PQ 25 Ost 96216	58	15 December 1943	09:49	P-40	PQ 35 Ost 07711, southwest of Velikiye Luki
57	8 December 1943	11:45	La-5	east of Nevel					
– Stab II. Gruppe of Jagdgeschwader 5 – Eastern Front and northern Norway, and Finland — 1 January – 25 March 1944
59	15 February 1944	12:06	Il-2	PQ 99688					
– Stab I. Gruppe of Jagdgeschwader 5 – Defense of the Reich — 16 March – 27 May 1944
60	10 May 1944	11:30	Mosquito	35 km (22 mi) southwest of the Wiener Neustadt					

=== Awards ===
- Iron Cross (1939) 2nd and 1st Class
- Knight's Cross of the Iron Cross on 25 September 1941 as Oberleutnant and Staffelkapitän of the 6./Jagdgeschwader 5 (Note: According to Scherzer as Staffelkapitän of the 1./Jagdgeschwader 77.)
- German Cross in Gold on 18 May 1942 as Oberleutnant in the 6./Jagdgeschwader 5

== Notes ==
Military offices
Preceded by Major Hennig Strümpell	Gruppenkommandeur of II./JG 5 April 1942 – 26 March 1944	Succeeded by Hauptmann Theodor Weissenberger
Preceded by Major Erich Gerlitz	Gruppenkommandeur of I./JG 5; 26 March 1944 – 27 May 1944	Succeeded by Hauptmann Theodor Weissenberger
