= Battle of the Heligoland Bight (1939) =

First major aerial battle of WWII

Defence of the Reich
- Part of the Western Front of World War II
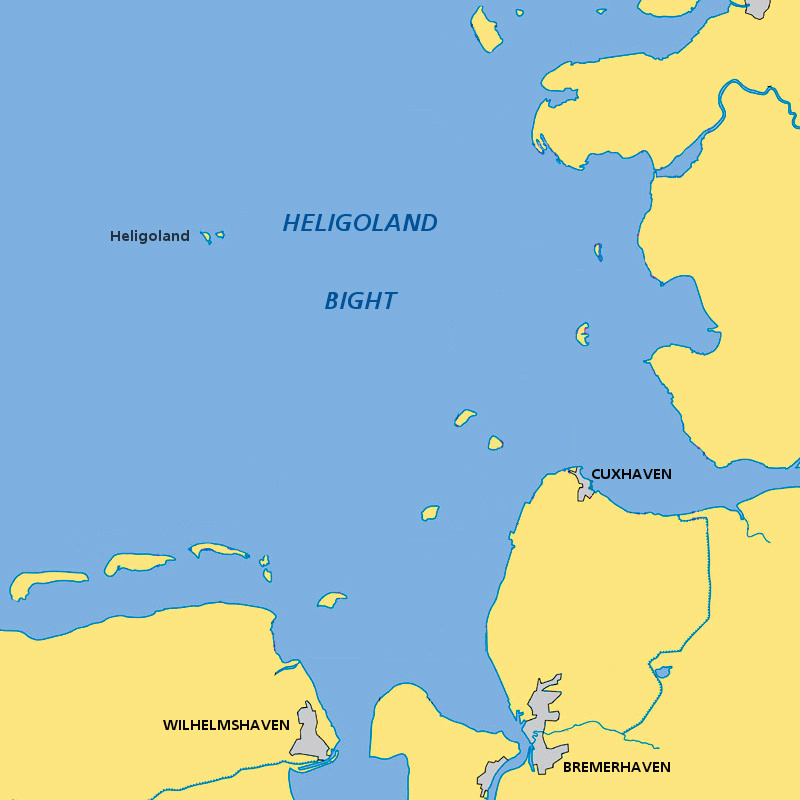
- The Heligoland Bight
Date	18 December 1939
Location	Heligoland Bight and North Sea, Germany
Result	German victory

Belligerents
United Kingdom	Germany

Commanders and leaders
(United Kingdom) Richard Kellett	(Nazi Germany) C.A. Schumacher

Units involved
No. 9 Squadron RAF; No. 37 Squadron RAF; No. 149 Squadron RAF	Stab./Jagdgeschwader 1 II./Jagdgeschwader 77; II./Trägergruppe 186 (N)./Jagdgeschwader 26; I./Zerstörergeschwader 76; I./Jagdgeschwader 26

Strength
22 Vickers Wellington bombers	44 fighter aircraft

Casualties and losses
12 bombers destroyed 3 bombers damaged 57 killed	2 Bf 109s destroyed 2 Bf 109s severely damaged. 1 Bf 109 non-combat 1 Bf 109 lightly damaged 2 Bf 110s severely damaged 7 Bf 110s lightly damaged 2 pilots killed 2 pilots wounded 11 sailors killed 30 sailors injured

The Battle of the Heligoland Bight was the first "named" air battle of the Second World War, which began the longest air campaign of the war on 3 September 1939, the Defence of the Reich. After the declaration of war, RAF Bomber Command began operations against Nazi Germany but limited their attacks to those targets that were purely military and had little risk of civilian casualties. This largely limited their efforts to attacks on the Kriegsmarine (German Navy) warships in German ports to prevent their use in the Battle of the Atlantic.

Early operations led the RAF to conclude that fighter aircraft were not a serious threat against modern bombers. They were also marked by a lack of coordination and minor issues such as bad weather and communication problems that meant none of these early operations were very intense. The RAF implemented changes to ensure more aircraft could be launched more rapidly to make up for these issues.

On 18 December 1939, a force of three squadrons was launched against capital ships anchored in the Wilhelmshaven area. Originally 24 Vickers Wellingtons took off, but two turned back due to engine trouble before reaching German airspace. The German reaction was slow, but eventually between 80 and 120 fighter aircraft were launched, although only 44 made contact with the British bombers. Of the 22 bombers that reached the target area, the Luftwaffe shot down 12, over half the force.

The battle had a huge influence on both sides' strategies. It led the RAF to abandon daylight missions in favour of night bombing as daytime casualties were too high. In contrast, the failure of the raid led the Luftwaffe to believe Germany proper was invulnerable to enemy attack. This belief was reinforced by the success of the Battle of France, which meant that opposing air forces were pushed too far away for effective bombing attacks on the German homeland.

The Germans' neglect of their day fighter force had serious strategic consequences in later years. By the time they began reorganising defences to combat continued RAF raids and also the United States Army Air Forces (USAAF) strategic bombing campaign, they were already engaged in a war of attrition for which they were not prepared. This oversight was one of the contributing factors in the defeat of the Luftwaffe in the Defence of the Reich campaign. The Battle of the Heligoland Bight was later described as "amongst the most important actions of the entire war".

== Background ==
=== RAF strategy ===
Before the outbreak of war, RAF Bomber Command firmly believed that air power could win wars without the need for naval and land fighting, since "the bomber will always get through." Tightly flown bomber formations with heavy defensive armament were thought capable of warding off enemy fighters even without fighter escort. The RAF lacked a four-engine bomber with adequate defensive protection which could carry heavy bomb loads to German targets. The only possible targets within range of British bombers were those in the industrial region of the Ruhr.

The Netherlands and Belgium wished to remain neutral and refused to allow the RAF to establish bases from which they could fly deeper into Germany. They also forbade overflying by British bombers to and from Germany. After the outbreak of war, the French refused to allow RAF bombers to bomb German cities from French airfields. The French felt secure behind the Maginot Line but their air force did not possess the modern bombers to attack the Luftwaffe. French fighter forces were not yet ready for an all out defensive campaign against the Germans either. A fear of retaliation was the main French reason. The only recourse was to fly missions directly from Britain and only ports or coastal cities in northern Germany were within easy reach. This state of affairs suited the British, in particular, the Admiralty.

The most immediate threat to the Allies during the Phoney War period was the U-boat. Some German submarines had been sent to sea before the British declaration of war. Once war was declared, the U-boats began operations against British ships that were bringing in supplies from North America and areas of the British Empire. German submarine U-47 sank the battleship HMS Royal Oak at Scapa Flow in October 1939, with the loss of 786 crew. As a consequence the Admiralty pressed for the RAF to concentrate its efforts on RAF Coastal Command rather than a strategic bomber force. This was debated within the British establishment well into 1941. To avoid the bombing of civilian targets, the British formulated the Western Air Plan 7B (WAP 7B), which planned for attacks on German warships. German ships were legitimate targets and, at sea or in port, were far enough away from civilian areas to avoid unnecessary casualties. The Plan revolved around their elimination to prevent their use as supplements to the U-boat fleet.

=== 3 September – 17 December ===
Heligoland Bight (marked with square)

To fit in with this strategy, the initial plans of the RAF involved raids against German shipping on receipt of the results of aerial reconnaissance. This was attempted on 3 September, when a Bristol Blenheim (flown by Flying Officer Andrew McPherson of No. 139 Squadron RAF)—on a reconnaissance flight over the North Sea—spotted a large naval force in the Schillig Roads off Wilhelmshaven. The radio failed and an attack could not be launched until McPherson returned to base, when 15 Handley Page Hampdens and nine Vickers Wellington bombers were sent against the German ships. The weather was poor and the bombers failed to find any targets.

A similar attempt was made on 4 September, when McPherson again spotted warships off Brunsbüttel, Wilhelmshaven and in the Schillig Roads. The radio failed again and no attack could be launched until McPherson's return. A force of 10 Blenheims from No. 110 Squadron RAF and No. 107 Squadron RAF along with five more from No. 139 Squadron and eight Wellingtons of No. 149 Squadron RAF took off to locate the German warships Gneisenau, Scharnhorst and Admiral Scheer, which some aircraft found. No. 149 Squadron was not prepared for war. At least one of the crews—Flying Officer (F/O) Bill McRae—nearly took off without a bomb load; looking in, he noticed the bomb bay was empty. On the way to the target, Squadron Leader Paul Harris ordered his gunners to test their weapons. They all failed and he was heading into German territory defenceless. Not wanting to turn back on his first raid, he pressed ahead.

The same targets were attacked by 9 Squadron later in the day, in and around Brunsbüttel. Results were poor with five Blenheims and two Wellingtons lost and only minimal damage caused to the German warships. Admiral Scheer was hit by three bombs that failed to explode, while the light cruiser Emden—not one of the priority targets—was present and also damaged by a Blenheim that crashed into the forecastle of the ship. The crash killed 11 sailors and injured 30. One Wellington bomber accidentally strayed over Danish territory and dropped five bombs on the town of Esbjerg, mistaking it for Brunsbüttel; one bomb hit an apartment block, killing one and wounding seven. The accidental bombing led to false rumors that British forces had occupied Southern Jutland.

II./Jagdgeschwader 77 (II. Gruppe of JG 77; II Wing, Fighter Group 77, Oberstleutnant Carl-August Schumacher) took off from Nordholz Airbase and intercepted 9 Squadron. Feldwebels Hans Troitzsch and Alfred Held each claimed a victory and Leutnant Metz another. These aircraft from No. 9 Squadron were the first RAF aircraft to be shot down by enemy fighters during the war and Troitzsch was most likely to have been the first enemy pilot to shoot one down. Another four Blenheims of No. 107 Squadron were shot down by anti-aircraft fire. The Germans believed their air defences had established an effective defence from Allied attack. Use of the early Freya radar had given the German fighters eight minutes warning of their approach.

The delay between spotting German warships and the arrival of the bombers was considered to be too great, and it was decided to carry out reconnaissance in force, with formations of bombers being sent out over the North Sea to find and attack German warships. Their orders forbade them from attacking ships in port, infringing neutral airspace or even attacking German warships escorting merchant ships. A patrol on 29 September resulted in five Hampdens being shot down by Messerschmitt Bf 109s of II./JG 77 but an attack by 24 Wellingtons of 149, 38 and 115 squadrons on 3 December was more successful, claiming a German minesweeper sunk (confirmed as "M1407" by German archives, sunk by an unexploded bomb passing through the ship), while defensive fire from the Wellington gunners repelled attacks by German fighters, shooting one down for no loss. The German pilot shot down was future German ace Günther Specht. He was shot down by Corporal Copley of No. 38 Squadron RAF.. A German report stated the attack was cleverly executed from out of the sun and delivered to avoid the nearby civilian areas.

An armed reconnaissance by twelve Wellingtons on 14 December resulted in six being lost as the formation, at very low level because of the low cloud base, was engaged by fighter aircraft and anti-aircraft guns. The RAF believed that none of the lost Wellingtons had been shot down by fighters and so maintained faith in their defensive capabilities when flown in tight formations. This summation was odd considering that several of the surviving bombers had damage from small calibre weapons such as those found on Messerschmitt fighter aircraft. The Luftwaffe claimed five bombers (plus one probable) for the loss of one fighter while none of the German FlaK units claimed a victory.

=== German defences ===
The Luftwaffe's air defence organisation went through a number of changes in the first months of the war. The defence of the northern German ports and vital strategic targets was given to the local or nearest Luftverteidigungskommando (Air Defence Command). In this case the unit responsible for the protection of German warships of the Kriegsmarine was the Luftverteidigungskommando Hamburg (Air Defence Command Hamburg).

The system was impractical; the Hamburg air defence district controlled air and ground defences but each was geographically in no position to help the other. There was no combined arms synthesis, meaning that the FlaK arm did not directly support the German defences thereby forming one mass defence. Instead, fighter units protecting the coast were held there, with Kriegsmarine FlaK units, while the Hamburg air defence artillery was held too far inland. The Luftwaffe fighters and FlaK units were located too far apart to coordinate.

Coordination was not helped by the poor relations between the Luftwaffe and Kriegsmarine Commanders-in-Chief, Reichsmarschall Hermann Göring and Großadmiral (Grand Admiral) Erich Raeder. The system required both services to work together but it produced co-operation difficulties. A solution to the problem was twofold. Fighter units defending the North Sea coast were subordinated to Luftgaukommando XI (Air District Command 11) in Hanover. These fighter units would function as an autonomous fighter command or Jagdfliegerführer (Fighter Flyer Leaders). The command of Fighter Command unit was given to Oberstleutnant Carl-August Schumacher, a former commander of II./Jagdgeschwader 77. Schumacher had served in the Kaiserliche Marine (Imperial German Navy) during the First World War and as an officer cadet had seen combat at the Battle of Jutland. It was hoped with his naval background and easy personality it would ease any difficulties with naval service cooperation. Schumacher and his counterpart in the Navy were of the same rank, so each lacked authority over the other, an arrangement that stifled unity of command.

== Forces involved ==
=== Luftwaffe ===
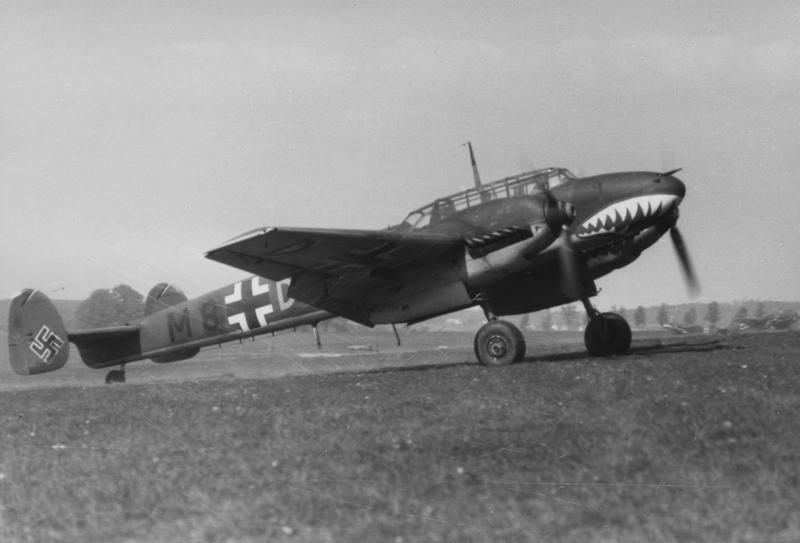
The Messerschmitt Bf 110 was a formidable bomber destroyer.

Schumacher was given a new command, Stab./Jagdgeschwader 1 (Command./Fighter Group 1, or JG 1), sometimes referred to as JG Nord (Fighter Group North) or JG Schumacher. In addition to the Bf 109D and E variants, the force was also equipped with the Messerschmitt Bf 110. The lack of action during the Phoney War period meant that these aircraft, usually in demand by offensive air fleets (Luftflotte), were available for defensive roles.

Stab./JG 1 controlled all the following Gruppen (groups; wings in RAF parlance) which had a combined strength of 80–100 aircraft:

- II./Jagdgeschwader 77 (JG 77) commanded by Hilmer von Bülow-Bothkamp
- II./Trägergruppe 186 (Carrier Air Group 186; TrGr 186) which was officially attached to Zerstörergeschwader 1 (Destroyer Wing 1; ZG 1) but placed under Stab./JG 1 for defensive duties under Major Heinrich Seeliger
- 10. (Nacht)./Jagdgeschwader 26 (JG 26) under Staffelkapitän (Squadron Leader) Johannes Steinhoff
- I./Zerstörergeschwader 76 (ZG 76) under the command of Hauptmann Günther Reinecke, and 2. Staffel
- I./Zerstörergeschwader 76 (ZG 76) under the command of Geschwaderkommodore (Wing Commander) Wolfgang Falck.
- JGr. 101 was attached to ZG 1 and eventually became II./ZG 1. It was commanded by Major Hellmuth Reichardt.

=== RAF ===
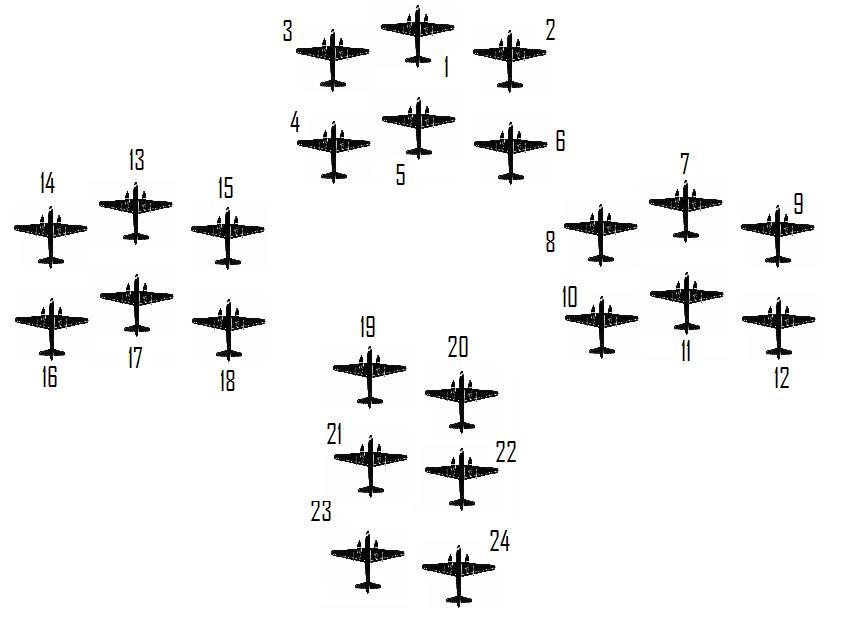
Formation 1 Section 1: 1 Richard Kellett 2 Turner 3 Speirs Section 2: 4 Kelly 5 Duguid 6 Riddlesworth Formation 2 Section 1: 7 Harris 8 Briden 9 Bolloch Section 2: 10 Ramshaw 11 Grant 12 Purdy Formation 3 Section 1: 13 Guthrie 14 Petts 15 McRae Section 2: 16 Challes 17 Allison 18 Lines Formation 4 19 Hue-Williams 20 Lemon 21 Wimberley 22 Lewis 23 Thompson 24 Ruse

The RAF committed No. 3 Group RAF to the attack. Usually the group consisted of 9 Squadron, 37 Squadron, 38 Squadron, 99 Squadron, 115 Squadron, 149 Squadron together with 214 Squadron and 21 Squadron in reserve. The Group was hastily set up for daylight missions, having been intended for night bombing. The quality of the training was dubious and many of the crews had not been given proper tuition in formation flying. Only 9 and 214 squadrons were able to fly in perfect formations. To improve formation flying and give crews experience of combat conditions, 37 Squadron practised mock combats with RAF Fighter Command Supermarine Spitfires from RAF Tangmere. Warnings were given by the Spitfire pilots that they could have decimated the squadron within ten minutes because of their poor formation flying and lack of fighter escort but were ignored.

Squadron Leader Harris of 149 Squadron and Wing Commander Kellett were the only experienced combat leaders but Kellett had not flown with 9 or 37 Squadrons as a group and had never had a chance to practice formation flying or bombing with them. He had not been given the time or opportunity to discuss or formulate a plan for bombing naval targets, whether as a group, squadron or even as flights. Nor had he even been able to discuss or pass on any tactical advice about what the formation should do in the event of fighter attack. He was given command of an incoherent group of squadrons which were highly inexperienced. For the 18 December mission, 24 Wellington Bombers from 9, 37 and 149 Squadrons were given to Kellet. The British bombers flew in a diamond shape formation.

== Battle ==
=== Target ===
On the morning of 18 December 1939, The Times of London published the story of the Battle of the River Plate and the demise of Admiral Graf Spee and a few hours later RAF Bomber Command attempted to sink another major warship. In accordance with Operational Order B. 60 of 17 December, the targets were German warships either in port or at sea. The RAF bombers were ordered to overfly the Heligoland Bight and the port of Wilhelmshaven, attacking ships but avoiding civilian living quarters, merchant shipping or land itself.

=== Bombers en route ===
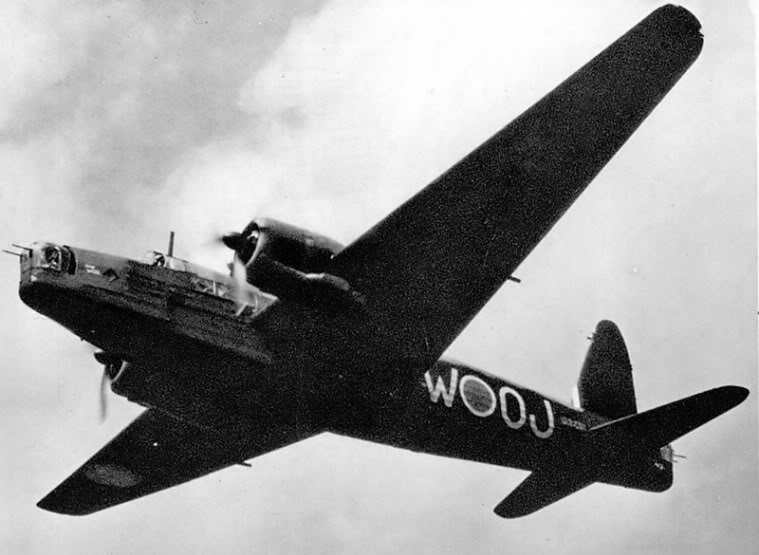
A Wellington Mk I of No. 149 Squadron as flown on this raid, seen in 1940

The first Wellington, N2960, took off from RAF Mildenhall in Suffolk at 09:27 with Wing Commander Richard Kellett at the controls; 9 Squadron took off from the nearby RAF Honington, formed up over King's Lynn and started out over the North Sea. No. 37 Squadron took off but missed the rendezvous and caught up with the main formation an hour later over the North Sea. Once over the Wash it set a course of 040° true, as far as latitude 55° north. The plan was to avoid heavy anti-aircraft artillery concentrations on the Frisian Islands. As the formation left England the cloud broke and it found itself without cover in a bright, crystal-clear sky. N2984 and N2894, piloted by Duguid and Kelly, turned back; the first due to engine trouble, the other escorting the troubled bomber back to base. The remaining bombers flew north past the Frisian Islands then turned due south, continuing their mission in perfect visibility which made it easy to be spotted by German aircraft.

Reaching the German–Danish border at 55°N 05°E, the formation turned south. It headed towards Schleswig-Holstein and then planned to turn due west to Wilhelmshaven. The move was designed to initiate the attack from the east, through the "back door". The plan worked, as the bombers arrived without being intercepted but the southward journey caused the bombers to fly within range of a Freya on the island of Wangerooge. Leutnant Hermann Diehl of Regiment 3, battery LN-Vers was demonstrating the Freya set to a visiting naval officer. Diehl was using Falck's 2./ZG 76 as a suitable target test the set. After some demonstration, he swung the set north, pointing to the Heligoland Bight. As soon as he did so he picked up an echo.

He telephoned Schumacher's Geschwader at Jever. They were told that the naval radar reported nothing and that it was ridiculous to think the British would attack in such clear skies. Diehl spoke to von Major Harry von Bülow-Bothkamp, commanding II./JG 77. No one wanted to listen; about 20 minutes later, naval Freyas also picked up the formation but still no fighters were scrambled. German radar was just as efficient as its British counterpart, the problem lay in communication. The Luftwaffe and Kriegsmarine had poor communication and their areas of responsibility overlapped, creating confusion over who was responsible. Added to this was the German disbelief that RAF would expose itself on a day when conditions favoured the fighter. Only when observers on the ground confirmed that the formation existed were fighters scrambled. The observers described a formation of 44 British aircraft, twice its actual strength.

As the bombers passed down the coast, anti-aircraft artillery fire from ships and harbour defences was noted. Once in the target area they also came under heavy anti-aircraft artillery fire from Bremerhaven and Wilhelmshaven. Ships near Schillig Roads also opened fire. The bombers replied with their machine guns to throw the gunners off. German fire was at the correct height but exploded behind the bombers. Soon after, the formation was over Wilhelmshaven harbour, with Gneisenau and Scharnhorst at anchor beneath them. The ships were too close to shore and Kellett chose not to risk dropping bombs to avoid civilian casualties. Kellett—commanding the formation—had been ordered to attack at minimum altitude (about 10,000 ft (3,000 m)). The belief that the greatest danger would come from anti-aircraft fire, not German fighters, had by then become part of RAF operational doctrine.

=== Aerial engagement ===
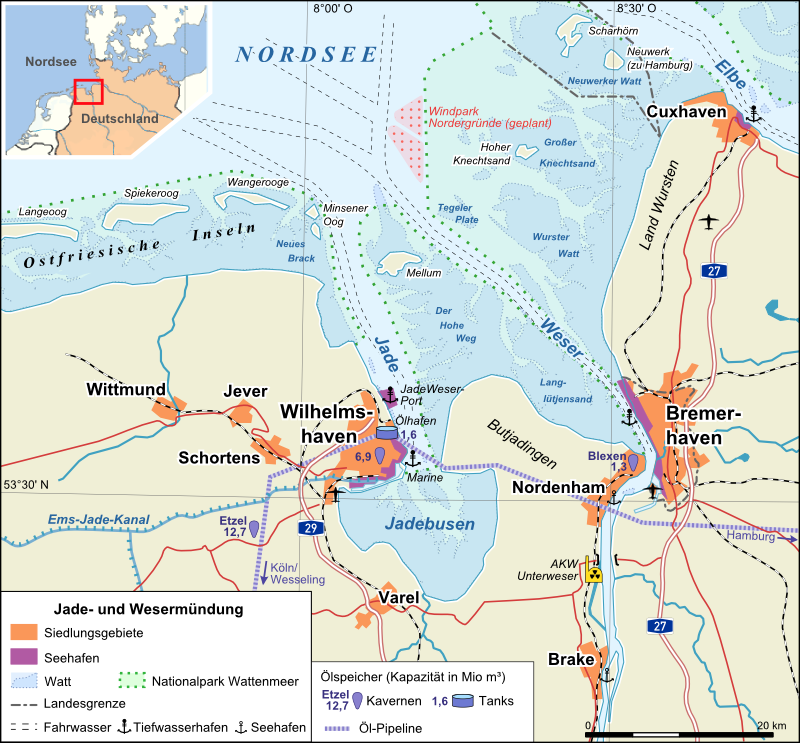
The target area. Kellet's force approached from the east over the Jade Estuary and towards Wilhelmshaven.

It was only at this point that fighters started to be scrambled to intercept the bombers. Bülow-Bothkamp stated that it was the naval Freya that gave the alert, but this contradicts Diehl's account. The first air engagement occurred an hour after the Luftwaffe Freya made the initial report.

At 13:10, the RAF formation flew over the mud flats to the west of Cuxhaven and Wesermünde and came under fire from flak positions 214, 244 and 264. As Kellett turned west towards the Jade Estuary and over Wilhelmshaven anti-aircraft units 212, 222, 252, 262 and 272 opened fire. Scharnhorst, Gneisenau and all the other naval ships in the dock opened fire in support. In the distance, at Schillig Point, the bombers could see German fighters taking off from a camouflaged airstrip. In a quick briefing, the JG 1 commander had told his pilots to make a beam attack as it was a blind spot for the Wellington. A stern attack was dangerous, as the gunners could then target an attacking fighter with a coordinated and concentrated cone of fire. One weakness also noted was that early types of Wellingtons lacked self-sealing fuel tanks. This meant if the German fighters hit the wings, the bomber was liable to burn.

Unworried by the Luftwaffe, 149 Squadron was the only section to drop bombs on the ships in Wilhelmshaven harbour. Six 500 lb (230 kg) bombs fell and the results were unknown. It was all the RAF had to show for its first major raid on a German target. As the bombers emerged from the anti-aircraft barrage, the RAF formation was disorganised. Kellett's and Harris's formations were intact, but Squadron Leader Guthrie was ahead of his No. 9 Squadron and No. 37 Squadron at the rear was straggling. Its commander, Squadron Leader Hue-Williams, was struggling to catch up with the main formation and was forging ahead of his formation without keeping it together. Other members of Hue-Williams's squadron increased their speed to keep up with their leader.

Oberleutnant Johannes Steinhoff flying with Bf 109Ds of 10.(Nacht)./JG 26 took off escorted by a Rotte (pair) from II./JG 77. At 13:30, they attacked one group after the anti-aircraft fire lifted. The Bf 109s claimed seven bombers, with Steinhoff claiming two. The first kill was credited to Unteroffizier Heolmayr. At 13:40, a Rotte of Bf 110s from ZG 76, led by Hauptmann Wolfgang Falck, claimed four bombers. Falck's aircraft was severely damaged, forcing him to disengage but he managed to glide back to base and make a "dead-stick" landing without power. Unteroffizier Fresia also made two claims. Fresia's second victim was Flying Officer Allison. Harris came under attack from a Bf 109 piloted by Oberleutnant Johann Fuhrmann, who failed to hit the bomber in beam attacks. He then tried a stern attack, against earlier advice, only to get shot down. Fuhrmann managed to land in the sea a few hundred yards from the island of Spiekeroog. Witnesses on the beach saw him attempt to swim to shore only for Fuhrmann to drown. It is likely he was shot down by Aircraftman Second Class Gouldson from Riddlesworth's Wellington. During the battle a Bf 110 piloted by Oberleutnant Gordon Gollob shot down and killed Guthrie of 9 Squadron. Hue-Williams (37 Squadron) was also shot down, possibly by Hauptmann Reinecke. Soon afterwards, the Germans suffered a casualty when Leutnant Roman Stiegler crashed into the sea in pursuit of Flying Officer Lemon and was killed. At the same time, Jagdgruppe 101 claimed two more bombers, including one by Oberleutnant Rolf Kaldrack. Bf 110s from ZG 76 had also attacked the bombers claiming five more.

Among the German claimants was Helmut Lent who was credited with two victories. After landing at Jever from a patrol, Lent took off to intercept. He engaged Herbie Ruse's Wellington, killing most of the crew. The Wellington was pouring black smoke and Lent broke off believing it about to crash. Lent then pursued Thompson's Wellington, which crashed just off the coast of Borkum. Lent's third claim was not granted: he attacked and shot down Wimberley's aircraft but because the aircraft was already badly damaged and judged to be about to crash, Lent was refused the victory and Stab./JG 1's Geschwaderkommodore Schumacher was given the credit. Schumacher also shot down Pilot Officer Lewis's aircraft, close to Borkum. At 13:45, the German fighters—at the limit of their endurance—returned to base. By 14:05, the other bomber formation was beyond interception range and the last shots were fired.

== Aftermath ==
=== Overclaiming by both sides ===
The German fighter crews claimed 38 bombers shot down, against actual RAF losses of 12 aircraft. The gunners in the British bombers claimed twelve German fighters and twelve severely damaged. German casualties amounted to three Bf 109s destroyed, two severely damaged and two Bf 110s severely damaged, a case of overclaiming by both sides. Seven Bf 110s and one Bf 109 suffered light damage. Johann Fuhrmann and Roman Stiegler (both flying Bf 109s) were the only pilots to die in this action; Dietrich Robitzsch from Jagdgruppe 101, was uninjured after making a forced landing and writing-off his Bf 109 when his engine was hit and subsequently seized; Feldwebel Hans Troitzsch (Bf 109) and Leutnant Gustav Uellenbeck (Bf 110) were wounded. British aircrews also claimed between sixty and eighty fighters engaging in combat over the Heligoland Bight.

To back up their claims, the Luftwaffe insisted that 44 bombers were in the air, which was later increased by OKL to 52. Some hours later these claims were reduced to 34 but months later the reports were analysed and reduced to 27 "confirmed" victories. This was still over twice the number that was shot down and five more than the size of the formation. German historians have claimed that official British figures were tampered with to hide losses but careful examination of the records reveals no deception. Obituaries from the Commonwealth War Graves Commission record the identity of all service personnel who died during the war and have no known grave; as would be the case for airmen lost at sea. No airmen were reported missing that day from squadrons other than 9, 37 and 149.

=== British assessment ===
The tactical assessment of both sides was radically different. Bomber Command believed the attack was a failure as a result of poor formation flying and leadership. It was also maintained that better beam defensive armament and self-sealing fuel tanks were needed. These tactical considerations might, it believed, still salvage the day-bomber concept. On 22 December, an unsigned 3 Group report stated:

There is every reason to believe that a very close formation of six Wellington aircraft will emerge from a long and heavy attack by enemy fighters with very few if any casualties to its own aircraft. A loose formation is however liable to suffer very heavy casualties under the same conditions.

On 19 December 1939, Air Vice-Marshal Jackie Baldwin reported that Guthrie and Hue-Williams were to blame for racing ahead of their formations and breaking up the defensive formation. Baldwin sent his report to the Bomber Command Commander-in-Chief, Edgar Ludlow-Hewitt, who replied on 23 December and joined Baldwin in condemning the leaders of 9 and 37 Squadrons for abandoning their flight. Hewitt called this action an "unforgivable crime", although Harris later stated that this was unfair, as Guthrie and Hue-Williams were untrained and had never faced the enemy before. Harris also blamed 3 Group Headquarters, stating that there had been no planning or liaison between the squadrons. Harris also noted the Group Operations Staff had not provided any formation lessons.

In the Operations notes, Formation Flying, orders specifically stated that the formation was not to stay together: each six aircraft section was to be a self-contained defensive unit, flying at different heights, because more than twelve aircraft per formation made it unwieldy and unmanageable by one leader. Even so, the notes also pointed to the importance of holding a formation within the section. If a section leader endeavoured to follow the formation leader (Wing Commander Kellet) to the detriment of their section, the formation would break apart. Bomber formations were built on the idea of mutual protection, so if the formation came apart, each bomber would have to fend for itself, which would enable an enemy to pick off the bombers one by one. Guthrie and Hue-Williams did not heed this advice; Kellett had followed the notes and he lost only one aircraft. Harris had also kept his formation together and lost no Wellingtons. Within a few weeks, a debate began on shifting air attacks to the cover of darkness, with Hewitt favouring this alternative.

Another issue that was raised by the mission was the lack of useful bombsights. At the time, the RAF was using the Course Setting Bomb Sight (CSBS), originally developed in World War I for aircraft flying at much lower speeds against poorly defended targets. At an already-scheduled meeting on 22 December 1939, Air Chief Marshal Sir Edgar Ludlow-Hewitt noted that the CSBS demanded that the aircraft fly a straight path for a relatively long period of time prior to the drop, which made attacking targets of opportunity difficult, as well as making targeting by anti-aircraft gunners easier which were attacking non-maneuvering targets. He requested a new design that required a shorter time to settle and would allow maneuvering throughout the bomb run. This requirement led to the Mark XIV bomb sight, which was the RAF standard from 1942 on.

=== German assessment ===
Tactically, the Germans noted lessons and weaknesses of the RAF fleet they were already aware of, particularly the nose and tail turrets of the Wellington bombers not being capable of giving adequate cover against beam attacks; the bombers' rigid formation flying had favoured the fighters, allowing them to choose the position and angle of attack. The German report also regarded the attempt by the RAF to attack in clear conditions and perfect visibility at altitudes of 10,000–16,000 ft (3,000–4,900 m) as "criminal folly". Schumacher stated that anti-aircraft fire proved effective at breaking up formations and damaging bombers which provided better opportunities for the fighter pilots.

After the recent Polish Campaign, the German Army staff analysis had been rigorous in its analysis of that battle. The Army General Staff had assessed the problems of leadership, tactics, command and control to improve effectiveness. It appears that Schumacher's fighter units did not do the same and were too busy congratulating themselves on their success. Little evidence exists that the Luftwaffe took anything like the Army's approach in Poland, following its own victory at Heligoland Bight. The historian for the Luftwaffe General Staff noted it was only exploited for propaganda, despite the operational problems and warnings the battle had flagged for attacker and defender.

The progress of the war from September 1939 to the summer of 1941, with a few exceptions, seemed to validate the Luftwaffe's pre-war focus on the offensive use of its fighter arm. The success of the Luftwaffe in the Norwegian Campaign and the battles of the Netherlands, Belgium, France, Yugoslavia, and Greece had vindicated this method. The Luftwaffe had defended German airspace by driving away enemy air power from Germany's borders and defeating its enemies in its own skies. The occupation of its opponent's territory denied Germany's enemies the bases to attack German targets by air. German daylight defences were rarely tested during this time. This run of events and the knowledge that the RAF was capable of only short penetrations over France in daylight led the Luftwaffe to believe that Germany was invulnerable to attack. To maintain the offensive on the front line, bomber production dominated the air industry while the production of fighters was given less priority.

By the time Germany declared war on the United States, on 11 December 1941, the failure of Operation Barbarossa meant the Luftwaffe's method of concentrating all its resources on the front line was failing. The RAF began its campaign of night bombing in early 1940 and by mid-August 1942, the United States Army Air Forces (USAAF) entered the air war in force. Even so, the OKL continued to resist sending its forces to defend Germany and weakening the front lines. It was only in May 1942—when the Luftwaffe faced the USAAF for the first time in daylight engagements and the commencement of USAAF 8th Air Force bombing raids on occupied Europe—that the danger of Allied strategic bombing by day gave the OKL cause for concern. Even by the end of 1942, the measures taken to strengthen daylight anti-aircraft defences remained piecemeal and counterproductive. Hans Jeschonnek summed up the attitude of the OKL when he stated that the Luftwaffe could deal with the Western Allies' daylight raids with "one" fighter wing. The events of 1943–1944 would prove this assumption wrong. Adolf Galland—General der Jagdflieger (General of the Fighter Force), 1941–1945—gave lack of organisation and of planning for air defence as one of the greatest mistakes made by the Luftwaffe during the war.

== Other sources ==
- "Bombs on Esbjerg; Britain expresses regret". Australian Western. 8 September 1939.
- "Esbjerg blev bombet af England 4. september 1939" (in Danish). Unyttige Historiefacts. 4 February 2023.
