= German Air Fleets in World War II =

A list of Luftwaffe "Luftflotten" (Air Fleets) and their locations between 1939 and 1945.

== 1939 ==
Before the invasion of Poland.

- Luftflotte 1 (Northeast Germany)
- Luftflotte 2 (Northwest Germany)
- Luftflotte 3 (Southwest Germany)
- Luftflotte 4 (Southeast Germany and Austria)

== 1940 ==
Luftwaffe Order of Battle August 1940.

- Luftflotte 1 (Poland)
- Luftflotte 2 (The Netherlands, Belgium, Northern Germany)
- Luftflotte 3 (France, Luxembourg, Middle Germany)
- Luftflotte 4 (Austria and Czech Republic)
- Luftflotte 5 (Norway and Denmark)

== 1942 ==
During operations on the Eastern and African fronts.

- Luftflotte 1 (Russian Northern front)
- Luftflotte 2 (North Africa, Southern Italy and Greece)
- Luftflotte 3 (France, the Netherlands and Belgium)
- Luftflotte 4 (Black Sea coast, Ukraine, the Caucasus)
- Luftflotte 5 (Norway and Finland)
- Luftflotte 6 (Central Russian front, Belarus)

== 1944 ==
During the last stages of the Eastern front, the Balkans, North Italy and West area.

- Luftflotte 1 (Baltic coasts)
- Luftflotte 2 (Northern Italy)
- Luftflotte 3 (France, Belgium and the Netherlands)
- Luftflotte 4 (Hungary, Yugoslavia, Bulgaria and Romania)
- Luftflotte 5 (Norway and Finland)
- Luftflotte 6 (Russian Central front, Belarus)
- Luftflotte Reich Deutschland (Germany)
- Luftflotte 10 (Ergänzungs- und Ausbildungseinheiten; replacement and training units) (Berlin)

== 1945 ==
During the last period of conflict on the European front.

- Luftflotte 1 (Lithuania)
- Luftflotte 2 (Northern Italy)
- Luftflotte 3 (West Germany and the Netherlands)
- Luftflotte 4 (Hungary and Yugoslavia)
- Luftflotte 5 (Norway and Finland)
- Luftflotte 6 (East Germany)
- Luftflotte Reich (Central Germany)
- Luftflotte 10 (Berlin)

== See also ==
- Luftwaffe Organization
