= Günther Scholz =

German Lutwaffe aviator (1911–2014)

- Born: 8 December 1911
- Died: 24 October 2014 (aged 102)
- Military career
- Allegiance: Nazi Germany
- Branch: Luftwaffe
- Unit: Condor Legion
- Commands: Jagdgeschwader 5 Jagdfliegerführer Norwegen
- Known for: Last surviving veteran of the Condor Legion
- Conflicts: Spanish Civil War; World War II: Battle of France; Battle of Britain; Operation Barbarossa
- Awards: German Cross in Gold

Günther Scholz (8 December 1911 – 24 October 2014) was a German Luftwaffe military aviator and wing commander during World War II, and was the last surviving member of the Condor Legion during the Spanish Civil War. He later participated in the Battle of Britain and commanded Jagdgeschwader 5 (JG 5—5th Fighter Wing) during World War II. He had accumulated at least 33 "kills" during his time of service. His memoirs are documented in the book In the Skies over Europe.

== Career ==
On 1 September 1943, Scholz was promoted to Geschwaderkommodore (Wing Commander) of JG 5 thus succeeding Oberstleutnant Gotthard Handrick. Scholz's previous position of Gruppenkommandeur (Group Commander) of III. Gruppe of JG 5 was backfilled by Hauptmann (captain) Heinrich Ehrler. On 1 August 1944, Scholz was given the position of Jagdfliegerführer Norwegen. In consequence of this decision, Major Ehrler again succeeded Scholz in his previous command position of Geschwaderkommodore of JG 5. At the time of his death, he was the last known surviving Lieutenant Colonel of the Wehrmacht.

== Summary of career ==
=== Aerial victory claims ===
Mathews and Foreman, authors of Luftwaffe Aces — Biographies and Victory Claims, researched the German Federal Archives and state that Scholz was credited with 33 aerial victories. This figure includes one claim during the Spanish Civil War, eight claims during the Battle of France and Battle of Britain on the Western Front, eighteen claims during Operation Barbarossa and six further claims at the Arctic Sea of the Eastern Front.

Victory claims were logged to a map-reference (PQ = Planquadrat), for example "PQ 36 Ost 2912". The Luftwaffe grid map (Jägermeldenetz) covered all of Europe, western Russia and North Africa and was composed of rectangles measuring 15 minutes of latitude by 30 minutes of longitude, an area of about 360 square miles (930 km^{2}). These sectors were then subdivided into 36 smaller units to give a location area 3 km × 4 km (1.9 mi × 2.5 mi) in size.

Chronicle of aerial victories
| Claim | Date | Time | Type | Location | Claim | Date | Time | Type | Location |
– 3. Staffel of Jagdgruppe 88 – Spanish Civil War
| 1 | 19 August 1938 | — | I-16 | | | | | | |
– 1. Staffel of Jagdgeschwader 21 – Battle of France — 10 May – 25 June 1940
| 2 | 13 May 1940 | 06:50 | Hawk 75 | east of Leuven | 4 | 26 May 1940 | 09:06 | Hawk 75 | vicinity of Lens/Douai |
| 3 | 20 May 1940 | 18:22 | M.S.406 | west of Péronne | 5 | 26 May 1940 | 09:16 | Hawk 75 | vicinity of Lens/Douai |
– 7. Staffel of Jagdgeschwader 54 – Action at the Channel and over England — 26 June – 5 September 1940
| 6 | 25 August 1940 | 20:10 | Spitfire | west of Folkestone | 8 | 2 September 1940 | 13:55 | Spitfire | |
| 7 | 28 August 1940 | 17:20 | Hurricane | | | | | | |
– Stab III. Gruppe of Jagdgeschwader 54 – Action at the Channel and over England — 5 September – 27 October 1940
| 9 | 28 September 1940 | 11:07 | Spitfire | | | | | | |
– 7. Staffel of Jagdgeschwader 54 – Operation Barbarossa — 22 June – 5 December 1941
| 10 | 23 June 1941 | 11:50 | SB-2 | | 19 | 12 July 1941 | 16:00 | DB-3 | |
| 11 | 30 June 1941 | 12:10 | DB-3 | | 20 | 14 July 1941 | 03:30 | I-16 | |
| 12 | 30 June 1941 | 12:12 | DB-3 | | 21 | 21 July 1941 | 20:55 | SB-3 | |
| 13 | 30 June 1941 | 12:14 | DB-3 | | 22 | 1 August 1941 | 19:05 | DB-3 | |
| 14 | 6 July 1941 | 10:00 | SB-3 | east of Ostrov | 23 | 19 September 1941 | 14:00 | I-153 | |
| 15 | 6 July 1941 | 10:07 | SB-3 | east of Ostrov | 24 | 26 September 1941 | 16:07 | MiG-1 | |
| 16 | 7 July 1941 | 15:40 | SB-3 | | 25 | 30 September 1941 | 15:40 | I-153 | |
| 17 | 7 July 1941 | 15:41 | SB-3 | | 26 | 4 October 1941 | 08:35 | I-18 (MiG-1) | |
| 18 | 10 July 1941 | 09:15 | SB-3 | east of Pskov | 27 | 11 October 1941 | 11:10 | I-26 (Yak-1) | |
– III. Gruppe of Jagdgeschwader 5 – Arctic Front
| 28 | 6 February 1942 | 11:10 | P-40 | | 31 | 14 July 1942 | 12:35 | Hurricane | Murmansk vicinity of Murmashi |
| 29 | 24 March 1942 | 18:25 | Hurricane | | 32 | 12 August 1942 | 14:30 | MiG-1 | PQ 36 Ost 2912 |
| 30 | 18 May 1942 | 10:25 | Hurricane | 20 km (12 mi) west of Murmansk | 33 | 18 August 1943 | 16:24 | P-40 | west of Cap Korabelnyj |

=== Awards ===
- German Cross in Gold on 8 September 1942

| Preceded by Oberstleutnant Gotthard Handrick | Commander of Jagdgeschwader 5 "Eismeer"; 1 September 1943 – 26 July 1944 | Succeeded by Major Heinrich Ehrler |
| Preceded by Oberstleutnant Gerhard Schöpfel | Commander of Jagdfliegerführer Norwegen; May 1944 – May 1945 | Succeeded by disbanded |
| Preceded by Major Heinrich Ehrler | Commander of Jagdgeschwader 5 "Eismeer"; January 1945 – May 1945 | Succeeded by disbanded |
