= Jagdgeschwader 5 =

- Active: 1942–45
- Country: Nazi Germany
- Branch: Luftwaffe
- Type: Fighter Aircraft
- Role: Air superiority
- Size: Air Force Wing
- Nickname: Eismeer

Commanders
- Notable commanders: Heinrich Ehrler (May 1944 - February 1945)

Jagdgeschwader 5 (JG 5) Eismeer was a German Luftwaffe fighter wing during World War II. It was created to operate in the far north of Europe, namely Norway, Scandinavia and northern parts of Finland, all nearest the Arctic Ocean, with Luftflotte 5, created specifically to be based in occupied Norway, and responsible for much of northern Norway.

The name Eismeer means the Arctic Sea in German language.

== Formation ==
In 1942, the Luftwaffe reorganized its fighter units based in Norway and Finland. In this context, the new fighter wing Jagdgeschwader 5 (JG 5—5th Fighter Wing) was created, the wing was later referred to as "Eismeergeschwader" (Arctic Sea Fighter Wing). Creation of JG 5 happened in three stages, in January, March and July 1942. On 10 January, the Stab (headquarters unit) of Jagdfliegerführer Norwegen was detached and formed the Geschwaderstab of JG 5. At the same time a new Stab of Jagdfliegerführer Norwegen was created and placed under the command of Oberst (Colonel) Carl-Alfred Schumacher. Major Gotthard Handrick received the command position of Geschwaderkommodore (wing commander) of JG 5. However, Handrick assumed command of JG 5 in late April 1942. Until then, Schumacher acted in his behalf.

=== I. Gruppe ===
On 3 January 1942, I. Gruppe (1st group) of Jagdgeschwader 77 (JG 77—77th Fighter Wing), already stationed in Norway, was renamed to I. Gruppe and assigned to JG 5. The Gruppenstab remained unchanged and was commanded by Major Joachim Seegert. 1. Staffel (1st squadron) of JG 77 was renamed to 1. Staffel of JG 5, 2./JG 77 to 2./JG 5 and 3./JG 77 to 3./JG 5.

=== II. Gruppe ===
In 1941, Luftflotte 5 (5th Air Fleet) had created Jagdgruppe z.b.V. (JGr z.b.V.—zur besonderen Verwendung), a fighter group for special deployment, under the command of Major Henning Strümpell. On 3 January 1942, JGr z.b.V. became the nucleus of II. Gruppe of JG 5. The 13. Staffel of JG 77 was renamed to 4./JG 5. The 5. Staffel was officially created from 15. Staffel of JG 77, a squadron which had just been created. Creation of 6. Staffel was deferred until mid-March 1942. On 21 March, 1./JG 5 was renamed and became 6./JG 5. Shortly later, a new 1./JG 5 was created from 10. Staffel of Jagdgeschwader 1 (JG 1—1st Fighter Wing).

=== III. Gruppe ===
In January 1942, various residual Ergänzungsjagdgruppen, supplementary fighter groups of multiple fighter wings, were consolidated in Vannes, France and formed IV. Gruppe (4th group) of JG 1 with three squadrons named 10., 11. and 12. Staffel. IV. Gruppe first major task was Operation Donnerkeil, an air superiority operation to support the Kriegsmarine's (German Navy) Operation Cerberus. The objective of this assignment was to give the German battleships Scharnhorst and Gneisenau and the heavy cruiser Prinz Eugen fighter protection in the breakout from Brest to Germany. End-February to early March 1942, IV. Gruppe began relocating north to Trondheim. On 21 March, IV./JG 1 was renamed to III. Gruppe of JG 5 and placed under the command of Hauptmann (Captain) Günther Scholz.

7. Staffel (7th squadron) of JG 5 was created from the Ergänzungsjagdgruppe 3 of Jagdgeschwader 3 (JG 3—3rd Fighter Wing). On 31 December 1941, the Ergänzungsjagdgruppe 3 was detached from JG 3 and subordinated as an autonomous Staffel to Jagdfliegerführer Norwegen. On 24 April 1942, 7. Staffel arrived in Pechenga, also referred to as Petsamo, where it was subordinated to III. Gruppe. 8. Staffel had its roots in the Ergänzungsjagdgruppe of Jagdgeschwader 26 (JG 26—26th Fighter Wing) which had been created on 22 June 1941. On 27 January 1941, the Staffel became 11./JG 1 and was moved to Trondheim-Lade on 6 March. There it was renamed to 8./JG 5.

== 1942 ==
Other elements came from Jagdgeschwader 1 in May. The unit had the responsibility for providing fighter-cover over occupied territories under Luftflotte 5, and also to provide fighter support for the German Army units fighting on the Arctic front in the Murmansk area.

at the start of the polar summer of 1942, Luftflotte 5 had been reinforced and by July 1942 possessed a total of 250 serviceable aircraft. Due to the air superiority established by II. and III./JG 5 early in the year, Luftflotte 5 enjoyed a numerical and considerable qualitative superiority, and the Soviet opposition amounted to just 170 serviceable combat aircraft. The command also benefited from an early-warning Freya radar network.

During the summer the Soviet air force brought in new units, including 20 IAP equipped with the new Yakovlev Yak-1, an effective counter to the Bf 109F. Luftflotte 5 recorded 26 combat losses in July 1942, while the VVS lost 32 of its own aircraft shot down or missing, mainly to JG 5. On 21 August, 6./JG 5 claimed 14 Soviet fighters shot down. According to Soviet records, 2 LaGG-3s and 2 I-16s were shot down over Vayenga and two aircraft made forced landings. JG 5 lost two Bf 109s, one was posted missing. JG 5 claimed some 72 victories in August, but Soviet records indicate 24 Soviet aircraft lost with another 7 damaged and 13 aircraft missing, and another 4 were shot down by ground fire. For the rest of 1942, elements of the unit were stationed in Trondheim and Kirkenes, from where they undertook attacks on the Arctic convoys.

== 1943 ==
By January 1943, the units of the wing were stationed in southern Norway and Finland and were equipped with the Focke-Wulf Fw 190 aircraft. Mid-1943 saw JG 5 at its maximum strength, consisting of 14 Staffeln; 12 regular single-engined fighter Staffeln equipped with the Bf 109 and Fw 190, one Bf 110-equipped Zerstörerstaffel, and the Jabo unit, 14.(J)/JG 5 with the Fw 190A under the command of Hauptmann Friedrich-Wilhelm Strakeljahn. 1943 was also the last year in which JG 5's four Gruppen operated as a single unit. I and II. Gruppe left Norway and Finland in late 1943 to fight the rest of the war away from their parent Geschwader.

In the spring of 1943, some of the subcommanders of JG 5 were as follows: Gruppenkommandeur IV./JG 5 was Hauptmann Hans Kriegel, Staffelkapitän of 10./JG 5 was Oberleutnant Hans Schneider and Staffelkapitän of 11./JG5 was Hauptmann Erich Schreiber. In mid-1943, half of the 70 to 80 fighters of JG 5, contained in I Gruppe were based above the Arctic Circle, protecting supply-shipping.

On 1 September 1943, Major Günther Scholz succeeded Oberstleutnant Gotthard Handrick as Geschwaderkommodore (Wing Commander) of JG 5.

In November 1943, I./JG 5 was moved to Romania as protection for the Ploieşti oil refineries. It was placed under the command of Luftflotte 1 and then redesignated as III./JG 6; it was not replaced. IV./JG 5 was stationed on the Arctic Front and then in Southern Norway. Up to the end of the war, this unit formed the air defence against the Allied raids on the submarine bases at Trondheim and Bergen in Norway.

== 1944 ==
On 1 August 1944, Heinrich Ehrler was appointed Geschwaderkommodore of JG 5, replacing Oberstleutnant Scholz who was given the position of Jagdfliegerführer Norwegen.

On 12 November 1944 Avro Lancaster bombers of RAF Squadrons 9 and 617 attacked the Tirpitz in Tromsø fjord. Ehrler, commanding officer of JG 5, scrambled a formation to intercept, but the German fighters were too late. The Tirpitz was sunk with the loss of a thousand sailors. Ehrler was court-martialed; he was sentenced to three years imprisonment and stripped of his command. Ehrler was later reinstated; he was killed flying with JG 7 on 4 April 1945. Karl Dönitz was the driving force behind the conviction. Only Ehrler's record as a fighter pilot saved him from execution.

== 1945 ==
In early January 1945 and following Ehrler's conviction by the Reichskriegsgericht, Oberstleutnant Scholz, in addition to his obligations as Jagdfliegerführer Norwegen in Stavanger-Forus, assumed command of JG 5 again.

The German surrender at Lüneburg Heath is signed on 4 May 1945. All German armed forces in the Netherlands, in northwestern Germany, including the Frisian Islands and Heligoland and all other islands, as well forces in Schleswig-Holstein and in Denmark, lay down their arms and to surrender unconditionally. This surrender includes the last German soldiers in Norway as well as JG 5. In total, pilots of JG 5 claimed approximately 3,200 aerial victories during World War II. At the end of hostilities, losses had amounted to 435 men either killed in action or taken prisoner of war.

== Commanding officers ==
=== Geschwaderkommodore ===
• Oberst Carl-Alfred Schumacher	10 January 1942	–	March 1942
• Oberstleutnant Gotthard Handrick	March 1942	–	31 August 1943
• Oberstleutnant Günther Scholz	1 September 1943	–	26 July 1944
• Major Heinrich Ehrler	1 August 1944	–	December 1944
• Oberstleutnant Günther Scholz	January 1945	–	8 May 1945

Gruppenkommandeure

=== Gruppenkommandeure ===
==== I. Gruppe of JG 5 ====
Formerly the I. Gruppe of JG 77, re-designated to II. Gruppe of Jagdgeschwader 6 on 15 October 1944:

• Hauptmann Walter Grommes	1 February 1941	–	19 June 1941
• Major Joachim Seegert	28 June 1941	–	20 March 1942
• Hauptmann Gerhard von Wehren	March 1942	–	31 March 1943
• Hauptmann Gerhard Wengel	1 April 1943	–	10 January 1944
• Major Erich Gerlitz	25 January 1944	–	16 March 1944
• Oberleutnant Robert Müller (acting)	17 March 1944	–	15 April 1944
• Major Horst Carganico	16 April 1944	–	27 May 1944 †
• Hauptmann Theodor Weissenberger	4 June 1944	–	14 October 1944

==== III. Gruppe of JG 5 ====
Formerly the IV. Gruppe of JG 1:

• Hauptmann Günther Scholz	21 March 1942	–	31 August 1943
• Major Heinrich Ehrler	1 September 1943	–	31 July 1944
• Hauptmann Franz Dörr	1 August 1944	–	8 May 1945

== Other members ==
=== Ernst Scheufele ===
Ernst Scheufele (died 2010) was a Luftwaffe fighter ace during World War II, attached to JG 5. He was credited with 18 victories. He flew 67 escort missions for German Bismark-class battleships and German Tirpitz-class Battleships.
