= Jagdfliegerführer Norwegen =

- Active: 1941–45
- Country: Norway
- Branch: Luftwaffe
- Role: Occupation of Norway by Nazi Germany; Operation Silver Fox, as part of Operation Barbarossa.

Jagdfliegerführer Norwegen was a formation of the German Luftwaffe based in Occupied Norway during World War II. It was named for the "Fighter Leader (Jafu), Norway" and referred to the units under his command.

== Service history ==
Jafu Norwegen was formed in June 1941 from units of Jagdgeschwader 5 (JG 5) and was responsible for fighter operations in defence of Occupied Norway. It was subordinated to Luftflotte 5, and located at Forus, near Stavanger. Other units of JG 5 were assigned to operations in support of the invasion of the Soviet Union in the north and were under the command of Fliegerfuehrer Nord Ost. By 1943 Jafu Norwegen had three squadrons (Staffel) of JG 5 under control, based at Trondheim, Gossen, Lade, Stavanger, and Herdla. In 1944 had acquired a night fighter unit, based at Lista. Following the collapse of the Northern Front, Jafu Norwegen was re-united with JG 5 on March 16, 1945.

== Commanding officers ==
- Generalmajor Walter Grabmann (June – 31 July 1941)
- Generalmajor Carl-August Schumacher (5 January 1942 – 30 April 1943)
- Oberstleutnant Gerhard Schöpfel (1 May 1943 – 30 April 1944)
- Oberstleutnant Günther Scholz (May 1944 – May 1945)
