= Carl-Alfred Schumacher =

German military officer and politician

- Born: 19 February 1896; Rheine, German Empire
- Died: 22 May 1967 (aged 71); Bad Godesberg, West Germany
- Military career
- Allegiance: German Empire (to 1918); Weimar Republic (to 1933); Nazi Germany; Federal Republic of Germany
- Branch: Imperial German Army; Imperial German Navy; Luftwaffe
- Service years: 1914–1919; 1933–1945
- Rank: Generalmajor (brigadier general)
- Service number: NSDAP 345,013
- Commands: II./JG 77, JG 1, Jafü Norwegen
- Conflicts: World War I: Battle of Jutland; World War II: Battle of the Heligoland Bight
- Awards: Knight's Cross of the Iron Cross
- Other work

Leader of the Military Administration of Luxembourg
- In office 11 May 1940 – 10 July 1940
- Appointed by: Adolf Hitler
- Preceded by: Office established
- Succeeded by: Gustav Simon

Carl-Alfred (August) Schumacher (Note: Some sources such as Forsyth "Jagdgeschwader 1 'Oesau' Aces 1939–45", Page "Day Fighter Aces of the Luftwaffe 1943–45", or Heaton, Lewis, Olds and Schulze in "The German Aces Speak: World War II Through the Eyes of Four of the Luftwaffe's Most Important Commanders" refer to him as Carl-August Schumacher.) (19 February 1896 – 22 May 1967) was a German military officer and politician. During World War II, Schumacher served in the German Luftwaffe, commanding the Jagdgeschwader 1 (JG 1) fighter wing. After World War II, Schumacher was an active politician and member of the All-German Bloc/League of Expellees and Deprived of Rights (GB/BHE), German Party (DP) and Christian Democratic Union of Germany (CDU). From 1952 to 1963, he was an elected member of the Landtag in Lower Saxony.

== Early life and career ==
Schumacher was born on 19 February 1896 in Rheine at the time in the Province of Westphalia within the German Empire. He attended the Volksschule from 1902 to 1905 and then a Realgymnasium—a secondary school built on the mid-level Realschule—where he graduated with his Abitur (university entry qualification). Following the outbreak of World War I, Schumacher volunteered for military service with the 1. Westfälisches Feldartillerie-Regiment Nr. 7 (1st Westphalian Field Artillery Regiment No. 7) on 10 August 1914. From February to December 1915, he served with the Klevesches Feldartillerie-Regiment Nr. 43 (Kleve Field Artillery Regiment No. 43 ).

In early January 1916, Schumacher transferred to the Imperial German Navy where he was promoted to Fähnrich zur See (Ensign) in mid July 1917. Until October 1917, Schumacher then received air observer and radio communication training with the I. Seeflieger-Abteilung (1st Naval Flier Department). After completing his training, he served as an observer and pilot at the airfields at Wyk auf Föhr, Föhr, Aabenraa, Saaremaa and Bug. He was promoted to Leutnant zur See (Second Lieutenant) on 17 March 1918. In September 1918, Schumacher was posted to the seaplane tender SMH Answald where he briefly served as an observation officer before transferring to the Groß-Flugzeugstaffel-Ostsee (Greater Aircraft Squadron Baltic Sea).

Schumacher joined the Nazi Party (NSDAP—National Socialist German Workers' Party) on 1 November 1930 with a membership number 345,013. On 1 March 1933, he joined the newly emerging Luftwaffe with the rank of Oberleutnant (first lieutenant). Until late April 1934, he served with the staff of the Deutsche Verkehrsfliegerschule (German Air Transport School) in Berlin where he was promoted to Hauptmann (captain) on 1 October 1933. On 1 August 1936 he was given a squadron command in I. Gruppe of Jagdgeschwader 136 (JG 136—136th Fighter Wing), he was subsequently promoted to Major (major) on 1 August 1936. On 29 September 1937, Schumacher was appointed Gruppenkommandeur (group commander) of I. Gruppe of JG 136, succeeding Major Hermann Edert. This unit was subsequently renamed II. Gruppe of Jagdgeschwader 333 (JG 333—136th Fighter Wing) on 1 November 1938, and again on 1 May 1939 to II. Gruppe of Jagdgeschwader 77 (JG 333—136th Fighter Wing). During this assignment he was promoted to Oberstleutnant (lieutenant colonel) on 1. March 1939.

== World War II ==
Following the German invasion of Poland in September 1939, Schumacher was appointed Jagdfliegerführer Deutsche Bucht (Jafü Deutsche Bucht—Fighter-commander German Bight) in October, to control all the disparate fighter units stationed on the northern coast. In November he was then given orders to set up a brand new Geschwader. Initially (and unusually) comprising just a Stab or HQ Flight, called Stab./JG Nord, it was soon officially authorised as Jagdgeschwader 1 (JG 1—1st Fighter Wing) on 30 November 1939, with Schumacher as its first wing commander. It inherited command of I./JG 1 which had been previously operating without an HQ, and was also based at Jever on the northwest coast.

=== Battle of the Heligoland Bight ===
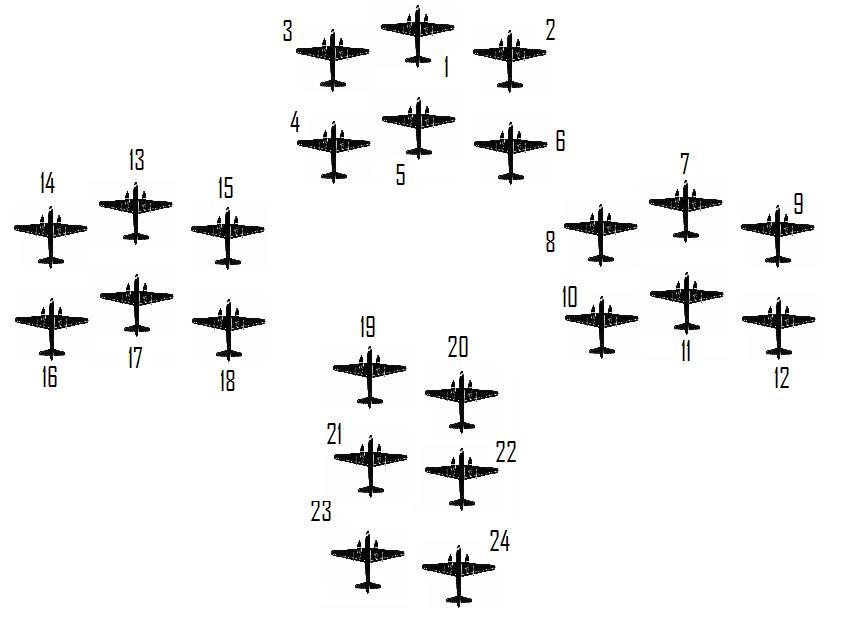
Formation 1 Section 1: 1 Richard Kellett 2 Turner 3 Speirs Section 2: 4 Kelly 5 Duguid 6 Riddlesworth Formation 2 Section 1: 7 Harris 8 Briden 9 Bolloch Section 2: 10 Ramshaw 11 Grant 12 Purdy Formation 3 Section 1: 13 Guthrie 14 Petts 15 McRae Section 2: 16 Challes 17 Allison 18 Lines Formation 4 19 Hue-Williams 20 Lemon 21 Wimberley 22 Lewis 23 Thompson 24 Ruse

During the first month of the war the Royal Air Force (RAF) mostly focused its bomber attacks on anti-shipping operations on the German Bight. RAF bombers mounted a heavy attack against shipping off Wilhelmshaven on 18 December 1939 in what became known as the Battle of the Heligoland Bight. Twenty-four twin-engine Vickers Wellington from No. 9 Squadron, No. 37 Squadron and No. 149 Squadron formed up over Norfolk heading for the island of Heligoland. Two aircraft aborted the mission due to mechanical defects, but the remaining 22 pursued the attack and were spotted by a Freya radar on the East Frisian Islands.

That day, Schumacher claimed his first aerial victory over a Vickers Wellington bomber, one of the 12 shot down during the aerial battles of the Heligoland Bight. He was credited with the destruction of the Wellington bomber piloted by Flying Officer P.A. Wimberley from No. 37 Squadron which crashed in the shallow sea off Borkum. Propaganda in Nazi Germany took advantage of this successful Luftwaffe operation. His co-ordination of a range of different units and aircraft was effective and forced a fundamental change in air strategy for the Royal Air Force (RAF), shifting air attacks to the cover of darkness. Schumacher claimed his second aerial victory, a Bristol Blenheim bomber, over the North Sea north of Langeoog at 14:02 on 27 December 1939.

He led his Geschwader in the Battle of the Netherlands, although his unit did not follow the armies in the invasion of France or the Battle of Britain, instead being kept back on the coast. For his outstanding leadership and success he was the very first fighter pilot awarded the Knight's Cross - on 21 July 1940. Because of that, and/or his lack of direct involvement in the Battle of Britain, he kept his role as a Geschwaderkommodore and was not dismissed by Hermann Göring in his purge of the senior fighter commanders a month later. On 8 April 1941, Schumacher crash landed his Messerschmitt Bf 109 E at the airfield Rom located approximately 2 kilometers (1.2 miles) south of Lemvig in Denmark.

=== Luftwaffe commander ===
In parallel to his position as Geschwaderkommodore of JG 1, Schumacher was appointed Jagdfliegerführer Norwegen on 1 August 1941. On 5 January 1942, he relinquished command of JG 1 to Major Erich von Selle. He retained his position as Jagdfliegerführer Norwegen, a role in which he coordinate a number of scattered units, this time across Norway, facing both the Soviet Arctic Front, the North Sea and Arctic Ocean. This subsequently also got further centralised with the formation of the new Jagdgeschwader 5 in May 1942.

On 1 May 1943, Schumacher was sent to Romania where he became head of the Luftwaffe mission to oversee the training of the Romanian Air Force. During this assignment, he was promoted to Generalmajor (brigadier general) on 1 January 1944. Finally, in the latter years of the war he was tasked with assignments co-ordinating the Defence of the Reich. On 30 January 1945, Schumacher was appointed chief of the National Socialist leadership staff in the Oberkommando der Luftwaffe within the Ministry of Aviation. He held this position until the end of World War II in Europe.

== Post-war career ==
Schumacher was a prisoner-of-war from 1945 to 1947. He was subsequently hired by the district President of Aurich in 1948 and was working for the Olympia-Werke AG, in the typewriter industry, starting 1951. He was elected member of the Landtag in Lower Saxony as deputy of the All-German Bloc/League of Expellees and Deprived of Rights (GB/BHE) faction in 1953 and re-elected in 1955. He then joined the Deutsche Partei (DP) in 1958 and changed to the Christian Democratic Union faction in 1962. He lost his mandate in 1963 and died in 1967.

== Awards ==
- Iron Cross (1939) 2nd and 1st class
- Knight's Cross of the Iron Cross on 21 July 1940 as Oberstleutnant and Geschwaderkommodore of Jagdgeschwader 1

== Notes ==
Military offices
Preceded by new	Commander of Jagdgeschwader 1; 30 November 1939 – 5 January 1942	Succeeded by Maj Erich von Selle
Preceded by none	Commander of Jagdfliegerführer Deutsche Bucht; 21 (or 12) December 1939 – 31 July 1941	Succeeded by GenLtn Werner Junck
Preceded by unknown	Commander of Jagdfliegerführer Norwegen; 5 January 1942 – 30 April 1944	Succeeded by ObtLt Gerhard Schöpfel
