= Jagdgeschwader 136 =

Fighter Wing 136
- Jagdgeschwader 136
- Country: Nazi Germany
- Branch: Luftwaffe

Jagdgeschwader 136 was a fighter wing of Nazi Germany's Luftwaffe during the interwar period. It was formed by 1 April 1936 without a wing staff by redesignating 1. and 2. Squadrons (Staffeln) of Coastal Fighter Squadron (Küstenjagdstaffel) 136.

== Bibliography ==
- Mombeek, Eric; Smith, J. Richard & Creek, Eddie J. (1999). Jagdwaffe: Birth of the Luftwaffe Fighter Force. Luftwaffe Colours. Vol. 1, Section 1. Classic Publications. ISBN 0-9526867-5-9.
