= Luftflotte 5 =

German military unit

Luftflotte 5 (Air Fleet 5) was one of the primary divisions of the German Luftwaffe in World War II. It was formed 12 April 1940 in Hamburg for the invasion of Norway. It transferred to Oslo, Norway on 24 April 1940 and was the organization responsible for Luftwaffe activity in Occupied Norway throughout the Second World War.

== History ==
Luftflotte 5 was responsible for German air operations during the invasion of Norway, and for the defence of the occupied territory thereafter. It was divided into various operational formations, governing air forces, and into Air Districts (Luftgau) controlling ground forces and facilities.

In 1940, for the invasion, its main air asset was Fliegerkorps X, a formation comprising four bomber and one fighter wings (Geschwader) together with air support forces. With the conclusion of the Norwegian campaign Fliegerkorps X was moved to other theatres (first to the Battle of Britain, then to the Mediterranean Sea).

On 15 August 1940 the Luftwaffe mounted the largest number of sorties of the Battle of Britain. Luftflotte 5 attacked the north of England. Believing Fighter Command strength to be concentrated in the south, raiding forces from Denmark and Norway ran into unexpectedly strong resistance. Inadequately escorted by Bf 110s, bombers were shot down in large numbers. North East England was attacked by 65 Heinkel He 111s escorted by 34 Messerschmitt Bf 110s, and RAF Driffield was attacked at midday by 50 unescorted Junkers Ju 88s. Out of 115 bombers and 35 fighters sent, 16 bombers and 7 fighters were destroyed. As a result of these casualties, Luftflotte 5 did not appear in strength again in the campaign.

After the invasion of Norway air operations came under Fliegerführer (Ff) Nord, an ad hoc formation of assigned squadrons (Staffel) and groups (Gruppe). From June 1941 fighter forces in Norway came under the separate command of Jagdfliegerführer Norwegen. Total forces amounted to three fighter groups and one bomber group, with attached night fighter and fighter bomber squadrons plus auxiliaries.

On the ground Luftflotte 5's assets were administered by a single air district, Luftgau Kommando(LgK) Norwegen, with subordinate commands operating airfields around Oslo, Kristiansand, Bergen, and Stavanger in the south, Trondheim, in the centre, and Narvik and Kirkenes in the north of the country.

In 1941, with the invasion of the Soviet Union and the entry of Finland into the war as Germany's ally, a second air district was formed (LgK Finnland) around Rovaniemi, to co-ordinate German air activity on the northern front and Operation Silberfuchs.

In June 1942 Ff Nord was divided into three separate commands; Ff Nord West ("North (West)"), organized from Trondheim; Ff Lofoten operating from the Lofoten Islands against Allied convoys to Murmansk and the Soviet arctic ports; and Ff Nord Ost ("North (East)"), supporting Army operations against Murmansk and the northern front. In the summer of 1942 Ff Lofoten was reinforced with two bomber groups formed specifically for maritime operations.

In 1944 these formations were reorganized again; Nord Ost became, briefly Ff Eismeer before becoming Ff 3; Nord West became Ff 4; and Lofoten became Ff 5.

On the ground LgK Norwegen became Kommandierende General der Luftwaffe (K.G.) in Norwegen, covering ground and air formations in Norway, while LgK Finnland became K.G. Finnland, with a similar remit in Finland and, later, northern Norway.

As the war progressed however these organizations became increasingly irrelevant as German forces were forced to retreat and their air strength diminished. By the end of World War II they existed largely on paper.

== Commanding officers ==
- Generalfeldmarschall Erhard Milch, 12 April 1940 – 9 May 1940
- Generaloberst Hans-Jürgen Stumpff, 10 May 1940 – 27 November 1943
- General Josef Kammhuber, 27 November 1943 – 16 September 1944
