= Murmashi =

Murmashi Мурмаши
- Urban-type settlement
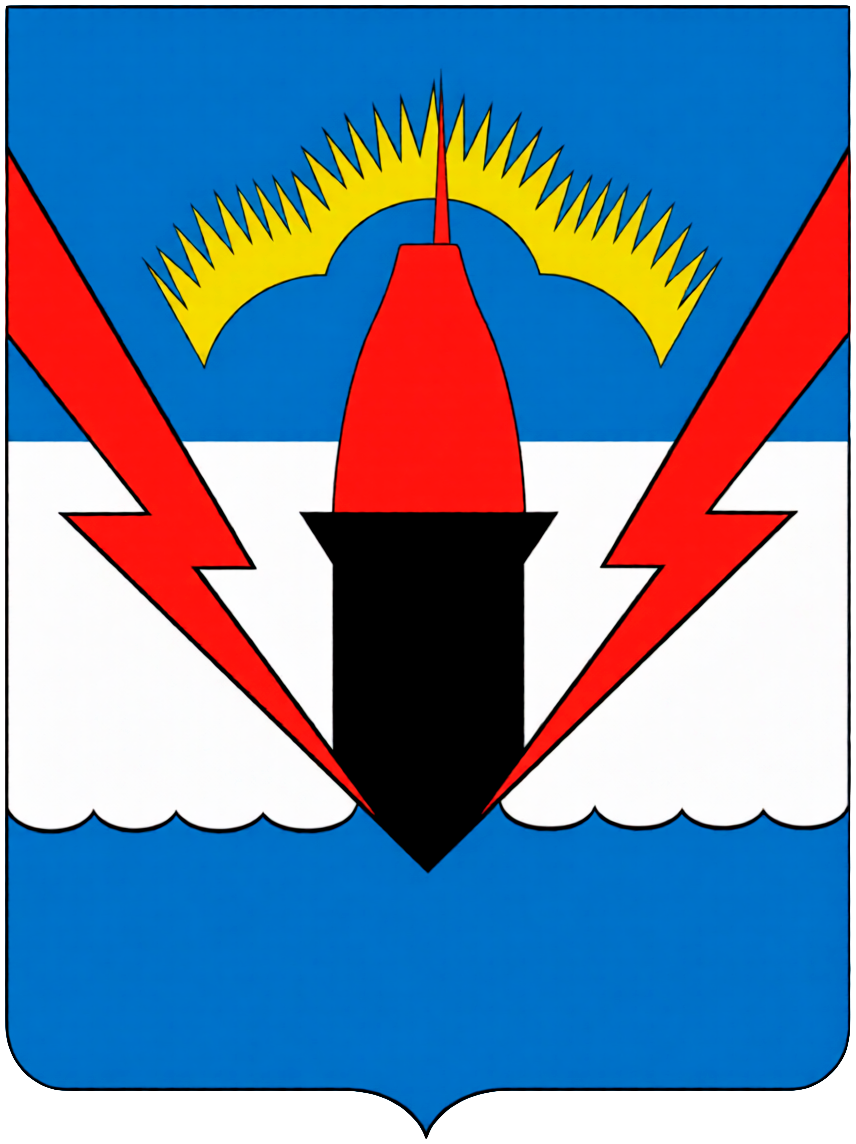
- Coat of arms
- Interactive map of Murmashi
- Location of Murmashi Murmashi (Murmansk Oblast)
- Coordinates: 68°49′00″N 32°49′59″E
- Country: Russia
- Federal subject: Murmansk Oblast
- Administrative district: Kolsky District
- Founded: 1938
- Elevation: 57 m (187 ft)

Population (2010 Census)
  - Total: 14,152
  - Estimate (2023): 9,449 (−33.2%)

Municipal status
  - Municipal district: Kolsky Municipal District
  - Urban settlement: Murmashi Urban Settlement
- Time zone: UTC+3 (MSK)
- Postal code: 184355
- Dialing code: +7 81553
- OKTMO ID: 47605163051

Murmashi (Russian: Мурмаши́) is an urban locality (an urban-type settlement) in Kolsky District of Murmansk Oblast, Russia, located on the Kola Peninsula on the lower Tuloma River, 23 kilometers (14 mi) southwest of Murmansk. Population: 14,152 (2010 census); 16,343 (2002 census); 14,312 (1989 Soviet census).

It was founded as a work settlement around 1930.

The Murmansk Airport is located near Murmashi.

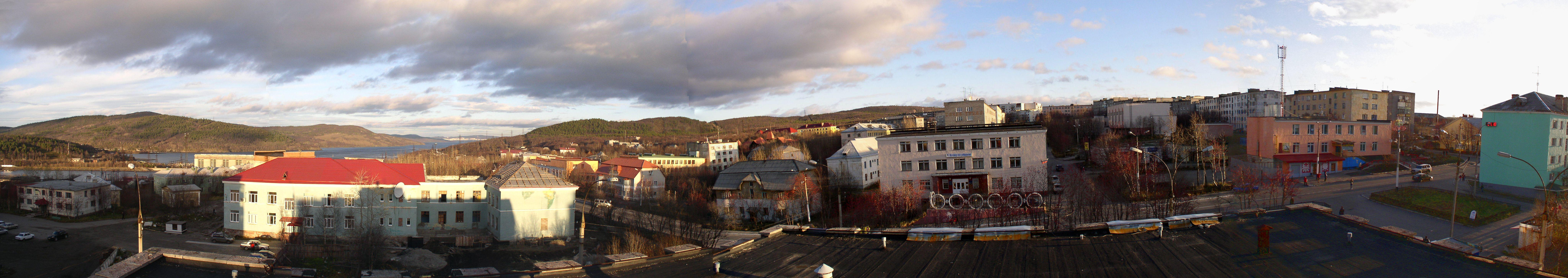
Panoramic view of Murmashi
