= List of World War II aces from Austria =

This is a list of flying aces in World War II from Austria. For other countries see List of World War II aces by country

== List ==
This and the / (slash) indicates information discrepancies listed by Caldwell, Foreman, Girbig, Mathews, Obermaier, Ring, Spick, and Zabecki.

| Name | Kills | Awards | Notes |
|---|---|---|---|
| Franz Achleitner | 5 | | |
| Johann Aistleitner | 13/11/12 | | KIA 14 January 1944 |
| Erwin Bacsilla | 34 | | |
| Heinrich Bartels | 99/94 | Knight's Cross of the Iron Cross | KIA 23 December 1944 |
| Herbert Bauer | 11 | Knight's Cross of the Iron Cross | |
| Oskar Bösch | 18 | | POW |
| Hermann Buchner | 58 | Knight's Cross of the Iron Cross | Me 262 pilot |
| Franz Ferdinand Colloredo-Mansfeld | 3 | | flew with RAF |
| Count Manfred Beckett Czernin | 18 | DFC, DSO, MC | Flew with RAF |
| Hans-Heinrich Döbrich | 65 | Knight's Cross of the Iron Cross | WIA 1943 |
| Leopold Fellerer | 41/36 | Knight's Cross of the Iron Cross | |
| Emmerich Fluder | 9 | | MIA 31 May 1942 |
| Josef Fözö | 27 (3 incl. Spain)/23 | Knight's Cross of the Iron Cross | WIFA 1942 |
| Bernd Gallowitsch | 64 | Knight's Cross of the Iron Cross | |
| Gordon Gollob | 150/146 | Knight's Cross of the Iron Cross with Oak Leaves, Swords and Diamonds | |
| Hartmann Grasser | 103/96+ | Knight's Cross of the Iron Cross with Oak Leaves | |
| Karl Gratz | 138 | Knight's Cross of the Iron Cross | |
| Josef Haiböck | 73 | Knight's Cross of the Iron Cross | WIA 1944 |
| Karl Hammerl | 67/63 | Knight's Cross of the Iron Cross | MIA 2 March 1943 |
| Josef Jennewein | 86/83 | Knight's Cross of the Iron Cross | MIA 27 July 1942 |
| Josef Kraft | 56 | Knight's Cross of the Iron Cross | |
| Egmont Prinz zur Lippe-Weißenfeld | 51 | Knight's Cross of the Iron Cross with Oak Leaves | KIFA 12 March 1944 |
| Alfred Lammer | 6 | DFC and Bar | as air gunner (later Navigator/Radar Operator) in RAF |
| Maximilian Mayerl | 76 | Knight's Cross of the Iron Cross | |
| Georg Michalek | 59 | Knight's Cross of the Iron Cross | |
| Walter Nowotny | 258/256 | Knight's Cross of the Iron Cross with Oak Leaves, Swords and Diamonds | KIA 8 November 1944 |
| Anton-Rudolf Piffer | 26 | Knight's Cross of the Iron Cross | KIA 17 June 1944 |
| Hubert Pölz | 11 | Knight's Cross of the Iron Cross with Oak Leaves | |
| Josef Pöhs | 43 | Knight's Cross of the Iron Cross | KIFA 30 December 1943 |
| Paul-Hubert Rauh | 31 | Knight's Cross of the Iron Cross | |
| Kurt Wilhelm Roehrich | 12 | | KIA 19 July 1944 |
| Theodor Rossiwall | 19 (incl. 2 in Spain) | Knight's Cross of the Iron Cross | |
| Johann Schalk | 15 | Knight's Cross of the Iron Cross | |
| Franz Schall | 137/133 | Knight's Cross of the Iron Cross | KIFA 10 April 1945 |
| Franz Schieß | 67 | Knight's Cross of the Iron Cross | KIA 2 September 1943 |
| Johann Schmid | 45 | Knight's Cross of the Iron Cross | MIA 6 November 1941 |
| Walter Schneider | 20 | | KIFA 22 December 1941 |
| Fritz Sengschmitt | 15 | | KIA 11 January 1944 |
| Rudolf Sinner | 39 | | |
| Kurt Sochatzy | 38 | Knight's Cross of the Iron Cross | |
| Leopold Steinbatz | 99/98 | Knight's Cross of the Iron Cross with Oak Leaves and Swords | KIA 15 June 1942 |
| Hans Stollnberger | 45 | Knight's Cross of the Iron Cross | |
| Max Stotz | 189/182 | Knight's Cross of the Iron Cross with Oak Leaves | MIA 19 August 1943 |
| Hubert Strassl | 67 | Knight's Cross of the Iron Cross | KIA 8 July 1943 |
| Egon Troha | 6 | Iron Cross | POW 1940 |
| Rüdiger von Kirchmayr | 20+ | | |
| Friedrich Graf von Uiberacker | 7 | | KIA 6 December 1942 |
| Alfred Wehmeyer | 18 | Knight's Cross of the Iron Cross | Killed AA 1 June 1942 |
| Robert Weiß | 121/122 | Knight's Cross of the Iron Cross with Oak Leaves | KIA 29 December 1944 |
| Ernst Weismann | 69 | Knight's Cross of the Iron Cross | MIA 13 August 1942 |
| Dr. Peter Werfft-Wessely | 26 | Knight's Cross of the Iron Cross | |
| Walter Zellot | 85/84 | Knight's Cross of the Iron Cross | KIA 10 September 1942 |
