= Uwe Benkel =

German researcher

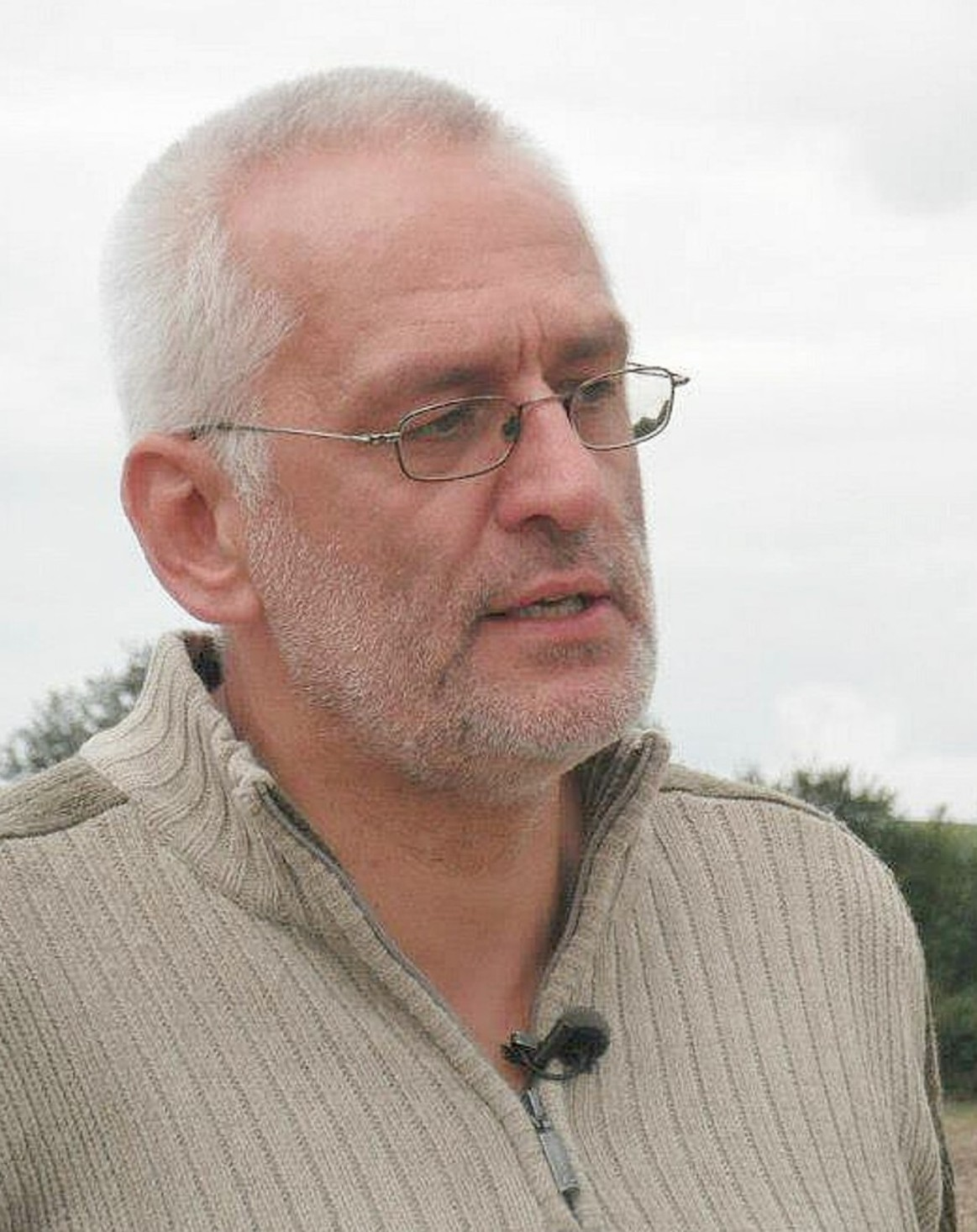
- Uwe Benkel in 2012
- Born: 23 December 1960 (age 64); Kaiserslautern, Germany
- Occupation: Non profit researcher for pilots

Uwe Benkel (born 23 December 1960 in Kaiserslautern) is a German non profit researcher for pilots who are missed in action. In more than 25 years, his Search Group for the Missing excavated more than 140 missing planes, with the remains of 50 crew members recovered.

== Life ==
Benkel was born in Kaiserslautern in 1960. Two of his father's brothers are missing from World War II. He is a health insurance employee and lives in Heltersberg. Benkel is married and has two children.

== Research ==
Impressed by the Ramstein air show disaster, Uwe Benkel founded the Arbeitsgruppe für Vermisstenforschung, a non profit group of researchers for missing pilots and crew members in 1989. The focus of the work is in Rhineland-Palatinate and Saarland. The members have located over 450 crash sites there. They were also active in all federal states and in the neighboring European area. The researchers are not interested in aerial warfare archeology. but the aim is to give missing planes of the belligerent nations their names and provide a decent burial site. In more than 25 years, his group dug out more than 140 missing planes, with the remains of 50 crew members recovered.

Benkel's supporters also include the actor Uwe Ochsenknecht, whose father bailed out as rear gunner from a Stuka Ju 87 on 18 July 1944. The pilot died. Benkel has recovered parts of the wreckage of the machine that crashed near Rheindürkheim.

In 2012, the group's greatest success was recovering the remains of a missing British Lancaster crew east of Laumersheim. In 2018, Benkel found remnants of Heinrich Ehrler's Me 262 and body. A recovery of the remains is planned, an event desperately awaited by Ehrler's relatives.

The following documentaries have so far been shown on German television: Der Geheimnisgräber - Der Schicksalsfahnder - Abgeschossen und Verschollen and Benkels Mission.

== Awards ==
- Verdienstmedaille des Landes Rheinland-Pfalz (1998)
- General George S. Patton Medal (2016)

== Publications ==
- Gefallen - vermisst, den Heltersberger Gefallenen, Vermissten und zivilen Opfern beider Weltkriege. „Damit sie nicht vergessen werden ...“.Heltersberg, 2008.
- Schauerberger Kriegsschicksale. Gefallen und vermisst auf Europas Schlachtfeldern. 1915–18 & 1942–45. Schauerberg 2013.
- „Abgeschossen und gefallen ... im Raum Homburg/Saar“, Dokumentation über Flugzeugabstürze im Raum Homburg/Saar. August 2015.
- „Was vom Krieg übrigblieb ...“ - Militärische Funde entlang der Rückzugsstraßen des Zweiten Weltkrieges - Verbandsgemeinde Waldfischbach-Burgalben. 2016.
- „Shot down and crashed ... in the area of Homburg/Saar“ - The search for WW II fallen Aircraft and Crews. 2016.
