= Heinrich Ehrler =

German World War II flying ace

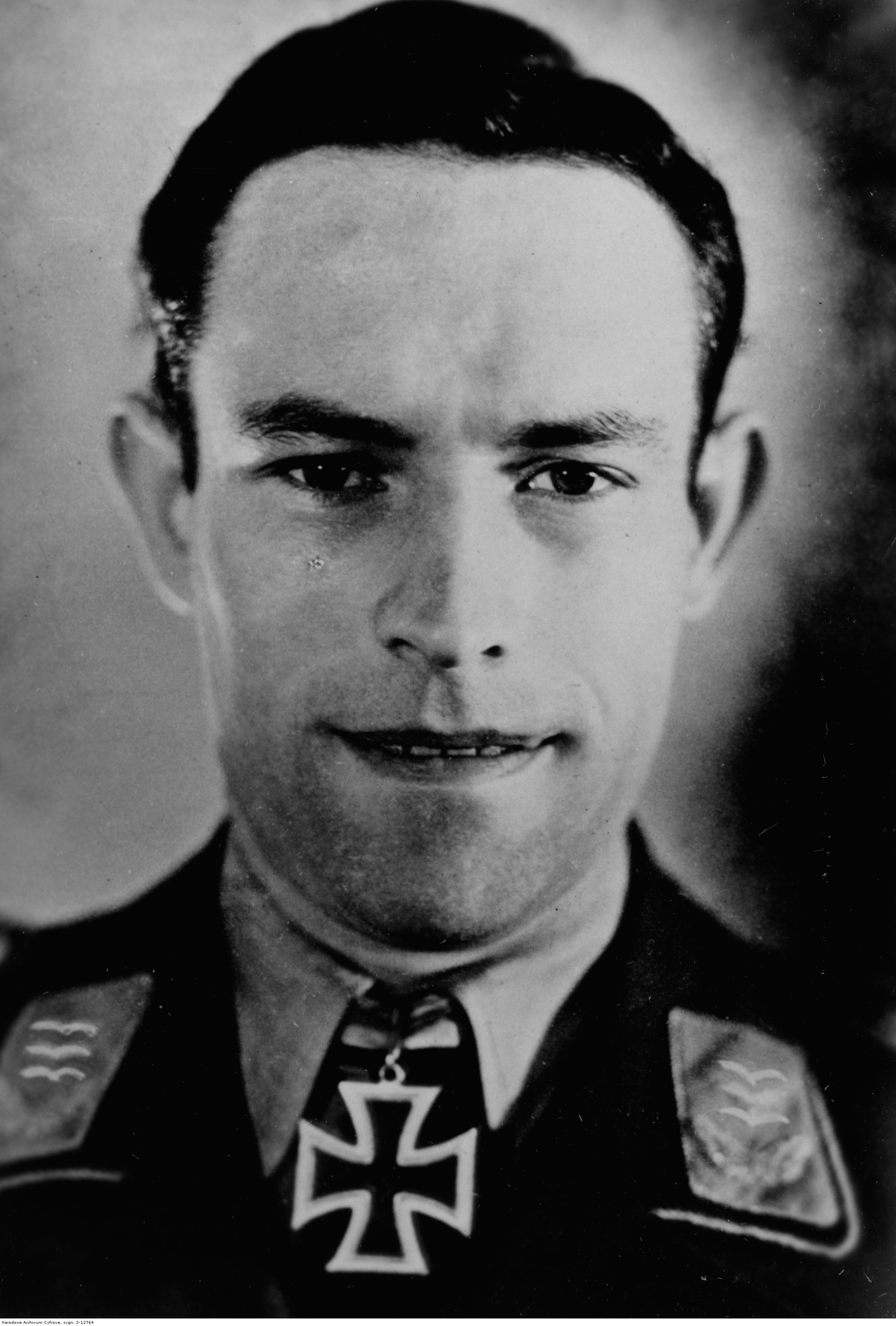
- Ehrler as a Hauptmann
- Born: 14 September 1917; Oberbalbach, Grand Duchy of Baden, German Empire
- Died: 4 April 1945 (aged 27); Stendal, Free State of Prussia, Nazi Germany
- Cause of death: Killed in action
- Military career
- Allegiance: Nazi Germany
- Branch: Luftwaffe
- Service years: 1935–1945
- Rank: Major (major)
- Units: JG 77, JG 5 and JG 7
- Commands: JG 5 "Eismeer"
- Conflicts: See battles Spanish Civil War World War II: Eastern Front; Arctic convoys; Petsamo–Kirkenes Offensive; Operation Catechism; Defense of the Reich †
- Awards: Knight's Cross of the Iron Cross with Oak Leaves

Heinrich Ehrler (14 September 1917 – 4 April 1945) was a German Luftwaffe military aviator and wing commander during World War II. As a fighter ace, he is credited with 208 enemy aircraft shot down in over 400 combat missions. The majority of his victories were claimed over the Eastern Front, with nine claims over the Western Front which included eight in the Messerschmitt Me 262 jet fighter.

Born in Oberbalbach, Ehrler grew up in the Weimar Republic and Nazi Germany as one of 12 children in his family. He joined the military service in the Wehrmacht in 1935, initially serving with the artillery and anti-aircraft artillery. He participated in the Spanish Civil War and following the outbreak of World War II transferred to the Jagdwaffe (fighter force). Following flight training, he was posted to the 4. Staffel of Jagdgeschwader 77 (JG 77–77th Fighter Wing), and later reassigned to 4. Staffel of Jagdgeschwader 5 (JG 5–5th Fighter Wing).

Scapegoated for the loss of the German battleship Tirpitz, Ehrler was court-martialled, stripped of his command and sentenced to three years and two months Festungshaft (honorable imprisonment). Ehrler's sentence was later commuted and his loss of rank rescinded, and in February 1945 he was transferred to Jagdgeschwader 7 (JG 7–7th Fighter Wing). According to his fellow pilots, Ehrler thereafter flew in the increasingly desperate air battles without the purpose and dedication that had made him one of the Luftwaffe's most successful aces. On 4 April 1945, he claimed his last three victories by shooting down two Allied bombers and ramming and destroying a third with his damaged aircraft having run out of ammunition.

== Early life and career ==
Ehrler was born on 14 September 1917 in Oberbalbach, today part of Lauda-Königshofen, in the district of Tauberbischofsheim of the Grand Duchy of Baden. He was one of eight children of a laborer. When his mother died, his father married again. The second marriage added four more children to the family.

Following a vocational education as a butcher, Ehrler joined the military service of the Wehrmacht on 29 October 1935. He initially served with the 7th battery of Artillerie-Regiment 25 (25th artillery regiment) in Ludwigsburg, a regiment of the 25th Infantry Division. He then transferred to the Luftwaffe where he served with Flak-Regiment 8 (8th anti-aircraft artillery regiment) from 7 April to 1 November 1936.

From 2 November 1936 to 15 August 1937, Ehrler served with the 3./Flakabteilung 88 (3rd company of the 88th anti-aircraft department) of the Condor Legion in the Spanish Civil War. Following this assignment, he then served with the 14./Flak-Regiment 5 (14th company of the 5th anti-aircraft artillery regiment) from 24 August 1938 to 1 August 1939. He was then posted to 1./Reserve-Flakabteilung 502 (1st company of the 502nd reserve anti-aircraft battalion) on 2 August 1939.

== World War II ==
World War II in Europe began on Friday 1 September 1939 when German forces invaded Poland. Ehrler, who was still serving with the anti-aircraft artillery, requested transfer to the fighter force of the Luftwaffe on 3 January 1940. (Note: Flight training in the Luftwaffe progressed through the levels A1, A2 and B1, B2, referred to as A/B flight training. A training included theoretical and practical training in aerobatics, navigation, long-distance flights and dead-stick landings. The B courses included high-altitude flights, instrument flights, night landings and training to handle the aircraft in difficult situations.) His transfer request was accepted and he underwent flight training from 1 February to 4 November 1940. During this training period he was promoted to Feldwebel (staff sergeant) on 1 July and to Leutnant (second lieutenant) on 1 January 1941.

On 1 February 1941, Ehrler was posted to 4. Staffel (4th Squadron) of Jagdgeschwader 77 (JG 77–77th Fighter Wing) at Stavanger-Sola. (Note: For an explanation of Luftwaffe unit designations see Organisation of the Luftwaffe during World War II.) There, he scored his first victory in May 1941 and was awarded the Iron Cross 2nd Class (Eisernes Kreuz 2. Klasse) on 19 September 1941. In June, a newly formed 13. Staffel of JG 77 had been formed at Stavanger-Sola, initially also referred to as 4. Staffel. This Staffel was subordinated to I. Gruppe (1st group) of JG 77. In October, 13. Staffel was detached from I. Gruppe and sent to northern Norway where together with 14. Staffel of JG 77 they formed Jagdgruppe z.b.V. Petsamo which later became II. Gruppe of Jagdgeschwader 5 (JG 5–5th Fighter Wing). JG 77 supported X. Fliegerkorps (under Luftflotte 5) in operations against Britain from bases in Norway, often providing fighter cover for Junkers Ju 87 dive bomber attacks against British shipping. Elements of JG 77 was restructured as JG 5 Eismeer in January 1942.

=== War on the Arctic Front ===
Ehrler claimed his second victory on 19 February 1942. He led a patrol of three aircraft of 4. Staffel and shot down a Polikarpov I-18. On 30 April, 4. Staffel flew a combat air patrol along the Kirov Railway (Murman Railway). Near Loukhi, they encountered six Hawker Hurricane fighters from the 17 GvSAP (Gvardeyskiy Smeshannyy Aviatsionnyy Polk—Guards Composite Aviation Regiment). Three Hurricane fighters were shot down, including one by Ehrler. On 17 May, he claimed a Mikoyan-Gurevich MiG-3 fighter aircraft shot down. Ehrler was escorting Ju 87 dive bombers from I. Gruppe of Sturzkampfgeschwader 5 to the area of Kandalaksha. However, the aircraft shot down was a misidentified Hurricane fighter from 760 IAP (Fighter Aviation Regiment—Istrebitelny Aviatsionny Polk) piloted by Serzhant A. I. Bazarov. In late May, Ehrler was transferred to 6. Staffel of JG 5 which was based at Petsamo.

The Allied Convoy PQ 16, consisting of 35 merchant vessels headed from Hvalfjörður in Iceland to Murmansk from 21 to 30 May. At the same time, Convoy QP 12 with 15 freighters left Murmansk heading for Iceland. The convoys were sighted by German reconnaissance aircraft on 25 May 1942. Over the following five days, the convoys came under multiple attacks from Kampfgeschwader 30 (KG 30–30th Bomber Wing) and Kampfgeschwader 26 (KG 26–26th Bomber Wing). Ehrler claimed his first aerial victory with 6. Staffel on 28 May. On a fighter escort mission for Ju 87 dive bombers heading to Murmansk, he claimed the destruction of one of two Curtiss P-40 Warhawk fighters lost by 19 GvIAP (Guards Fighter Aviation Regiment—Gvardeyskiy Istrebitelny Aviatsionny Polk). On 30 May 1942, JG 5 engaged in combat again. In total, JG 5 claimed 43 fighter aircraft and 7 bombers shot down. Matching these claims against Soviet records, the figures appear to be inflated. That morning at 09:20, Ehrler, Feldwebel Rudolf Müller, Unteroffizier Hans Döbrich and another pilot each claimed a Hurricane fighter shot down. At the time and in the same area of this encounter, Podpolkovnik (lieutenant colonel) Boris Safonov, commander 2 GvSAP of the Soviet Naval Aviation, was shot down in his P-40 and killed in action. Between 12:35 and 14:00 on 2 June, Ehrler flew on mission providing fighter escort for Ju 87 attacking Murmansk. On this mission, the Germans encountered Hurricane and P-40 fighters. Ehrler claimed a P-40 destroyed. However, Soviet record only document the loss of two Hurricanes from 2 GvSAP.

=== Squadron leader ===
Ehrler was made Staffelkapitän (squadron leader) of the 6. Staffel of JG 5 after the former squadron leader Oberleutnant Hanns-Diether Hartwein was killed in action on 21 August 1942. Ehrler claimed his 45th and 46th aerial victory on 2 September. On 4 September, he was awarded the Knight's Cross of the Iron Cross (Ritterkreuz des Eisernen Kreuzes). The presentation was made by the Fliegerführer Nord Oberst Alexander Holle at Petsamo, later known as Pechenga. On 19 September, on a mission to Murmashi, Ehrler claimed two Hurricanes destroyed, taking his total number of aerial victories to 60.

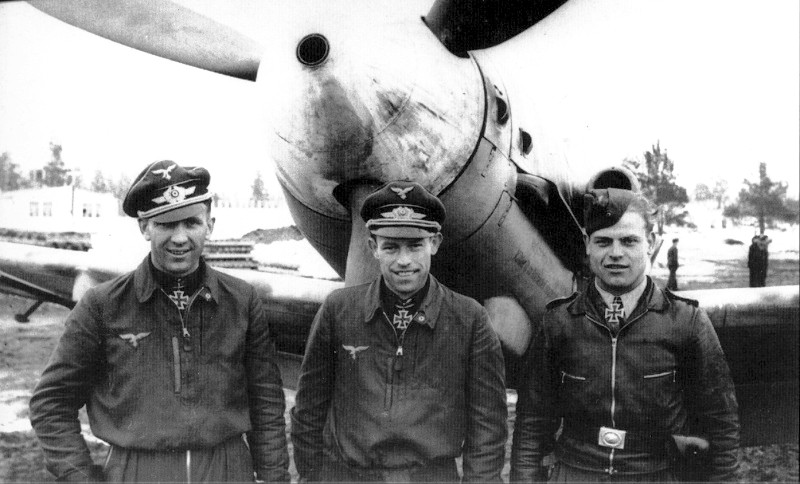
Theodor Weissenberger (left), Ehrler (center) and Rudolf Müller (right)

In combat near the Kirov Railway on 9 January 1943, Ehrler claimed two Lavochkin-Gorbunov-Gudkov LaGG-3s and a Hurricane shot down. He was promoted to Oberleutnant (first lieutenant) on 1 February 1943. In the afternoon of 27 March, II. Gruppe and III. Gruppe provided fighter escort for Messerschmitt Bf 110s and Focke-Wulf Fw 190s attacking the Soviet airfield at Murmashi. The flight encountered 30 Soviet fighters over Shonguy and Murmashi. In this engagement, the Germans claimed fourteen aerial victories, among them five by Ehrler. Soviet records document the loss of six aircraft. The next day, he was awarded the German Cross in Gold (Deutsches Kreuz in Gold).

On 1 May 1943, Ehrler was promoted to Hauptmann (captain). On 8 June 1943, Ehrler was credited with his 100th aerial victory. He was the 40th Luftwaffe pilot to achieve the century mark. On 1 August, Ehrler was awarded the Knight's Cross of the Iron Cross with Oak Leaves (Ritterkreuz des Eisernen Kreuzes mit Eichenlaub). The presentation was made by Adolf Hitler at the Wolf's Lair, Hitler's headquarters in Rastenburg. Six other Luftwaffe officers were presented with awards that day by Hitler, Hauptmann Egmont Prinz zur Lippe-Weißenfeld, Hauptmann Manfred Meurer, Oberleutnant Theodor Weissenberger, Oberleutnant Joachim Kirschner, and Hauptmann Werner Schröer were also awarded the Oak Leaves, and Major Helmut Lent received the Swords to his Knight's Cross with Oak Leaves.

Ehrler claimed aerial victories 113 to 115 on 18 August 1943. These were his first claims after the Oak Leaves presentation. Ehrler took off at 14:10 from Pontsalenjoki, heading north where he claimed two P-40s destroyed. During this mission, he lost his wingman Feldwebel Christian Stolz who was shot down by anti-aircraft artillery fire. Later that day, Ehrler shot down a Lavochkin La-5 northeast of Loukhi airfield.

=== Group and wing commander ===
On 1 September 1943, Ehrler was unofficially appointed Gruppenkommandeur (Group Commander) of III. Gruppe of JG 5. The position had to be backfilled following Major Günther Scholz's promotion to Geschwaderkommodore (Wing Commander) of JG 5 thus succeeding Oberstleutnant Gotthard Handrick. Ehrler's command of 6. Staffel was passed on to Oberleutnant Weissenberg. Ehrler then went on vacation for approximately one month. Following his return, Ehrler claimed his first aerial victory as Gruppenkommandeur and 116th in total over a P-40 on 24 September. On 25 November, following ten days of relative quiet, the Soviet Air Forces conducted a coordinated attack on Titovka, the Høybuktmoen airfield at Kirkenes, and the Luostari airfield near Pechenga. Titovka was attacked by sixteen Ilyushin Il-2s and six P-40s, escorted by six Yakovlev Yak-1s and four Yakovlev Yak-9s. Høybuktmoen was hit by twelve Petlyakov Pe-2s escorted by twelve Bell P-39 Airacobras and six Yak-9s. The Luostari airfield was struck by sixteen Il-2s and six P-40s, protected by fourteen Yak-1s and six Hurricanes. That day, Ehrler claimed two P-40s and two Il-2 ground attack aircraft, taking his total to 120 aerial victories.

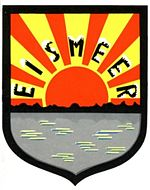
Emblem of JG 5 "Eismeer"

In 1944, III. Gruppe flew its first mission in force on 29 January. That day, all three Staffeln took off at 11:40 and encountered a number of Yakovlev Yak-7 fighters from 122 IAD PVO (Istrebitel'naya Aviatsionnaya Diviziya Protivo-Vozdushnoi Oborony—Fighter Aviation Division of the Home Air Defense) south of Murmashi. During this encounter, III. Gruppe pilots filed four claims including Ehrler's 121st aerial victory. However, Soviet records only account for the loss of one aircraft. On 13 March, a German convoy left Kirkenes while an inbound convoy was arriving. That day, III. Gruppe was continuously in the air, providing fighter protection for the ships. Ehrler increased his total number of aerial victories to 124 that day after he claimed a P-40 at 13:35 followed by a P-39 and an Il-2 shortly after.

Ehrler was credited with nine aerial victories in a 24 hours period on 25/26 May 1944, bringing his tally up to 155. Parts of III. Gruppe were ordered to relocate from Pechenga to Svartnes at 17:17 on 25 May. At 21:00, 19 Bf 109s under the leadership of Ehrler were scrambled from Svartnes to fend off approximately 80 Soviet aircraft attacking a German convoy. During this encounter III. Gruppe claimed 33 aerial victories, including twenty Douglas A-20 Havoc bombers, eight P-40s and five P-39s. However, Soviet records only account for five losses that day. Ehrler claimed four victories in this engagement which took his total to 150 aerial victories. The next day, Ehrler again led 19 Bf 109s from III. Gruppe in defense of the German convoy. This time the Germans reported combat with approximately 100 Soviet aircraft and claimed 40 aerial victories, among them five by Ehrler. Again, Soviet records do not match this figure, they document the loss of nine aircraft.

On 30 May 1944, Ehrler unintentionally made a crash landing in Messerschmitt Bf 109 G-6 (Werknummer 411963—factory number) at Pechenga airfield and sustained minor injuries in the accident. On 1 June 1944, 9. Staffel was officially detached from III. Gruppe and subordinated to II. Gruppe which had left Finland in April 1944 and fought in Reichsverteidigung (Defense of the Reich). Not every pilot of 9. Staffel was impacted by this order. Some pilots stayed in Pechenga and formed a newly created Kommandostaffel (commando squadron), later renamed to Eismeerstaffel (Arctic Sea squadron).

On 1 August, Ehrler was appointed Geschwaderkommodore of JG 5, replacing Oberstleutnant Scholz who was given the position of Jagdfliegerführer Norwegen. In consequence of this decision, Oberleutnant Franz Dörr was appointed Gruppenkommandeur of III. Gruppe and Leutnant Walter Schuck was given command of 7. Staffel, redesignated to 10. Staffel. On 9 November, Ehrler left his command post at Banak, heading to Bardufoss airfield to get firsthand information about organizational changes and training progress. There, he learned that many pilots were still unfamiliar with the Fw 190; not even the more senior pilots had flown the aircraft. Additionally, he learned that the new pilots lacked combat experience, nor had they been trained in formation flying. Subsequently, Ehrler ordered the 9. Staffel to train on the Fw 190 while he placed the junior pilots in the Kommandostaffel. To oversee these activities, he postponed his return to 12 November.

=== Sinking of the Tirpitz ===
On 12 November 1944 the Royal Air Force (RAF) launched Operation Catechism, the raid which sank the battleship Tirpitz. Avro Lancaster bombers from No. 617 and No. 9 squadrons were sent to Håkøya, a little west of Tromsø, where the Tirpitz was based. At the time, Ehrler was based at Bardufoss with 12 operational Fw 190 A-3s. Ehrler, who had gone to Bardufoss to assist with training a large influx of inexperienced pilots and helping veterans convert to the Fw 190, did not know the exact location of the battleship and had been told she was based near Tromsø. At no time was the commander informed his unit's sole responsibility was the protection of the ship.

The command and control center at Bardufoss was informed shortly before 08:00 that three Lancasters had been sighted at 07:39 in the vicinity of Mosjøen heading east. Shortly later, a second bulletin informed that a further Lancaster was sighted heading northeast. The reason for this delay in communication was that the message had been routed from Mosjøen to Fauske and then to the Luftwaffe headquarters at Narvik. The communication officer in charge, Leutnant Leo Beniers, immediately forwarded this information to Tromsø. At 08:18 the Luftwaffe fighter control center was informed which issued an air alarm for the area of Bodø. At 08:34 a further four Lancasters were reported but plotted in the wrong Planquadrat (PQ—grid reference) of the Luftwaffe grid map (Jägermeldenetz). Due to this error, neither Ehrler nor Dörr were informed of the approaching bombers.

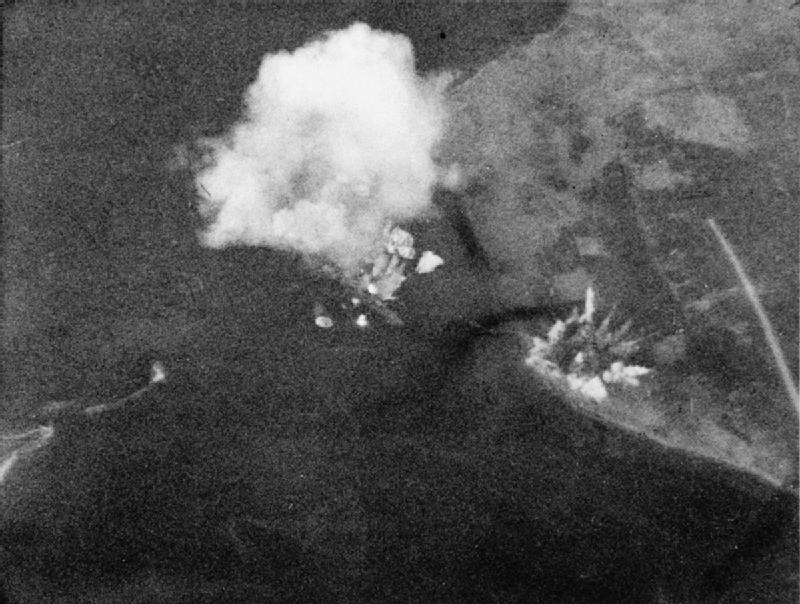
Tirpitz under attack.

That day, Ehrler had preemptively ordered 9. Staffel of JG 5 at Bardufoss airfield on three-minute readiness while the Kommandostaffel was still undergoing training and had been placed on 15-minute readiness. Ehrler, who had planned to fly to Alta, entered his command post at 08:50, unaware of the unfolding events. As he was just about to leave the command post, Tirpitz signaled that they heard aircraft engine noise of unknown origin and altitude, Tirpitz did not report approaching enemy bombers. At 09:18, Ehrler ordered cockpit readiness for 9. Staffel and placed the Kommandostaffel on three-minute readiness. The situation remained unclear for Ehrler until 09:21–09:23 when a second aircraft noise message arrived. He then at 09:23 sounded the alarm and scrambled 9. Staffel. In parallel, Dörr who was alarmed by the fighters taking off, arrived at the command post and took charge of the Kommandostaffel. Ehrler was airborne at 09:25 while takeoff of 9. Staffel was delayed by five minutes due to a landing Junkers Ju 52. Adding to the confusion, when the British aircraft were detected by the German air defence staff at Tromsø, they asked the airfield command if any fighter aircraft were ready for takeoff. The JG 5 staff replied affirmatively, but they thought the enquiry concerned the flight to Alta. The naval officers on board Tirpitz were notified Erhler was airborne before the British began their attack at 09:38.

Ehrler was already airborne when he realized that his radio transmitter was not working. Unable to communicate with his command center nor with the other pilots, he was unsure in what direction to fly. He decided to continue flying to Alta. At 09:30, Oberleutnant Werner Gayko, the commander of 9. Staffel, finally took off, followed by the other aircraft. At 09:42, Ehrler reached the vicinity of Storsteinnes when he observed to his left a distant mushroom-shaped cloud and anti-artillery bursts. He then decided to head towards the smoke before heading west, hoping to cut off the bombers. He searched the coast heading northeast and southwest, and then to Malnes and to the vicinity of Heia before finally flying to Alta. When it finally became clear that the target was the Tirpitz, it was too late for the fighters to intercept, and the Tirpitz was destroyed with much loss of life. 9. Staffel also did not find the bombers and returned to Bardufoss airfield.

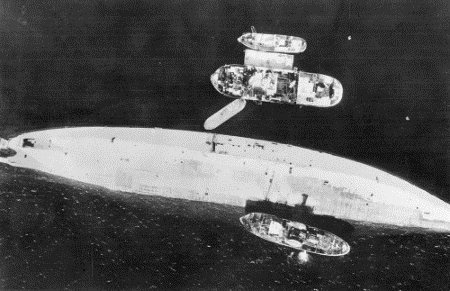
Tirpitz capsized after Operation Catechism.

After this unsuccessful action, Ehrler and Dörr faced a court martial hearing in Oslo on the grounds of not having understood the seriousness of the attack. The allegations included delaying scrambling the fighters, leaving the squadron and falsely claiming that Ehrler's radio had ceased to operate, preventing him from leading the squadron against the enemy aircraft. Ehrler and Dörr were both made responsible for the loss and tried before the 2nd senate of the Reichskriegsgericht on 17, 18 and 20 December 1944 under the chair of Generalrichter Dr. Ernst Reuter. Both were charged with cowardice before the enemy, a charge which had to be dropped. Ehrler was also charged for having abnormal ambition. The court believed that Ehrler abandoned his command post to claim his 200th aerial victory thus disobeying a direct order from the Reichsmarschall which demanded that such a mission should have been led from the ground. While Dörr was acquitted of all charges, Ehrler was found guilty, relieved of command, demoted and sentenced to three years imprisonment for insubordination. In addition, the court concluded that Ehrler lacked the necessary experience to lead a fighter unit on the Western Front. Ehrler had been recommended for the Knight's Cross of the Iron Cross with Oak Leaves and Swords (Ritterkreuz des Eisernen Kreuzes mit Eichenlaub und Schwertern) prior to the loss of Tirpitz, but the award was not approved.

The sentence may have been politically motivated. Karl Dönitz was now in the ascendant over Göring, who ultimately court-martialled Ehrler, perhaps to placate the commander-in-chief of the navy. Ehrler's combat record likely saved him from execution. Ehrler was not helped by persistent rumours that he was on unofficial leave with a girlfriend in Oslo as nearly a thousand sailors died.

Schuck, one of his junior officers, appealed to Reichskommissar Josef Terboven. On 12 January 1945 Terboven hand-delivered Schuck's affidavit in support of Ehrler to Reichsmarschall Hermann Göring, Commander-in-Chief of the Luftwaffe. Further investigations and testimonies indicated that the aircrews did not know that the Tirpitz had been moved to the new location at Håkøya a couple of weeks earlier, and Heinrich Ehrler was a convenient scapegoat for the failure to protect Tirpitz. The investigation concluded the reason for the failure was poor communication between the Kriegsmarine and the Luftwaffe. Ehrler was exonerated. On 1 March 1945, Hitler officially pardoned Ehrler, the Führer HQ announced his return to front-line service, where he would have the chance to "rehabilitate himself." Ehrler's sentence was commuted and his loss of rank rescinded. He was reassigned to a Messerschmitt Me 262 fighter squadron in Germany.

=== Defense of the Reich and death ===
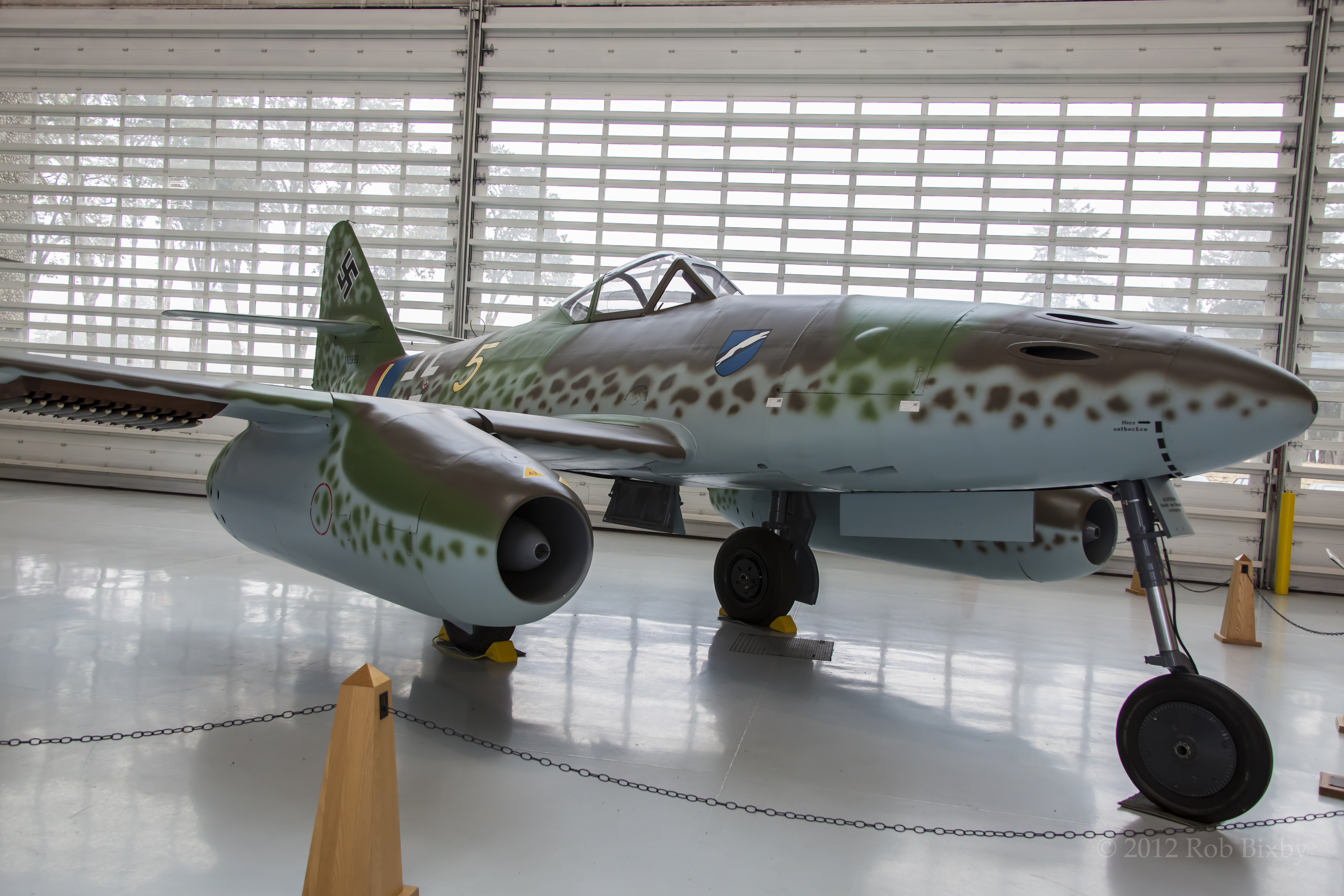
A Me 262 of JG 7 similar to the aircraft flown by Ehrler on display at the Evergreen Aviation & Space Museum.

Ehrler was transferred to Jagdgeschwader 7 (JG 7–7th Fighter Wing) on 27 February 1945 under the command of Major Weissenberger, his former comrade from JG 5. JG 7 was equipped with the Me 262 jet fighter, and was given the task of Reichsverteidigung. During the next five weeks, Ehrler claimed further eight aerial victories while flying with the Geschwaderstab (headquarters unit) of JG 7. (Note: For a list of Luftwaffe Jet aces see List of German World War II jet aces) On 21 March 1945, the United States Army Air Forces (USAAF) Eighth Air Force attacked various Luftwaffe airfields in Germany with approximately 1,300 heavy bombers, escorted by 750 fighter aircraft. That day, Ehrler for the first time flew the Me 262 operationally and claimed the destruction of a Boeing B-17 Flying Fortress bomber. The next day, the Eighth Air Force again targeted various military installations and airfields in Germany. Flying from Parchim airfield, Ehrler claimed another B-17 bomber shot down. On 23 March, the Fifteenth Air Force headed for Ruhland where the Schwarzheide synthetic fuel factory (Synthesewerk Schwarzheide or Hydrierwerk Brabag) was based. The bombers came under attack by 14 Me 262s from JG 7 over Chemnitz. In this encounter, Ehrler shot down two B-24 Liberator bombers. The next day, he claimed his fifth aerial victory while flying the Me 262, making him a jet ace. That day, 1,714 bombers, escorted by approximately 1,300 fighter aircraft, targeted 18 Luftwaffe airfields. In the vicinity of Dessau, Ehrler attacked bombers from the 463rd Bombardment Group and 483d Bombardment Group and shot down a B-17. On 31 March, the USAAF Eighth Air Force targeted the oil refineries at Zeitz and Bad Berka, as well as other targets of opportunity. In parallel, the RAF Bomber Command bombed the Blohm & Voss shipyards in Hamburg. In the afternoon, Ehrler claimed a North American P-51 Mustang fighter, escorting B-17s and B-24s to their target areas.

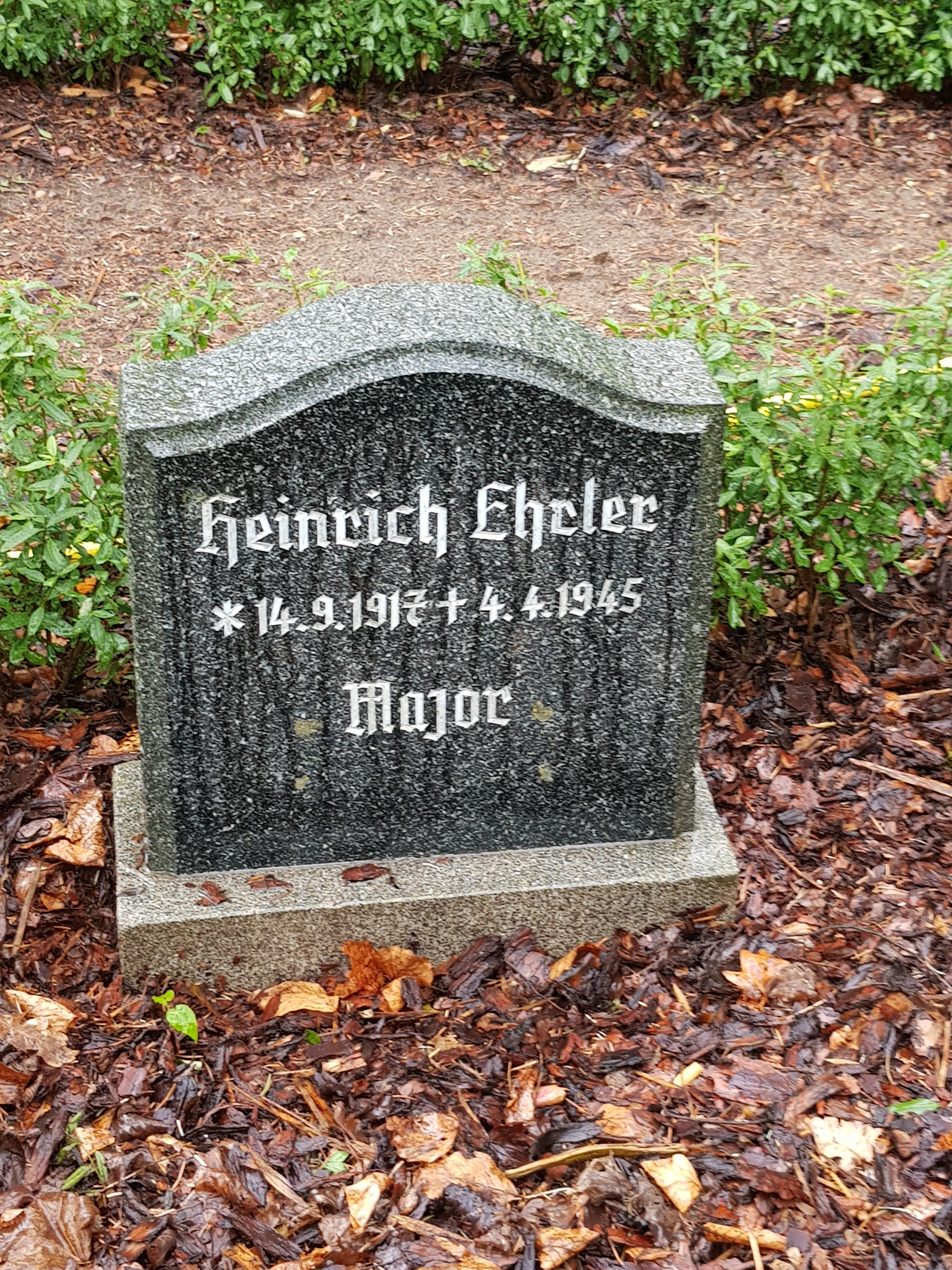
Grave in Stendal.

Various authors present conflicting information regarding Ehrler's last aerial victories, as well as date and cause of death. Depending on source, his last combat and death occurred on either 4 or 6 April 1945. In one account presented by Forsyth, Ehrler was shot down by a P-51 northeast of Scharlibbe. According to both Boehme and Forsyth, the Luftwaffe combat report signed by Weissenberger and Schuck, a former JG 5 pilot, dates his death on 6 April. In addition, Boehme points out that the report does not reveal the cause of death. On 7 April, a body was recovered near Stendal. An autopsy indicated that it was Ehrler who was then buried at Stendal on 10 April. Forsyth states that the USAAF reported no combat with Me 262s on 6 April. Subsequently, Forsyth speculates that this combat may have taken place on 4 April and that the report is incorrectly labeled. The authors Morgan and Weal concur with the events presented by Boehme, while Heaton, Mathews and Foreman are more in line with Forsyth, stating Ehrler was killed in action on 4 April 1945.

On 4 April, RAF Bomber Command targeted Nordhausen with 243 Lancaster bombers while the USAAF Eighth Air Force sent 950 B-17s and B-24s to Luftwaffe airfields at Kaltenkirchen, Parchim, Perleberg, Wesendorf, Faßberg, Hoya, Dedelstorf and Eggebek, as well as the U-boat yards at Finkenwerder and shipyards at Kiel. This bomber force was protected by 800 escort fighters. In the Forsyth account, Ehrler claimed his final two aerial victories on this date. On 6 April, the Eighth Air Force attacked Halle, Leipzig and Gera with a force of 641 heavy bombers, escorted by 600 P-51s and Republic P-47 Thunderbolt fighters. According to Boehme, Ehrler claimed two B-17s shot down from this attack force before being killed. Alternatively, both authors report that Ehrler may have died while ramming an enemy bomber. According to Ehrler's final received transmission, he radioed "Theo, I've just used all my ammunition. I'm going to ram. Good bye. See you in Valhalla." Schuck who followed the radio transmission exchange over the loudspeaker in the operations room recalls Ehrler's last words slightly differently. He believes they were: "Theo, Heinrich here. Have just shot down two bombers. No more ammunition. I'm going to ram. Auf Wiedersehen, see you in Valhalla!"

On 11 December 2018, the Neue Zürcher Zeitung, a Swiss, German-language daily newspaper, published an article by the missing in action researcher Uwe Benkel. According to this article, Benkel, aided by relatives, found remnants of Ehrler's Me 262 and body. A recovery of the remains is planned, an event desperately awaited by Ehrler's brother.

== Summary of career ==
=== Aerial victory claims ===
According to US historian David T. Zabecki, Ehrler was credited with 208 aerial victories. While Spick lists Ehrler with 209 aerial victories claimed in an unknown number of combat missions. Of these, ten were claimed over the Western Allies and the remaining 199 on the Eastern Front. Obermaier lists him with 208 aerial victories claimed in over 400 combat missions. Mathews and Foreman, authors of Luftwaffe Aces – Biographies and Victory Claims, researched the German Federal Archives and state that Ehrler was credited with more than 182 aerial victories. This figure includes at least 173 claims made on the Eastern Front and 9 on the Western Front, including seven four-engined bombers and eight victories with the Me 262 jet fighter. However, the authors indicate that the records for JG 5 are incomplete. They speculate that the actual number of confirmed victories could also be as low as 150 to 175.

=== Awards ===
- Front Flying Clasp of the Luftwaffe in Gold
- Iron Cross (1939)
  - 2nd Class (19 September 1941)
  - 1st Class (21 January 1942)
- Honour Goblet of the Luftwaffe on 20 July 1942 as Leutnant and pilot
- German Cross in Gold on 18 March 1943 as Leutnant in the 6./Jagdgeschwader 5
- Knight's Cross of the Iron Cross with Oak Leaves
  - Knight's Cross on 4 September 1942 as Leutnant and pilot in the 6./Jagdgeschwader 5
  - 265th Oak Leaves on 2 August 1943 as Hauptmann and Gruppenkommandeur of the III./Jagdgeschwader 5

== Notes ==
Military offices
Preceded by Oberstleutnant Günther Scholz	Commander of Jagdgeschwader 5 Eismeer; 1 August 1944 – 27 February 1945	Succeeded by Oberstleutnant Günther Scholz
