= Albin Döbrich =

Austrian sculptor (1872–1945)

- Born: 7 January 1872; Sonneberg, Saxe-Meiningen, German Empire
- Died: 19 November 1945 (aged 73); Vienna, Austria
- Occupation: Sculptor
- Relatives: Hans Döbrich (son)

Albin Döbrich (7 January 1872 – 19 November 1945) was an Austrian sculptor. His work was part of the sculpture event in the art competition at the 1948 Summer Olympics.
