= Alfred Lammer =

Alfred Lammer DFC and Bar
- Born: Alfred Ritter von Lammer; 28 November 1909; Linz, Austria
- Died: 4 October 2000 (aged 90); Southwark, London
- Military career
- Allegiance: United Kingdom
- Branch: Royal Air Force
- Service years: 1940–1945
- Rank: Squadron Leader
- Service number: 81940
- Conflicts: World War II: Battle of Britain; North African Campaign
- Awards: DFC and Bar
- Other work: Photographer

Squadron Leader Alfred Lammer DFC and Bar (28 November 1909 – 4 October 2000) was an Austrian-born airman who flew with the Royal Air Force in World War II. He flew with RAF Fighter Command between 10 July and 31 October 1940, thereby qualifying for the Battle of Britain clasp to the 1939–45 campaign star. On the official Royal Air Force list of Battle of Britain combatants he is recorded as being stateless.

In later life he became a renowned photographer and teacher.

== Early life ==
Born Alfred Ritter von Lammer in Linz, Austria, he was the son of a retired railway official and mother who ran both a travel shop and a bank. Living near the Zell am See, Salzburg he became adept at rock climbing and skiing.

He attended universities in Munich and Innsbruck, and in 1933 joined the anti-Nazi Heimatschutz and Schutzcorps. Leaving Austria for London in 1934, he worked (using his mother's contacts) for the Austrian Travel Bureau.

When Nazi Germany imposed high taxes on tourists entering Germany from Austria, his mother's firm collapsed. He took up photography, an interest that became a career later in his life.

== Second World War ==
With the declaration of war in September 1939, Lammer found himself to be stateless and classified as a "friendly enemy alien". He did not become a British citizen until 22 May 1941.

He applied to join the RAF, and passing the medical was granted an emergency commission in March 1940, for training as an Air Gunner. After initial training in Loughborough, Lammer went on a gunnery course at 9 BGS, Penrhos in April 1940. He joined No. 254 Squadron at Bircham Newton on 4 May and was then attached to 206 Squadron (Coastal Command), flying in Hudsons on convoy escort duty. In early July 1940 Lammer was posted to 5 OTU, Aston Down, and converted to Defiants before joining 141 Squadron at Prestwick.

Lammer retrained as a Navigator and was posted to No. 409 (RCAF) Squadron on Beaufighters at Coleby Grange in November 1941. He went to No. 255 Squadron at Coltishall in February 1942 as Senior Navigator. The squadron flew to Gibraltar on 14 November and to Algiers the next day. Lammer assisted in the destruction of a He 111 and two Cant Z 1007's on 6 December, flying with S/L JH Player. On 15 and 17 December two Ju 88's were destroyed, flying with W/C DPDG Kelly. Lammer was awarded the DFC on 16 February 1943.

With his tour completed, Lammer returned to the UK and was posted as Squadron Leader i/c Radar and Navigation at 62 OTU, Ouston in September 1943. He was awarded a Bar to the DFC on 29 October 1943. He spent the rest of the war as a radio navigator instructor at RAF Charter Hall.

== Postwar career ==
After being demobilised from the RAF Lammer again turned to photography and joined Studio Briggs before going freelance in 1946. He also took up teaching posts at Guildford School of Art (now University for the Creative Arts) and the Central School of Arts and Crafts in London.

In the late 1950s he was the staff photographer at the Council of Industrial Design and continued to teach at Guildford School of Art. He retired in 1976 but continued to take photographs, especially of flowers in their natural environment and of stained glass, including a notable contribution to the popular books by stained glass artist John Baker.

== Honours and awards ==
- 16 February 1943 – The award of DFC to Flight Lieutenant Alfred Lammer (81940), Royal Air Force Volunteer Reserve, No. 255 Squadron.

As observer, Flight Lieutenant Lammer has rendered valuable service having participated in the destruction of 4 enemy aircraft. He has set an excellent example.

— London Gazette

- 29 October 1943 – The award of Bar to DFC to Flight Lieutenant Alfred Lammer DFC (81940), Royal Air Force Volunteer Reserve, No. 255 Squadron.

== See also ==
- List of World War II aces from Austria
- List of RAF aircrew in the Battle of Britain
- Non-British personnel in the RAF during the Battle of Britain
