= Alfred Wehmeyer =

- Born: 21 May 1919; Vienna, Austria
- Died: 1 June 1942 (aged 23); Tobruk, Libya
- Military career
- Allegiance: Nazi Germany
- Branch: Heer (1938–39); Luftwaffe (1939–42)
- Service years: 1938–42
- Rank: Oberleutnant (first lieutenant)
- Units: Gebirgsjäger-Regiment 100; ZG 26
- Conflicts: World War II: Annexation of Austria; Battle of France; Battle of Britain; Invasion of Yugoslavia; Battle of Greece; Battle of Crete; Operation Crusader; Battle of Gazala
- Awards: Knight's Cross of the Iron Cross

Alfred Wehmeyer (21 May 1919 – 1 June 1942) was a German Luftwaffe ace and recipient of the Knight's Cross of the Iron Cross during World War II. The Knight's Cross of the Iron Cross, and its variants were the highest awards in the military and paramilitary forces of Nazi Germany during World War II. Wehmeyer was credited with 18 aerial victories, all against Western forces. His Messerschmitt Bf 110 was shotdown by British antiaircraft fire near Tobruk, Libya on 1 June 1942. He was posthumously awarded the Knight's Cross of the Iron Cross on 4 September 1942.

== Awards ==
- Anschluss Medal (8 November 1938)
- Flugzeugführerabzeichen (1 February 1940)
- Front Flying Clasp of the Luftwaffe in Gold (18 December 1941)
- Ehrenpokal der Luftwaffe (21 March 1941)
- Iron Cross (1939)
  - 2nd Class (26 August 1940)
  - 1st Class (30 September 1940)
- Wound Badge (1939)
  - in Black (23 February 1941)
- German Cross in Gold (25 February 1942)
- Knight's Cross of the Iron Cross on 4 September 1942 as Oberleutnant and Staffelkapitän of the 7./Zerstörergeschwader 26 "Horst Wessel"
- Silver Medal of Military Valor (5 November 1941)
- Ärmelband Afrika
