= List of aerial victories claimed by Walter Nowotny =

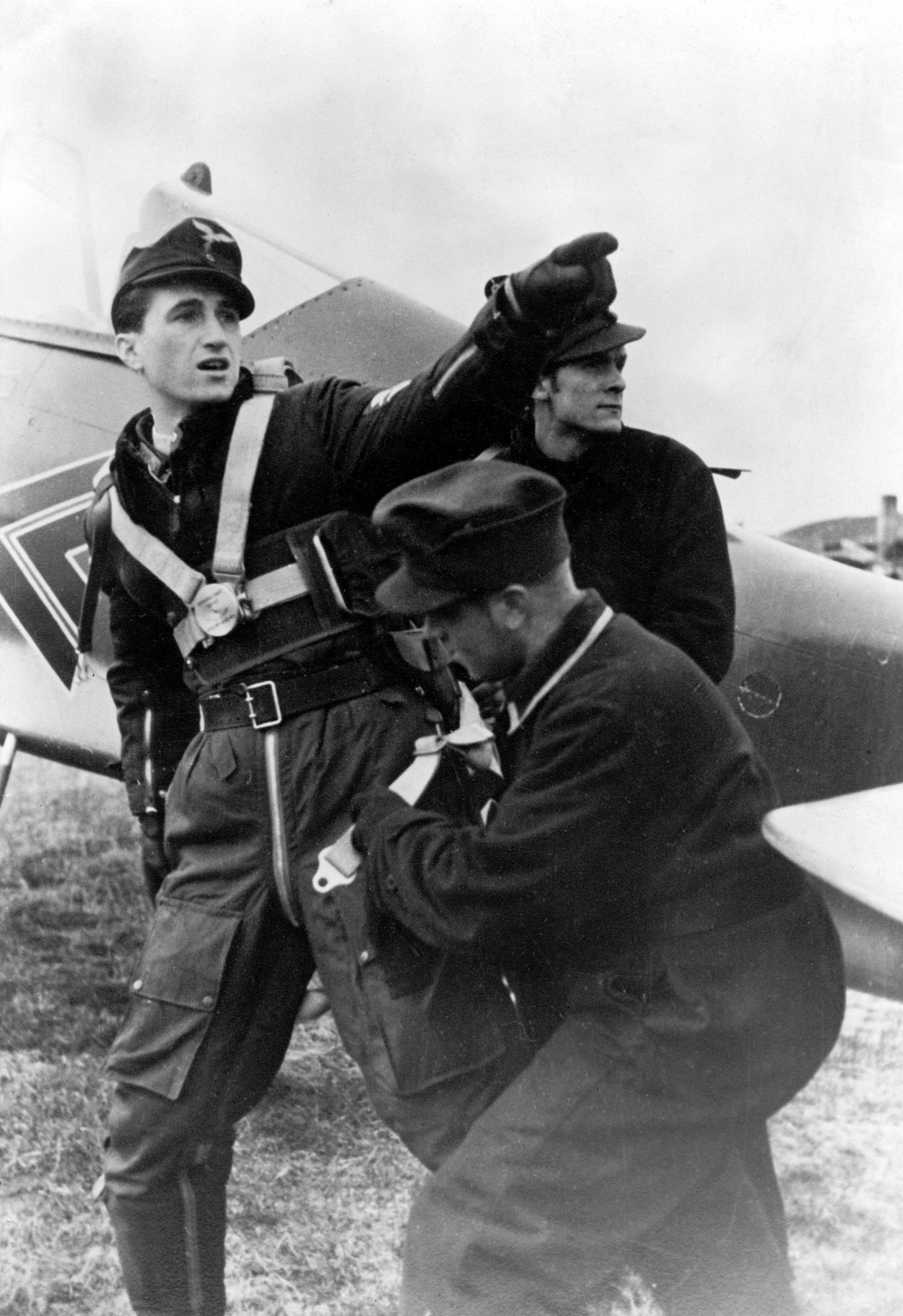
Nowotny prepares for flight

Walter Nowotny (7 December 1920 – 8 November 1944) was an Austrian-born fighter ace of the Luftwaffe in World War II. He is credited with 258 aerial victories—that is, 258 aerial combat encounters resulting in the destruction of the enemy aircraft—in 442 combat missions. Nowotny achieved 255 of these victories on the Eastern Front and three while flying one of the first jet fighters, the Messerschmitt Me 262, in the Defense of the Reich. He scored most of his victories in the Focke-Wulf Fw 190, and approximately 50 in the Messerschmitt Bf 109.

== List of aerial victories claimed ==
According to Spick, Nowotny is credited with 258 aerial victories claimed in 442 combat missions. Nowotny achieved 255 of these victories on the Eastern Front and three while flying one of the first jet fighters, the Messerschmitt Me 262, in the Defense of the Reich. Mathews and Foreman, authors of Luftwaffe Aces — Biographies and Victory Claims, researched the German Federal Archives and found records for 256 aerial victory claims, plus four further unconfirmed claims. This figure of confirmed claims includes 255 aerial victories on the Eastern Front and one victory on the Western Front flying the Me 262 jet fighter.

Victory claims were logged to a map-reference (PQ = Planquadrat), for example "PQ 35 Ost 19672". The Luftwaffe grid map (Jägermeldenetz) covered all of Europe, western Russia and North Africa and was composed of rectangles measuring 15 minutes of latitude by 30 minutes of longitude, an area of about 360 square miles (930 km^{2}). These sectors were then subdivided into 36 smaller units to give a location area 3 km × 4 km (1.9 mi × 2.5 mi) in size.

♠ (Ace of spades) indicates those aerial victories which made Nowotny an "ace-in-a-day", a term which designates a fighter pilot who has shot down five or more airplanes in a single day.
– (dash) indicates unconfirmed aerial victory claims for which Nowotny did not receive credit.
? (question mark) indicates information discrepancies listed by Prien, Stemmer, Rodeike, Bock, Mathews and Foreman.

Claim	Date	Time	Type	Location	Claim	Date	Time	Type	Location
– 1. Staffel of Ergänzungsgruppe/Jagdgeschwader 54 –
1	19 July 1941	19:24	I-15	7 km (4.3 mi) northwest of Arensburg	7	17 August 1941	13:28	DB-3	PQ 35 Ost 19672; Lake Ilmen
2	19 July 1941	19:25	I-15	7 km (4.3 mi) northwest of Arensburg	8	17 August 1941	13:30	DB-3	PQ 35 Ost 19681; 40 km (25 mi) southeast of Novgorod
—	19 July 1941	—	I-15	7 km (4.3 mi) northwest of Arensburg	9	19 August 1941	14:00	I-153	PQ 35 Ost 28244; 25 km (16 mi) west of Valday
3	31 July 1941	14:15	DB-3	PQ 35 Ost 28143; 10 km (6.2 mi) west of Malaya Vishera	10	19 August 1941	14:04	I-153	PQ 35 Ost 28251; 30 km (19 mi) northeast of Demyansk
4	8 August 1941	17:10	MBR-2	PQ 35 Ost 2974	11	8 January 1942	09:00	I-16	Morje south of Morja
5	8 August 1941	17:15	MBR-2	PQ 25 Ost 2974	12	8 January 1942	09:11	I-16	Morje northwest of Morja
6	9 August 1941	17:45	DB-3	PQ 25 Ost 19692; 45 km (28 mi) southeast of Novgorod					
– 3. Staffel of Jagdgeschwader 54 –
13	25 April 1942	14:40	MiG-3		36♠	20 July 1942	19:12	P-40	
14	26 April 1942	17:14	Pe-2		37	21 July 1942	19:05	MiG-3	
15	30 April 1942	19:20	I-16		38	23 July 1942	07:30	P-40	
16	11 May 1942	17:15	P-40		39	23 July 1942	07:40	P-40	
17	13 May 1942	09:41	I-180 (Yak-7)	PQ 11743; Lake Ladoga	40	23 July 1942	07:52	MiG-3	
18	16 May 1942	10:40	I-16	PQ 1025	41	25 July 1942	17:15	MiG-3	PQ 00273; 15 km (9.3 mi) northeast of Pushkin
19	16 May 1942	10:43	P-40	PQ 1025	42	25 July 1942	19:30	I-180 (Yak-7)	PQ 00153; 10 km (6.2 mi) south of Leningrad
20	28 May 1942	19:51	I-16		43	26 July 1942	17:05	MiG-3	PQ 20511; 45 km (28 mi) east-northeast of Lyuban
21	6 June 1942	14:50	MiG-3		44	26 July 1942	17:20	P-40	PQ 20542; 45 km (28 mi) east of Lyuban
22	7 June 1942	13:30	I-180 (Yak-7)		45	26 July 1942	17:25	Il-2	PQ 20511; 45 km (28 mi) east-northeast of Lyuban
23	9 June 1942	15:35	MiG-3		46	28 July 1942	09:30	LaGG-3	Leningrad
24	9 June 1942	15:39	MiG-3		47	28 July 1942	15:30	MiG-3	southwest of Kolpino
25	11 June 1942	20:45	Yak-1		48♠	2 August 1942	12:55	I-16	PQ 00163; 10 km (6.2 mi) southeast of Leningrad
26	25 June 1942	17:35	LaGG-3		49♠	2 August 1942	13:05	I-16	PQ 00191; 10 km (6.2 mi) north of Pushkin
27	26 June 1942	14:10	LaGG-3		50♠	2 August 1942	13:24	MiG-3	PQ 00153; 10 km (6.2 mi) south of Leningrad
28	26 June 1942	14:20	LaGG-3		51♠	2 August 1942	14:20	I-16	PQ 00123 vicinity of Leningrad
29	26 June 1942	16:16	LaGG-3		52♠	2 August 1942	14:25	LaGG-3	PQ 00161; 10 km (6.2 mi) southeast of Leningrad
30	11 July 1942	13:05	P-40		53♠	2 August 1942	14:40	MiG-3	PQ 00154; 10 km (6.2 mi) south of Leningrad
31	11 July 1942	13:12	Il-2		54♠	2 August 1942	14:55	MiG-3	PQ 00192; 10 km (6.2 mi) north of Pushkin
32♠	20 July 1942	12:35	LaGG-3		55	7 August 1942	09:25	Il-2	PQ 20552; 45 km (28 mi) northeast of Chudovo
33♠	20 July 1942	12:42	LaGG-3		56	7 August 1942	09:30	LaGG-3	PQ 20563; 55 km (34 mi) northeast of Chudovo
34♠	20 July 1942	18:52	P-40		57	11 August 1942	11:15	MiG-3	PQ 18231; 30 km (19 mi) east-southeast of Staraya Russa
35♠	20 July 1942	19:06	I-180 (Yak-7)						
– 1. Staffel of Jagdgeschwader 54 –
58	8 November 1942	09:45	I-15? (Note: According to Mathews and Foreman claimed as a Curtiss P-40 Warhawk.)	PQ 11844; 35 km (22 mi) northeast of Schlüsselburg	137♠	13 August 1943	19:00	LaGG-3	PQ 35 Ost 61344, Borisovka; 30 km (19 mi) west of Belgorod
59	8 November 1942	11:33	MiG-3	PQ 11792; Lake Ladoga	138	14 August 1943	12:20	La-5	PQ 35 Ost 51881, Krysino; 20 km (12 mi) southeast of Bohodukhiv
60	10 December 1942	09:16	P-40	PQ 10152 southeast of Schlüsselburg	139	14 August 1943	12:23	La-5	PQ 35 Ost 51853, Dolina; 15 km (9.3 mi) east of Bohodukhiv
61	10 December 1942	11:55	LaGG-3	PQ 11743; Lake Ladoga	140	14 August 1943	12:27	Yak-7	PQ 35 Ost 51673, Petroparlowka; 15 km (9.3 mi) north of Bohodukhiv
62	7 January 1943	09:40	I-16	PQ 1961	141	15 August 1943	11:00	La-5	PQ 35 Ost 51762, Bohodukhiv; 10 km (6.2 mi) west of Bohodukhiv
63	2 March 1943	11:28? (Note: According to Mathews and Foreman claimed at 11:29.)	I-16	PQ 90271; 20 km (12 mi) south of Lomonosov	142	15 August 1943	11:10	La-5	PQ 35 Ost 51734, Bohodukhiv; 10 km (6.2 mi) northwest of Bohodukhiv
64	7 March 1943	13:40	Il-2	PQ 18364; 40 km (25 mi) south of Staraya Russa	143	15 August 1943	11:12	La-5	PQ 35 Ost 51733, Gutorowka; 10 km (6.2 mi) northwest of Bohodukhiv
65	7 March 1943	16:20	LaGG-3	PQ 28371; 25 km (16 mi) southwest of Demyansk	144	16 August 1943	11:16	La-5	PQ 35 Ost 51732, Gorbanowka; 10 km (6.2 mi) northwest of Bohodukhiv
66	9 March 1943	10:20	MiG-1? (Note: According to Mathews and Foreman claimed as a Mikoyan-Gurevich MiG-3.)	PQ 00211; 20 km (12 mi) east of Leningrad	145	16 August 1943	11:21	La-5	PQ 35 Ost 51652, Iweschkij; 10 km (6.2 mi) east of Utrikowo
67	9 March 1943	10:21	MiG-1	PQ 00211; 20 km (12 mi) east of Leningrad	146♠	18 August 1943	07:35	La-5	PQ 35 Ost 60134; Gulf of Finland, north of Kunda? (Note: Location based on Mathews and Foreman, not matching area of operation.)
68	14 March 1943	14:50	LaGG-3	PQ 35 Ost 18272; 25 km (16 mi) southeast of Staraya Russa	147♠	18 August 1943	07:39	Il-2	PQ 35 Ost 6013
69	14 March 1943	14:53	LaGG-3	PQ 35 Ost 18281; 30 km (19 mi) southeast of Staraya Russa	148♠	18 August 1943	07:43	LaGG-3	PQ 35 Ost 60161; Gulf of Finland, north of Kunda?
70	15 March 1943	07:55? (Note: According to Mathews and Foreman claimed at 07:56.)	LaGG-3	PQ 35 Ost 18244; 25 km (16 mi) southeast of Staraya Russa	149♠	18 August 1943	07:44	LaGG-3	PQ 35 Ost 60152; Gulf of Finland, north of Kunda?
71	15 March 1943	08:04	LaGG-3	PQ 35 Ost 18263; 30 km (19 mi) east-southeast of Staraya Russa	150♠	18 August 1943	16:20	MiG-3	PQ 35 Ost 51862, Kantoschirow; 25 km (16 mi) east of Bohodukhiv
72	15 March 1943	15:10	LaGG-3	PQ 35 Ost 18253; 25 km (16 mi) southeast of Staraya Russa	151♠	18 August 1943	16:23	Il-2	PQ 35 Ost 51893, Olshany; 25 km (16 mi) northwest of Kharkov
73	19 March 1943	09:45	La-5	PQ 36 Ost 1018	152	19 August 1943	15:30	P-39	PQ 35 Ost 51712, Saboroschez; 15 km (9.3 mi) southeast of Achtyrka
74	19 March 1943	09:55	La-5	PQ 36 Ost 10184; 15 km (9.3 mi) north-northeast of Staraya Russa	153	19 August 1943	15:31	P-39	PQ 35 Ost 51712, Saboroschez; 15 km (9.3 mi) southeast of Achtyrka
75	20 March 1943	12:15? (Note: According to Mathews and Foreman claimed at 12:18.)	LaGG-3	PQ 36 Ost 0048	154	19 August 1943	15:37	P-39	PQ 35 Ost 51732, Gorbanowka; 10 km (6.2 mi) northwest of Bohodukhiv
76	22 March 1943	11:30? (Note: According to Mathews and Foreman claimed at 11:50.)	LaGG-3	PQ 36 Ost 0041	155♠	21 August 1943	06:55	La-5 (Note: According to Mathews and Foreman claimed as a Lavochkin-Gorbunov-Gudkov LaGG-3.)	PQ 35 Ost 51671, Iwanj-Bardini; 15 km (9.3 mi) north of Bohodukhiv
77	22 March 1943	12:00	Il-2	PQ 36 Ost 00414; 10 km (6.2 mi) east of Pushkin	156♠	21 August 1943	06:56	La-5	PQ 35 Ost 51671, Iwanj-Bardini; 15 km (9.3 mi) north of Bohodukhiv
78	22 March 1943	12:05	Il-2	PQ 36 Ost 00412; 10 km (6.2 mi) east of Pushkin	157♠	21 August 1943	07:00	La-5	PQ 35 Ost 51643 south of Grayvoron
79	26 March 1943	10:25	Spitfire	PQ 36 Ost 10332; 10 km (6.2 mi) southeast of Mga	158♠	21 August 1943	07:03	La-5	PQ 35 Ost 51642 south of Grayvoron
80	3 April 1943	10:31	LaGG-3? (Note: According to Mathews and Foreman claimed as a Lavochkin La-5.)	PQ 36 Ost 0041	159♠	21 August 1943	16:02	Il-2	PQ 35 Ost 51533, Staraja Rabinja northeast of Bohodukhiv
81	3 April 1943	18:11	MiG-3	PQ 36 Ost 00271; 15 km (9.3 mi) northeast of Pushkin	160♠	21 August 1943	16:03	LaGG-3	PQ 35 Ost 51551, Popowka northeast of Bohodukhiv
82	6 May 1943	16:15	LaGG-3	PQ 26 Ost 90214 vicinity of Lomonosov	161♠	21 August 1943	16:08	LaGG-3	PQ 35 Ost 51533, Staraja Rabinja northeast of Bohodukhiv
83	27 May 1943	19:05	LaGG-3	PQ 36 Ost 00243; 20 km (12 mi) southeast of Leningrad	162	23 August 1943	10:45	LaGG-3	PQ 35 Ost 60111; Gulf of Finland, north of Kunda
84♠	1 June 1943	04:55	La-5	PQ 36 Ost 20154 southwest of Volkhov	163	23 August 1943	10:48	LaGG-3	PQ 35 Ost 60773; 15 km (9.3 mi) northwest of Kharkov
85♠	1 June 1943	05:20	LaGG-3	PQ 36 Ost 1026	164	24 August 1943	07:27	LaGG-3	PQ 35 Ost 41483
86♠	1 June 1943	16:00	LaGG-3	PQ 36 Ost 20154 southwest of Volkhov	165	24 August 1943	07:32	La-5	PQ 35 Ost 41461
87♠	1 June 1943	16:05	LaGG-3	PQ 36 Ost 20161 south of Volkhov	166	24 August 1943	07:39	La-5	PQ 35 Ost 51383; 30 km (19 mi) west-northwest of Grayvoron
88♠	1 June 1943	16:10	MiG-3	PQ 36 Ost 10264; 25 km (16 mi) west-southwest of Schlüsselburg	167	25 August 1943	14:03	Boston	PQ 35 Ost 51853, Dolina; 15 km (9.3 mi) east of Bohodukhiv
89	5 June 1943	12:05	MiG-3	PQ 36 Ost 10264; 25 km (16 mi) west-southwest of Schlüsselburg	168	29 August 1943	06:46	P-39	PQ 35 Ost 43894; 30 km (19 mi) southeast of Sevsk
90	5 June 1943	12:10	P-40	PQ 36 Ost 20114 west of Volkhov	169	29 August 1943	12:25	LaGG-3	PQ 35 Ost 42133
91	5 June 1943	12:26? (Note: According to Mathews and Foreman claimed at 12:20.)	LaGG-3	PQ 36 Ost 21751; 25 km (16 mi) north-northwest of Volkhov	170	29 August 1943	12:30	LaGG-3	PQ 35 Ost 4313, Dobropolje
92	5 June 1943	12:30	P-40	PQ 36 Ost 10243; 25 km (16 mi) east-southeast of Schlüsselburg	171	31 August 1943	17:35	Yak-9	PQ 35 Ost 35381; 5 km (3.1 mi) southeast of Yelnya
93♠	8 June 1943	15:50	LaGG-3	PQ 36 Ost 20113 west of Volkhov	172	31 August 1943	17:50	La-5	PQ 35 Ost 35373; 5 km (3.1 mi) southwest of Yelnya
94♠	8 June 1943	15:55	P-40	PQ 36 Ost 20121, Wolchowstroj west of Volkhov	173	31 August 1943	17:52	Il-2	PQ 35 Ost 35381; 5 km (3.1 mi) southeast of Yelnya
95♠	8 June 1943	16:05	LaGG-3	PQ 36 Ost 20141 south of Volkhov	174♠	1 September 1943	06:00	Yak-9	PQ 35 Ost 35382; 5 km (3.1 mi) southeast of Yelnya
96♠	8 June 1943	16:12	P-40	PQ 36 Ost 10262; 25 km (16 mi) west-southwest of Schlüsselburg	175♠	1 September 1943	06:03	Yak-1? (Note: According to Mathews and Foreman claimed as a Yakovlev Yak-9.)	PQ 35 Ost 3538
97♠	8 June 1943	16:20	LaGG-3	PQ 36 Ost 10253; 30 km (19 mi) west-southwest of Schlüsselburg	176♠	1 September 1943	06:05	Yak-1	PQ 35 Ost 35383; 5 km (3.1 mi) southeast of Yelnya
98♠	8 June 1943	16:23	LaGG-3	PQ 36 Ost 10281; 35 km (22 mi) west-southwest of Volkhov	177♠	1 September 1943	06:10	Yak-1	PQ 35 Ost 35372; 5 km (3.1 mi) southwest of Yelnya
99	15 June 1943	16:30	LaGG-3	PQ 26 Ost 90134, Borkij; 10 km (6.2 mi) west of Lomonosov	178♠	1 September 1943	06:12	Yak-1	PQ 35 Ost 35371; 5 km (3.1 mi) southwest of Yelnya
100	15 June 1943	16:38	LaGG-3	PQ 26 Ost 90134, Borkij; 10 km (6.2 mi) west of Lomonosov	179♠	1 September 1943	12:10	LaGG-3	PQ 35 Ost 35454; 20 km (12 mi) west of Yelnya
101	15 June 1943	16:41	LaGG-3	PQ 26 Ost 90134, Borkij; 10 km (6.2 mi) west of Lomonosov	180♠	1 September 1943	12:12	LaGG-3	PQ 35 Ost 35343; 10 km (6.2 mi) southeast of Yelnya
102	17 June 1943	05:00	LaGG-3	PQ 36 Ost 20163 south of Volkhov	181♠	1 September 1943	12:15	LaGG-3	PQ 35 Ost 35353; 5 km (3.1 mi) northeast of Yelnya
103	17 June 1943	05:03	LaGG-3	PQ 36 Ost 20163 south of Volkhov	182♠	1 September 1943	12:18	LaGG-3	PQ 35 Ost 35354; 5 km (3.1 mi) northeast of Yelnya
104	17 June 1943	05:30	LaGG-3	PQ 36 Ost 10264; 25 km (16 mi) west-southwest of Schlüsselburg	183♠	1 September 1943	12:19	LaGG-3	PQ 35 Ost 35362; 15 km (9.3 mi) northeast of Yelnya
105	18 June 1943	06:10	Hurricane	PQ 36 Ost 20161 south of Volkhov	184♠	2 September 1943	11:03	LaGG-3	PQ 35 Ost 35371; 5 km (3.1 mi) southwest of Yelnya
106	19 June 1943	20:50	La-5	PQ 36 Ost 20121, Wolchowstroj west of Volkhov	185♠	2 September 1943	11:05	Il-2	PQ 35 Ost 3537
107	19 June 1943	20:55	LaGG-3	PQ 36 Ost 20113, Wolchowstroj west of Volkhov	186♠	2 September 1943	11:07	Il-2	PQ 35 Ost 35374; 5 km (3.1 mi) southwest of Yelnya
108	19 June 1943	21:00	LaGG-3	PQ 36 Ost 20123, Wolchowstroj west of Volkhov	187♠	2 September 1943	11:10	Il-2	PQ 35 Ost 35373; 5 km (3.1 mi) southwest of Yelnya
109♠	21 June 1943	15:30	LaGG-3	PQ 36 Ost 21754, Novaya Ladoga; 20 km (12 mi) north-northwest of Volkhov	188♠	2 September 1943	11:13	Il-2	PQ 35 Ost 25622; 20 km (12 mi) northeast of Schatalowka
110♠	21 June 1943	15:32	LaGG-3	PQ 36 Ost 2175, Novaya Ladoga	189♠	2 September 1943	11:15	LaGG-3	PQ 35 Ost 25491; 15 km (9.3 mi) west of Yelnya
111♠	21 June 1943	15:50	La-5	PQ 36 Ost 20122, north of Wolchowstroj west of Volkhov	190	5 September 1943	15:35	LaGG-3	PQ 35 Ost 35374; 5 km (3.1 mi) southwest of Yelnya
112♠	21 June 1943	19:55	La-5?	PQ 36 Ost 20133, northwest of Wolchowstroj; 45 km (28 mi) east-northeast of Chudovo	191	6 September 1943	11:00	Yak-9	PQ 35 Ost 36451; 30 km (19 mi) west-southwest of Dugino
113♠	21 June 1943	19:58	La-5	PQ 36 Ost 20124, Wolchowstroj west of Volkhov	192	6 September 1943	17:35	LaGG-3	PQ 35 Ost 2522
114♠	21 June 1943	20:08	LaGG-3	PQ 36 Ost 20124, Wolchowstroj west of Volkhov	193	7 September 1943	09:08	La-5	PQ 35 Ost 35383; 5 km (3.1 mi) southeast of Yelnya
115♠	24 June 1943	07:00	Yak-1	PQ 36 Ost 2012, Wolchowstroj	194	7 September 1943	09:15	La-5	PQ 35 Ost 3535
116♠	24 June 1943	07:03	Yak-1	PQ 36 Ost 20121, Wolchowstroj west of Volkhov	195	7 September 1943	16:30	Il-2	PQ 35 Ost 45713; 15 km (9.3 mi) south of Utrikowo
117♠	24 June 1943	07:05	Yak-1	PQ 36 Ost 20112, Wolchowstroj west of Volkhov	196♠	8 September 1943	07:30	La-5	PQ 35 Ost 35864; 25 km (16 mi) west of Kirov
118♠	24 June 1943	07:10	LaGG-3	PQ 36 Ost 20133, Wolchowstroj vicinity of Volkhov	197♠	8 September 1943	07:32	Il-2	PQ 35 Ost 35863; 25 km (16 mi) west of Kirov
119♠	24 June 1943	07:13	LaGG-3	PQ 36 Ost 20134, Wolchowstroj vicinity of Volkhov	198♠	8 September 1943	07:35	Il-2	PQ 35 Ost 35854; 30 km (19 mi) west of Kirov
120♠	24 June 1943	07:15	LaGG-3	PQ 36 Ost 20132, Wolchowstroj vicinity of Volkhov	199♠	8 September 1943	07:38	La-5	PQ 35 Ost 3582
121♠	24 June 1943	07:20	LaGG-3	PQ 36 Ost 20161, Wolchowstroj south of Volkhov	200♠	8 September 1943	07:42	La-5	PQ 35 Ost 35822; 25 km (16 mi) southwest of Spas-Demensk
122♠	24 June 1943	11:15	MiG-3	PQ 36 Ost 20182, Wolchowstroj southwest of Volkhov	201	10 September 1943	17:45	La-5	PQ 35 Ost 26473; 25 km (16 mi) northeast of Moschna
123♠	24 June 1943	11:18	MiG-3	PQ 36 Ost 20184, Wolchowstroj southwest of Volkhov	202	11 September 1943	14:50	Yak-9	PQ 35 Ost 44114; 20 km (12 mi) southwest of Kirov
124♠	24 June 1943	11:22	MiG-3	PQ 36 Ost 20194, Wolchowstroj south of Volkhov	203	11 September 1943	15:00	La-5	PQ 35 Ost 35824; 25 km (16 mi) southwest of Spas-Demensk
125	12 August 1943	08:55	La-5	PQ 35 Ost 5184, Krysino	204♠	14 September 1943	15:35	La-5	PQ 35 Ost 34422; 25 km (16 mi) east of Seschtschinskaja
126	12 August 1943	09:10	La-5	PQ 35 Ost 41694, Achtyrka	205♠	14 September 1943	15:38	Yak-9	PQ 35 Ost 34293; 30 km (19 mi) northeast of Dyatkovo
127	12 August 1943	14:00	Yak-1	PQ 35 Ost 41462, Boromlja	206♠	14 September 1943	15:50	La-5	PQ 35 Ost 3495
128	12 August 1943	14:05	La-5	PQ 35 Ost 51344, Boromlja; 45 km (28 mi) northwest of Grayvoron	207♠	14 September 1943	15:52	La-5	PQ 35 Ost 34423; 25 km (16 mi) east of Seschtschinskaja
129♠	13 August 1943	12:00	La-5	PQ 35 Ost 51843, Bohodukhiv vicinity of Bohodukhiv	208♠	14 September 1943	16:30	Pe-2	PQ 35 Ost 35571; 30 km (19 mi) south-southwest of Yelnya
130♠	13 August 1943	16:42	LaGG-3	PQ 35 Ost 61714, Dolstrik; 10 km (6.2 mi) southeast of Zolochiv	209♠	14 September 1943	16:32	La-5	PQ 35 Ost 35572; 30 km (19 mi) south-southwest of Yelnya
131♠	13 August 1943	16:55	LaGG-3	PQ 35 Ost 51834, Dolstrik; 10 km (6.2 mi) south of Zolochiv	210♠	15 September 1943	09:50	Il-2	PQ 35 Ost 35414; 20 km (12 mi) west of Yelnya
132♠	13 August 1943	17:00? (Note: According to Mathews and Foreman claimed at 17:06.)	LaGG-3	PQ 35 Ost 51832, Dolstrik; 10 km (6.2 mi) south of Zolochiv	211♠	15 September 1943	09:52	La-5	PQ 35 Ost 35371; 25 km (16 mi) south of Yelnya
133♠	13 August 1943	18:40	La-5	PQ 35 Ost 51812, Borisovka; 10 km (6.2 mi) north of Bohodukhiv	212♠	15 September 1943	10:12	Yak-9	PQ 35 Ost 35412; 20 km (12 mi) west of Yelnya
134♠	13 August 1943	18:43	La-5	PQ 35 Ost 51863, Strelitza; 15 km (9.3 mi) west of Zolochiv	213♠	15 September 1943	10:15	Pe-2	PQ 35 Ost 35341; 20 km (12 mi) south of Smolensk
135♠	13 August 1943	18:47	LaGG-3	PQ 35 Ost 51623, Grayvoron vicinity of Grayvoron	214♠	15 September 1943	10:20	Il-2	PQ 35 Ost 35343 southeast of Kritschew
136♠	13 August 1943	18:50	LaGG-3	PQ 35 Ost 51492, Borisovka; 10 km (6.2 mi) northeast of Grayvoron	215♠	15 September 1943	10:22	Il-2	PQ 35 Ost 3534
– Stab I. Gruppe of Jagdgeschwader 54 –
216	17 September 1943	17:15	La-5	PQ 35 Ost 25494, Niwki; 15 km (9.3 mi) west of Yelnya	237	12 October 1943	14:25	LaGG-3	PQ 35 Ost 15551, southeast of Leninsk; 20 km (12 mi) northeast of Gorki
217	17 September 1943	17:20	Yak-9	PQ 35 Ost 35341, Satki; 10 km (6.2 mi) southeast of Yelnya	238	12 October 1943	14:30	LaGG-3	PQ 35 Ost 15572, northeast of Gorki
218	17 September 1943	17:25	La-5	PQ 35 Ost 35372, Jelnja; 5 km (3.1 mi) southwest of Yelnya	239♠	13 October 1943	08:00	La-5	PQ 35 Ost 15553, Leninsk; 20 km (12 mi) northeast of Gorki
219	5 October 1943	16:15	Yak-9	PQ 35 Ost 0259, Tschernowiso; 15 km (9.3 mi) west-southwest of Schlüsselburg	240♠	13 October 1943	08:15	La-5	PQ 35 Ost 15581, Leninsk; 25 km (16 mi) east of Gorki
220	7 October 1943	16:15	P-39	PQ 35 Ost 17724, Woschiwka southeast of Woschiwka	241♠	13 October 1943	09:30	Il-2	north of Leninsk north of Lenin
221	7 October 1943	16:16	P-39	PQ 35 Ost 17752, Arestowo; 25 km (16 mi) southwest of Toropa	242♠	13 October 1943	09:33	La-5	PQ 35 Ost 15514, north of Leninsk south of Lenin
222	7 October 1943	16:18	P-40	PQ 35 Ost 17784, Borok	243♠	13 October 1943	09:40	La-5	PQ 35 Ost 15514, northeast of Leninsk northeast of Lenin
223	7 October 1943	16:20	P-39	PQ 35 Ost 17783, Borok; 30 km (19 mi) southwest of Toropa	244♠	13 October 1943	09:43	La-5	PQ 35 Ost 15512, southeast of Leninsk southeast of Lenin
224♠	9 October 1943	09:20	P-39	PQ 35 Ost 06111, Nevel	245♠	14 October 1943	11:15	P-40	PQ 35 Ost 15381, south of Ljady south of Lyadoff
225♠	9 October 1943	09:25	P-39	PQ 35 Ost 96232, southeast of Nevel; 10 km (6.2 mi) south of Nevel	246♠	14 October 1943	11:20	LaGG-3	PQ 35 Ost 15382, southeast of Ljady southeast of Lyadoff
226♠	9 October 1943	09:30	P-39	PQ 35 Ost 97881, south-southeast of Nevel; 10 km (6.2 mi) south of Nevel	247♠	14 October 1943	14:30	LaGG-3	PQ 35 Ost 1551, north of Ssukino north of Tsukino
227♠	9 October 1943	13:43	Il-2	southeast of Lake Ssennitza southeast of Lake Ssennizu	248♠	14 October 1943	14:32	La-5	PQ 35 Ost 15512, east of Bayewo; 20 km (12 mi) north-northeast of Krassnyj
228♠	9 October 1943	13:47	Il-2	PQ 35 Ost 06723, west of Ljuschkowo	249♠	14 October 1943	14:35	La-5	PQ 35 Ost 15512, east of Bayewo; 20 km (12 mi) north-northeast of Krassnyj
229♠	9 October 1943	15:45	P-39	PQ 35 Ost 06161, north of Rossedenje north of Kossedenje	250♠	14 October 1943	14:50	P-40	PQ 35 Ost 15374, south of Markowo
230♠	9 October 1943	15:47	P-39	PQ 35 Ost 0616, northwest of Aleksejewka; 20 km (12 mi) southwest of Tosno	251	5 November 1943	10:40	Yak-9	Lake Ssawessno; Lake Lawessno
231♠	9 October 1943	15:50	P-39	PQ 35 Ost 06162, east of Krutiki	252? (Note: This aerial victory claim is not listed by Mathews and Foreman.)	5 November 1943	10:42	Yak-9	Witebsk-Orscha
232	11 October 1943	14:20	P-39	PQ 35 Ost 06161, northeast of Wolschy Gory; 30 km (19 mi) southwest of Wolokolamsk	253	5 November 1943	10:55	Yak-9	east of Tscherneij east of Tscherung
233	11 October 1943	14:25	P-40	PQ 35 Ost 06163, southwest of Frolowo	254	10 November 1943	14:10	Il-2	PQ 35 Ost 06111, Nevel
234	11 October 1943	14:27	LaGG-3	PQ 35 Ost 06243, northeast of Bruj	255	10 November 1943	14:20	Yak-9	1 km (0.62 mi) east of Nossikowo; 1 km (0.62 mi) east of Nossikowo
235	11 October 1943	14:29	P-40	PQ 35 Ost 06271, northeast of Gorowatka	256	12 November 1943	10:05	Yak-9	1 km (0.62 mi) south of Lake Ssawessno; 3 km (1.9 mi) south of Lake Lawessno
236	12 October 1943	14:20	LaGG-3	PQ 35 Ost 15714, north Nikolskoje					
– Stab III. Gruppe of Jagdgeschwader 6 –
257	7 October 1944	11:30	B-24	PQ 05 Ost GQ-1 northwest of Bramsche					
– Kommando Nowotny –
—	8 November 1944	—	B-17		—	8 November 1944	—	P-51	
