= Hans Döbrich =

German World War II fighter pilot (1916–1984)

- Born: 24 March 1916; Sonneberg, Saxe-Meiningen
- Died: 6 April 1984 (aged 68); Vienna, Austria
- Relatives: Albin Döbrich (father)
- Military career
- Allegiance: Nazi Germany
- Branch: Luftwaffe
- Service years: 1940–1945
- Rank: Oberleutnant (first lieutenant)
- Unit: 6./JG 5
- Conflicts: World War II: Eastern Front
- Awards: Knight's Cross of the Iron Cross

Hans Friedrich Döbrich (24 March 1916 – 6 April 1984) was a Luftwaffe fighter ace and recipient of the Knight's Cross of the Iron Cross during World War II. The Knight's Cross of the Iron Cross, and its variants were the highest awards in the military and paramilitary forces of Nazi Germany during World War II. Döbrich was credited with 65 victories. All his victories were recorded over the Eastern Front. Döbrich died on 6 April 1984 from heart problems at the age of 68 in Vienna, Austria.

== Early life and career ==
Döbrich was born on 24 March 1916 in Sonneberg, at the time in Saxe-Meiningen within the German Empire, present-day in Thuringia. He was the fourth and youngest child of the Austrian sculptor Albin Döbrich and his wife Anna, née Eckl. He had an older brother Albin, and two older sisters, Josephine and Hertha.

The hyperinflation in the Weimar Republic that followed World War I in Germany forced Albin Döbrich to seek employment elsewhere. In late 1923, Döbrich's father was hired by the Vienna Porcelain Manufactory Augarten located in Vienna, Austria. The family moved to Vienna in early 1924. Following the Anschluss in March 1938, the forced incorporation of Austria into Nazi Germany, Döbrich joined the National Socialist Flyers Corps (NSFK). On 17 October, he was hired by Siemens-Schuckert, working in construction of electrical transformers.

== World War II ==
On Friday 1 September 1939 German forces had invaded Poland which marked the beginning of World War II. Döbrich joined the military service of the Luftwaffe on 10 January 1940. He received his military basic training with Fliegerausbildungs-Regiment 72 (72nd Flight Training Regiment) at Fels am Wagram. Döbrich received flight training, (Note: Flight training in the Luftwaffe progressed through the levels A1, A2 and B1, B2, referred to as A/B flight training. A training included theoretical and practical training in aerobatics, navigation, long-distance flights and dead-stick landings. The B courses included high-altitude flights, instrument flights, night landings and training to handle the aircraft in difficult situations.) making his first flight with a flight instructor on a Focke-Wulf Fw 44 Stieglitz on 2 September. On 13 August 1941, Döbrich started his fighter pilot training at the Jagdfliegerschule 2 (2nd fighter pilot school), in Zerbst. He made his maiden flight on the Messerschmitt Bf 109 on 15 September. On 6 January 1942, after 852 training flights, Döbrich completed his fighter pilot training.

=== War on the Arctic Front ===
On 7 January 1942, Döbrich was posted to 1. Staffel (1st squadron) of Jagdgeschwader 5 (JG 5—5th Fighter Wing). Before joining this unit, he went on home leave for a few weeks. JG 5 had just been created and placed under the command of Oberst Carl-Alfred Schumacher while 1. Staffel was under command of Oberleutnant Horst Carganico based at Stavanger-Sola. On 21 March, 1. Staffel was subordinated to II. Gruppe (2nd group) of JG 5, commanded by Major Hennig Strümpell, and became the 6. Staffel of JG 5. The Staffel was then based at the Petsamo-Luostari Airfield on the Eismeerfront (Ice Sea Front)—the area of operations nearest the Arctic Ocean.

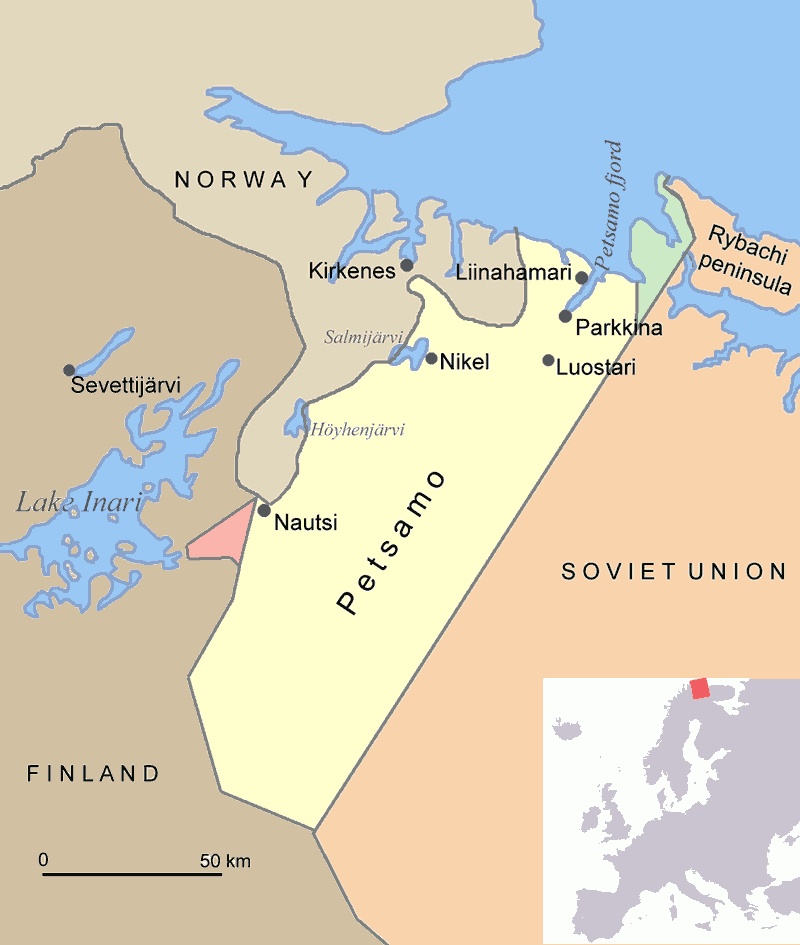
Area of operations.

In the morning of 24 April, 6. Staffel escorted Junkers Ju 87 dive bombers to Murmansk. Over the target area, the German formation came under attack by Hawker Hurricane fighters. In this encounter, Döbrich claimed his first aerial victory. Two days later, he was awarded the Iron Cross 2nd Class (Eisernes Kreuz zweiter Klasse). On 28 April between 12:15 and 13:00, the Staffel engaged in aerial combat with a formation of Hurricanes from 2 GvShAP (Guards Ground-Attack Aviation Regiment—Gvardeyskiy Shturmovoy Aviatsionnyy Polk). Without claiming an aerial victory, Döbrich's Bf 109 sustained minor combat damage. On 29 April around midday, 6. Staffel intercepted a flight of seven Polikarpov I-153s from 27 IAP (Fighter Aviation Regiment—Istrebitelny Aviatsionny Polk) and 14 Hurricanes from 78 IAP over the Litsa bight. In this encounter, Döbrich claimed an I-153 shot down.

On 27 June, Döbrich received the Front Flying Clasp of the Luftwaffe in Silver (Frontflugspange in Silber). On 19 July, Döbrich made a forced landing 20 kilometres (12 miles) west of Murmashi Russia in his Bf 109 F-4 trop (Werknummer 10169—factory number) "Yellow 9" following aerial combat. Döbrich, who had been injured, walked back to his unit, returning on 26 July. On 17 August, Döbrich was awarded the Honor Goblet of the Luftwaffe (Ehrenpokal der Luftwaffe). Four days later, eight Bf 109 F fighters from 6. Staffel took off at 15:12, escorting Messerschmitt Bf 110 destroyer heavy fighters to Murmashi. Following the attack of destroyers, the flight came under attack by approximately 35 Soviet fighters. In this aerial battle, Döbrich claimed an I-180, an early Luftwaffe designation for the Yakovlev Yak-7, and a Yakovlev Yak-1 shot down. On this mission, Oberleutnant Hans-Dieter Hartwein, the commander of 6. Staffel, was killed in action. In consequence, Leutnant Heinrich Ehrler was given command of the Staffel.

Döbrich was awarded the German Cross in Gold (Deutsches Kreuz in Gold) on 15 October. The presentation was made a few days after by Generaloberst Hans-Jürgen Stumpff, the commander-in-chief of Luftflotte 5 (Air Fleet 5). On 5 June 1943, Döbrich claimed four aerial victories. On two consecutive combat missions, he was credited with two Hurricanes shot down on each mission.

=== Wounded in combat to end of war ===
On 16 July 1943, whilst flying Messerschmitt Bf 109 G-6 (Werknummer 20088), Döbrich was wounded by enemy fighters after downing two aircraft and was forced to bail out 20 kilometres (12 miles) west of the Rybachy Peninsula into Petsamo Fjord, Finland. He was rescued by a Kriegsmarine Minenräumboot (minesweeper) and taken ashore and then flown on a Fieseler Fi 156 Storch to a Luftwaffe hospital at Kirkenes. While hospitalized, he was awarded the Knight's Cross of the Iron Cross (Ritterkreuz des Eisernen Kreuzes) on 19 September 1943. The presentation was made at the hospital by Generalmajor Ernst-August Roth, at the time Fliegerführer Nord.

In December 1943, Döbrich was released from the Luftwaffe hospital in Kirkenes and spent Christmas with his family. Since he still hadn't fully recovered from his injuries, he spent most of 1944 in the Luftwaffe hospital 4/XVII in Vienna, interrupted by occasional visits to his family. In 1944, Döbrich was promoted to Fahnenjunker-Feldwebel and to Leutnant (second lieutenant) on 1 November 1944. On 5 April 1945, the Frontleitstelle Wien, front dispatch center based at Vienna, ordered him to Berlin. The next day, Döbrich began his journey which ended in a hospital in Traunstein. The injuries sustained, occasionally rendered his left leg paralyzed. He was promoted to Oberleutnant (first lieutenant) and discharged from the Wehrmacht on 27 April. Following end of World War II in Europe, Döbricht was captured by US-forces in the hospital at Traunstein and became a prisoner of war.

== Later life ==
Döbricht was discharged from the hospital on 13 March 1946 and officially released as a prisoner of war on 1 April. He then returned to his family in Vienna. On 11 April he was hired by the fashion house "Kosak". His work there ended on 31 December 1947. In December 1947, he also received notice that his prewar employment with Siemens-Schuckert had officially ended on 15 December 1947. Following three weeks of unemployment, Döbrich found work with the Erste österreichische Zahnräderfabrik Rudolf Kienast (First Austrian Gear Factory Rudolf Kienast) where he worked from 19 January 1948 to 25 January 1954 in quality assurance.

On 21 July 1955, Döbrich married Magarethe in Vienna. The marriage remained childless. Döbrich and his wife emigrated to the United States where he worked in construction. In November 1969, the family returned to Austria. Döbrich then worked as a consultant for heavy transport helicopters from Sikorsky Aircraft. In June 1971, Döbrich received a coronary artery bypass surgery led by Professor Johann Navrátil at the Hanusch Hospital in Vienna. He died on 6 April 1984 from pulmonary embolism resulting from further heart problems at the age of 68 in Vienna. He was buried at Stammersdorf Central Cemetery.

== Summary of career ==
=== Aerial victory claims ===
According to US historian David T. Zabecki, Döbrich was credited with 65 aerial victories. Spick also lists him with 65 aerial victories claimed in 248 combat missions, all of which one on the Eastern Front, and a mission-to-claim ratio of 3.82. Mathews and Foreman, authors of Luftwaffe Aces — Biographies and Victory Claims, researched the German Federal Archives and found records for 65 aerial victory claims, plus one further unconfirmed claim, all of which claimed on the Eastern Front.

Victory claims were logged to a map-reference (PQ = Planquadrat), for example "PQ 36 Ost 39172". The Luftwaffe grid map (Jägermeldenetz) covered all of Europe, western Russia and North Africa and was composed of rectangles measuring 15 minutes of latitude by 30 minutes of longitude, an area of about 360 square miles (930 km^{2}). These sectors were then subdivided into 36 smaller units to give a location area 3 km × 4 km (1.9 mi × 2.5 mi) in size.

Chronicle of aerial victories
This and the ? (exclamation mark) indicates information discrepancies listed by Prien, Stemmer, Rodeike, Bock, Mombeek, Mathews, and Foreman.
Claim	Date	Time	Type	Location	Claim	Date	Time	Type	Location
– 6. Staffel of Jagdgeschwader 5 – Eastern Front and northern Norway, and Finland — 6 December 1941 – 31 December 1942
1	24 April 1942	09:22	Hurricane	1 km (0.62 mi) west of Murmansk	23	21 August 1942	15:28	I-180 (Yak-7)	
2	29 April 1942	12:43	I-153	8 km (5.0 mi) west of Zapadnaya Litsa bight	24	21 August 1942	15:33	Yak-1	
3	18 May 1942	—	Hurricane	10 km (6.2 mi) southwest of Murmansk	25	25 August 1942	15:27	P-40	
4	19 May 1942	09:23	Hurricane	Murmashi	26	2 September 1942	11:20	Yak-1	
5	19 May 1942	15:59	Hurricane	10 km (6.2 mi) southwest of Murmashi	27	5 September 1942	08:28	P-40	
6	28 May 1942	12:18	Hurricane	5 km (3.1 mi) southwest of Kola	28	8 September 1942	11:41	I-153	vicinity of Kola
7	28 May 1942	12:20	Hurricane	4 km (2.5 mi) west of Kola	29	8 September 1942	15:01	Hurricane	vicinity of Kola
8	29 May 1942	23:15	Hurricane	southeast of Eyna Guba	30	9 September 1942	10:49	Hurricane	vicinity of Kola
9	30 May 1942	09:18	Hurricane	Kola Bay	31	9 September 1942	11:01	Hurricane	vicinity of Kola
10	2 June 1942	—	Hurricane	35 km (22 mi) west of Murmansk	32	15 September 1942	14:20	P-40	
11	13 June 1942	16:01	Hurricane	10 km (6.2 mi) west of Murmansk	33	15 September 1942	14:32? (Note: According to Mombeek claimed at 14:33.)	Hurricane	
12	22 June 1942	22:36	Hurricane	5 km (3.1 mi) west of Kola	34	19 September 1942	14:02	Hurricane	
13	23 June 1942	08:15	Hurricane	5 km (3.1 mi) west of Kola	35	19 September 1942	14:05	Hurricane	
14	23 June 1942	15:33	Hurricane	8 km (5.0 mi) southwest of Kola	36	22 September 1942	15:01? (Note: According to Mombeek claimed at 15:00.)	Hurricane	4 km (2.5 mi) west of Murmashi
15	24 June 1942	07:00+	Hurricane	10 km (6.2 mi) west of Kola	37	27 September 1942	11:44	P-40	
16	24 June 1942	07:00+	Hurricane	8 km (5.0 mi) west of Kola	38	27 September 1942	11:51	P-40	
17	29 June 1942	10:58	Hurricane	5 km (3.1 mi) east of Shonguy	39	27 September 1942	15:57	Yak-1	
18	30 June 1942	21:00+	P-40	20 km (12 mi) southeast of Pechenga airfield	40	30 October 1942	12:15	P-40	
19	7 July 1942	17:00+	I-180 (Yak-7)	10 km (6.2 mi) west of Kola	41	30 October 1942	12:23	P-40	
20	7 August 1942	17:15	P-40		42	30 October 1942	14:55	P-40	
21	7 August 1942	17:21	P-40		43	5 November 1942	11:04	P-39? (Note: According to Mombeek, Mathews, and Foreman claimed as a Curtiss P-40 Warhawk.)	
22	13 August 1942	17:21	P-40						
– 6. Staffel of Jagdgeschwader 5 – Eastern Front and northern Norway, and Finland — 1 January – 16 July 1943
44	5 March 1943	16:30	Yak-1	Lake Tolwand	55	5 June 1943	03:50? (Note: According to Mombeek claimed at 03:51.)	Hurricane	
45	10 March 1943	09:58? (Note: According to Mombeek claimed at 09:59.)	P-39	vicinity of Murmashi	56	5 June 1943	05:10? (Note: According to Mombeek claimed at 05:18.)	Hurricane	
46	10 March 1943	10:03	P-40	vicinity of Murmashi	57	5 June 1943	05:13? (Note: According to Mombeek claimed at 05:19.)	Hurricane	
47	12 March 1943	14:22	P-40	vicinity of Murmashi	58	15 June 1943	23:01	P-39	
48	12 March 1943	14:30	P-39	vicinity of Murmashi	59	15 June 1943	23:06	P-39	
49	23 March 1943	14:18	P-40	Shonguy	60	20 June 1943	16:32	Hurricane	Kandalaksha
50	23 March 1943	14:23	P-40	PQ 36 Ost 39172, 14 km (8.7 mi) south of Murmansk	61	21 June 1943	19:37	P-40	PQ 36 Ost 1723, 10 km (6.2 mi) west of Rutschi
—	25 March 1943	—	Il-2		62	21 June 1943	19:40	P-40	PQ 36 Ost 2711, 4 km (2.5 mi) west of Rutschi
51	27 March 1943	14:02	P-40		63	9 July 1943	04:42	Il-2	
52	28 March 1943	11:42	P-40		64	16 July 1943	—	P-40	west of Pechenga Bay
53	3 June 1943	17:25? (Note: According to Mombeek, Mathews and Foreman claimed at 17:35.)	P-39	over sea	65	16 July 1943	—	P-40	west of Pechenga Bay
54	5 June 1943	03:48? (Note: According to Mombeek claimed at 03:46.)	Hurricane						

=== Awards ===
- Iron Cross (1939)
  - 2nd Class (26 April 1942)
  - 1st Class (26 May 1942)
- Front Flying Clasp of the Luftwaffe for Fighter Pilots
  - in Silver (27 June 1942)
  - in Gold (26 October 1942)
- Honor Goblet of the Luftwaffe on 17 August 1942 as Unteroffizier and pilot
- German Cross in Gold on 15 October 1942 as Unteroffizier in the 6./Jagdgeschwader 5
- Wound Badge in Black (16 July 1943)
- Knight's Cross of the Iron Cross on 19 September 1943 as Feldwebel and pilot in the 6./Jagdgeschwader 5

=== Dates of rank ===
May 1942:	Unteroffizier
1 November 1942:	Feldwebel
1 August 1944:	Leutnant (second lieutenant), war officer, effective as of 1 August 1944
April 1945:	Oberleutnant (first lieutenant)
