= Vardø Chapel =

- Vardø kapell / Steglnes kapell
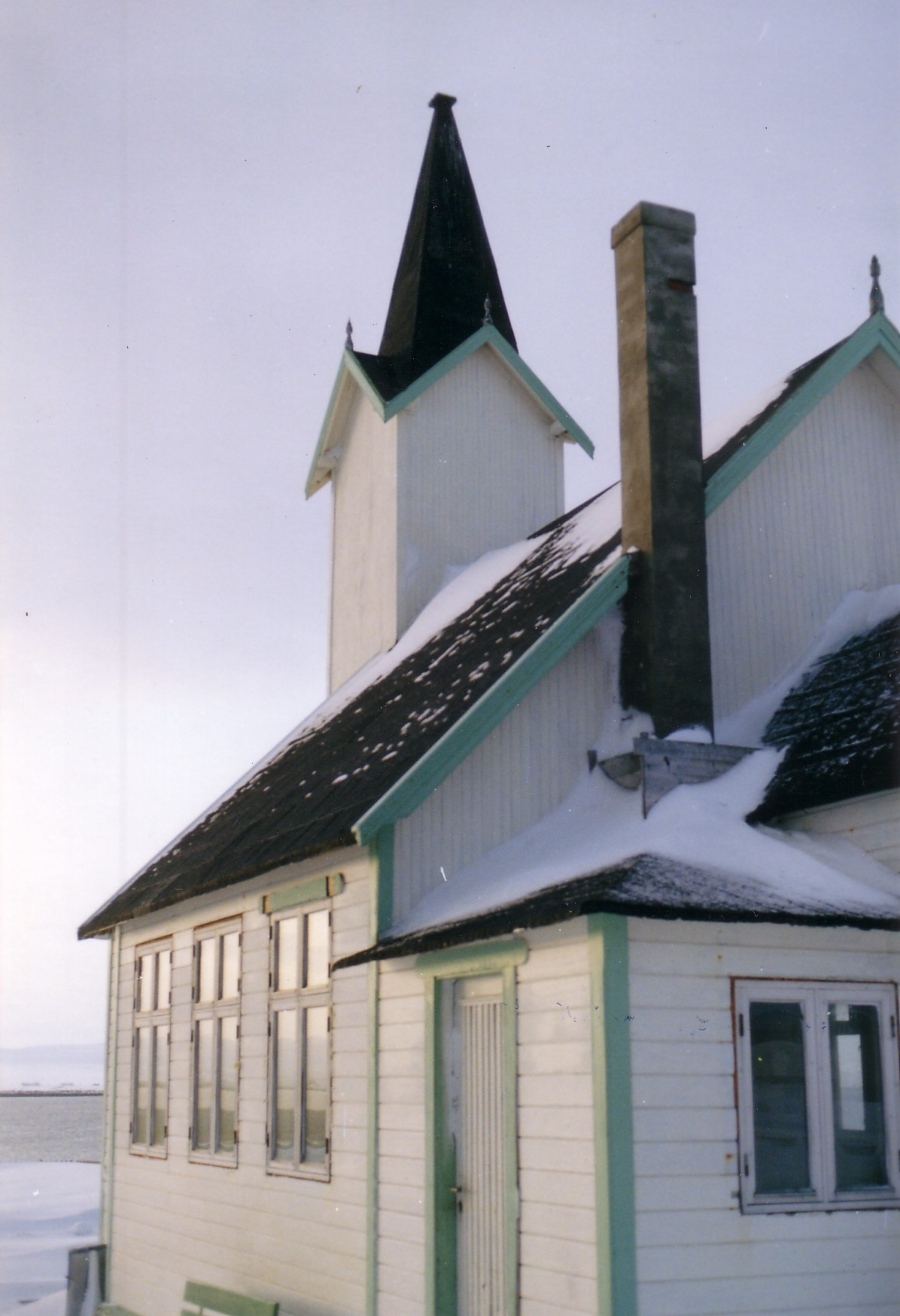
- View of the chapel
- Vardø Chapel
- 70.370278°N 31.095833°E
- Location: Vardø, Finnmark
- Country: Norway
- Denomination: Church of Norway
- Churchmanship: Evangelical Lutheran

History
- Status: Chapel

Architecture
- Functional status: Active
- Architectural type: Long church
- Completed: 1908 (118 years ago)

Specifications
- Capacity: 40
- Materials: Wood

Administration
- Diocese: Nord-Hålogaland
- Deanery: Varanger prosti
- Parish: Vardø

Vardø Chapel or Steglnes Chapel (Norwegian: Vardø kapell / Steglnes kapell) is a chapel of the Church of Norway in Vardø Municipality in Finnmark county, Norway. It is located on the western part of the island of Vardøya in the town of Vardø, just south of the historic Vardøhus Fortress. It is an annex chapel for the Vardø parish which is part of the Varanger prosti (deanery) in the Diocese of Nord-Hålogaland.

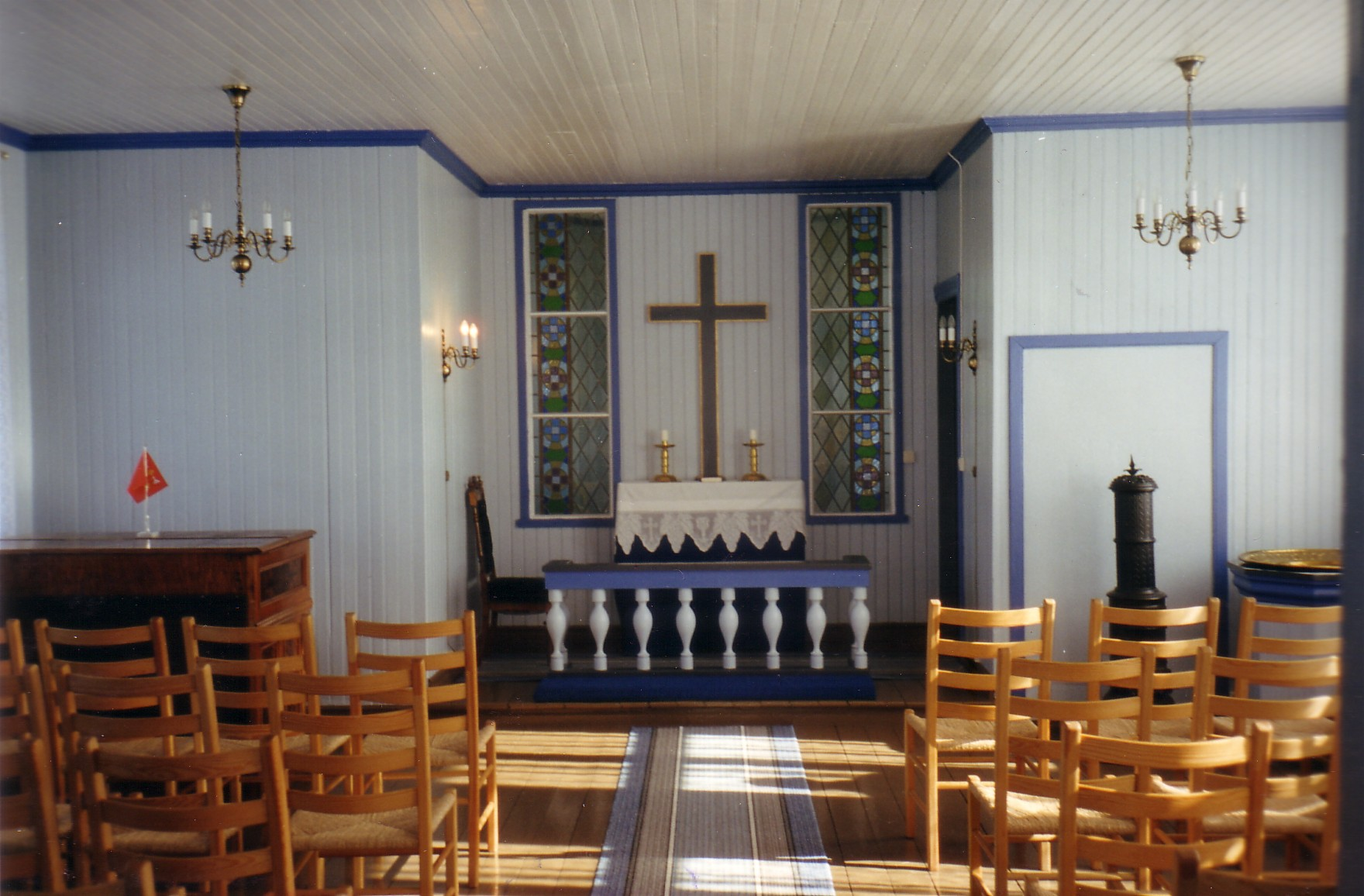
Interior view

The small white chapel was built in 1908 at the site of the new parish cemetery. It has mostly been used for funerals, but more recently it has been opened up for weddings and baptisms also. Unlike most churches in Finnmark county, this one was not burned down during World War II.

== See also ==
- List of churches in Nord-Hålogaland
