= Vardø Church =

- Vardø kirke
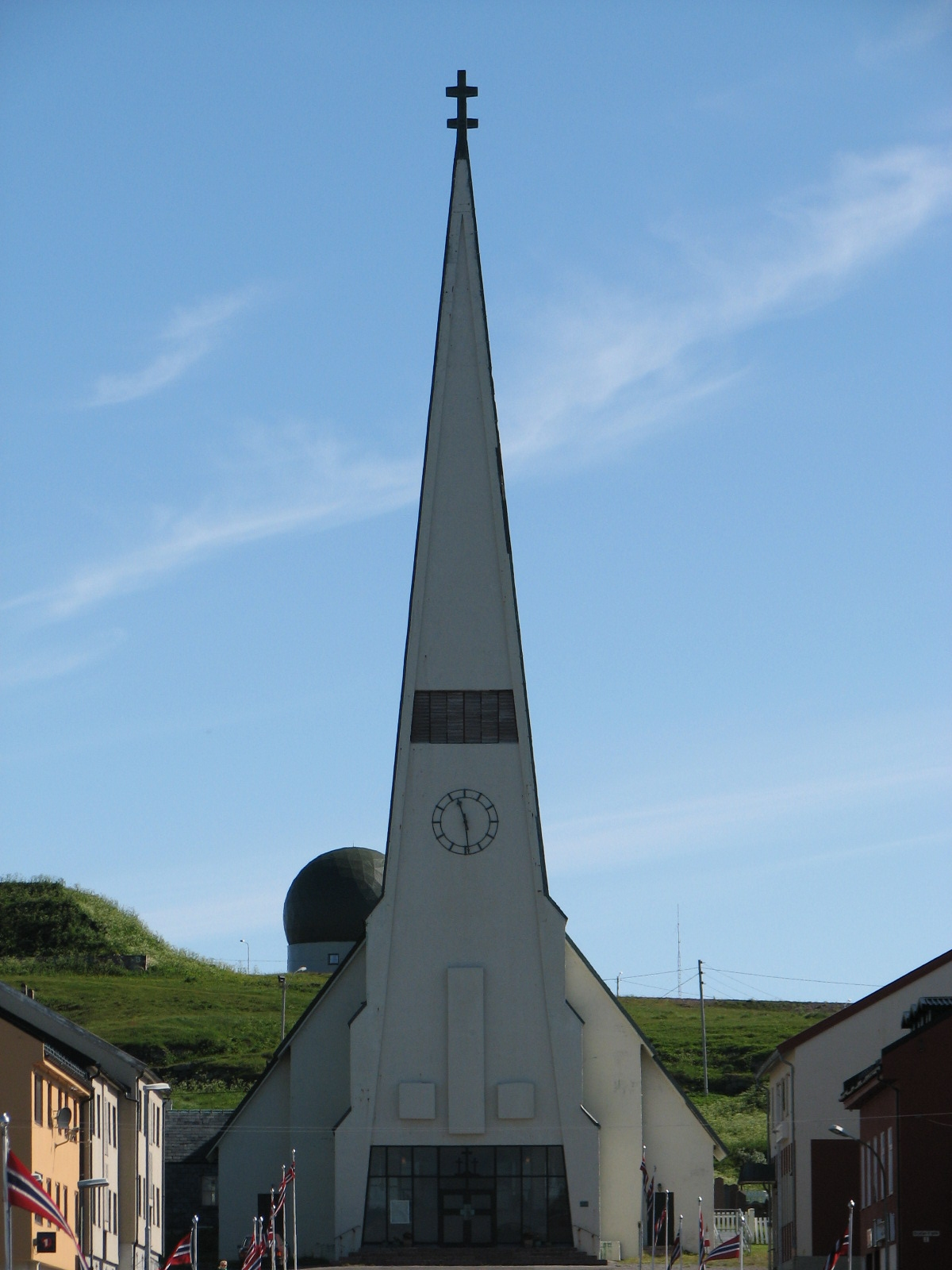
- View of the church
- Vardø Church
- 70.370278°N 31.111944°E
- Location: Vardø, Finnmark
- Country: Norway
- Denomination: Church of Norway
- Churchmanship: Evangelical Lutheran

History
- Status: Parish church
- Founded: c. 1307
- Consecrated: 5 Oct 1958

Architecture
- Functional status: Active
- Architect: Eyvind Moestue
- Architectural type: Long church
- Completed: 1958 (68 years ago)

Specifications
- Capacity: 432
- Materials: Concrete

Administration
- Diocese: Nord-Hålogaland
- Deanery: Varanger prosti
- Parish: Vardø

Vardø Church (Norwegian: Vardø kirke) is a parish church of the Church of Norway in Vardø Municipality in Finnmark county, Norway. It is located in the town of Vardø on the island of Vardøya. It is the main church for the Vardø parish which is part of the Varanger prosti (deanery) in the Diocese of Nord-Hålogaland. The white, modern, concrete church was built in a long church style in 1958 by the architect Eyvind Moestue. It has a high roof with a steep pitch, with a tall triangular steeple. The church seats about 432 people.

== History ==
The earliest existing historical records of the church date back to the year 1307 when the oldest known church in Vardø was consecrated by the Archbishop Jorundr which is around the time that this part of Northern Norway was settled by Norwegians. The first church in Vardø was located about 190 metres (620 ft) south of the present site of the church. Not much is known about the first church, but in 1599 the church is described as a small timber building with room for about 100 people. A map from 1601 depicts the building outline which shows that it was a long church with a rectangular nave and a narrower chancel on the east end and a small entry porch on the west end. It is possible that there was a small tower or onion dome on top of the roof.

In a 1709 inspection, the church was described as "just about to collapse", so plans were made for a new church. In 1714, a new timber-framed, cruciform building was constructed about 190 metres (620 ft) north of the old church site. After the new church was opened, the old church was used for storage for a few years and was torn down around 1716.

In 1814, this church served as an election church (Norwegian: valgkirke). Together with more than 300 other parish churches across Norway, it was a polling station for elections to the 1814 Norwegian Constituent Assembly which wrote the Constitution of Norway. This was Norway's first national elections. Each church parish was a constituency that elected people called "electors" who later met together in each county to elect the representatives for the assembly that was to meet in Eidsvoll later that year.

In 1869, the old church was torn down and a new church was constructed on the same site. The new building was designed by the architect Christian Heinrich Grosch. That wooden church stood for about 75 years before it was burned down by the retreating Germans near the end of World War II. The parishioners met in a temporary house church from 1944 until the present church was completed in 1958. The new concrete church building was consecrated on 5 October 1958.

== Media gallery ==
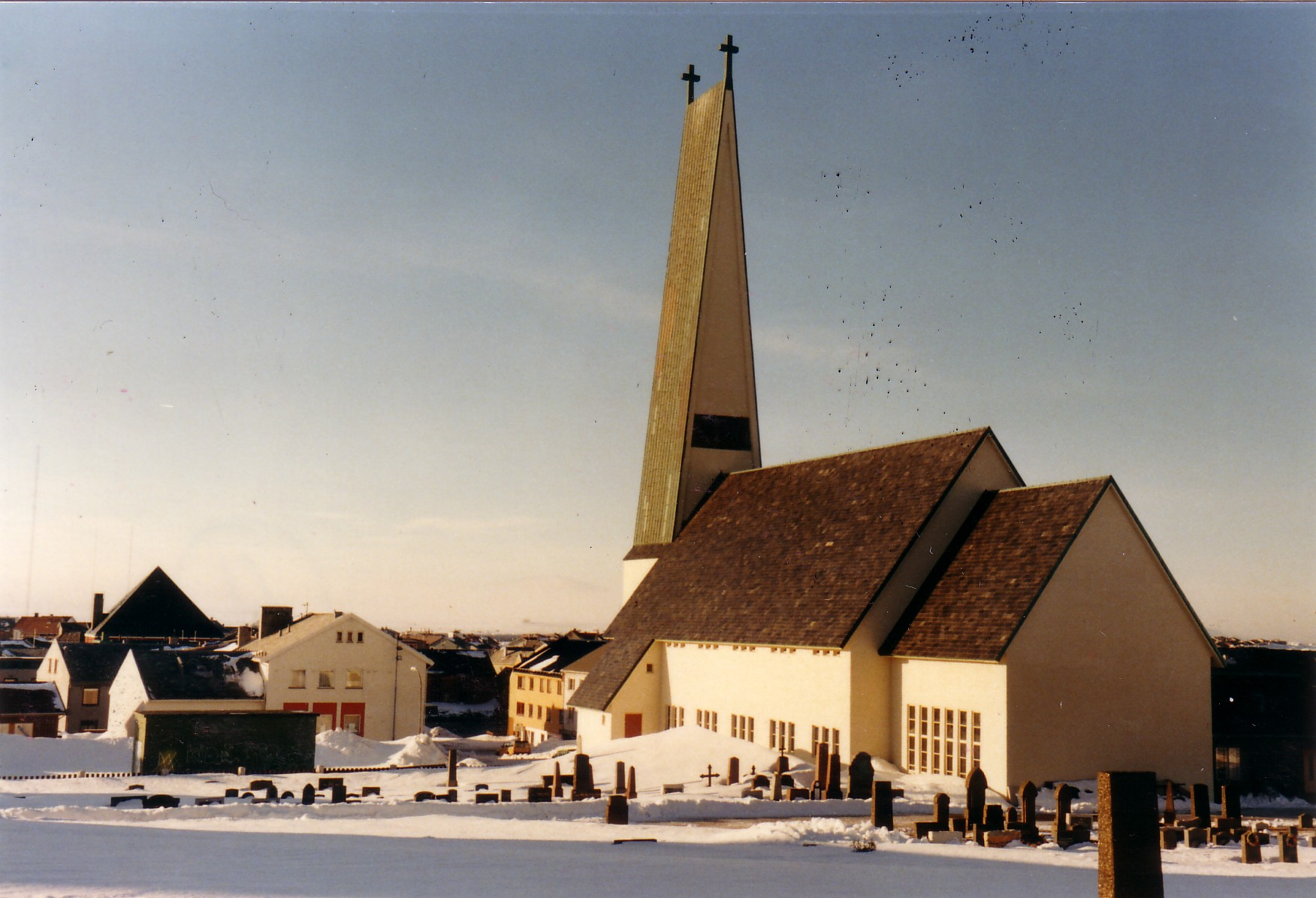

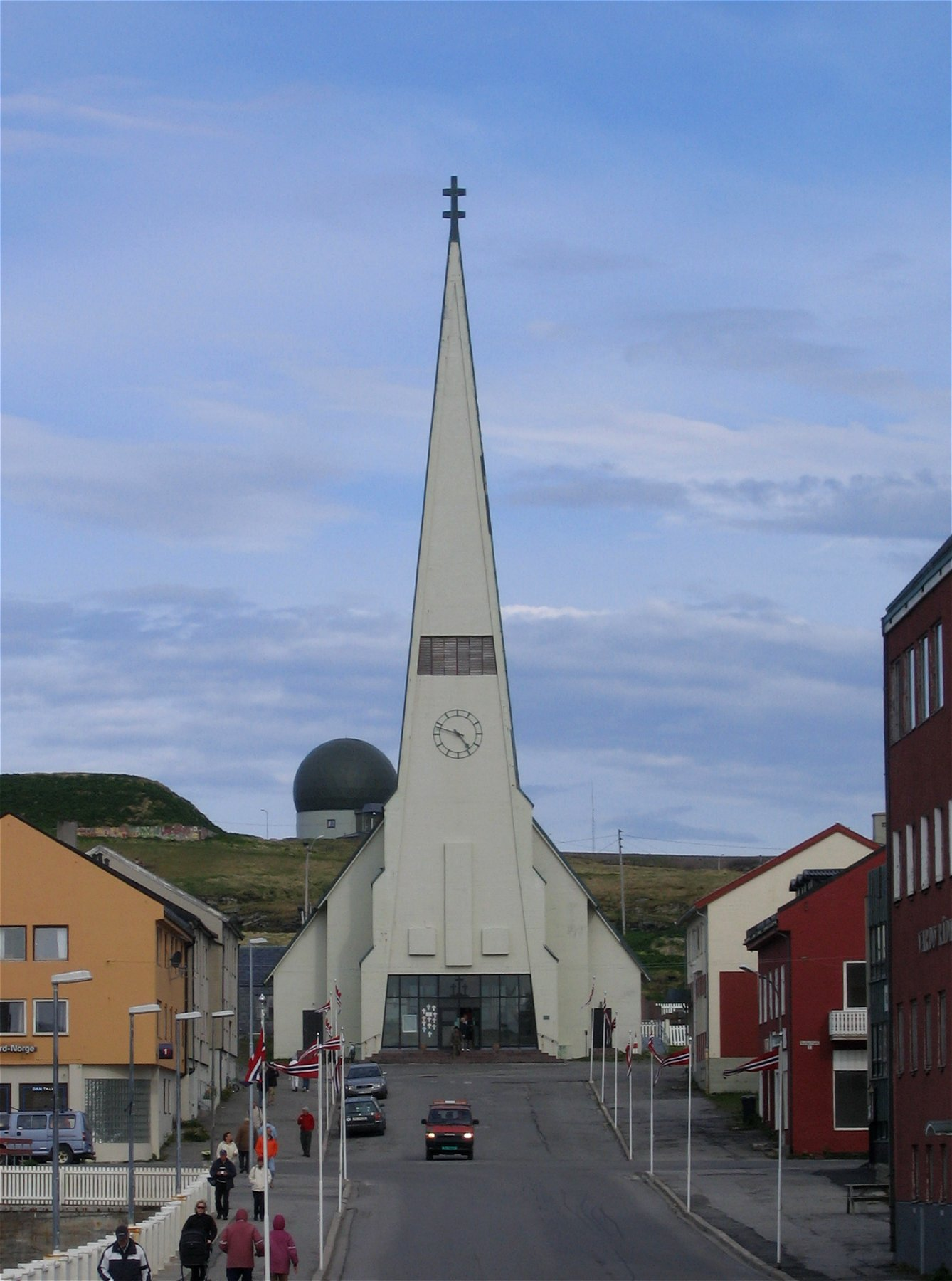

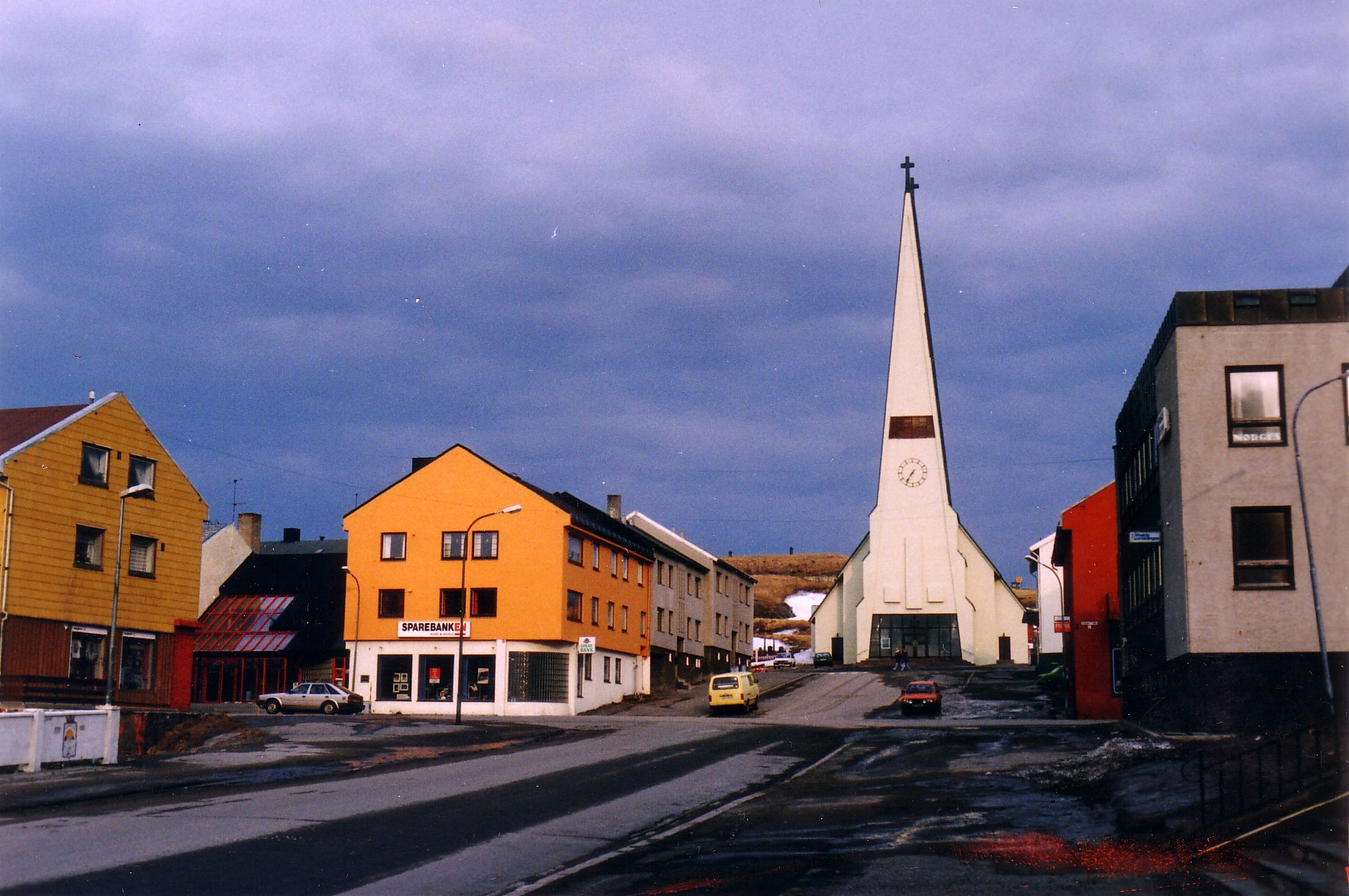

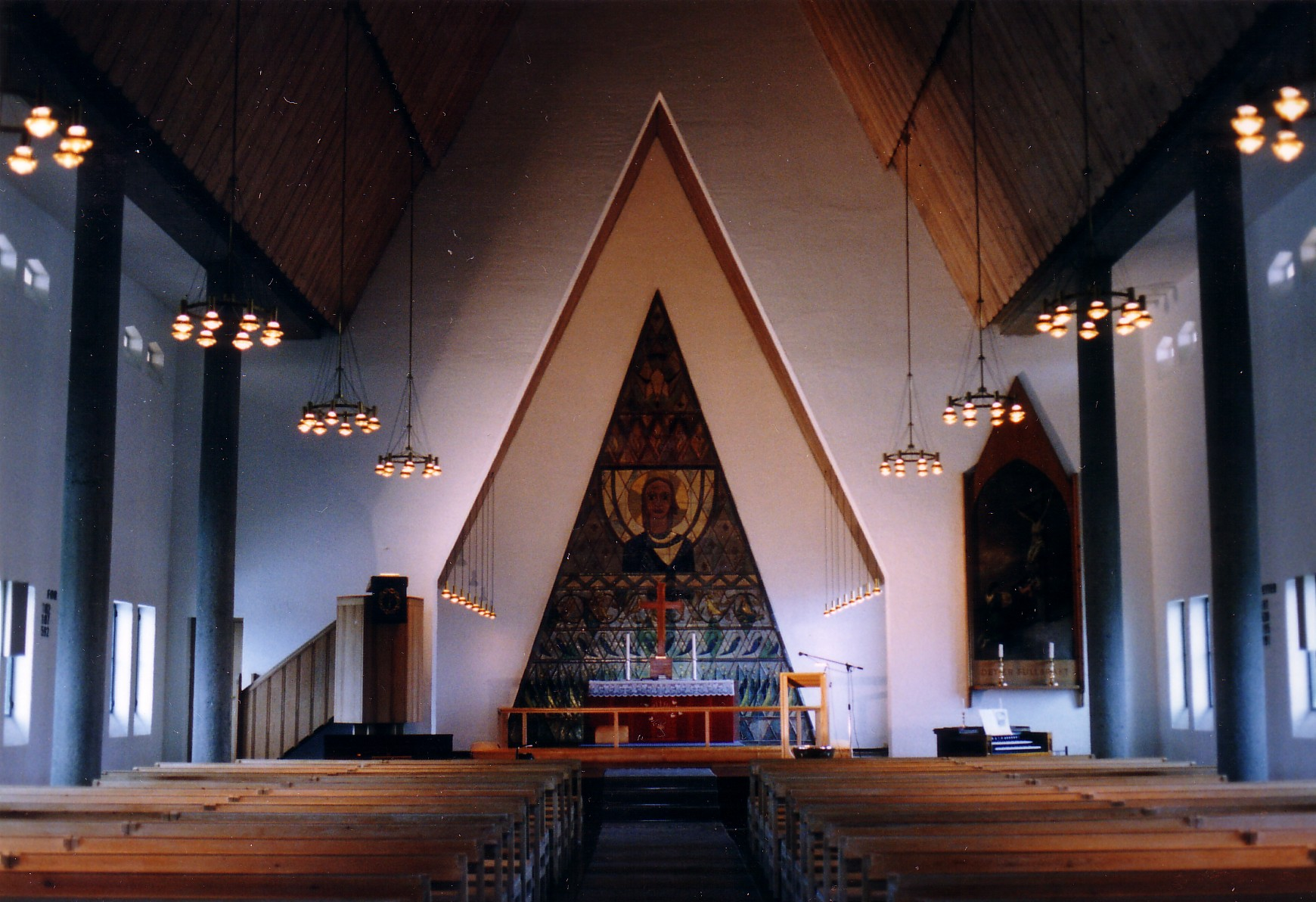

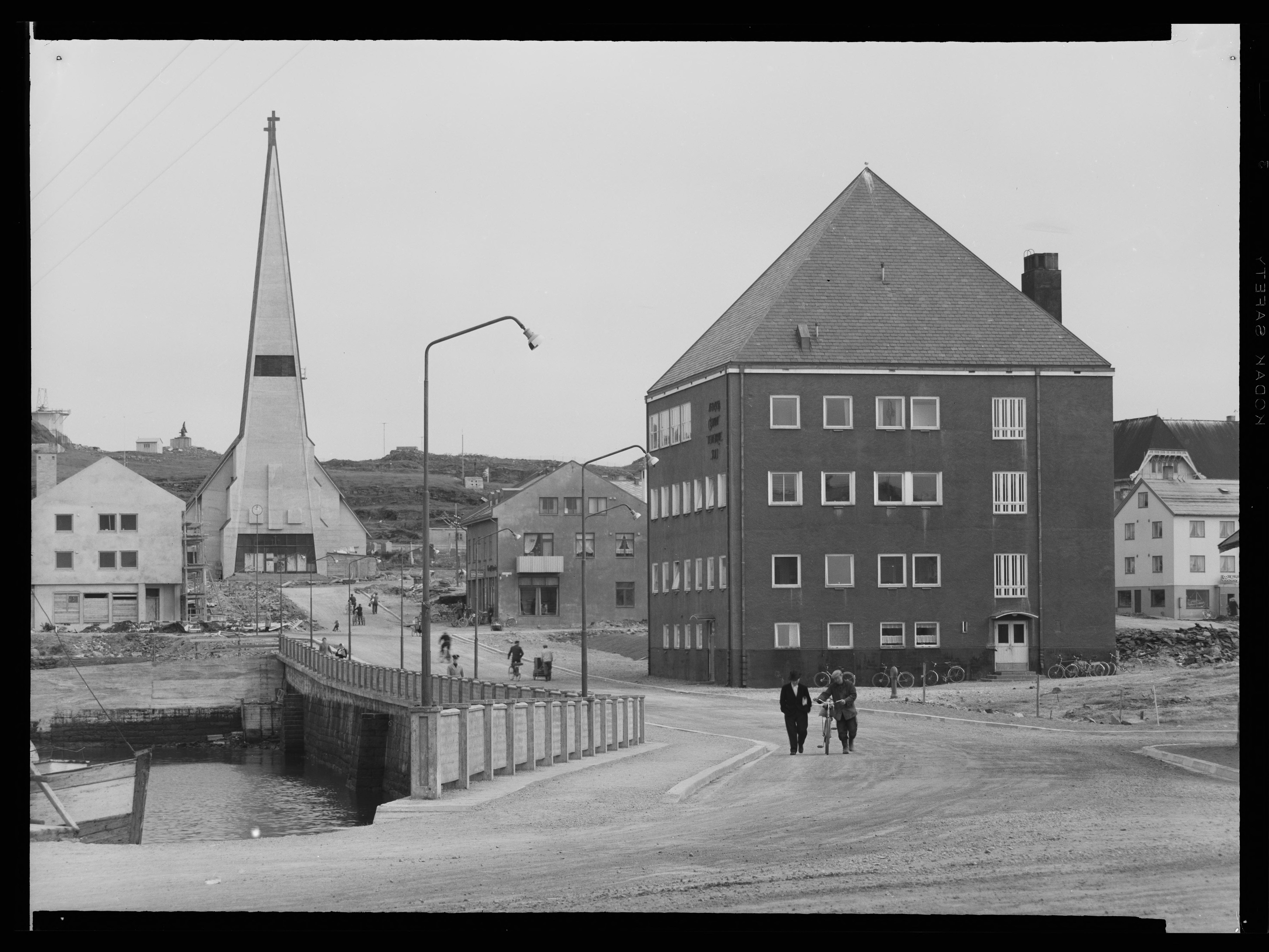

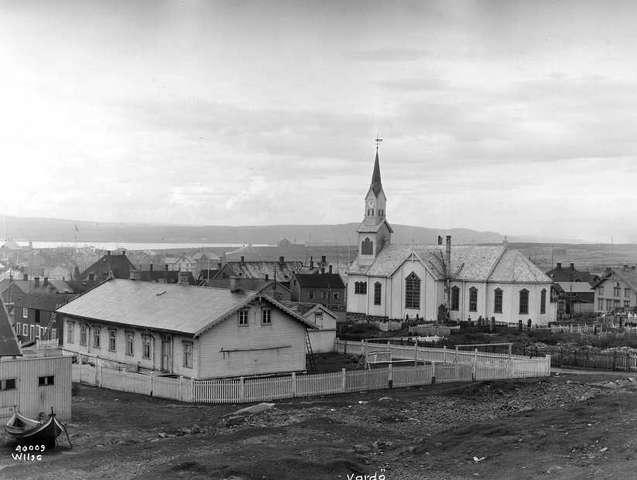
Old church (1933)

== See also ==
- List of churches in Nord-Hålogaland
