= Coat of arms of Vardø =

Coat of arms of Vardø

The Coat of arms of Vardø is the official coat of arms for Vardø Municipality (including the town of Vardø) in Finnmark county, Norway. The arms have remained the same since 1887 when they were designed by R. Haavin. The arms often are shown with a mural crown on top to show Vardø's town status.

The shield is pale blue and has a border of three bands in red, silver and dark blue. The charges are a golden sun behind two ships, one red and one black, with golden sails above a silver codfish. A golden mural crown with five towers is mounted on the shield. The coat of arms is not in keeping with the general trend of Norwegian municipal coats of arms because it has seven colours and multiple motifs (most coats of arms have two or three colors and a much simpler design).

The municipality of Vardø is centered on the town of Vardø, which received its town status from King Christian VII of Norway on 17 July 1789. The year 1789, the Latin motto of the town Cedant tenebræ soli ("Darkness must give way for the sun"), and the descriptive text Vardöensis insignia urbis are all also featured on the shield.
