= Urgraves =

Pre-Christianity Sámi burial custom

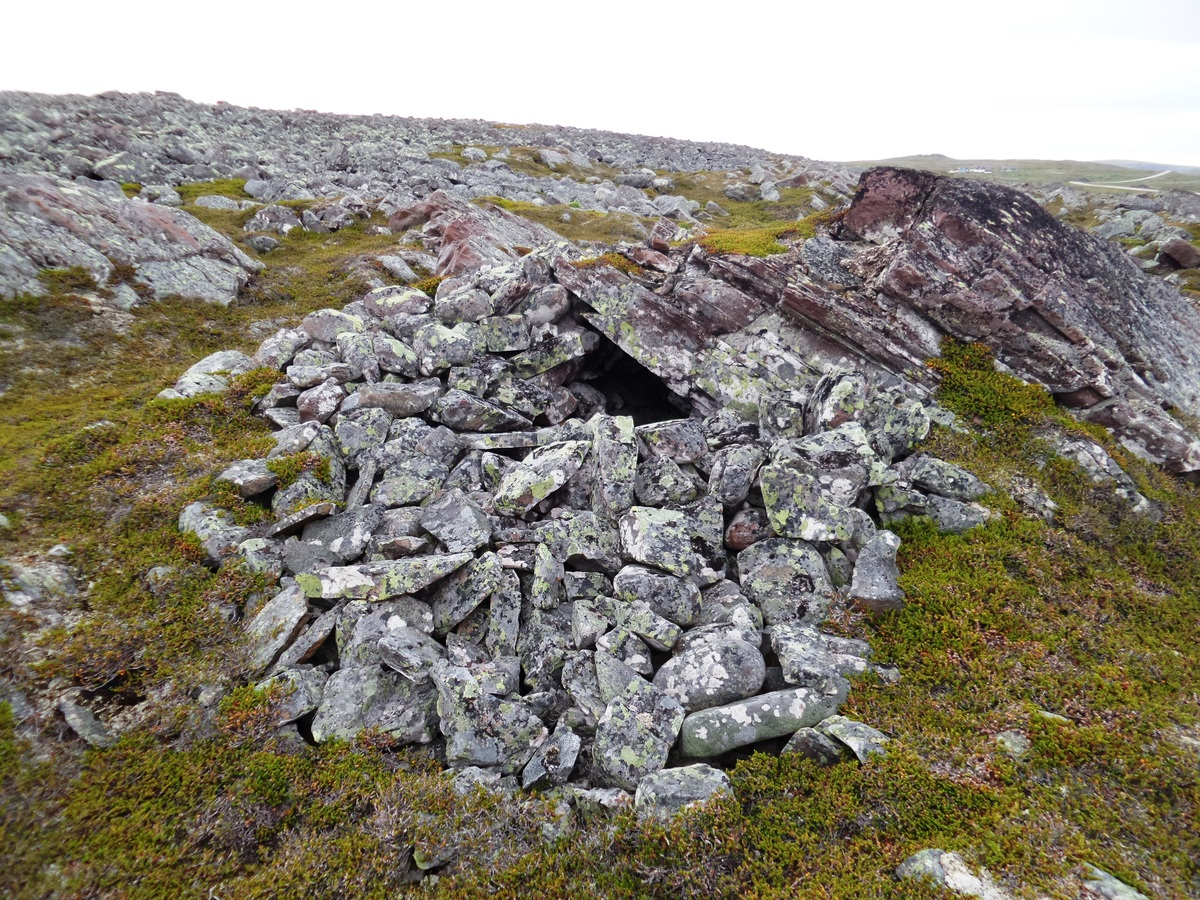
Urgrave by Kramvik, Vardø, Norway. Credit: Frans-Arne Stylegar

Urgraves are a pre-Christian Sami burial custom. The graves were placed in the terrain, often in a large stone ur where the body was placed under the boulders. They can also be placed under rock overhangs. The body may lie in simple table coffins or it may be wrapped in fists. Sometimes the dead can lie in a sled.

The ancient graves date back to around 900 years BCE, and the practice continued in some places until the 18th century. The largest known concentration of ancient graves can be found at Mortensnes in Varanger.

== Description ==
In the 1830s, interest arose in the so-called primitive graves, a type of Sami grave in rock shelters, under rocks and large stones. For a long time, these were the most important source of knowledge about the Sami past. These graves occurred in the Iron Age and Middle Ages within a large part of the area with a Sami presence.

Archaeologist Audhild Schanche (1951-) has investigated the ancient graves, which consist of walled-up stones without soil or other loose materials. The bodies are wrapped in fists and lie in an airy space. A special feature is that bones from birds and fish were often included. These graves are found in northern Norway, Trøndelag and Norrland. The burial practice appears to have been in use up to the 18th century. Common to all such graves is that they are located in rocky landscapes where no one lived. Sacrificial sites and bear graves were also established in such places. The first graves of this type were found in Varanger, and the practice spread over a large area throughout the Viking Age and the Early Middle Ages .

At the same time as the Sami sacrificial sites became important, burial rituals changed during the Viking Age. There seems to be a stricter practice regarding what and how much can be placed in the graves. Schanche explains the changes as a sign of both social and religious changes in society. In the Early Iron Age, death and hunting cults were manifested in a gender-neutral way in burial customs. In contrast, the hunting cult was reserved for men in the Viking Age, while the symbols of hunting, such as iron arrows, were not placed in the graves. On the other hand, imported jewelry was placed in women's graves during this period. Schanche interprets this as hunting becoming more important and strengthening the men's role in society, while the women rather receive magical objects. However, the status of women in society may not have been lowered, but rather strengthened. One argument for a stronger position is that women's graves became more richly equipped.

Among the South Sami, it seems that the custom of primordial graves was taken up in the late Middle Ages. At that time, the practice was about to end along the northern coast, where the Sami then switched to Christian burial customs. Schanche explains this by saying that the Sami along the coast were the earliest to be affected by missionary work and the transition to Christianity.
