= Reinøya =

Reinøya may refer to:

- Reinøya, Troms – an island in the Karlsøy municipality in Troms
- Reinøya, Vardø – an island in the Vardø municipality in Finnmark
- Reinøya, Porsanger – an island in the Porsanger municipality in Finnmark
- Reinøya, Sør-Varanger – an island in the Sør-Varanger municipality in Finnmark
- Reinøya, Måsøy – an island in the Måsøy municipality in Finnmark
