= Hornøya (Finnmark) =

Island in Finnmark, Norway

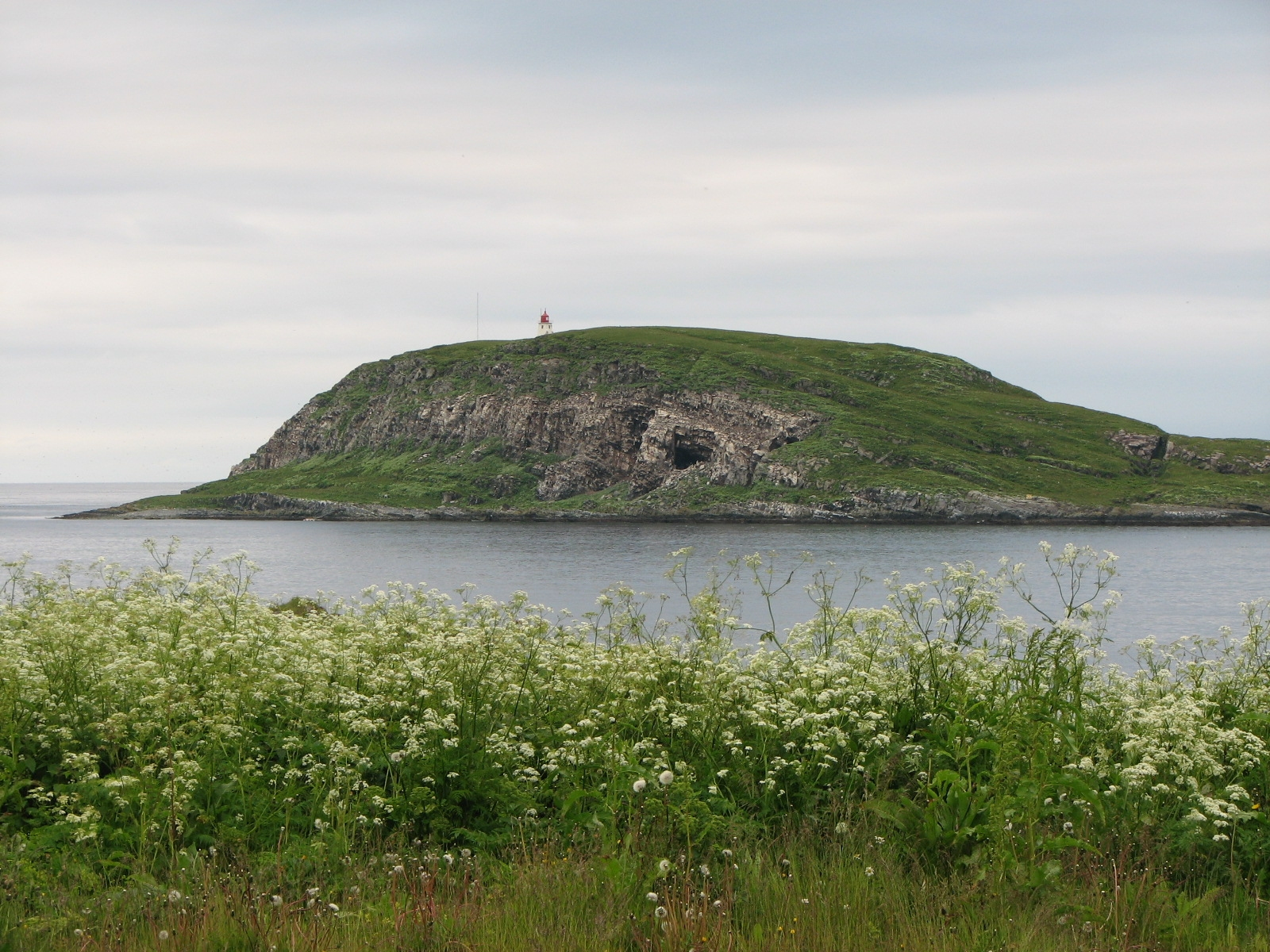
- View of Hornøya and Vardø Lighthouse
- Interactive map of Hornøya

Geography
- Location: Finnmark, Norway
- Coordinates: 70.3877°N 31.1553°E
- Area: 0.4 km^{2} (0.15 sq mi)
- Length: 0.9 km (0.56 mi)
- Width: 0.7 km (0.43 mi)
- Highest elevation: 65 m (213 ft)

Administration
- Norway
- County: Finnmark
- Municipality: Vardø Municipality

Hornøya is a small, 0.4 square kilometres (99 acres), uninhabited island in Vardø Municipality in Finnmark county, Norway. It lies in the Barents Sea, just east of the larger island of Vardøya where the town of Vardø is located. Vardø Lighthouse is situated at the highest point of the island, at an elevation of 65 metres (213 ft) above sea level, and it protects the shipping lanes around the town of Vardø. The island is the easternmost point of Norway proper.

== Important Bird Area ==
The island is included in the Varangerfjord Important Bird Area (IBA), designated as such by BirdLife International for its support of large numbers of waterbirds, seabirds and waders, either breeding or overwintering.

== See also ==
- Extreme points of Norway
