= Reinøya, Vardø =

Island in Norway

Coordinates: 70°23′32″N 31°08′00″E

Reinøya
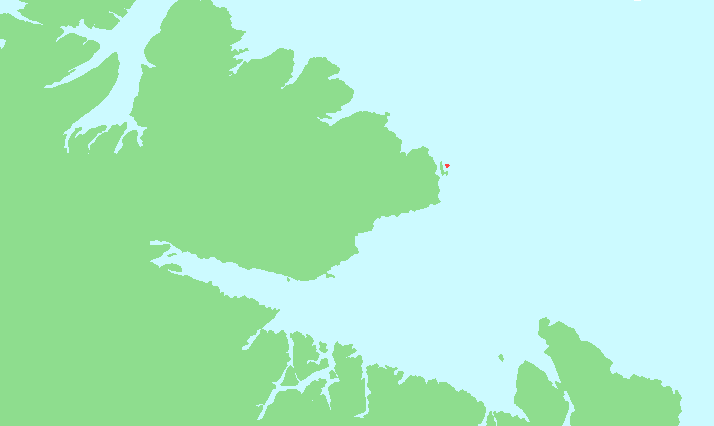
- Location in Finnmark

- Location within Norway

Geography
- Location: Finnmark, Norway
- Area: 1.15 km^{2} (0.44 sq mi)
- Highest elevation: 61 m (200 ft)

Administration
- Norway
- County: Finnmark
- Municipality: Vardø Municipality

Reinøya is an island in Vardø Municipality in Finnmark county, Norway. It is located west of the island of Hornøya. Reinøya has a rich birdlife.

== Important Bird Area ==
The island is included in the Varangerfjord Important Bird Area (IBA), designated as such by BirdLife International for its support of large numbers of waterbirds, seabirds and waders, either breeding or overwintering.
