= GLOBUS =

Radar system in Norway

- Vardø in Norway
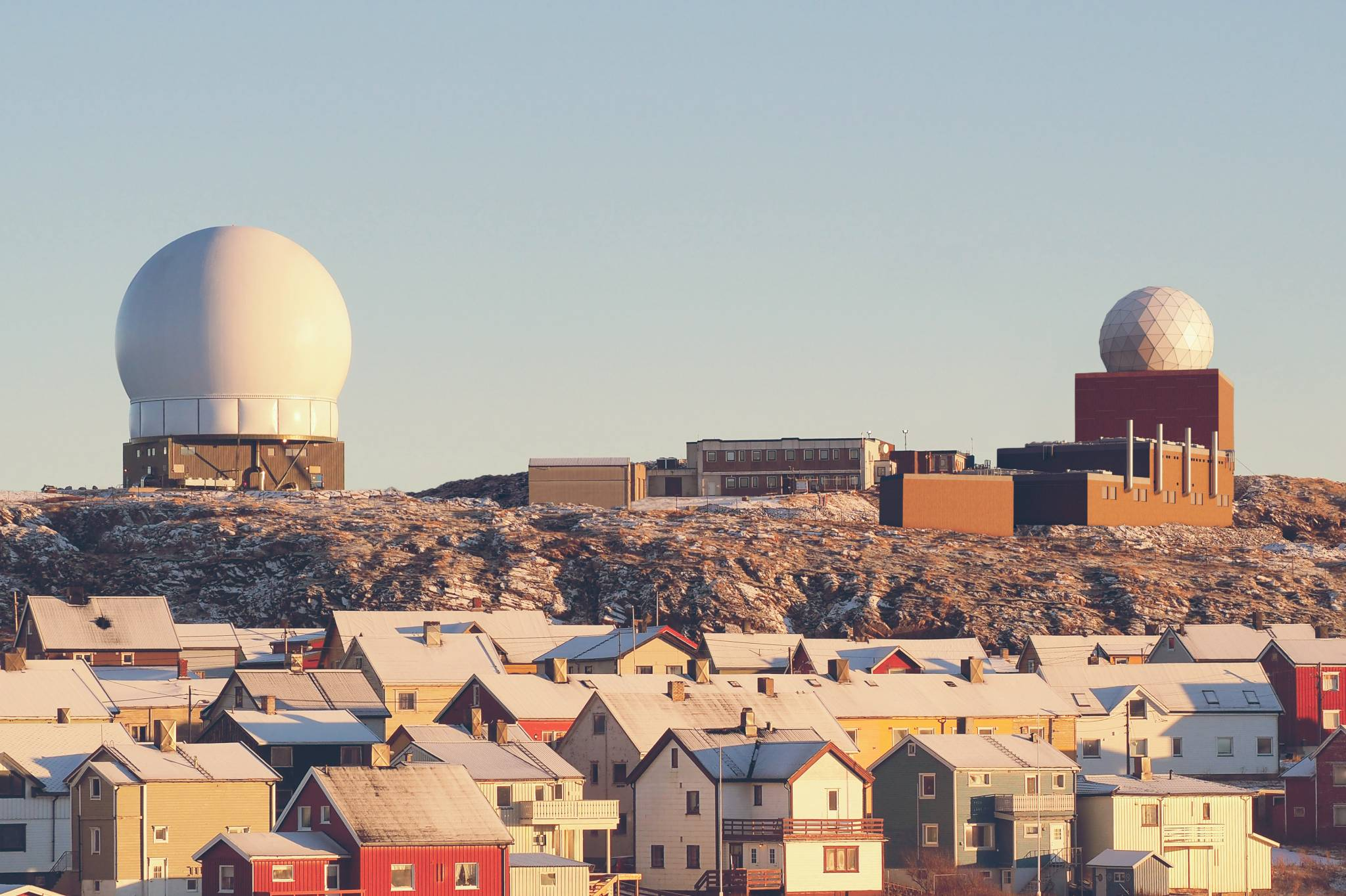
- GLOBUS station above Vardø, with Globus II at left and Globus III at right

Site information
- Type: Radar station
- Owner: Norwegian Intelligence Service
- Website: https://www.etterretningstjenesten.no/aktuelt/aktuelt/oppgradering-av-globus-systemet?q=Globus

Location
- Coordinates: 70.3671°N 31.1278°E

Site history
- In use: 1988–present

GLOBUS is a radar system in the town of Vardø in Vardø Municipality, Finnmark county, Norway. It is operated by the Norwegian Intelligence Service (NIS) and its official uses are primarily space observation and Arctic airspace monitoring for Norway's national interest, though the site's close proximity to known Russian naval bases as well as U.S. involvement in construction and funding have fueled suspicions that it also serves as part of an American missile defense system.

== History ==
=== Cold War and Globus I ===
Norway and the United States, both founding members of the newly-formed NATO, began cooperation on the GLOBUS project during the Cold War era of the 1950s. By 1988, the Globus I radar array was built and operational in the town of Vardø, just 50 km (31 mi) from the border between Norway and the Soviet Union and within visible range of the Kola Peninsula, which is known to contain high-security Russian naval bases. This came within the same year that the U.S. condemned the deployment of a large Soviet radar array near Krasnoyarsk, claiming that this violated the 1972 Anti-Ballistic Missile Treaty.

=== Globus II ===
Globus II
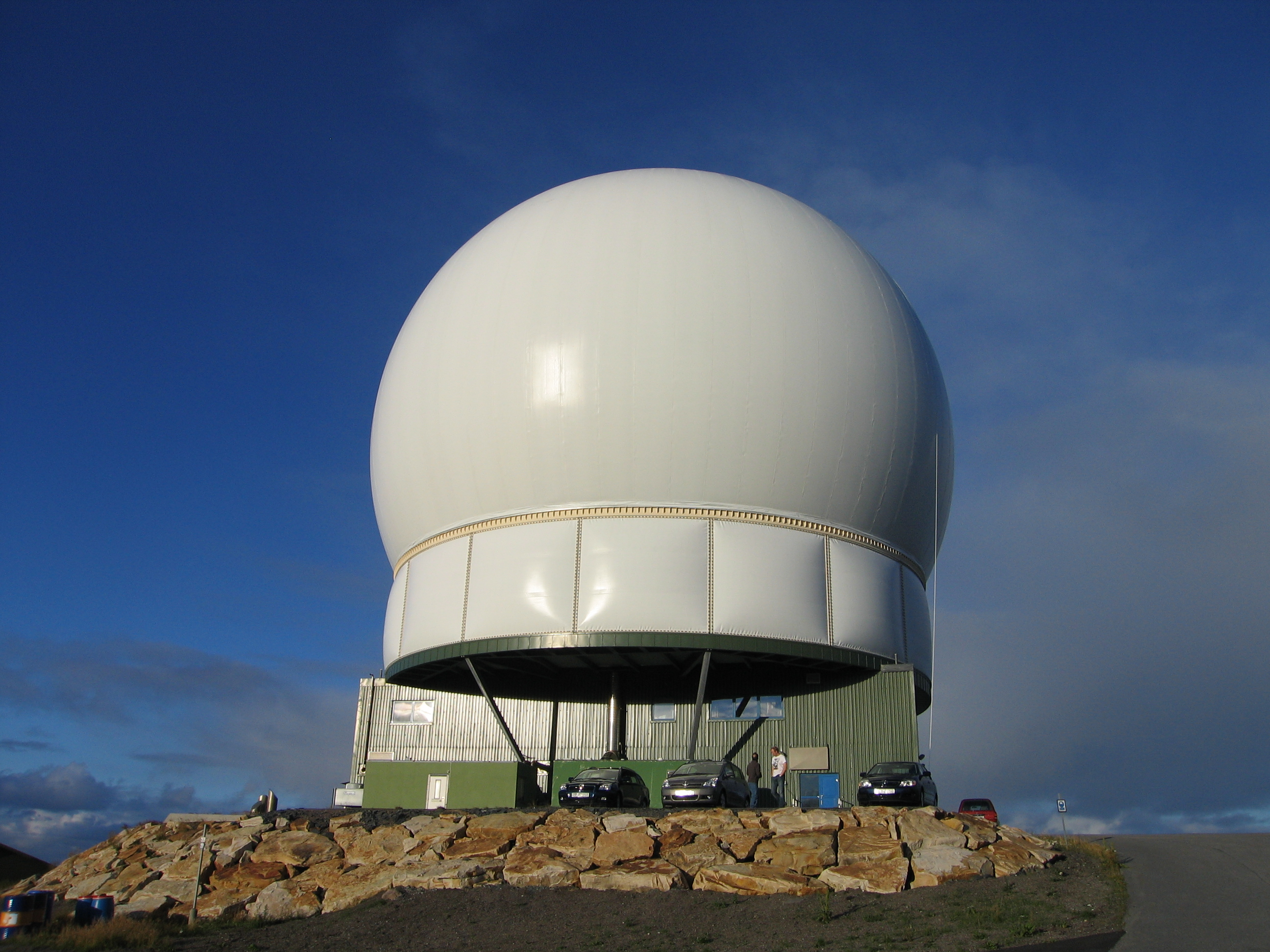
- Globus II in 2009
- Country of origin: U.S. (now in Norway)
- Manufacturer: Raytheon Company
- Introduced: 1995
- Type: Cassegrain feed antenna
- Frequency: X band, 9.5 – 10.5 GHz
- Beamwidth: <0.1°
- Range: 40,000 km (25,000 mi)
- Power: 200 kW
- Other names: HAVE STARE, AN/FPS-129

Originally known as HAVE STARE, the Globus II radar was built by the Raytheon Company at Vandenberg Air Force Base, California and became operational in 1995. It is designated AN/FPS-129 according to the U.S. military's Joint Electronics Type Designation System, as it is the 129th design of an Army-Navy “Fixed, Radar, Search” electronic device. Although the cost of the radar is classified, it is believed to have cost more than US$100 million. In 1999 Raytheon moved the array to Vardø, Norway in fulfillment of a US$23.5 million contract with the U.S. Defense Department and operations resumed under Norwegian control in 2001.

=== Globus III ===
In 2016 construction began on a new array dubbed the Globus III to replace Globus I and work in concert with Globus II. The new radar was estimated to cost US$121 million. On 13 February 2018 it was reported that the local population felt misled about the size of the radar. The construction work was shrouded in secrecy, and many locals were critical, but they were reluctant to speak out because the project brought sorely needed employment to the community. Testing was set to begin in autumn of 2018 with an expected operational date of 2022.

== Purpose and controversy ==
The site is administrated by NIS and operated by Norwegian personnel only. Their website officially states that the radar is used to:

- Monitor, track and categorize objects in space
- Monitor our national area of interest in the north
- Carry out collection of data for national use in research and development

The installation is included as a dedicated sensor in the world-wide United States Space Surveillance Network for tracking objects orbiting Earth. Raytheon, the company that built Globus II, previously described it on their website as a radar "originally designed to collect intelligence data against ballistic missiles". The website has since been removed by request of the US DoD.

In April 1998, a Norwegian journalist, Inge Sellevåg, from the daily newspaper Bergens Tidende discovered that NASA had no knowledge of a new radar being added to the system, despite the Globus II nearing operational condition. This led her to suspect it had other purposes, and Sellevåg discovered that it was also going to be used for national purposes such as intelligence gathering.

In 2000, during a storm, the radome was torn off and uncovered the Globus II radar dish. At that time it was pointing directly towards Russia. A local newspaper editor commented: "I'm not an expert, but I thought space was in the sky." Official comments claimed that the radar was still being tested and that it being pointed towards Russia was a pure coincidence. NIS official Tom Rykkin stated "if you use a small part of the brain, you know this also has an intelligence mission. ... In the intelligence business, there are certain things you don't make public. It is the nature of the business." The Russian Defense Ministry raised complaints that the radar installation violates the Anti-Ballistic Missile Treaty and were supported in this claim by missile defense expert Theodore Postol of the Massachusetts Institute of Technology.

In March 2017, nine Russian bombers took off from Russia's nearby Kola Peninsula and executed a mock air strike against the radar station, flying in attack formation and turning back just before breaching Norwegian airspace. Then in February of the following year, a very similar mock strike was carried out by eleven Russian fighter jets. Regarding the GLOBUS system, Russian spokesperson Maria Zakharova stated in 2019 "There is every reason to believe that the radar will monitor precisely the territory of the Russian Federation and will become part of the US missile defense system" and added "It seems obvious to me that military preparations near Russian or any other borders cannot be ignored by our or other countries. We presume that we will take response measures to ensure our own security." Shortly after these statements Russia deployed a Bal missile system to the Sredny Peninsula, just 70 kilometres (43 mi) from Vardø.

== Technical description ==
According to the U.S. Department of Defense in 2022, "The GLOBUS program is a dual band ground-based radar system consisting of an S-band solid state phased array, an X-band dish antenna, an Integrated System Controller (ISC), and a Mission Communications Suite (MCS) hosted at an Outside Continental United States (OCONUS) location. The S-band sensor is mounted on an azimuth-only pedestal, housed in a new facility. The X-band sensor is a large aperture dish mounted on an elevation/azimuth pedestal. Each sensor may operate independently or cooperatively under the control of the ISC."

== See also ==
- List of radars
- List of military electronics of the United States
