= Vardø Municipality =

Municipality in Finnmark, Norway

Vardø Municipality Vardø kommune Várggát (Northern Sami) Vuorea (Kven) Vuoreija (Finnish)
- Municipality
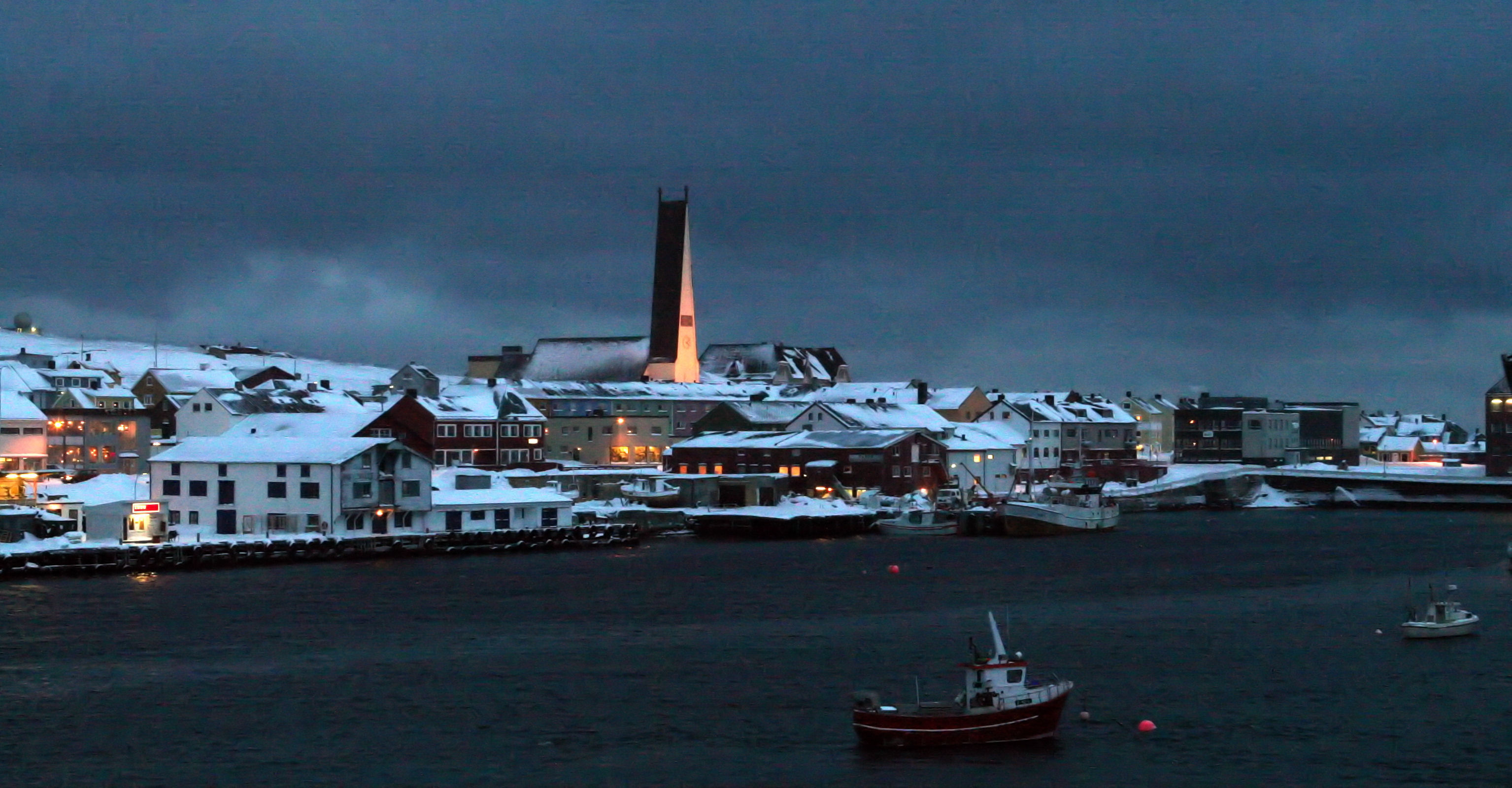
- View of Vardø

- Coat of arms

- Finnmark within Norway

- Vardø within Finnmark
- Coordinates: 70°22′14″N 31°01′27″E
- Country: Norway
- County: Finnmark
- District: Øst-Finnmark
- Established: 1 Jan 1838
- Administrative centre: Vardø

Government
  - Mayor (2023): Tor Erik Labahå (Sp)

Area
  - Total: 600.85 km^{2} (231.99 sq mi)
  - Land: 585.02 km^{2} (225.88 sq mi)
  - Water: 15.83 km^{2} (6.11 sq mi) 2.6%
  - Rank: #188 in Norway
- Highest elevation: 492.4 m (1,615 ft)

Population (2024)
  - Total: 1,972
  - Rank: #284 in Norway
  - Density: 3.3/km^{2} (8.5/sq mi)
  - Change (10 years): ▼ −6.9%
- Demonym: Vardøværing

Official language
  - Norwegian form: Bokmål
- Time zone: UTC+01:00 (CET)
  - Summer (DST): UTC+02:00 (CEST)
- ISO 3166 code: NO-5634
- Website: Official website

Vardø (Norwegian pronunciation: [vaɖːø]; Finnish: Vuoreija; Kven: Vuorea; Northern Sami: Várggát) is a municipality in Finnmark county in the extreme northeastern part of Norway. Vardø is the easternmost town in Norway, more to the east than Saint Petersburg or Istanbul. The administrative centre of the municipality is the town of Vardø. Two of the larger villages in the municipality are Kiberg and Svartnes.

The 601-square-kilometre (232 sq mi) municipality is the 188th largest by area out of the 357 municipalities in Norway. Vardø is the 284th most populous municipality in Norway with a population of 1,972. The municipality's population density is 3.3 inhabitants per square kilometre (8.5/sq mi) and its population has decreased by 6.9% over the previous 10-year period.

== General information ==
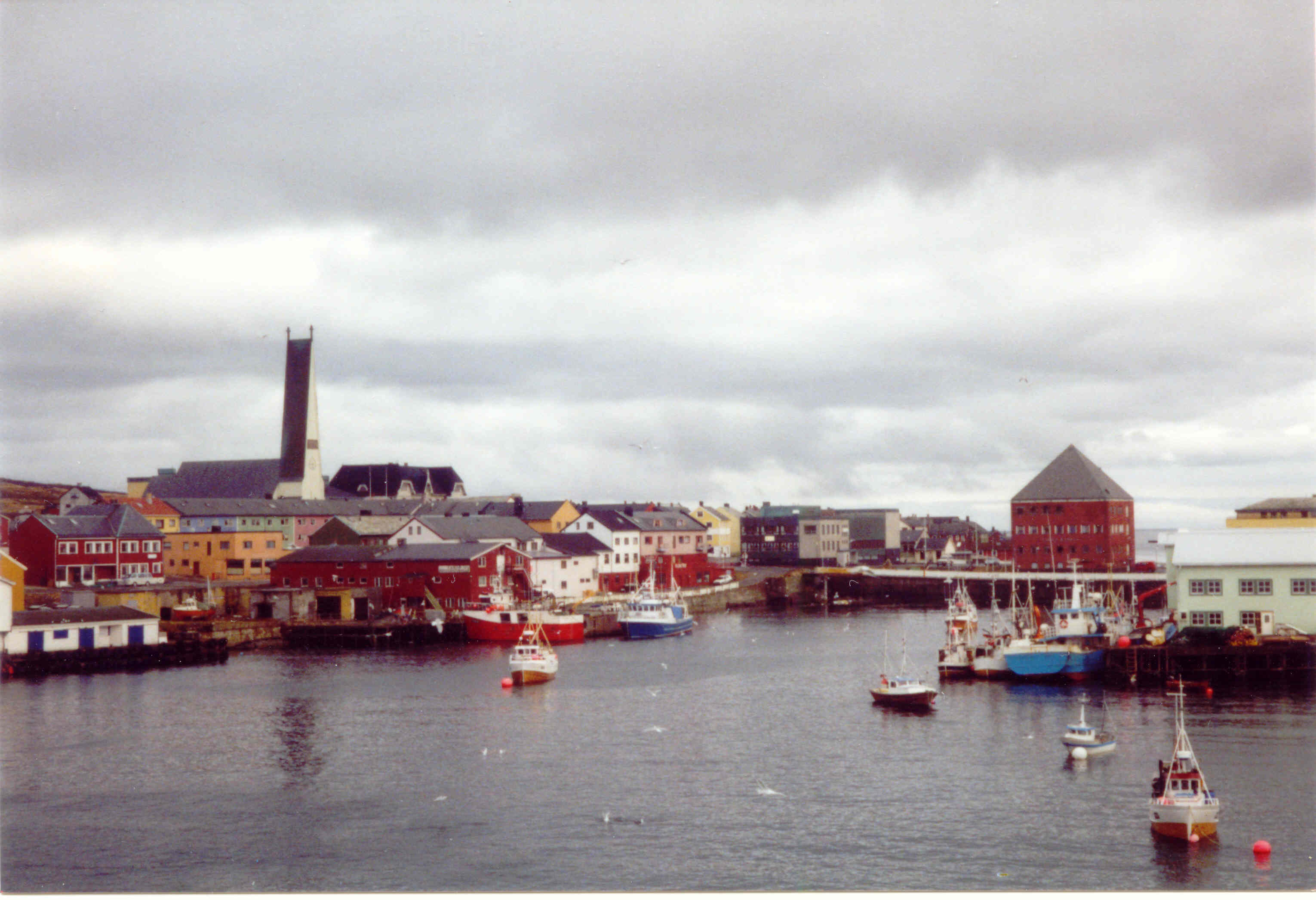
Vardø April 2001

The town of Vardø and the rural district around it was established as a municipality on 1 January 1838 (see formannskapsdistrikt law). The law required that all towns be separated from their rural districts, but because of a low population and very few voters, this was impossible to carry out for Vardø in 1838. (This also happened to the nearby towns of Hammerfest and Vadsø.) The rural district of Vardø (Vardø landdistrikt, which was renamed Båtsfjord Municipality in 1957) was officially separated from the town of Vardø in 1868. During the 1960s, there were many municipal mergers across Norway due to the work of the Schei Committee. On 1 January 1964, the eastern part of Båtsfjord merged with the town of Vardø to create Vardø Municipality.

On 1 January 2020, the municipality became part of the newly formed Troms og Finnmark county. Previously, it had been part of the old Finnmark county. On 1 January 2024, the Troms og Finnmark county was divided and the municipality once again became part of Finnmark county.

=== Name ===
The Old Norse form of the name was Vargøy. The first element is vargr which means "wolf" and the last element is øy which means "island". The first element was later replaced (around 1500) with varða which means "cairn". Historically, the name was spelled Vardöe.

=== Coat of arms ===
The coat of arms dates to 1898. Its borders are drawn using the national colours: red, white, and blue. The border frames the shield, and the centre field shows a complex scene incorporating a sunrise with rays, two fishing boats with crews, the sea with waves, and a large cod. In the chief is the year of the town's foundation, 1789, together with the words "Vardöensis Insignia Urbis", meaning "the seal of the town of Vardø". In the lower part of the arms is the town motto: "Cedant Tenebræ Soli", meaning "Darkness shall give way to the sun." This is a high resolution version of the coat of arms.

=== Churches ===
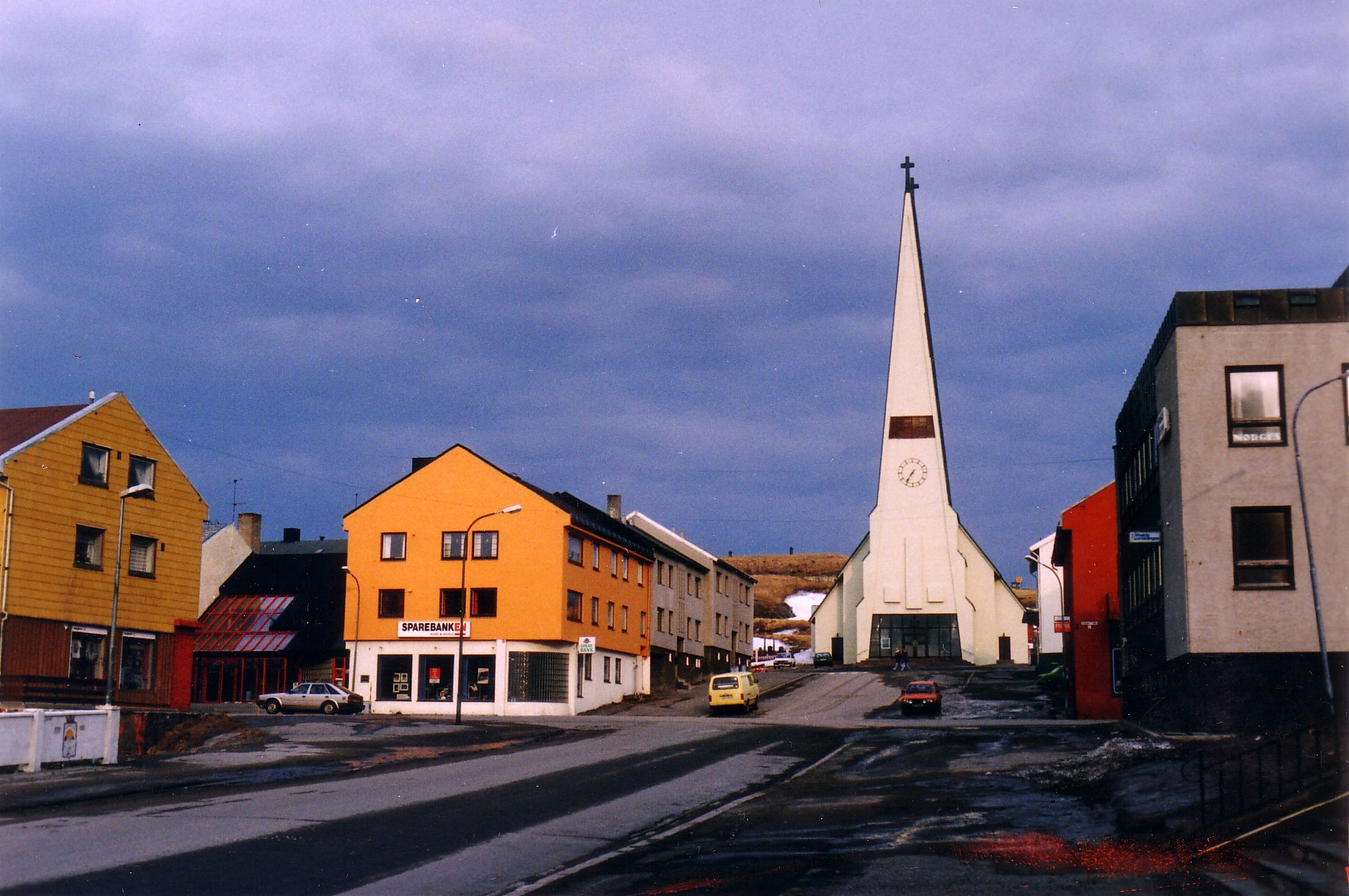
The Kirkegata Street in Vardø with the church

The Church of Norway has one parish (sokn) within Vardø Municipality. It is part of the Varanger prosti (deanery) in the Diocese of Nord-Hålogaland.

Churches in Vardø Municipality
Parish (sokn)	Church name	Location of the church	Year built
Vardø	Vardø Church	Vardø	1958
Vardø	Vardø Chapel	Vardø	1908

== History ==
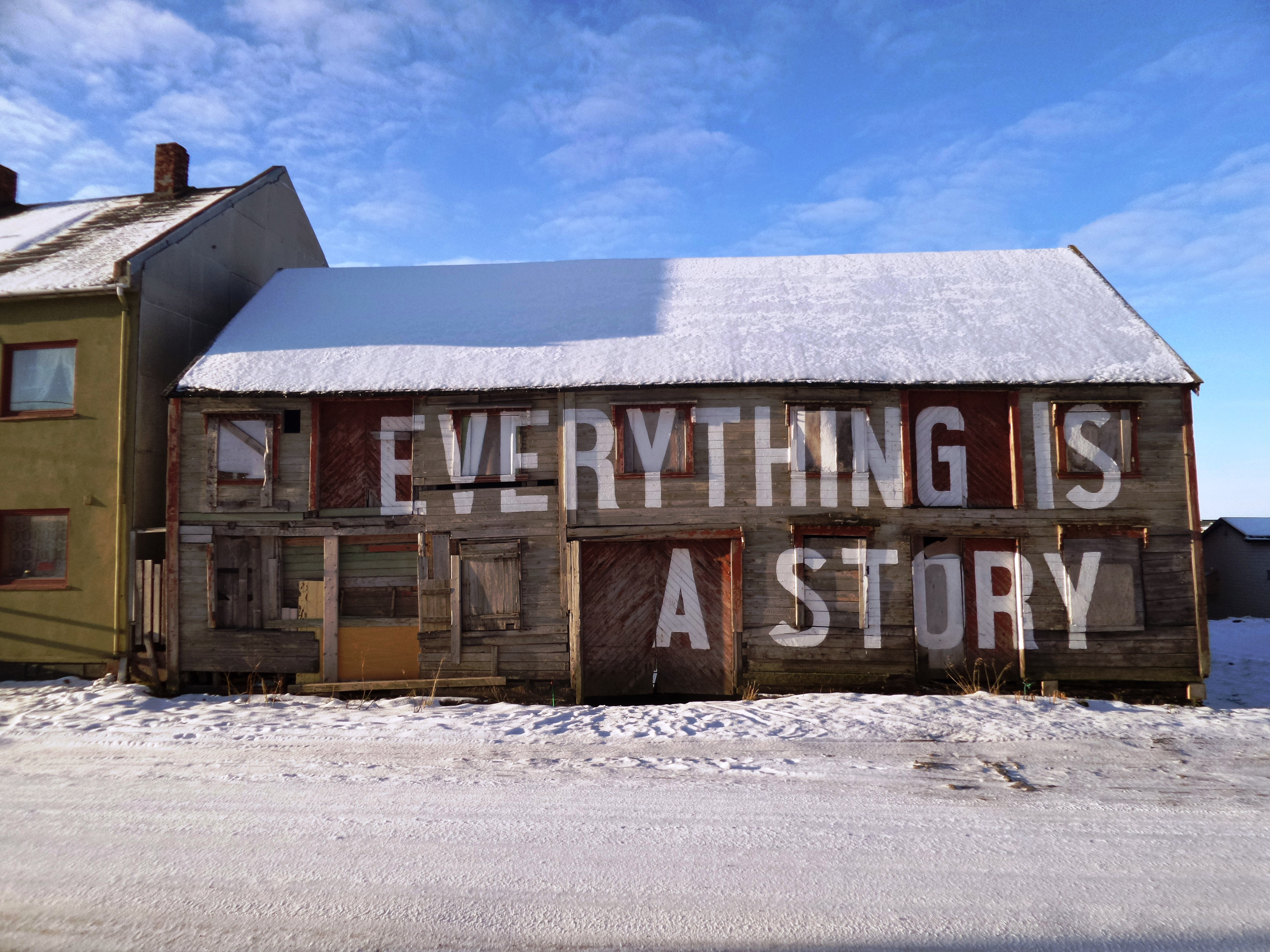
Street art in the old town

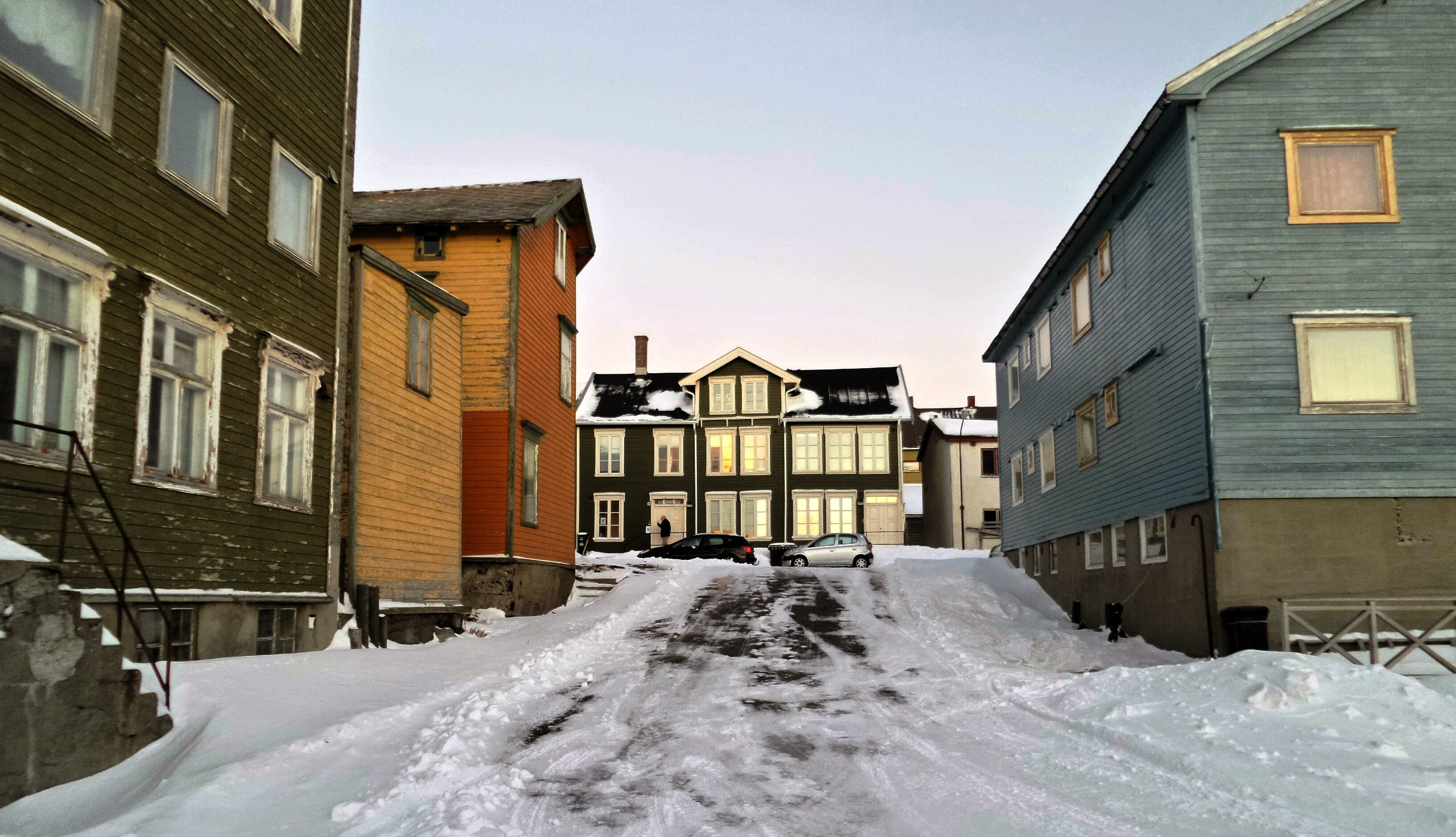
Old houses in Østervågen

Vardø has a long settlement history before it was granted status as a town in 1789. Several stone-age sites as well as sites dating from the Sami Iron Age are known on the island. In the Medieval period, Vardø's importance grew as a result of it being the easternmost stronghold of the then-expanding Norwegian royal power. A church was built in Vardø in 1307, and the first fortress was established at about the same time. Thick cultural layers in the southeastern part of the town, Østervågen, document continuous habitation in this area reaching back at least some 800 years.

Even if the presence of the fortress and king's bailiff gave Vardø a certain degree of permanence and stability not experienced by other fishing communities in Finnmark, the town's size and importance waxed and waned with the changing fortunes of the fisheries. In the mid-16th century Vardø had a population of 400 to 500 people. By 1789, however, it had reduced to about 100.

In the 17th century, Vardø was the center of a great number of witchcraft trials. More than 90 persons, Norwegian and Sami, were given death sentences. They are commemorated in the Steilneset Memorial.

In 1769, the Hungarian astronomer Maximilian Hell and his assistant János Sajnovics, delegated by Christian VII of Denmark, traveled to Vardø to observe the Transit of Venus.

After 1850, the town saw a marked expansion. The fisheries grew in importance, and so did the Pomor trade with Russia's White Sea region. In 1850 the population reached 400, and in 1910 it passed 3 000.

During World War II, with Norway occupied by the German Wehrmacht, Vardø was heavily bombed by Allied, mostly Russian forces. Most of the town center was destroyed, and the population was evacuated. After the war, the city center was completely reconstructed, but older, traditional houses survived in the periphery, such as in the old town in Østervågen.

As of 2017, the fishing industry had collapsed. From 1995 to 2017, the population shrank by 50 percent to 2,100 people. In May 2017 work to lay a new electric cable from the Norwegian mainland to the island began. The additional electricity is needed to power the American-funded GLOBUS space surveillance system, located about 40 miles from Russia's Kola Peninsula, a territory studded with high-security naval bases and restricted military zones. The secrecy surrounding the radar systems has spawned fears that officials are covering up health hazards and other possible dangers. The electromagnetic pulses the current radar system emits interfere with television and radio reception, and some residents have blamed them for a rash of miscarriages and cancer cases in a civilian district next to the fenced-in security zone.

The town was selected as the millennium site for Finnmark county.

== Government ==
Vardø Municipality is responsible for primary education (through 10th grade), outpatient health services, senior citizen services, welfare and other social services, zoning, economic development, and municipal roads and utilities. The municipality is governed by a municipal council of directly elected representatives. The mayor is indirectly elected by a vote of the municipal council. The municipality is under the jurisdiction of the Indre og Østre Finnmark District Court and the Hålogaland Court of Appeal.

=== Municipal council ===
The municipal council (Kommunestyre) of Vardø Municipality is made up of 19 representatives elected to four-year terms. The tables below show the current and historical composition of the council by political party.

Vardø kommunestyre 2023–2027
Party name (in Norwegian)	Number of representatives
Labour Party (Arbeiderpartiet)	9
Green Party (Miljøpartiet De Grønne)	5
Conservative Party (Høyre)	2
Centre Party (Senterpartiet)	2
Socialist Left Party (Sosialistisk Venstreparti)	1
Total number of members:	19

Vardø kommunestyre 2019–2023
Party name (in Norwegian)	Number of representatives
Labour Party (Arbeiderpartiet)	8
Green Party (Miljøpartiet De Grønne)	5
Conservative Party (Høyre)	1
Centre Party (Senterpartiet)	4
Socialist Left Party (Sosialistisk Venstreparti)	1
Total number of members:	19

Vardø kommunestyre 2015–2019
Party name (in Norwegian)	Number of representatives
Labour Party (Arbeiderpartiet)	10
Progress Party (Fremskrittspartiet)	1
Green Party (Miljøpartiet De Grønne)	3
Conservative Party (Høyre)	2
Coastal Party (Kystpartiet)	1
Liberal Party (Venstre)	2
Total number of members:	19

Vardø kommunestyre 2011–2015
Party name (in Norwegian)	Number of representatives
Labour Party (Arbeiderpartiet)	8
Progress Party (Fremskrittspartiet)	4
Conservative Party (Høyre)	2
Coastal Party (Kystpartiet)	2
Socialist Left Party (Sosialistisk Venstreparti)	1
Liberal Party (Venstre)	2
Total number of members:	19

Vardø kommunestyre 2007–2011
Party name (in Norwegian)	Number of representatives
Labour Party (Arbeiderpartiet)	9
Progress Party (Fremskrittspartiet)	2
Conservative Party (Høyre)	1
Coastal Party (Kystpartiet)	2
Socialist Left Party (Sosialistisk Venstreparti)	1
Liberal Party (Venstre)	1
Vardø List (Vardølista)	3
Total number of members:	19

Vardø kommunestyre 2003–2007
Party name (in Norwegian)	Number of representatives
Labour Party (Arbeiderpartiet)	13
Progress Party (Fremskrittspartiet)	1
Conservative Party (Høyre)	2
Socialist Left Party (Sosialistisk Venstreparti)	2
Liberal Party (Venstre)	1
Total number of members:	19

Vardø kommunestyre 1999–2003
Party name (in Norwegian)	Number of representatives
Labour Party (Arbeiderpartiet)	11
Progress Party (Fremskrittspartiet)	1
Conservative Party (Høyre)	8
Christian Democratic Party (Kristelig Folkeparti)	1
Socialist Left Party (Sosialistisk Venstreparti)	3
Liberal Party (Venstre)	1
Total number of members:	25

Vardø kommunestyre 1995–1999
Party name (in Norwegian)	Number of representatives
Labour Party (Arbeiderpartiet)	10
Progress Party (Fremskrittspartiet)	2
Conservative Party (Høyre)	6
Christian Democratic Party (Kristelig Folkeparti)	1
Centre Party (Senterpartiet)	3
Socialist Left Party (Sosialistisk Venstreparti)	2
Liberal Party (Venstre)	1
Total number of members:	25

Vardø kommunestyre 1991–1995
Party name (in Norwegian)	Number of representatives
Labour Party (Arbeiderpartiet)	11
Conservative Party (Høyre)	6
Socialist Left Party (Sosialistisk Venstreparti)	5
Liberal Party (Venstre)	3
Total number of members:	25

Vardø kommunestyre 1987–1991
Party name (in Norwegian)	Number of representatives
Labour Party (Arbeiderpartiet)	16
Conservative Party (Høyre)	6
Communist Party (Kommunistiske Parti)	1
Socialist Left Party (Sosialistisk Venstreparti)	4
Liberal Party (Venstre)	2
Total number of members:	29

Vardø kommunestyre 1983–1987
Party name (in Norwegian)	Number of representatives
Labour Party (Arbeiderpartiet)	19
Conservative Party (Høyre)	4
Communist Party (Kommunistiske Parti)	1
Socialist Left Party (Sosialistisk Venstreparti)	3
Liberal Party (Venstre)	2
Total number of members:	29

Vardø kommunestyre 1979–1983
Party name (in Norwegian)	Number of representatives
Labour Party (Arbeiderpartiet)	16
Conservative Party (Høyre)	6
Christian Democratic Party (Kristelig Folkeparti)	1
Socialist Left Party (Sosialistisk Venstreparti)	3
Liberal Party (Venstre)	3
Total number of members:	29

Vardø kommunestyre 1975–1979
Party name (in Norwegian)	Number of representatives
Labour Party (Arbeiderpartiet)	16
Conservative Party (Høyre)	4
Christian Democratic Party (Kristelig Folkeparti)	2
Socialist Left Party (Sosialistisk Venstreparti)	4
Liberal Party (Venstre)	3
Total number of members:	29

Vardø kommunestyre 1971–1975
Party name (in Norwegian)	Number of representatives
Labour Party (Arbeiderpartiet)	15
Conservative Party (Høyre)	4
Liberal Party (Venstre)	3
Local List(s) (Lokale lister)	1
Socialist common list (Venstresosialistiske felleslister)	6
Total number of members:	29

Vardø kommunestyre 1967–1971
Party name (in Norwegian)	Number of representatives
Labour Party (Arbeiderpartiet)	14
Conservative Party (Høyre)	4
Communist Party (Kommunistiske Parti)	3
Socialist People's Party (Sosialistisk Folkeparti)	4
Liberal Party (Venstre)	4
Total number of members:	29

Vardø kommunestyre 1963–1967
Party name (in Norwegian)	Number of representatives
Labour Party (Arbeiderpartiet)	15
Conservative Party (Høyre)	5
Communist Party (Kommunistiske Parti)	4
Liberal Party (Venstre)	5
Total number of members:	29

Vardø bystyre 1959–1963
Party name (in Norwegian)	Number of representatives
Labour Party (Arbeiderpartiet)	14
Conservative Party (Høyre)	5
Communist Party (Kommunistiske Parti)	5
Liberal Party (Venstre)	5
Total number of members:	29

Vardø bystyre 1955–1959
Party name (in Norwegian)	Number of representatives
Labour Party (Arbeiderpartiet)	17
Conservative Party (Høyre)	3
Communist Party (Kommunistiske Parti)	5
Liberal Party (Venstre)	4
Total number of members:	29

Vardø bystyre 1951–1955
Party name (in Norwegian)	Number of representatives
Labour Party (Arbeiderpartiet)	15
Conservative Party (Høyre)	3
Communist Party (Kommunistiske Parti)	6
Liberal Party (Venstre)	4
Total number of members:	28

Vardø bystyre 1947–1951
Party name (in Norwegian)	Number of representatives
Labour Party (Arbeiderpartiet)	13
Conservative Party (Høyre)	2
Communist Party (Kommunistiske Parti)	5
Liberal Party (Venstre)	5
Local List(s) (Lokale lister)	3
Total number of members:	28

Vardø bystyre 1945–1947
Party name (in Norwegian)	Number of representatives
Labour Party (Arbeiderpartiet)	16
Conservative Party (Høyre)	3
Communist Party (Kommunistiske Parti)	6
Liberal Party (Venstre)	3
Total number of members:	28

Vardø bystyre 1937–1941*
Party name (in Norwegian)	Number of representatives
Labour Party (Arbeiderpartiet)	14
Communist Party (Kommunistiske Parti)	3
Liberal Party (Venstre)	5
Joint list of the Conservative Party (Høyre) and the Free-minded People's Party (Frisinnede Folkeparti)	6
Total number of members:	28
Note: Due to the German occupation of Norway during World War II, no elections were held for new municipal councils until after the war ended in 1945.

Vardø bystyre 1934–1937
Party name (in Norwegian)	Number of representatives
Labour Party (Arbeiderpartiet)	15
Conservative Party (Høyre)	6
Communist Party (Kommunistiske Parti)	2
Liberal Party (Venstre)	5
Total number of members:	28

Vardø bystyre 1931–1934
Party name (in Norwegian)	Number of representatives
Labour Party (Arbeiderpartiet)	11
Communist Party (Kommunistiske Parti)	1
Liberal Party (Venstre)	6
Joint list of the Conservative Party (Høyre) and the Free-minded People's Party (Frisinnede Folkeparti)	8
Local List(s) (Lokale lister)	2
Total number of members:	28

Vardø bystyre 1928–1931
Party name (in Norwegian)	Number of representatives
Labour Party (Arbeiderpartiet)	14
Communist Party (Kommunistiske Parti)	1
Liberal Party (Venstre)	5
Joint list of the Conservative Party (Høyre) and the Free-minded Liberal Party (Frisinnede Venstre)	8
Total number of members:	28

Vardø bystyre 1925–1928
Party name (in Norwegian)	Number of representatives
Labour Party (Arbeiderpartiet)	11
Liberal Party (Venstre)	4
Joint List(s) of Non-Socialist Parties (Borgerlige Felleslister)	8
Local List(s) (Lokale lister)	3
Workers' common list (Arbeidernes fellesliste)	2
Total number of members:	28

Vardø bystyre 1922–1925
Party name (in Norwegian)	Number of representatives
Labour Party (Arbeiderpartiet)	11
Liberal Party (Venstre)	2
Joint list of the Conservative Party (Høyre) and the Free-minded Liberal Party (Frisinnede Venstre)	9
Local List(s) (Lokale lister)	6
Total number of members:	28

Vardø bystyre 1919–1922
Party name (in Norwegian)	Number of representatives
Labour Party (Arbeiderpartiet)	12
Joint List(s) of Non-Socialist Parties (Borgerlige Felleslister)	16
Total number of members:	28

=== Mayors ===
The mayor (Norwegian: ordfører) of Vardø Municipality is the political leader of the municipality and the chairperson of the municipal council. Here is a list of people who have held this position:

- 1838–1840: Andreas Esbensen Brodtkorb
- 1841–1848: Paul Holst Conradi
- 1849–1850: Søren Engelhardt Schultze
- 1851–1854: Johan Daniel Stub Landmark
- 1855–1858: Christian Fredrik Wilhelm Scharffenberg
- 1859–1860: Thorvald Eid
- 1861–1866: Anton Johan Holmboe
- 1867–1871: Johan Carl Richard Wisløff
- 1871–1872: Arnt Nikolai Brodtkorb
- 1873–1873: Severin Carl Magnus Thornæs
- 1874–1875: Thorvald Andreas Kyhn
- 1876–1879: Lauritz Evje
- 1880–1880: Karsten Andreas Zachariassen
- 1881–1887: Lauritz Leganger Uchermann
- 1888–1888: Nikolai Christian Grove Prebensen (H)
- 1889–1891: Søren I. Meyer
- 1892–1896: Ivar Andreas Nordang
- 1897–1897: Martin Olsen
- 1898–1898: Kristian Dahl
- 1899–1901: Martin Olsen
- 1902–1904: Henning Laurits Brodtkorb
- 1905–1907: Olav Martin Olsen
- 1908–1913: Sivert Magnus Gundersen
- 1914–1916: Karl Marenius Ivarsson
- 1917–1917: Sivert Magnus Gundersen
- 1917–1918: Hans Hansen Sætrum
- 1918–1919: Ingebrikt Nygaard
- 1920–1922: Iver Albert Olsen Grøttum
- 1923–1925: Henning Laurits Brodtkorb
- 1926–1930: Jon Andrå
- 1931–1941: Peder Ragnar Holt
- 1941–1944: Erling Pedersen
- 1944–1945: Richard Bodin
- 1946–1959: Rudolf Olsen
- 1959–1968: Karl Holt
- 1968–1979: Hjalmar Halvorsen
- 1979–1981: Alf Sverre Olsen
- 1982–1991: Tor Andreas Kofoed (Ap)
- 1995–2003: Hermod Larsen (H)
- 2003–2007: Rolf Einar Mortensen (Ap)
- 2007–2015: Lasse Haughom (FrP)
- 2015–2019: Robert Jensen (Ap)
- 2019–2023: Ørjan Jensen (MDG)
- 2023–present: Tor Erik Labahå (Sp)

== Geography ==
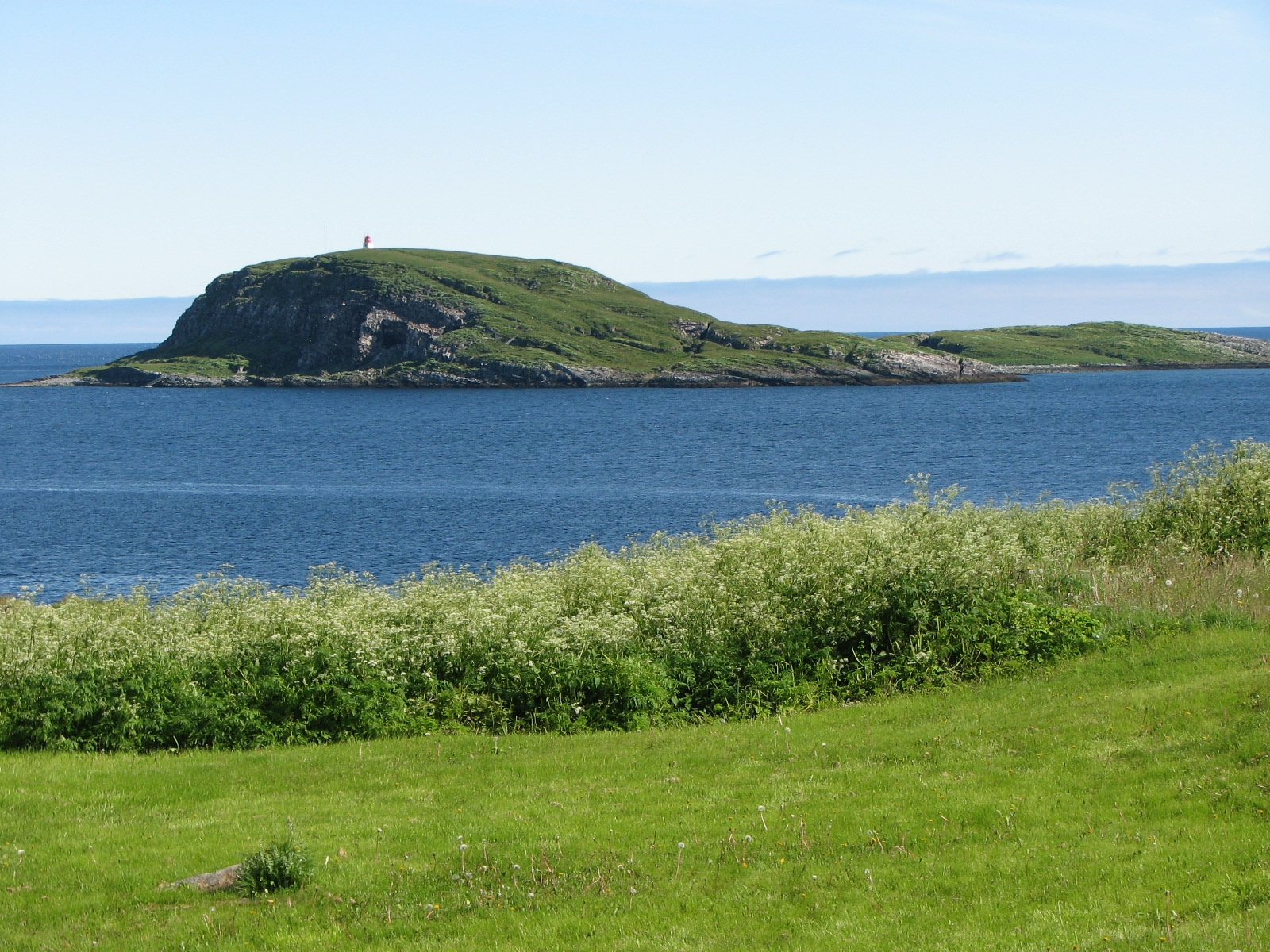
View of Hornøya

Vardø is the easternmost town in Norway and the Nordic countries, located at 31°E, which is east of Saint Petersburg, Kyiv and Istanbul. The eastern part of Finnmark is in the same time zone as the rest of the country, despite daylight shifted by more than an hour. The town is on the island of Vardøya, but the municipality includes significant area on the mainland of the Varanger Peninsula, including part of the Varangerhalvøya National Park in the southwest. The highest point in the municipality is the 492-metre (1,614 ft) tall mountain Grythaugen.

The mountain Domen lies on the shore of the Varanger Peninsula. South of it lies the small Kibergsneset peninsula, where the village of Kiberg is. The town lies on the island of Vardøya, which is surrounded by a few smaller islands. Hornøya is one of them. It is northeast of Vardøya and is the site of Vardø Lighthouse. The mouth of the Varangerfjorden lies along the municipality's eastern coast.

=== Climate ===
Since Vardø in 1830, average annual temperature data recorded by weather stations illustrate the phenomenon of global warming.

The port of Vardø, on the Barents Sea, remains ice-free all year round thanks to the warm North Atlantic drift. Vardø earlier had a tundra climate (Köppen: ET), but as a result of warming, Vardø now has a subarctic climate (Köppen: Dfc) using the official 1991-2020 period, because the monthly mean temperatures in July and August has passed the 10 °C (50 °F) threshold. Excluding high mountain areas, it was earlier the only town in Norway proper (excluding Svalbard and Jan Mayen) with a polar climate. The town is on an unsheltered island in the Barents Sea and treeless. The "midnight sun" is above the horizon from 16 May to 29 July, and the period with continuous daylight lasts a bit longer, polar night from 24 November to 19 January. The average date for first overnight freeze (below 0 °C (32 °F)) in autumn is October 12. The weather station Vardø Radio (10 m) started recording in June 1829.

Climate data for Vardø (10 m, Vardø Radio), 1991–2020 normals, extremes 1829–present
Month	Jan	Feb	Mar	Apr	May	Jun	Jul	Aug	Sep	Oct	Nov	Dec	Year
Record high °C (°F)	7.3 (45.1)	6.9 (44.4)	8.4 (47.1)	13.3 (55.9)	21.1 (70.0)	25.8 (78.4)	27.3 (81.1)	25.1 (77.2)	20.1 (68.2)	13.8 (56.8)	10.4 (50.7)	7.3 (45.1)	27.3 (81.1)
Mean maximum °C (°F)	3.6 (38.5)	3.3 (37.9)	3.6 (38.5)	6.8 (44.2)	12.7 (54.9)	16.8 (62.2)	20.0 (68.0)	19.1 (66.4)	15.2 (59.4)	9.9 (49.8)	5.6 (42.1)	4.8 (40.6)	21.4 (70.5)
Mean daily maximum °C (°F)	−1.2 (29.8)	−1.8 (28.8)	−0.4 (31.3)	2.2 (36.0)	5.8 (42.4)	9.1 (48.4)	12.3 (54.1)	12.3 (54.1)	9.8 (49.6)	5.0 (41.0)	1.7 (35.1)	0.2 (32.4)	4.6 (40.3)
Daily mean °C (°F)	−3.5 (25.7)	−3.9 (25.0)	−2.3 (27.9)	0.3 (32.5)	3.8 (38.8)	7.0 (44.6)	10.0 (50.0)	10.1 (50.2)	7.8 (46.0)	3.3 (37.9)	−0.2 (31.6)	−2.0 (28.4)	2.5 (36.6)
Mean daily minimum °C (°F)	−6.0 (21.2)	−6.5 (20.3)	−4.5 (23.9)	−1.6 (29.1)	1.8 (35.2)	5.0 (41.0)	8.0 (46.4)	8.2 (46.8)	5.9 (42.6)	1.5 (34.7)	−2.2 (28.0)	−4.3 (24.3)	0.4 (32.8)
Mean minimum °C (°F)	−12.8 (9.0)	−12.8 (9.0)	−9.8 (14.4)	−7.2 (19.0)	−2.3 (27.9)	1.7 (35.1)	5.3 (41.5)	4.5 (40.1)	1.8 (35.2)	−4.2 (24.4)	−7.9 (17.8)	−10.3 (13.5)	−14.5 (5.9)
Record low °C (°F)	−22.5 (−8.5)	−22.7 (−8.9)	−20.5 (−4.9)	−14.4 (6.1)	−10.3 (13.5)	−3.9 (25.0)	−1.6 (29.1)	−0.4 (31.3)	−4.8 (23.4)	−13.2 (8.2)	−15.0 (5.0)	−20.1 (−4.2)	−22.7 (−8.9)
Average precipitation mm (inches)	59.1 (2.33)	50.6 (1.99)	51.8 (2.04)	40.3 (1.59)	35.6 (1.40)	46.0 (1.81)	55.0 (2.17)	55.2 (2.17)	46.6 (1.83)	70.9 (2.79)	52.8 (2.08)	60.0 (2.36)	623.9 (24.56)
Average extreme snow depth cm (inches)	62 (24)	83 (33)	98 (39)	97 (38)	59 (23)	10 (3.9)	0 (0)	0 (0)	1 (0.4)	8 (3.1)	21 (8.3)	42 (17)	110 (43)
Average precipitation days	16	13	13	11	9	8	9	9	10	16	13	14	141
Average relative humidity (%)	85	85	82	81	82	84	87	86	84	83	84	84	84
Average dew point °C (°F)	−6.3 (20.7)	−6.6 (20.1)	−5.4 (22.3)	−2.6 (27.3)	0.5 (32.9)	3.9 (39.0)	7.7 (45.9)	7.4 (45.3)	5.7 (42.3)	0.9 (33.6)	−2.2 (28.0)	−3.9 (25.0)	−0.1 (31.8)
Source 1: Norwegian Meteorological Institute (dew point and humidity 1991-2020, extreme snow depth 1897-1950 and extremes)
Source 2: NOAA WMO averages 91-2020 Norway

=== Fauna and flora ===
The municipality of Vardø with its seabird colonies of Hornøya and Reinøya are among the most interesting on this part of the coast. There is a small breeding population of Brunnich's guillemot as well as larger numbers of razorbill and common guillemot.

The climate is too cold in summer and too windy in winter for trees, but a few planted trees exist in wind-sheltered locations, generally rowans.

== Transportation ==
The island is connected to the mainland via the undersea Vardø Tunnel which was Norway's first such structure. Vardø Airport and the settlement of Svartnes are on the mainland opposite the tunnel entrance. Vardø is a port of call on Norway's Hurtigruten ferry service. The town is the northern termination of European route E75, which starts in Sitia, Crete.

== Media ==
The newspaper Østhavet has been published in Vardø since 1997.

== Economy and tourism ==
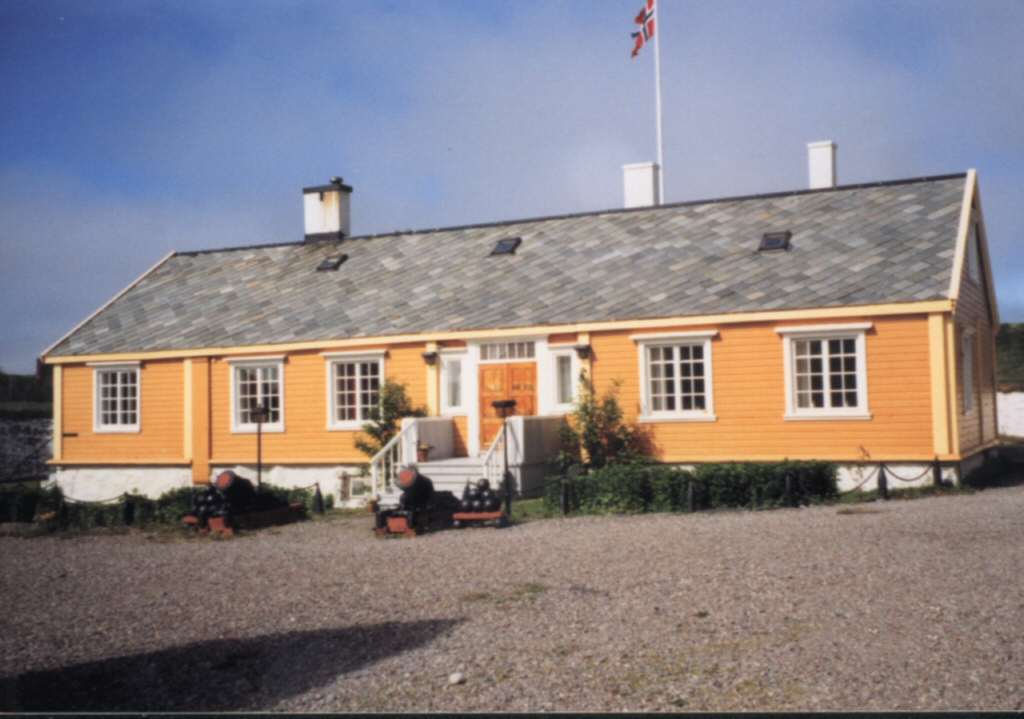
Officers' quarters at Vardøhus Festning. The sorbus trees can be seen to the left and right of the stairway.

Fishing and seafood processing remain Vardø's major sources of income, although tourism is starting to become an important economic factor.

Vardø's tourist attractions include the Vardøhus Festning, a fortress dating back to the 14th century (although the present structure dates from 1734); the witchcraft trials memorial; several sea bird colonies; two museums: the Pomor Museum and the Partisan Museum; and remnants of German fortifications from World War II. The Yukigassen competition in Vardø is unique in Norway.

Vardøhus Festning is home to two rowan trees that are diligently nurtured and warmed in winter since they cannot normally survive in Vardø's climate, north of the Arctic tree line. Seven trees were planted in 1960; the one that survived managed to blossom twice, in 1974 and 1981. It finally succumbed to the cold in 2002, but two new saplings have been planted in its place.

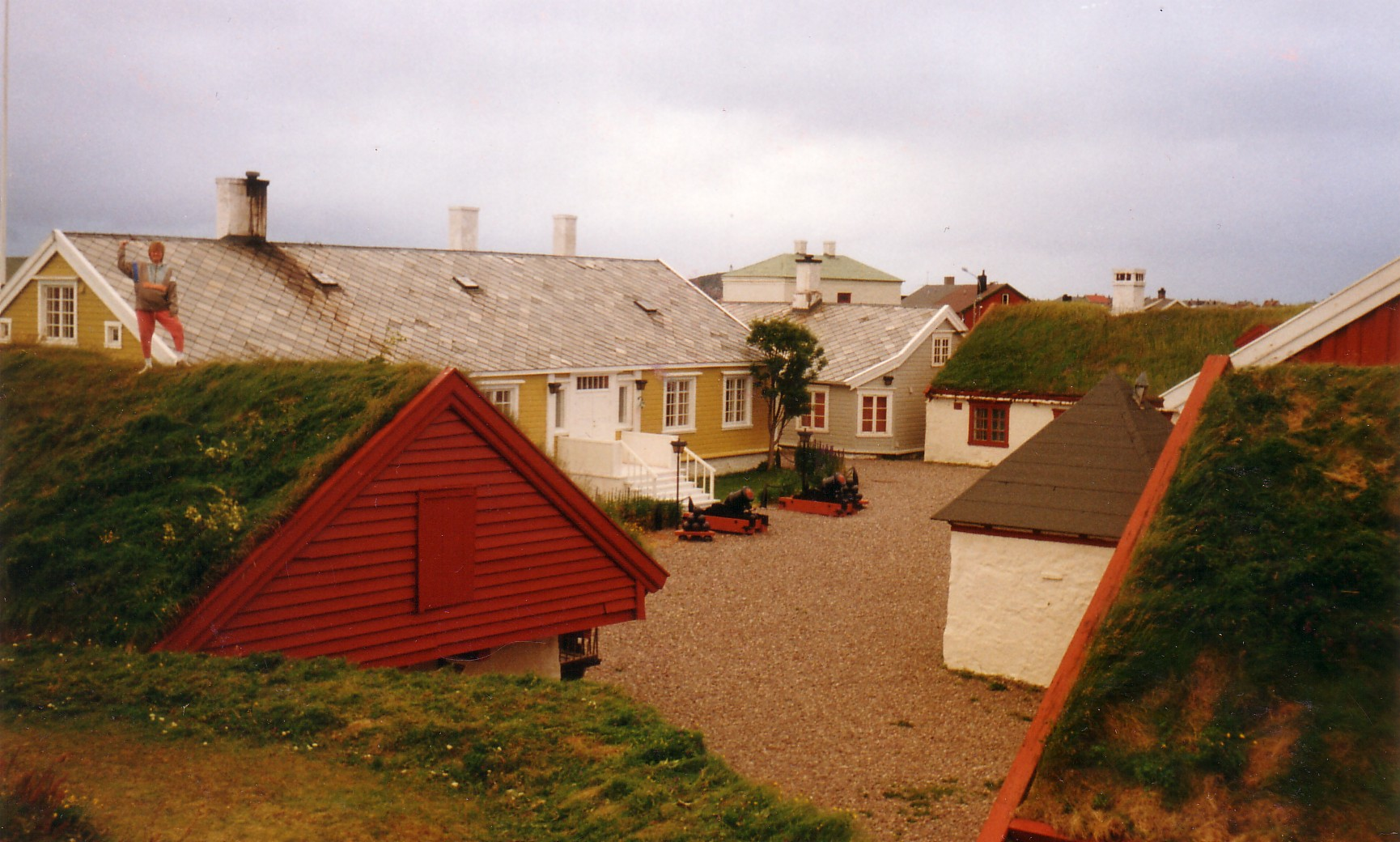
Vardøhus Fortress with the city's sole tree, which is wrapped before each winter.

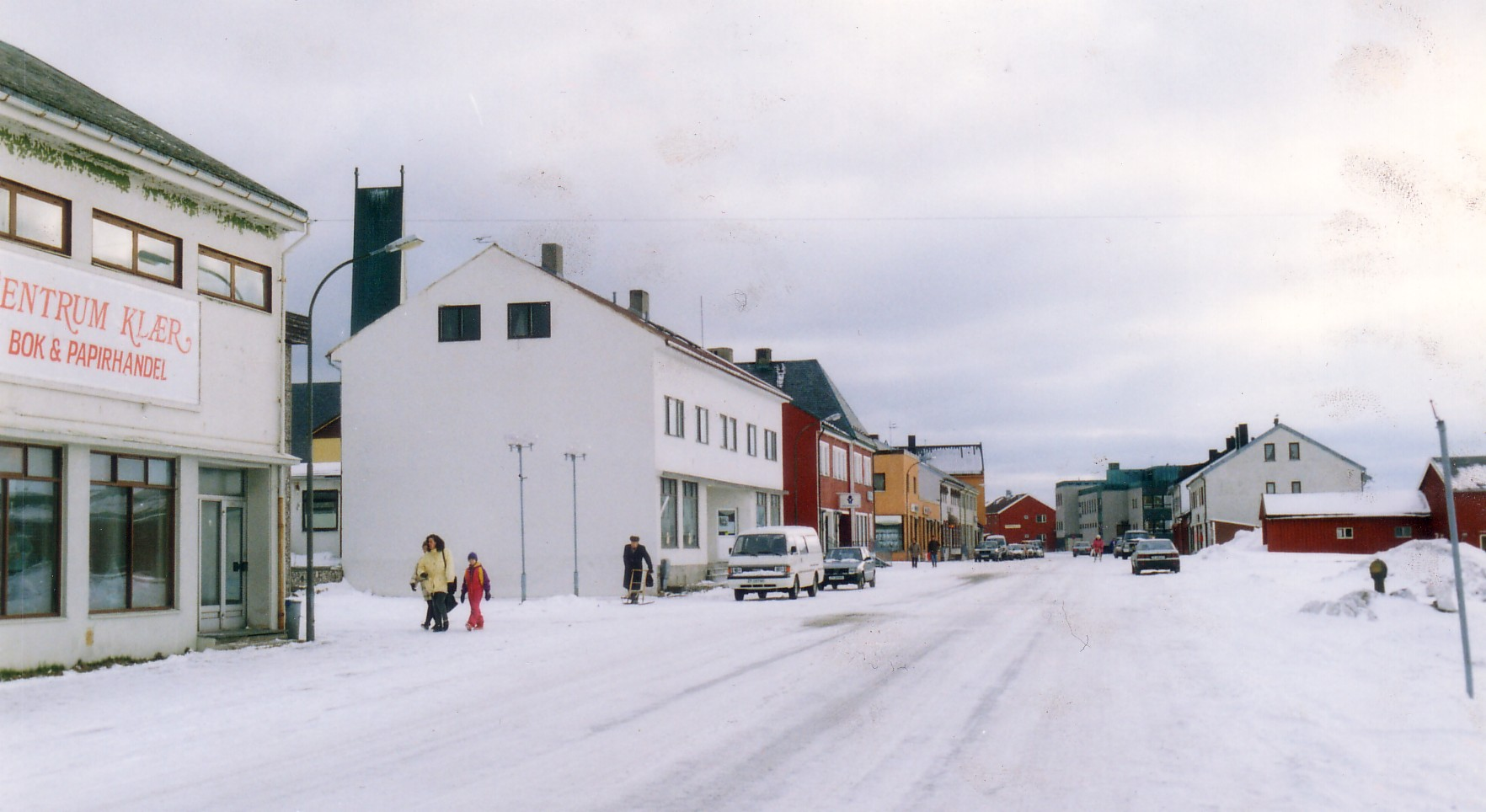
The street of Strandgaten in Vardø

In the summer of 2012, Vardø hosted the urban art event Komafest, where 12 international artists painted tens of the town's abandoned houses in a three-week period.

=== River fishing ===
Fishing permits (for salmon fishing) are sold for use on specific rivers, including Komag-elva.

== GLOBUS Radar ==
Since 1998, the town has housed radar installations called GLOBUS I, II and III. Its official purpose is the tracking of space junk, but due to the site's proximity to Russia and an alleged connection between the GLOBUS system and US anti-missile systems, the site has been the basis for heated controversy in diplomatic and intelligence circles. In March 2017 and again in February 2018 Russia executed mock air strikes aimed at Vardø, presumably because of the radar site. Both times military aircraft took off from the Kola Peninsula in attack formations, but stopped short of Norwegian airspace.

== Sister City ==
- Kemijärvi, Finland

== Notable people ==
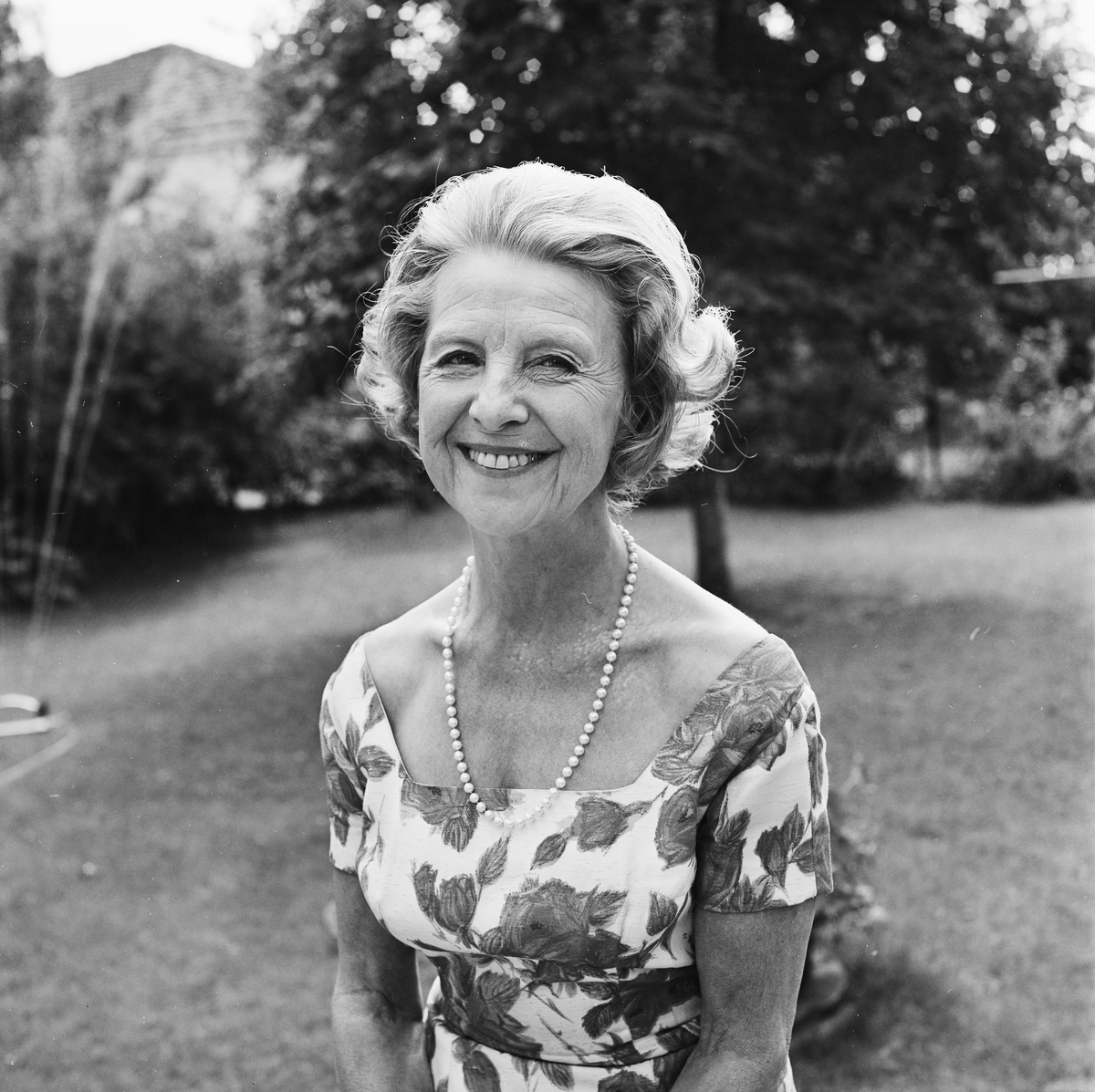
Ada Kramm, 1966

- Viktor Esbensen (1881 in Vardø – 1942), a mariner who explored the Antarctic region
- Jon Andrå (1888–1966), a politician who was mayor of Vardø from 1925 to 1930
- Peder Ragnar Holt (1899 in Vardø – 1963), a politician who was the first person from Finnmark county to be the Governor of Finnmark
- Ada Kramm (1899 in Vardø – 1981), a stage and film actress
- Haakon Bugge Mahrt (1901 in Vardø – 1990), a writer and press attaché at the Norwegian embassy in Paris from 1946 to 1971
- Alfred Næss (1927 in Vardø – 1997), a playwright and songwriter
- Trond Øyen (1929 in Vardø – 1999), a violinist who was the first violinist with the Oslo Philharmonic
- Hans Kristian Eriksen (1933 in Kiberg – 2014), a non-fiction writer, magazine editor, novelist, and short story writer
- John Norum (born 1964 in Vardø), a Norwegian/Swedish rock guitarist and co-founder of the Swedish rock band Europe
- Stefan Johansen (born 1991 in Vardø), a professional footballer with over 300 club caps and 55 for Norway
- Yngve Hågensen (1938 in Vardø - 2023), a labour union leader
