= Vardøya =

Island in Finnmark, Norway

Vardøya (Norwegian); Várggáidsuolu (Northern Sami); Vuoreansaari (Kven)
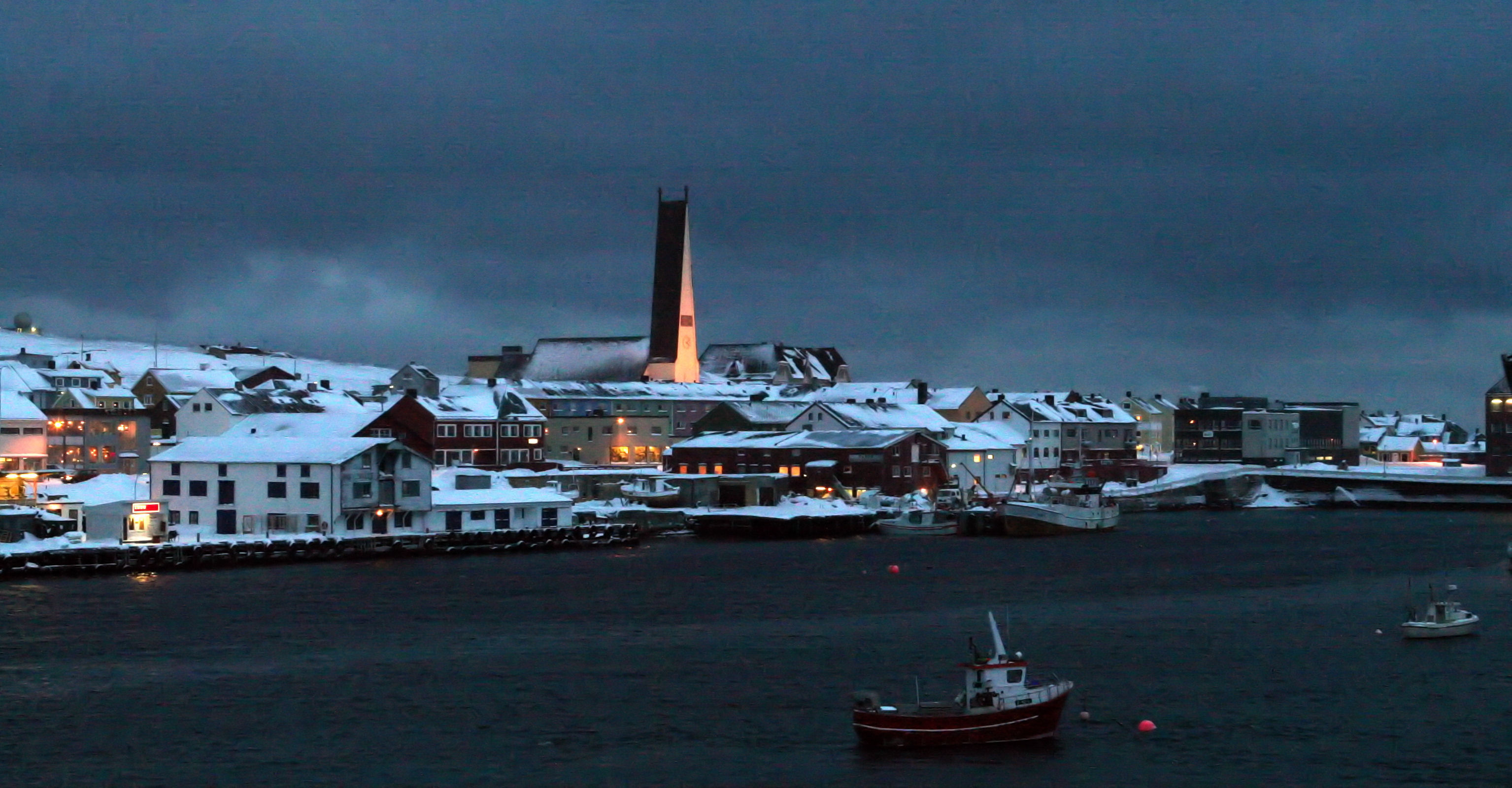
- Vardø, Norway
- Interactive map of: Vardøya (Norwegian); Várggáidsuolu (Northern Sami); Vuoreansaari (Kven)

Geography
- Location: Finnmark, Norway
- Coordinates: 70.3754°N 31.1205°E
- Area: 3.7 km^{2} (1.4 sq mi)
- Length: 5 km (3.1 mi)
- Width: 1.5 km (0.93 mi)
- Highest elevation: 60 m (200 ft)
- Highest point: Vårberget

Administration
- Norway
- County: Finnmark
- Municipality: Vardø Municipality

Vardøya (Norwegian), Várggáidsuolu (Northern Sami), or Vuoreansaari (Kven) is an island in Vardø Municipality in Finnmark county, Norway. The 3.7-square-kilometre (1.4 sq mi) island is the location of the town of Vardø. The island sits about 1.5 kilometres (0.93 mi) east of the mainland Varanger Peninsula. The island is connected to the mainland by the Vardø Tunnel, the first subsea tunnel that was built in Norway. The tunnel is part of the European route E75 highway, which has its terminus at the town of Vardø. The small island of Hornøya (where the Vardø Lighthouse sits) is 1.5 kilometres (0.93 mi) to the northeast of Vardøya.

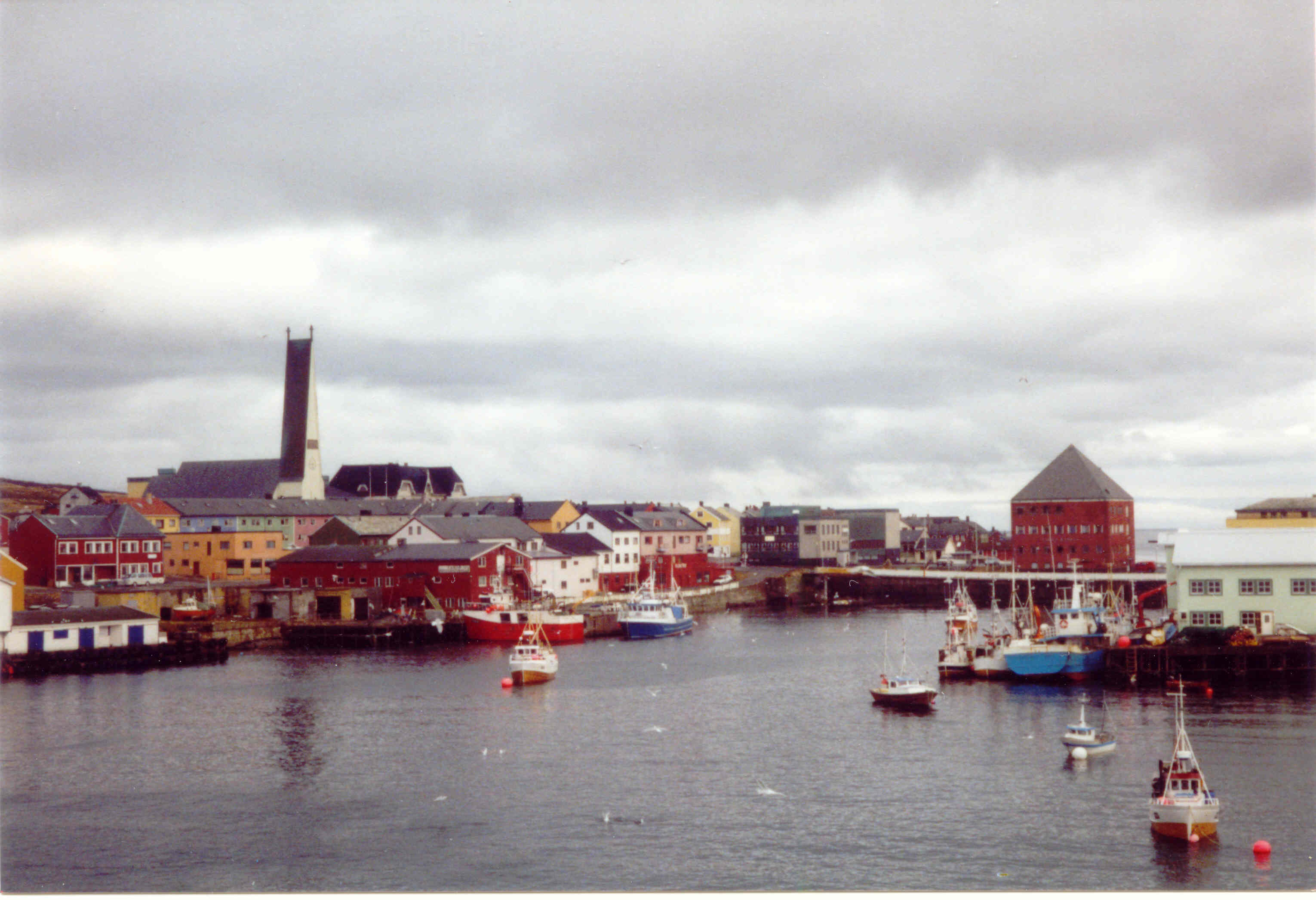
Harbor area, Vardøya

== History ==
The island was probably originally two separate islands with a small strait between them; sometime during the Middle Ages a human-made isthmus was built connecting the two islands. Today there is a 100-metre (330 ft) wide isthmus called Valen that connects both sides of Vardøya. Between the two parts of Vardøya is a long harbor. The town of Vardø was built up on this island primarily because it was the site of the Vardøhus Fortress (the island was often historically referred to as Vardöhuus, after the fortress). The fortress along with a church was originally built in 1306 by order of king Hakon V and the fortress is still in operation today.

The island (and fortress) were made famous by the historic 1553 voyage in search of the fabled Northeast passage. As the vessels rounded the rocky shores of Northern Norway they came in conflict with a 'whirlwind'. Two of the three ships (The Bona Esperanza and the Confidentia) were blown off course. The Bona Esperanza was captained by Sir Hugh Willoughby, a man of 'goodly personage' but one who had absolutely no knowledge of navigation. The expedition leader, Richard Chancellor had planned for such an eventuality, suggesting that the ships regroup at Vardöhuus. After waiting seven days and hearing nothing of either ship, he pushed eastward towards the White Sea.

== See also ==
- List of islands of Norway
