= Vardø (town) =

City/town within Vardø Municipality, Finnmark, Norway

Vardø: Vardø (Norwegian); Várggát (Northern Sami); Vuorea (Kven)
- Town/City
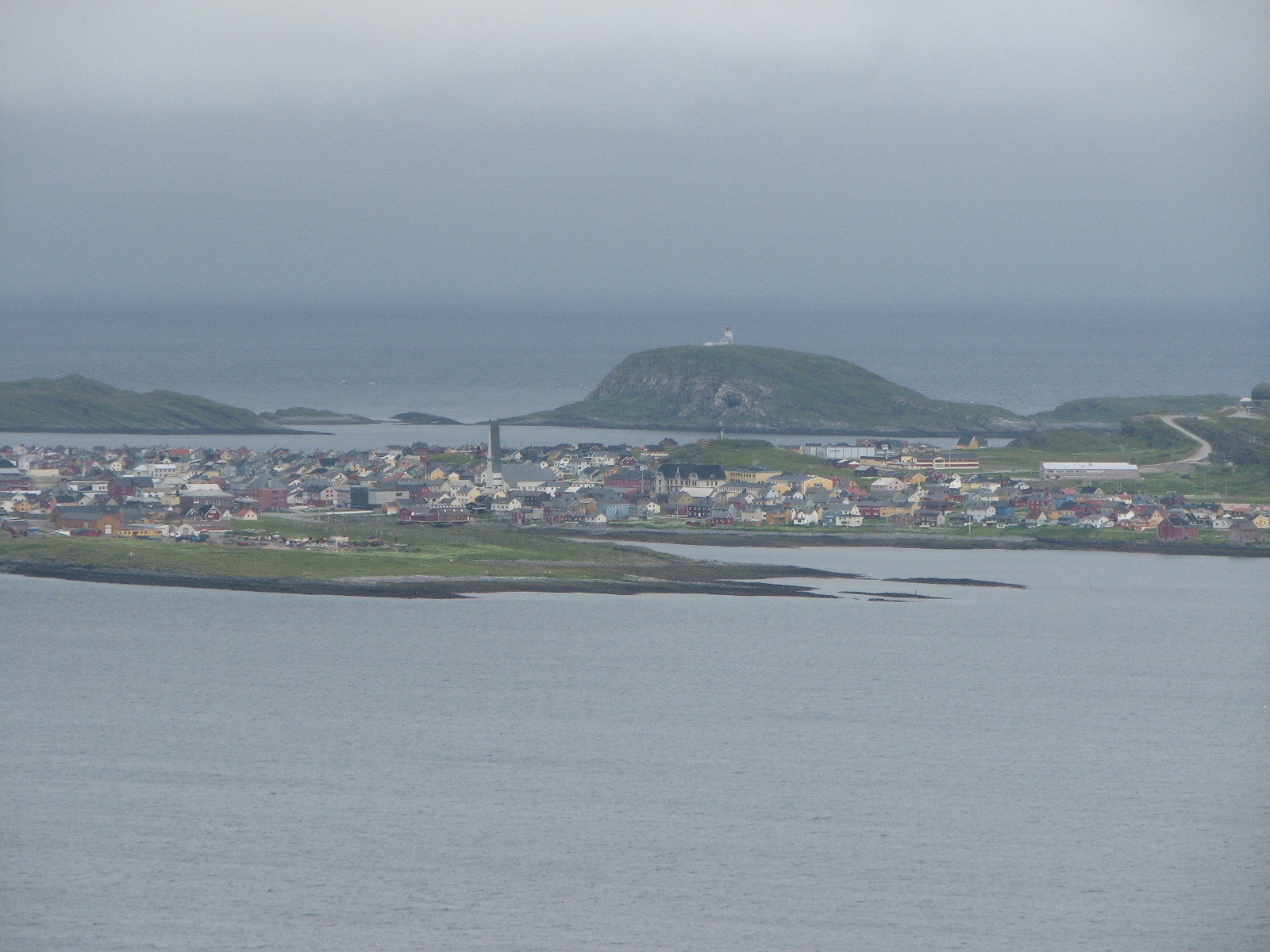
- View of the town from the mainland
- Interactive map of Vardø
- Location within Finnmark Location within Norway
- Coordinates: 70°22′13″N 31°06′38″E
- Country: Norway
- Region: Northern Norway
- County: Finnmark
- District: Øst-Finnmark
- Municipality: Vardø Municipality
- Established as
- Kjøpstad: 1789

Area
  - Total: 1.2 km^{2} (0.46 sq mi)
- Elevation: 9 m (30 ft)

Population (2023)
  - Total: 1,727
  - Density: 1,439/km^{2} (3,730/sq mi)
- Demonym: Vardøværing
- Time zone: UTC+01:00 (CET)
  - Summer (DST): UTC+02:00 (CEST)
- Post Code: 9950 Vardø

Vardø (Norwegian; pronounced [vaɖːø]), Várggát (Northern Sami), or Vuorea (Kven) is a town and the administrative centre of Vardø Municipality in Finnmark county, Norway. The town is located on the island of Vardøya in the Barents Sea, just off the coast of the large Varanger Peninsula. The 1.2-square-kilometre (300-acre) town has a population (2023) of 1,727 which gives the town a population density of 1,439 inhabitants per square kilometre (3,730/sq mi).

Vardø is the easternmost town in Norway (and in all the Nordic countries), located at 31°E, which is east of Saint Petersburg, Kyiv, and Istanbul. The eastern part of Finnmark is in the same time zone as the rest of the country, but it is more than an hour at odds with daylight hours.

The largest industry in the town is fishing and fish processing. There is a good port in Vardø, and another port in nearby Svartnes, on the mainland. The town is connected to the mainland by the undersea Vardø Tunnel which is part of European route E75. Vardø Airport, Svartnes is located at the other end of the tunnel on the mainland.

== History ==
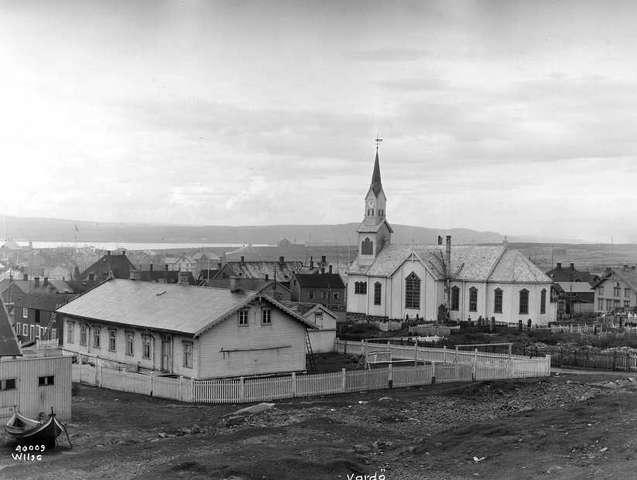
View of Vardø Church in 1933, before the town was burned down in World War II

The village of Vardø, on the island of Vardøya, was made important because of the Vardøhus Fortress that was built on the island in the early 14th century. The village grew up around the fortress and became a major trading post between the Norwegians in Finnmark county and the nearby Russians. In the 17th century, Vardø was a centre of several high-profile witch trials, most notably the 1621 witch trial and 1662 witch trials.

Pomor trade was very important in the 18th century, and Vardø was often called the Pomor capital. Because of this, in 1789 the King of Norway granted Vardø town status as a kjøpstad.

On 1 January 1838, the town and the surrounding rural district were established as the new municipality of Vardø by og landdistrikt, meaning "Vardø town and rural district" (see Formannskapsdistrikt). This arrangement did not entirely satisfy the new formannskapsdistrikt law, so in 1839, the town was separated from the rural district to form its own town-municipality. Since the Vardø landdistrikt outside the town had too few residents (according to the law), one municipal government was shared between the two until 22 May 1868 when a royal resolution was passed making them completely separate and self-governing. On 1 January 1874, a small area of Vardø landdistrikt (population: 48) was transferred to the town of Vardø. On 1 January 1964, the eastern part of Båtsfjord Municipality (population: 621) was merged with the town of Vardø, forming the new (present-day) Vardø Municipality.

== Etymology ==
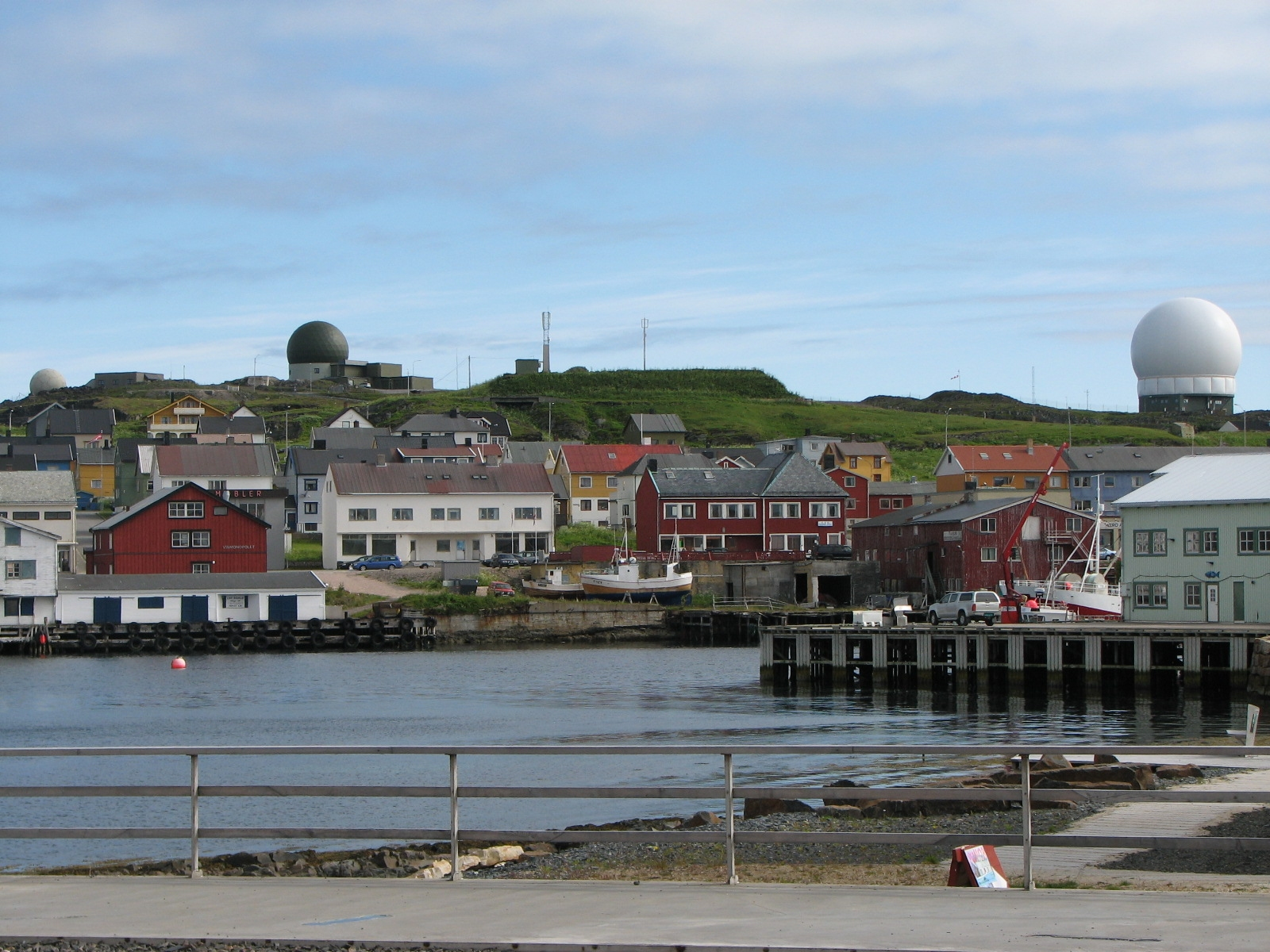
View of the harbor in the summer, with the Globus radar in the background

The town is named after the island on which it is located: Vardøya. The Old Norse form of the name was Vargøy. The first element is vargr which means "wolf". The first element was later replaced (around 1500) with varða which means "cairn". The last element is øy which means "island".

== Climate ==
Since Vardø in 1830, average annual temperature data recorded by weather stations illustrate the phenomenon of global warming.

The port of Vardø, on the Barents Sea, remains ice-free all year round thanks to the warm North Atlantic drift. Vardø earlier had a tundra climate (Köppen: ET), but as a result of warming, Vardø now has a subarctic climate (Köppen: Dfc) using the official 1991-2020 period, because the monthly mean temperatures in July and August has passed the 10 °C (50 °F) threshold. Excluding high mountain areas, it was earlier the only town in Norway proper (excluding Svalbard and Jan Mayen) with a polar climate. The town is on an unsheltered island in the Barents Sea and treeless. The "midnight sun" is above the horizon from 16 May to 29 July, and the period with continuous daylight lasts a bit longer, polar night from 24 November to 19 January. The average date for first overnight freeze (below 0 °C (32 °F)) in autumn is October 12. The weather station Vardø Radio (10 m) started recording in June 1829.

Climate data for Vardø (10 m, Vardø Radio), 1991–2020 normals, extremes 1829–present
Month	Jan	Feb	Mar	Apr	May	Jun	Jul	Aug	Sep	Oct	Nov	Dec	Year
Record high °C (°F)	7.3 (45.1)	6.9 (44.4)	8.4 (47.1)	13.3 (55.9)	21.1 (70.0)	25.8 (78.4)	27.3 (81.1)	25.1 (77.2)	20.1 (68.2)	13.8 (56.8)	10.4 (50.7)	7.3 (45.1)	27.3 (81.1)
Mean maximum °C (°F)	3.6 (38.5)	3.3 (37.9)	3.6 (38.5)	6.8 (44.2)	12.7 (54.9)	16.8 (62.2)	20.0 (68.0)	19.1 (66.4)	15.2 (59.4)	9.9 (49.8)	5.6 (42.1)	4.8 (40.6)	21.4 (70.5)
Mean daily maximum °C (°F)	−1.2 (29.8)	−1.8 (28.8)	−0.4 (31.3)	2.2 (36.0)	5.8 (42.4)	9.1 (48.4)	12.3 (54.1)	12.3 (54.1)	9.8 (49.6)	5.0 (41.0)	1.7 (35.1)	0.2 (32.4)	4.6 (40.3)
Daily mean °C (°F)	−3.5 (25.7)	−3.9 (25.0)	−2.3 (27.9)	0.3 (32.5)	3.8 (38.8)	7.0 (44.6)	10.0 (50.0)	10.1 (50.2)	7.8 (46.0)	3.3 (37.9)	−0.2 (31.6)	−2.0 (28.4)	2.5 (36.6)
Mean daily minimum °C (°F)	−6.0 (21.2)	−6.5 (20.3)	−4.5 (23.9)	−1.6 (29.1)	1.8 (35.2)	5.0 (41.0)	8.0 (46.4)	8.2 (46.8)	5.9 (42.6)	1.5 (34.7)	−2.2 (28.0)	−4.3 (24.3)	0.4 (32.8)
Mean minimum °C (°F)	−12.8 (9.0)	−12.8 (9.0)	−9.8 (14.4)	−7.2 (19.0)	−2.3 (27.9)	1.7 (35.1)	5.3 (41.5)	4.5 (40.1)	1.8 (35.2)	−4.2 (24.4)	−7.9 (17.8)	−10.3 (13.5)	−14.5 (5.9)
Record low °C (°F)	−22.5 (−8.5)	−22.7 (−8.9)	−20.5 (−4.9)	−14.4 (6.1)	−10.3 (13.5)	−3.9 (25.0)	−1.6 (29.1)	−0.4 (31.3)	−4.8 (23.4)	−13.2 (8.2)	−15.0 (5.0)	−20.1 (−4.2)	−22.7 (−8.9)
Average precipitation mm (inches)	59.1 (2.33)	50.6 (1.99)	51.8 (2.04)	40.3 (1.59)	35.6 (1.40)	46.0 (1.81)	55.0 (2.17)	55.2 (2.17)	46.6 (1.83)	70.9 (2.79)	52.8 (2.08)	60.0 (2.36)	623.9 (24.56)
Average extreme snow depth cm (inches)	62 (24)	83 (33)	98 (39)	97 (38)	59 (23)	10 (3.9)	0 (0)	0 (0)	1 (0.4)	8 (3.1)	21 (8.3)	42 (17)	110 (43)
Average precipitation days	16	13	13	11	9	8	9	9	10	16	13	14	141
Average relative humidity (%)	85	85	82	81	82	84	87	86	84	83	84	84	84
Average dew point °C (°F)	−6.3 (20.7)	−6.6 (20.1)	−5.4 (22.3)	−2.6 (27.3)	0.5 (32.9)	3.9 (39.0)	7.7 (45.9)	7.4 (45.3)	5.7 (42.3)	0.9 (33.6)	−2.2 (28.0)	−3.9 (25.0)	−0.1 (31.8)
Source 1: Norwegian Meteorological Institute (dew point and humidity 1991-2020, extreme snow depth 1897-1950 and extremes)
Source 2: NOAA WMO averages 91-2020 Norway

== GLOBUS Radar ==
Since 1998, the town has housed radar installations called GLOBUS I, II and III. Its official purpose is the tracking of space junk; however, due to the site's proximity to Russia, and an alleged connection between the GLOBUS system and US anti-missile systems, the site has been the basis for heated controversy in diplomatic and intelligence circles.

An upgrade to the radar system, GLOBUS III, started construction in 2016 and became operational in 2023. The Russian military considers the radar station a threat to its national security.

== See also ==
- List of towns and cities in Norway
