= Båtsfjord =

Båtsfjord may refer to:

== Places ==
- Båtsfjord Municipality, a municipality in Finnmark county, Norway
- Båtsfjord (village), a village in Båtsfjord municipality in Finnmark county, Norway
- Båtsfjord Airport, an airport in Båtsfjord municipality in Finnmark county, Norway
- Båtsfjord Airport (1973–99), an airport used from 1973 to 1999 in Båtsfjord municipality in Finnmark county, Norway
- Båtsfjord Church, a church in Båtsfjord municipality in Finnmark county, Norway
- Båtsfjord, or Båtsfjorden, a fjord in Båtsfjord municipality in Finnmark county, Norway
