= Frank Bakke-Jensen =

Norwegian politician (born 1965)

Frank Bakke-Jensen MP
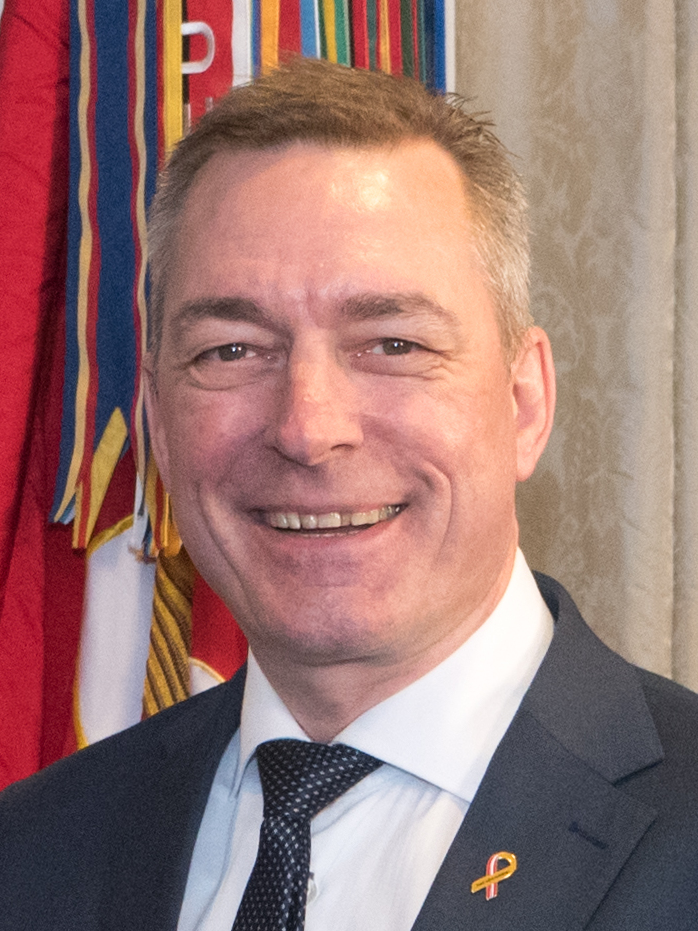
- Bakke-Jensen in 2018

Minister of Defence
- In office 20 October 2017 – 14 October 2021
- Prime Minister: Erna Solberg
- Preceded by: Ine Eriksen Søreide
- Succeeded by: Odd Roger Enoksen

Minister of European Affairs
- In office 20 December 2016 – 20 October 2017
- Prime Minister: Erna Solberg
- Preceded by: Elisabeth Aspaker
- Succeeded by: Marit Berger Røsland

Minister of Nordic Cooperation
- In office 20 December 2016 – 17 January 2018
- Prime Minister: Erna Solberg
- Preceded by: Elisabeth Aspaker
- Succeeded by: Jan Tore Sanner

Member of the Storting
- In office 1 October 2009 – 30 September 2021
- Deputy: Laila Davidsen; Marianne Haukland
- Constituency: Finnmark

Mayor of Båtsfjord Municipality
- In office 24 October 2007 – 15 October 2009
- Preceded by: Geir Knutsen
- Succeeded by: Gunn Marit Nilsen

Personal details
- Born: 8 March 1965 (age 61) Båtsfjord, Finnmark, Norway
- Party: Conservative
- Spouse(s): Hilde Sjurelv; Liv Hansen (formerly)
- Children: 3

Frank Bakke-Jensen (born 8 March 1965 in Båtsfjord) is a Norwegian politician for the Conservative Party. He served as minister of defence from 2017 to 2021, and minister of European affairs from 2016 to 2017. He was mayor of Båtsfjord Municipality from 2007 until his election to the Storting from Finnmark in 2009. Bakke-Jensen formerly worked as a ship's electrician between Hammerfest and Tromsø, and has also worked as a teacher and self-employed pilot at Båtsfjord Airport. He has also performed military service in the UN Lebanon conflict.

== Career ==
=== Mayor of Båtsfjord ===
Bakke-Jensen was elected mayor of Båtsfjord Municipality in 2007, despite the Labour Party winning 54.7 percent of the vote, and nine of the fifteen representatives in the municipality. After the elections for mayor saw many the Labour Party split from the party, and when the elections saw two of the breakaway groups elected. One of the breakaway groups did not attend the nomination meeting, and the other did not vote with his party. Therefore, Bakke-Jensen was elected with the Conservative's four votes, Progress Party's two representatives deciding not to support the Labour Party. As mayor, Bakke-Jensen notably decided that Båtsfjord should have its own high school within the municipality.

=== Minister of European Affairs ===
Bakke-Jensen entered the Solberg cabinet following a reshuffle in December 2016, when he was appointed Minister of European Affairs and Minister of Nordic Cooperation.

In early January 2017, Bakke-Jensen issued an apology for a piece criticising the EU and EEA, which later turned out not to be written by him, but by Progress Party politician Jan Henrik Fredriksen. Bakke-Jensen further explained that Finnmark Dagblad had made a mistake, and that they had been sent the article by Fredriksen, but had mistakenly added Bakke-Jensen's name and picture.

In May, Centre Party leader Trygve Slagsvold Vedum asked Bakke-Jensen in a parliamentary session, if he supported Erna Solberg's former statement that they would want to install the Euro in Norway. Bakke-Jensen said that there currently was no debate on EU membership and that it didn't have a first priority.

In early September, Bakke-Jensen expressed that Norway has to keep in mind that any future deals with the United Kingdom in a subsequent exit from the European Union, would be worse for Norwegians.

=== Minister of Defence ===
Following the Solberg cabinet's re-election in 2017, he was appointed Minister of Defence when Ine Eriksen Søreide was appointed Minister of Foreign Affairs.

Following the loss of the KNM Helge Ingstad on 8 November 2018, Bakke-Jensen remained at odds with the media, criticising them for "colouring, twisting and turning" the case. He later expressed that they had to understand that he wanted to wait for the investigation to figure out the timeline of events before he would make any further comments on the matter. NRK noted it wasn't the first time Bakke-Jensen had thrown a tantrum and listed at least four other instances he did.

In a parliamentary session on 5 February 2019, Bakke-Jensen announced that the raising of the KNM Helge Ingstad would begin that coming Thursday. In addition to citing the impact the accident had on the Armed Forces and Navy's operative ability, he added that there could be a possibility of buying new submarines and surveillance aircraft.

In March, he was allowed to see the inside of the wreck of the KNM Helge Ingstad. After viewing the inside, he stated that it looks "worse than I had thought".

On 11 April 2020, he announced that he didn't want to seek re-election to Parliament.

On 12 May, he presented Eirik Kristoffersen as the government's nominee for Chief of Defence, succeeding retiring Haakon Bruun-Hanssen. Of Kristoffersen, Bakke-Jensen said: "Kristoffersen has left a clear mark on where he has been. He has shown very good results in the Armed Forces' special forces and as commander of HV. In his short time as commander of the Army, he has ensured that the Finnmark Land Defence structure is now ahead of schedule".

In August 2021, at the height of the escalation of the Taliban takeover in Afghanistan, Bakke-Jensen attended a Conservative election campaign stand in Alta. He received criticism for the timing of the attendance, prompting similarities with his Danish counterpart Trine Bramsen who attended a concert with prime minister Mette Frederiksen at the same time. Bakke-Jensen didn't elaborate any further explanation, other than through an email, where he stated that "I adapt the travel activity to the situation, and the technology has given us tools that enable good contact with both the ministry and the Armed Forces".

=== Directorate of Fisheries ===
In September 2020, he was nominated to become the new director of the Directorate of Fisheries. Despite having no formal qualifications for the position, he got the job (Director of Fisheries) and assumed office on 1 December 2021. Bakke-Jensen claimed that he did not call the Minister of Fisheries, Odd Emil Ingebrigtsen, about the job; however, Ingebrigtsen told media that he had been phoned by Bakke-Jensen in regard to the job position. Some MPs expected the government to explain in parliament how the matter was handled.

In August 2022, under Bakke-Jensen's leadership, the Directorate of Fisheries killed Freya the Walrus, who had made Oslofjord her home for much of that summer and gained a global following. Following Freya's death, he and his family received global death threats.

== Military service ==
From 30 August 1990 to 29 November 1991, he was in Lebanon as a soldier for United Nations Interim Force in Lebanon(UNIFIL) in contingents 26 and 27, where he was a radio operator in Tibnin in southern Lebanon.

Later, he spent several years in the Homeguard, where he took a squad leader and later a platoon commander course. He has also taken the elite course at the Norwegian Defence Staff College.

== Storting committees ==
- 2009–2013 member of the Standing Committee on Business and Industry
- 2013–2017 member of the Standing Committee on Business and Industry

== Personal life ==
Bakke-Jensen is married to Hilde Sjurelv, with whom he has one child. He was previously married to Liv Hansen, with whom he has two children.

Political offices
Preceded by Ine Eriksen Søreide	Minister of Defence; 2017–2021	Succeeded by Odd Roger Enoksen
Preceded by Elisabeth Aspaker	Minister of European Affairs; 2016–2017	Succeeded by Marit Berger Røsland
Preceded by Geir Knutsen	Mayor of Båtsfjord Municipality; 2007–2009	Succeeded by Gunn Marit Nilsen
