= Norwegian County Road 891 =

Road in Finnmark, Norway

County Road 891

Route information
- Length: 31.5 km (19.6 mi)

Location
- Country: Norway
- Counties: Finnmark

Highway system
- Roads in Norway; National Roads; County Roads

County Road 891 (Norwegian: Fylkesvei 891) is a Norwegian county road in Finnmark county, Norway. Having a length of 31.5 kilometers (19.6 mi), the road runs from the village of Båtsfjord in Båtsfjord Municipality to the southwest, past the lake Geatnjajávri, to the junction of Norwegian County Road 890 in Berlevåg Municipality. The mountain pass over Båtsfjordfjellet must be closed up to 65 times each winter due to snow storms.

== History ==
Before 1 January 2010, Road 891 was a Norwegian national road, after the regional reform came into force it has the status of a county road. In 2019, County Road 331 became part of Road 891.
