= Båtsfjord Airport (1973–1999) =

Båtsfjord Airport Båtsfjord flyplass
- IATA: none; ICAO: none

Summary
- Airport type: Public
- Owner: Båtsfjord Municipality (1976–96); Civil Aviation Administration (1997–99)
- Serves: Båtsfjord
- Location: Båtsfjorddalen, Båtsfjord, Finnmark, Norway
- Elevation AMSL: 38 m / 124 ft
- Coordinates: 70°36′02″N 029°39′32″E

Map
- Location in Norway

Runways
| Direction | Length | | Surface |
| Direction | m | ft | Surface |
|---|---|---|---|
| 01–19 | 800 | 2,600 | Gravel |

Statistics (1994)
- Passengers: 12,000

Båtsfjord Airport (Norwegian: Båtsfjord flyplass) is a former regional airport located at Båtsfjorddalen just south of the village of Båtsfjord in Båtsfjord Municipality in Finnmark county, Norway. It consisted of an 800-by-30-meter (2,625 by 98 ft) gravel runway aligned 01–19 (roughly north–south) and had a simple terminal building. Construction of the airport was started a local aviation club in 1972 and was completed with a 600-meter (2,000 ft) runway in May 1973. The runway was extended the following year and in 1976 the airport was municipalized. From the start Norving operated air taxi and air ambulance flights. Following an upgraded terminal in 1978, the taxi services became scheduled and the Britten-Norman Islander was introduced to Kirkenes and Vadsø. From 1983 the Dornier 228 entered service on the Båtsfjord route.

Widerøe took over the route with its de Havilland Canada Twin Otter in 1990. From 1993 Widerøe started replacing these with the larger de Havilland Canada Dash 8 aircraft, but had to keep one Twin Otter in operation past 1995 because it could not land on the gravel runway at Båtsfjord. To allow for Dash 8 services, a new airport was built further up in the valley. It opened on 9 September 1999, the same day the old airport was closed.

== History ==
Varangfly, later renamed Norving, was the first airline to operate regularly to Båtsfjord. Using seaplanes they flew both air taxi and air ambulance services to Kirkenes, starting in the 1960s. The regular services were terminated in 1963 with the opening of Kirkenes Airport, Høybuktmoen. Varangfly applied to the government for concession and subsidies to operate to Båtsfjord, but the application was rejected. In 1964 Varangfly took initiative to develop plans for a small airfield in Båtsfjord and several other villages in Finnmark. This was followed up by the regional authorities; a Finnmark County Council-appointed committee published a report in 1966 recommending Båtsfjord as one of six regional airports in Finnmark. As the county had the lowest priority on the state-financed construction of regional airports, there were many locals who called for an intermediate solution with locally financed and simpler airfields. Båtsfjord was considered for inclusion in the state-financed regional network, but skipped when it proved difficult to find a suitable location.

The aviation club Båtsfjord Flyklubb was established to build an airfield. The club was able to secure sufficient funding to start construction in 1972. The airport opened in May 1973 with a 600-by-30-meter (1,969 by 98 ft) gravel runway, which was extended to 800 meters (2,600 ft) the following year. The aviation club was initially responsible for operations in cooperation with the municipality and Norving. Although the airport was initially planned mainly to serve air ambulance flights, Norving also started air taxi services. The airport lost money on operations and struggled to cover its costs. Flights were flown on basis of customer ordered, at the times specified by the customers. This meant that to get reasonable prices a group would have to book a flight together. In 1975 the airline had 700 flights to the airport and transported 4000 passengers. From 1 January 1976 ownership and operations of the airport was taken over by the municipality.

Planning of scheduled flights began following the municipalization. The Civil Aviation Administration (CAA) was skeptical to such operations, citing the terrain hindrances by the location in the valley of Båtsfjorddalen. Permission was granted following municipal investments of NOK 2.5 million and Norving could start scheduled flights in 1978 with their eight-passenger Britten-Norman Islanders. Båtsfjord was the first airport in Norway to be designated as a route taxi airport. From 10 September Norving introduced a twice-daily scheduled service to Kirkenes. Norving introduced the 16 to 19-passenger Dornier 228 on the Båtsfjord run from 1983. After the airline fell into financial difficulties, negotiations between it, Widerøe and the government were initiated regarding subsidies for the route. In November 1988 Norving was offered 10 million Norwegian krone (NOK) in annual grants for the flights to Båtsfjord and Hasvik Airport, but this was insufficient to save the airline. On 2 February 1990 the ministry announced that Widerøe would take over all subsidized routes in Finnmark, including Båtsfjord. They initially flew to the airport using their Twin Otters.

The Ministry of Transport and Communications announced in February 1993 that they were considering taking over ownership and operations of the airport through the CAA. Along with Hasvik Airport and Vardø Airport, Svartnes, Båtsfjord Airport was one of three regional airports in Finnmark with government-subsidized routes which did not receive state operating grants. In December Widerøe articulated that Båtsfjord Airport did not meet the demands for future operation as it lacked proper instruments and did not have an asphalt runway. Widerøe stated that with the introduction of the Dash 8 they would no longer be able to serve the airport. The CAA stated that instead the a new airport should be built, estimated to cost between NOK 70 and 80 million. The main reason was that the old airport was poorly located in relation to the terrain. In April 1994 the ministry stated that they were considering closing many of the smallest regional airports, including Båtsfjord. The nearest other airport Berlevåg Airport is located only 39 km away by air, but much longer by road, and the road is often closed to snowstorms in the winter.

The various propositions culminated in April 1995 when Parliament decided to nationalize twenty-six regional airports owned by their respective municipalities. The considerations included a proposal to build a new airport. At the time Widerøe was obliged to operate routes to the airport until 31 March 1997. In December 1995 Widerøe took delivery of their fifteenth Dash 8 and thus their only need for a Twin Otter was to serve Båtsfjord. The government through the CAA took over ownership of the airport on 1 January 1997. Construction of a new airport cost NOK 178 million and was opened on 9 September 1999, the same day as the old airport closed.

== Facilities ==
Located in Båtsfjorddalen, the airport had an 800-by-30-meter (2,625 by 98 ft) gravel runway, aligned 01–19 at an elevation of 38 meters (125 feet). The airport terminal consisted of a single small building with an integrated control tower. The departure area had seven seats and all baggage handling took place outdoors. In 1994 the airport served 12,000 passengers.
