= Batsford (disambiguation) =

Batsford is a village in Gloucestershire.

Batsford may also refer to:

- Batsford (solitaire), a card game
- Batsford Arboretum, a garden at Batsford in Gloucestershire
- Batsford Books, a UK book publisher.
- Brian Batsford (1910–1991), a British MP and illustrator
- Allen Batsford, a British football manager
- Rich Batsford, a British musician

== See also ==
- Båtsfjord (disambiguation), a list of places in Norway
