= Marianne Haukland =

Norwegian politician (born 1989)

- Born: 1 January 1989 (age 37); Alta, Norway
- Education: University of Tromso
- Occupation: Politician
- Years active: 2017 - present
- Political party: Conservative Party
- Children: 1

Marianne Haukland (born 1 January 1989) is a Norwegian politician.

== Biography ==
Haukland was elected deputy representative to the Storting from Finnmark for the period 2017–2021 for the Conservative Party. She replaced Frank Bakke-Jensen at the Storting from October 2017, while Bakke-Jensen served as Minister of EEC- and EU affairs. In the Storting, Haukland was a member of the Standing Committee on Family and Cultural Affairs.

Haukland hails from Alta, and has studied political science at the University of Tromsø.
