= Hamningberg =

Hamningberg: Hamningberg (Norwegian); Hámbiergi (Northern Sami); Havningberg (historic)
- Abandoned Village
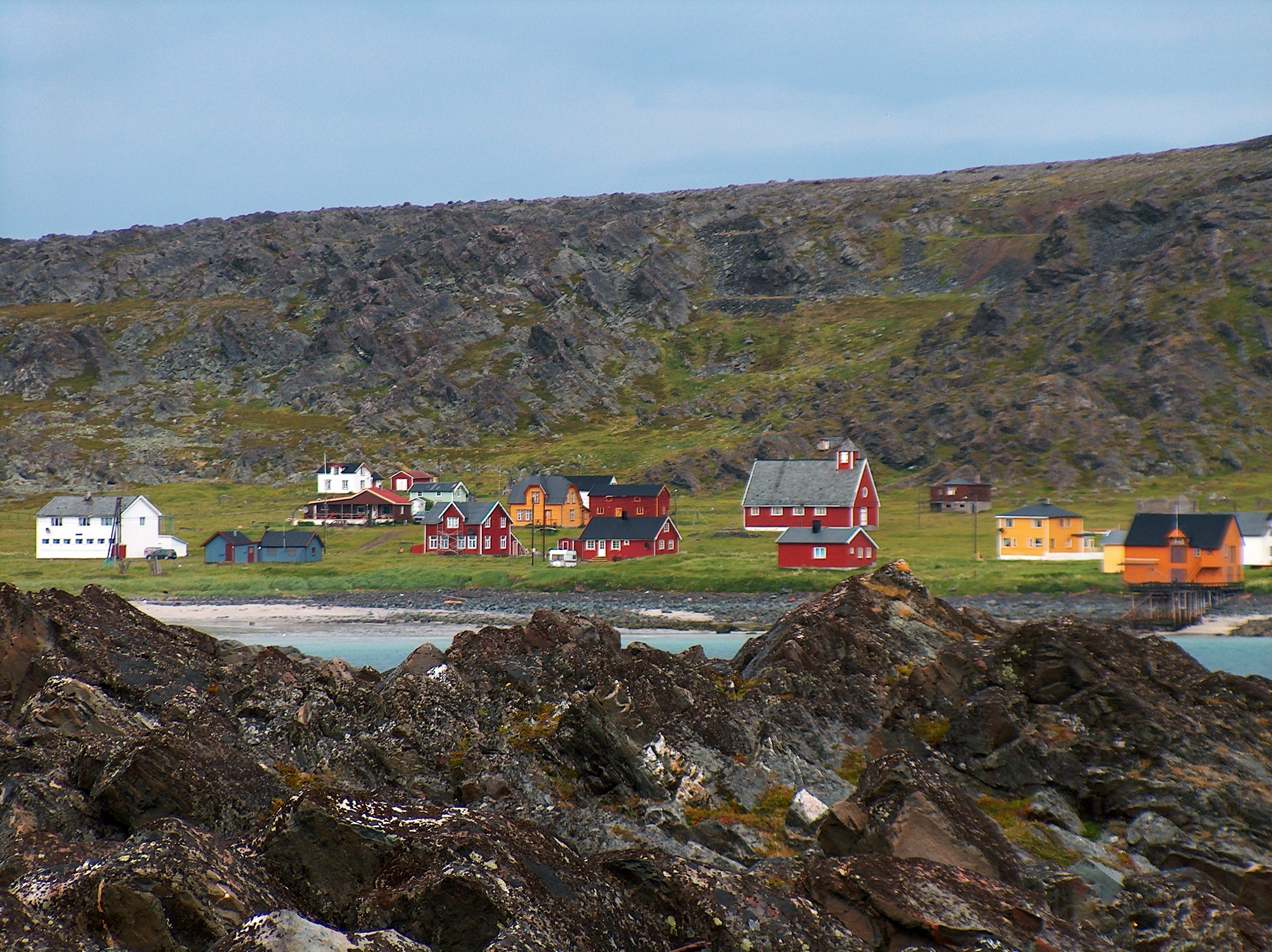
- View of the village
- Interactive map of Hamningberg
- Location within Finnmark Location within Norway
- Coordinates: 70°32′26″N 30°36′52″E
- Country: Norway
- Region: Northern Norway
- County: Finnmark
- District: Øst-Finnmark
- Municipality: Båtsfjord
- Elevation: 7 m (23 ft)
- Time zone: UTC+01:00 (CET)
  - Summer (DST): UTC+02:00 (CEST)

Hamningberg (Norwegian) or Hámbiergi (Northern Sami) is an abandoned fishing village in Båtsfjord Municipality in Finnmark county, Norway. The village lies along the northern coast of the large Varanger Peninsula on the shores of the Barents Sea. Its only road connection is through Vardø Municipality which is a rather long drive from the rest of Båtsfjord Municipality. Hamningberg Chapel is located in the village, although now it is only rarely used.

Traditionally a fishing village, it is one of very few places in all of Finnmark county that was not burned down by the retreating Germans in the latter part of the Second World War. It was depopulated and abandoned in 1964, although some of the houses are still in use as summer cottages.

== Media gallery ==
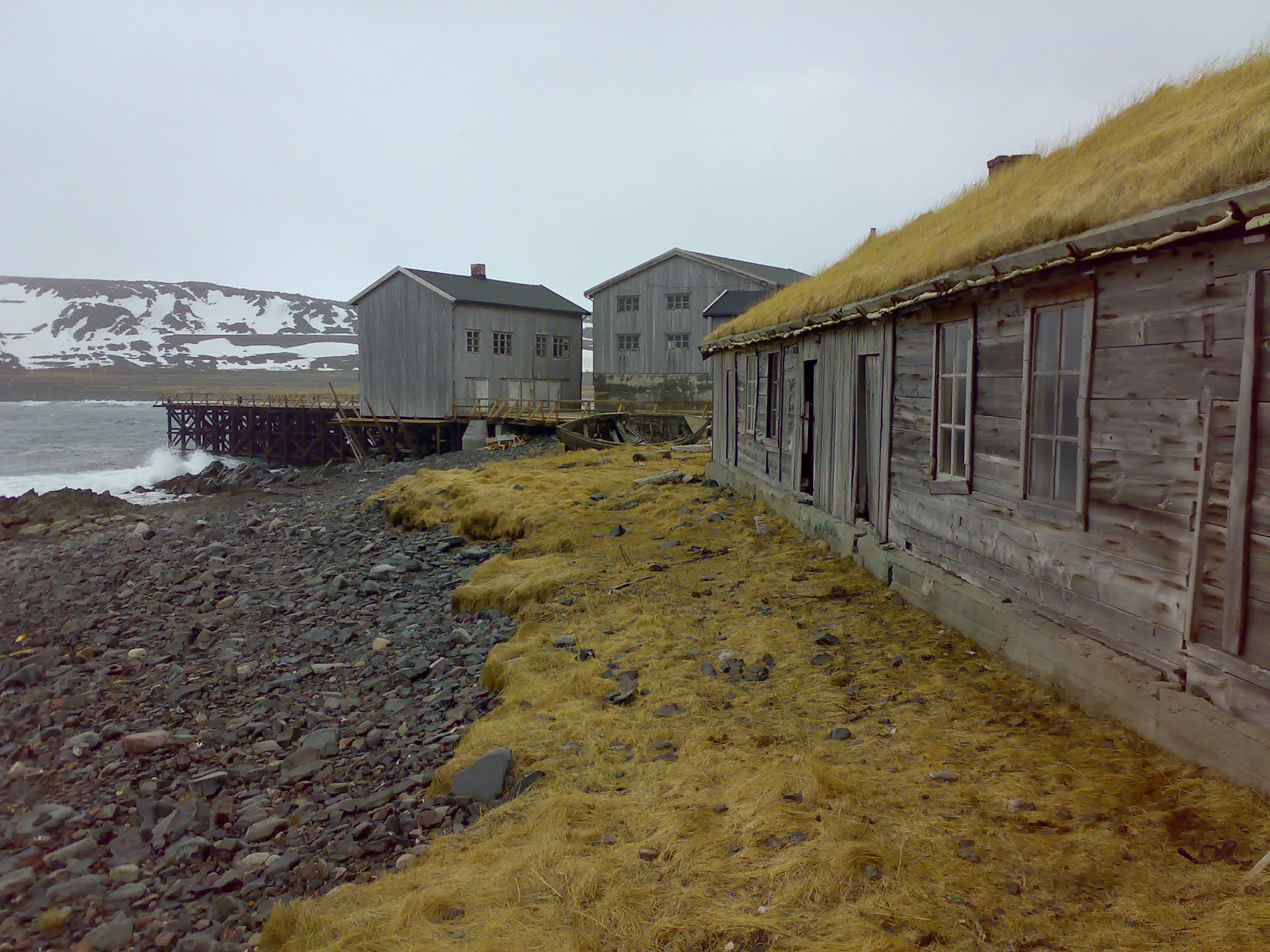
Houses in Hamningberg

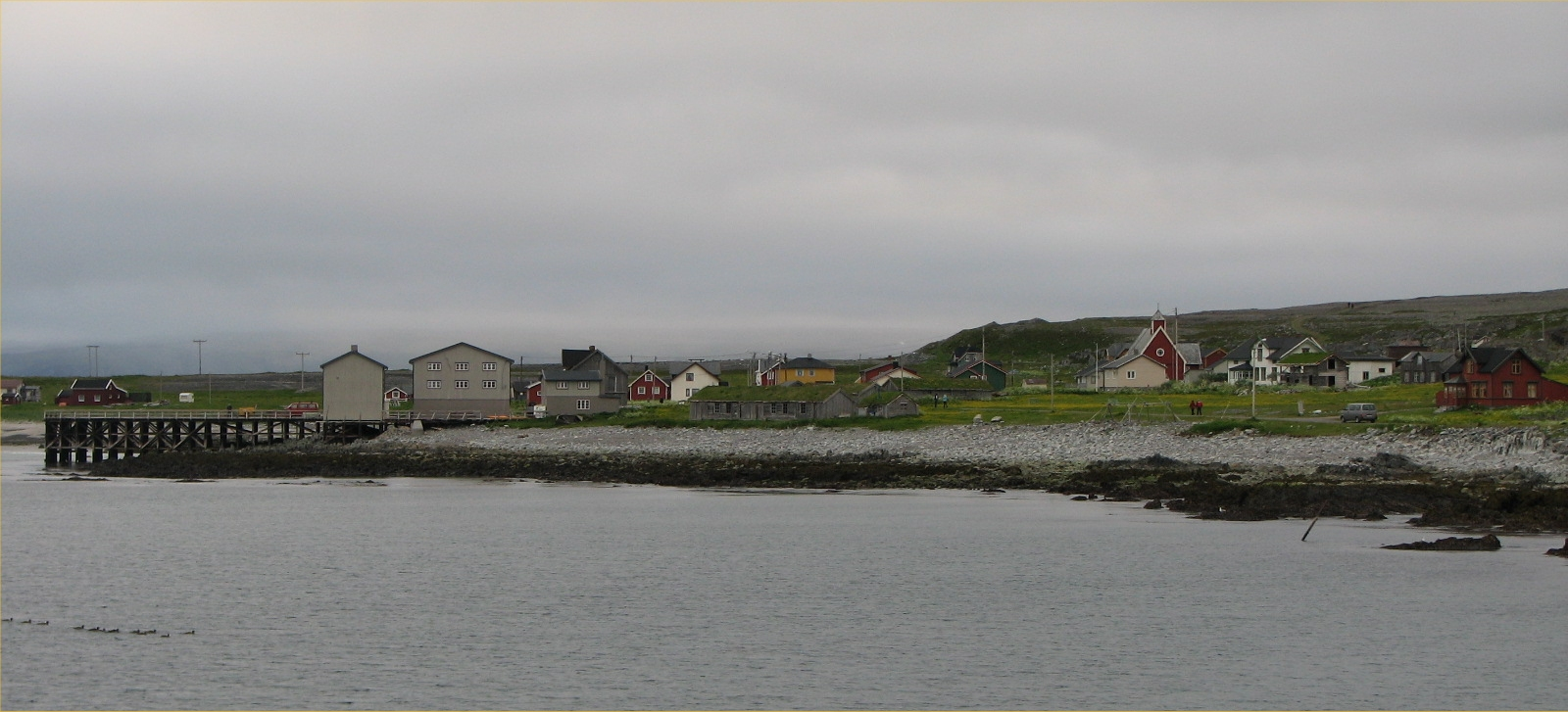
View of the shoreline

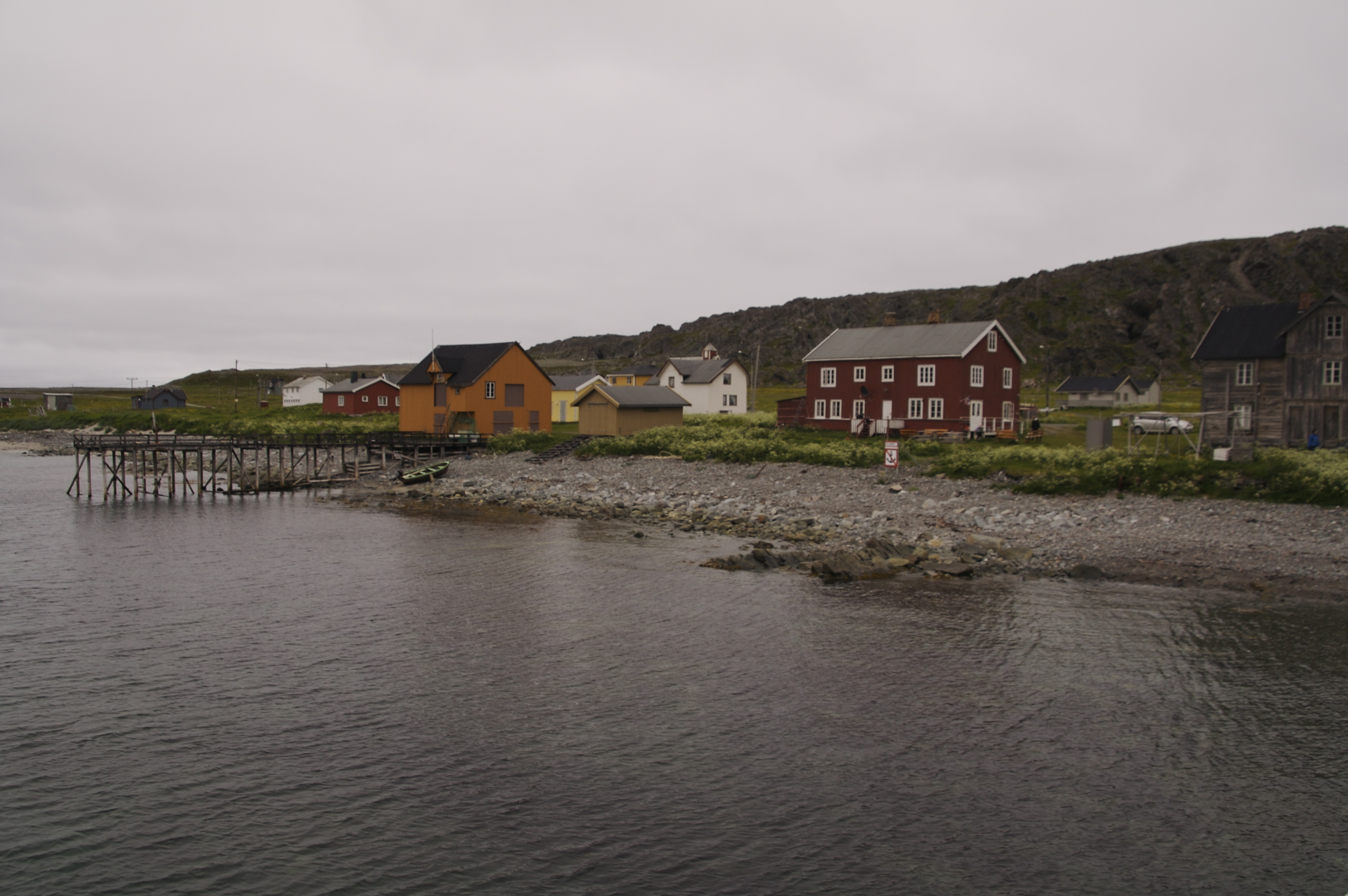
Another view of the shoreline

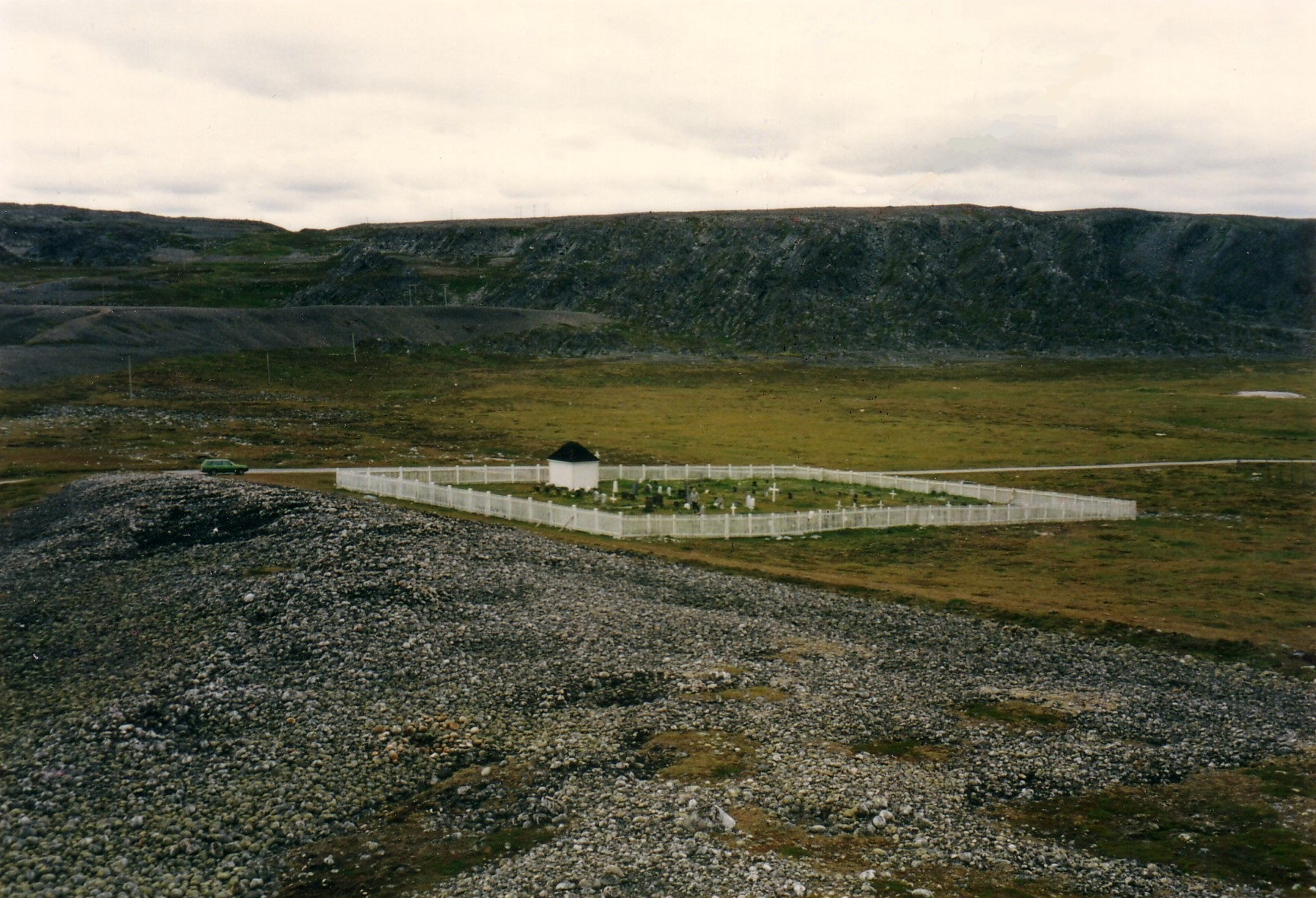
The churchyard in Hamningberg
