= Varangerhalvøya National Park =

National park in Finnmark, Norway

- Varangerhalvøya nasjonalpark (Norwegian); Várnjargga álbmotmeahcci (Northern Sami); Varenkinniemen kansalistaras (Kven)
- IUCN category II (national park)
- Interactive map of Varangerhalvøya National Park
- Location: Finnmark, Norway
- Nearest city: Vadsø
- Coordinates: 70°20′N 29°38′E
- Area: 1,804.1 km^{2} (445,800 acres)
- Established: 2006
- Governing body: Directorate for Nature Management

Varangerhalvøya National Park (Norwegian: Varangerhalvøya nasjonalpark) lies on the Varanger Peninsula in Finnmark county, Norway. It is located in the municipalities of Båtsfjord, Nesseby, Vadsø, and Vardø, in the northeasternmost part of Norway. The peninsula was earlier the largest area within the Arctic climate zone in mainland Norway, but with the 1991-2020 normals, much of the area is now considered to be a boreal climate rather than arctic. Much of the area is still alpine tundra.

== Flora and fauna ==
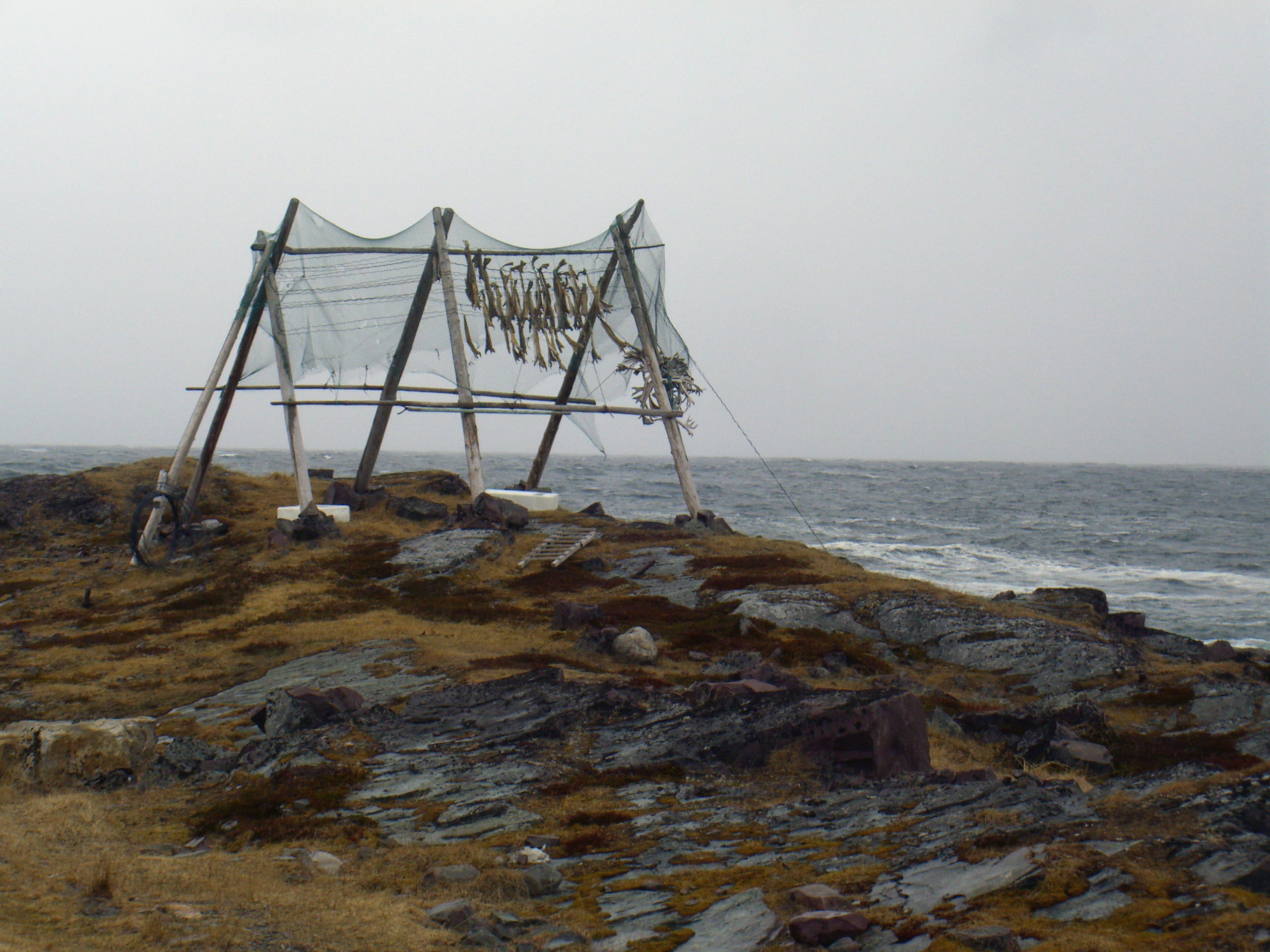
Fish hung out to dry on the peninsula.

Since species from the Arctic, eastern Siberia, and more southerly areas all occur together on the Varanger Peninsula, the plant life is distinctive. The small deciduous woodlands in the area are among the northernmost in the world.

Lime-rich bedrock and soil in the north supports rich pockets containing rare species like Papaver dahlianum (a poppy), field fleawort, Svalbard snow cinquefoil, and Arenaria pseudofrigida (a sandwort).

The peninsula still has a complete alpine ecosystem with reindeer (domesticated), wolverine, and Arctic fox. The latter is the most endangered mammal species of Norway. A special programme based on reducing the number of the dominant red fox has shown very good results (per 2008) for the small Arctic fox population.

=== Important Bird Area ===
An area of about 200,000 hectares (770 mi^{2}) of the peninsula, largely coinciding with the national park, has been designated an Important Bird Area (IBA) by BirdLife International because it supports breeding populations of many birds, including lesser white-fronted geese, long-tailed ducks, common scoters, greater scaups, Eurasian golden plovers, bar-tailed godwits, ruddy turnstones, Temminck's stints, dunlins, purple sandpipers, little stints, red-necked phalaropes, spotted redshanks, long-tailed jaegers, Arctic jaegers, pomarine jaegers, short-eared owls, snowy owls, rough-legged buzzards, gyrfalcons, red-throated pipits, lapland longspurs and snow buntings.

== Name ==
The last element is the finite form of the Norwegian word halvøy which means "peninsula". The meaning of the first part of the name was originally the name of the local fjord now known as the Varangerfjorden (Old Norse: Verangr or Verjanger). The first element is verja which is the plural genitive case of the word which means "fishing village". The last element is angr which means "bay" or "small fjord".
