= Båtsfjorden =

Fjord in Båtsfjord, Norway

Båtsfjorden (Norwegian); Báhcavuonna (Northern Sami)
- Interactive map of: Båtsfjorden (Norwegian); Báhcavuonna (Northern Sami)
- Location: Finnmark county, Norway
- Coordinates: 70.6715°N 29.8301°E
- Type: Fjord
- Basin countries: Norway
- Max. length: 13 kilometres (8.1 mi)
- Settlements: Båtsfjord

Båtsfjorden (Norwegian) or Báhcavuonna (Northern Sami) is a fjord in Båtsfjord Municipality in Finnmark county, Norway. The 13-kilometre (8.1 mi) long fjord cuts into Varanger Peninsula from the north from the Barents Sea. The village of Båtsfjord is located at the innermost end of the fjord.
