= Hamningberg Chapel =

- Hamningberg kapell
- Hamningberg Chapel
- 70.5413857°N 30.6130949°E
- Location: Båtsfjord, Finnmark
- Country: Norway
- Denomination: Church of Norway
- Churchmanship: Evangelical Lutheran

History
- Status: Chapel
- Consecrated: 1949

Architecture
- Functional status: Inactive
- Architect: Sverre Poulsen
- Architectural type: Long church
- Completed: 1949 (77 years ago)

Specifications
- Capacity: 140
- Materials: Wood

Administration
- Diocese: Nord-Hålogaland
- Deanery: Varanger prosti
- Parish: Båtsfjord
- Norwegian Cultural Heritage Site
- Type: Church
- Status: Not protected
- ID: 84475

Hamningberg Chapel (Norwegian: Hamningberg kapell) is a chapel of the Church of Norway in Båtsfjord Municipality in Finnmark county, Norway. It is located in the now-abandoned (uninhabited) village of Hamningberg. It was an annex chapel for the Båtsfjord parish which is part of the Varanger prosti (deanery) in the Diocese of Nord-Hålogaland. The small, red, wooden chapel was built in a long church style in 1949 by the architect Sverre Poulsen. The church seats about 140 people.

The chapel is no longer regularly used, since the village is no longer inhabited. The area still is used for vacationers in the summer, and the chapel is occasionally used for special events.

== Media gallery ==
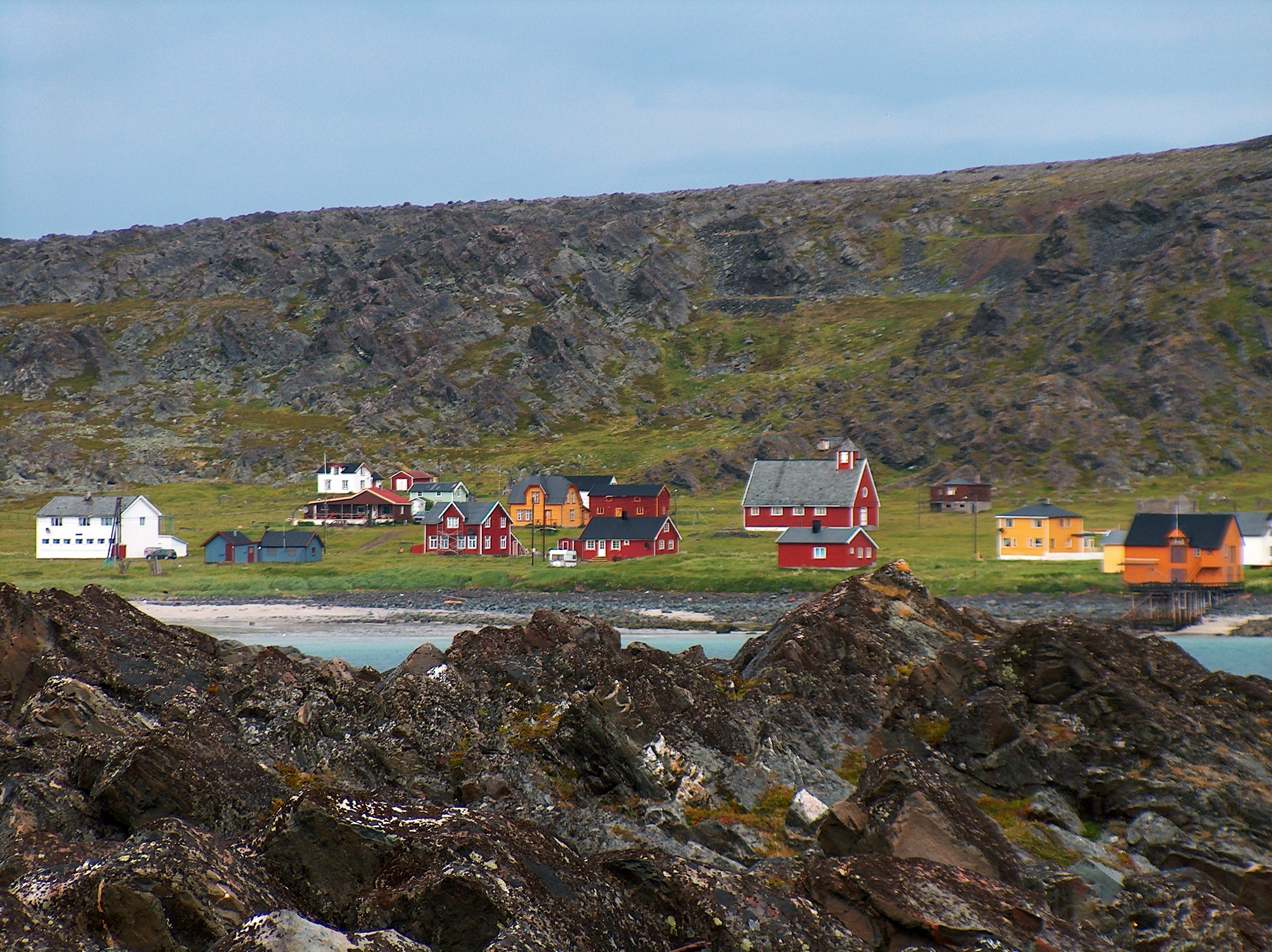
View of the village and the chapel

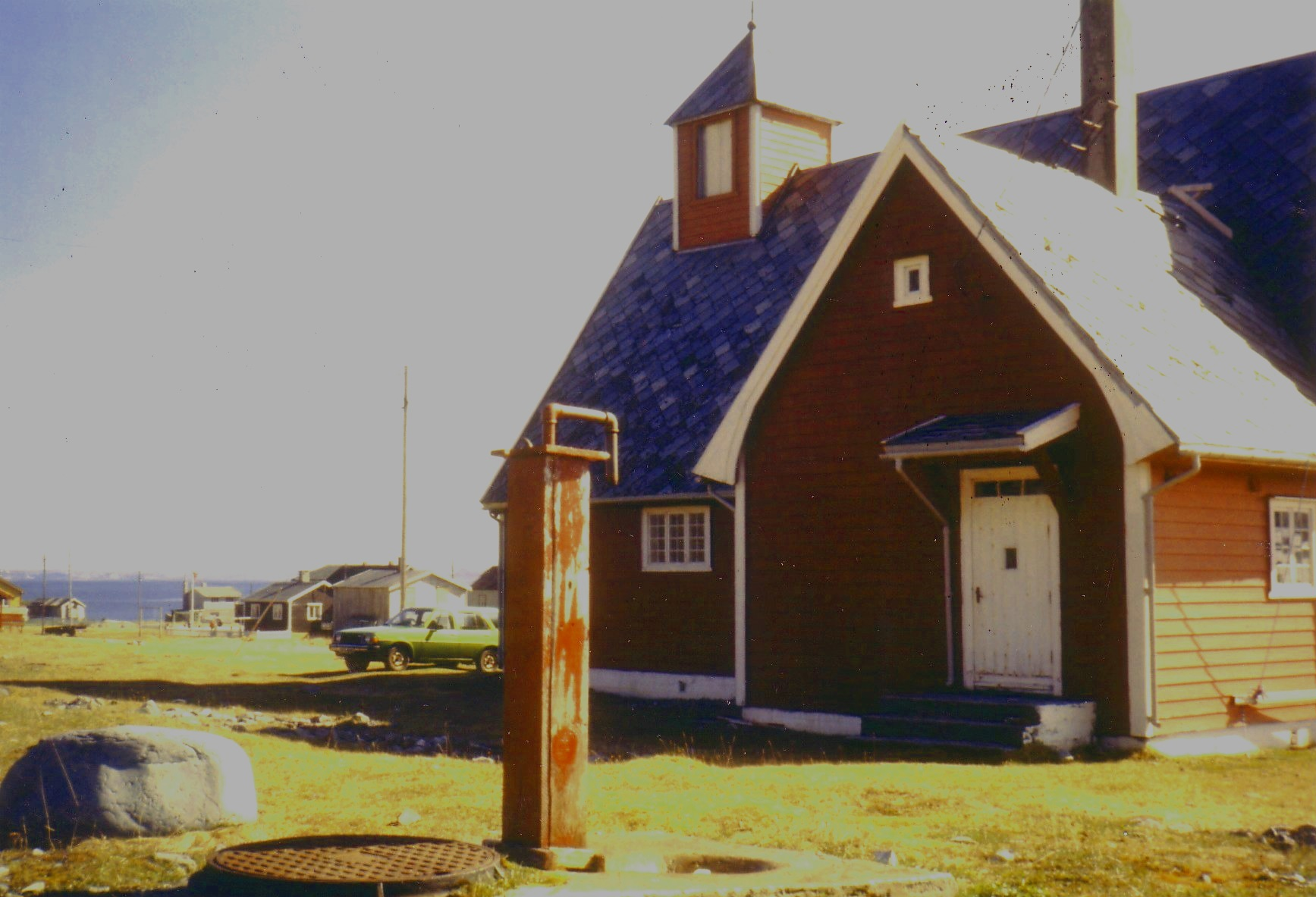
Chapel exterior

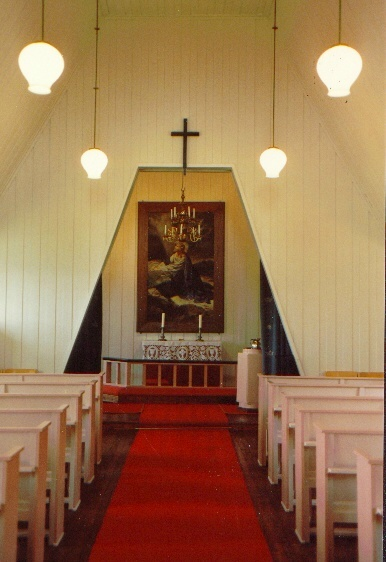
Chapel interior

== See also ==
- List of churches in Nord-Hålogaland
