= Båtsfjord Church =

Church in Finnmark, Norway

- Båtsfjord kirke
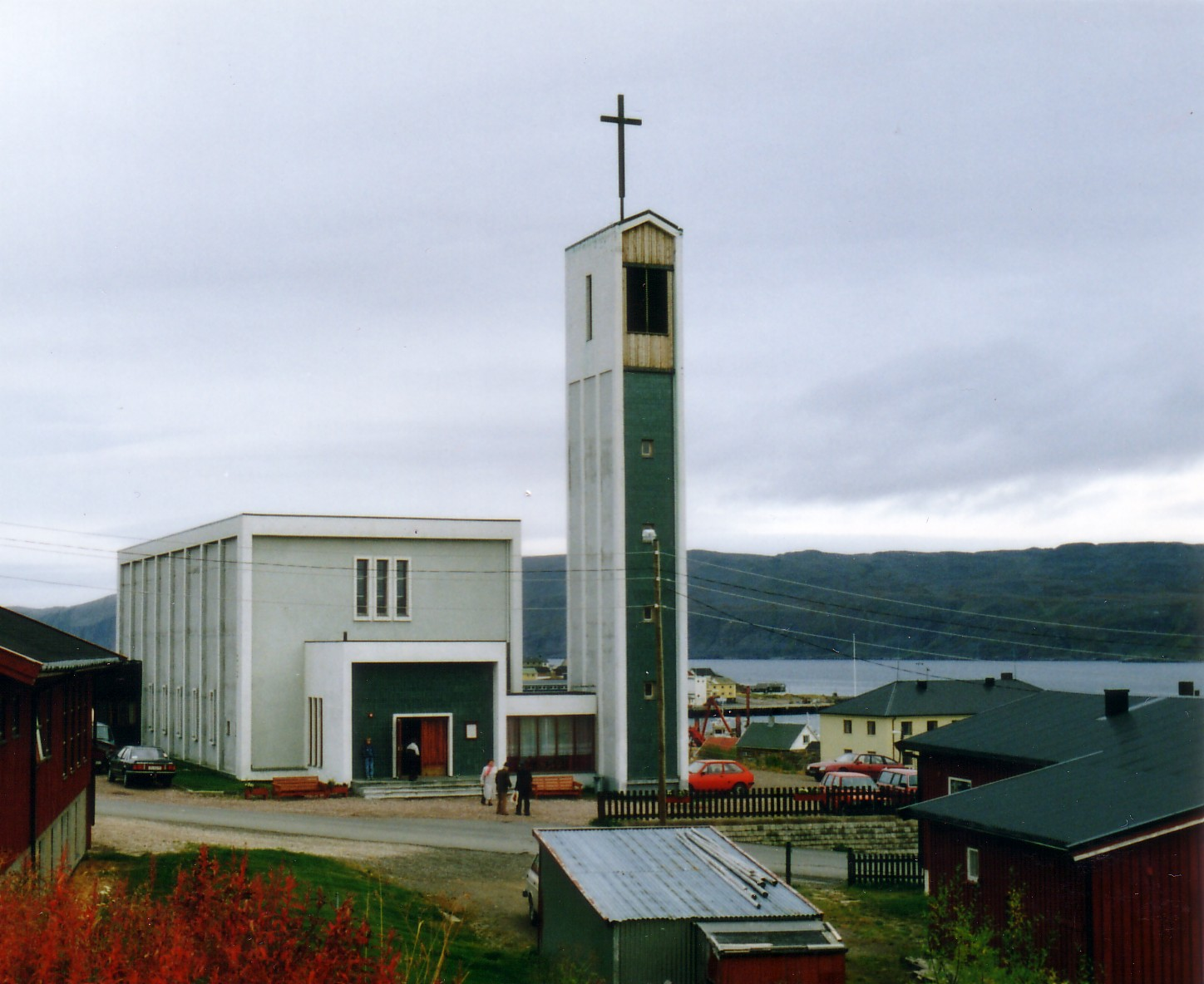
- View of the church
- Båtsfjord Church
- 70.635259°N 29.7175482°E
- Location: Båtsfjord, Finnmark
- Country: Norway
- Denomination: Church of Norway
- Churchmanship: Evangelical Lutheran

History
- Status: Parish church
- Founded: 1971
- Consecrated: 1971

Architecture
- Functional status: Active
- Architect: Hans Magnus
- Architectural type: Long church
- Completed: 1971 (55 years ago)

Specifications
- Capacity: 300
- Materials: Brick

Administration
- Diocese: Nord-Hålogaland
- Deanery: Varanger prosti
- Parish: Båtsfjord
- Norwegian Cultural Heritage Site
- Type: Church
- Status: Not protected
- ID: 84005

Båtsfjord Church (Norwegian: Båtsfjord kirke) is a parish church of the Church of Norway in Båtsfjord Municipality in Finnmark county, Norway. It is located in the village of Båtsfjord. It is the main church for the Båtsfjord parish which is part of the Varanger prosti (deanery) in the Diocese of Nord-Hålogaland. The modern, brick church was built in a long church style in 1971 using plans drawn up by the architect Hans Magnus. The church seats about 300 people.

== Media gallery ==
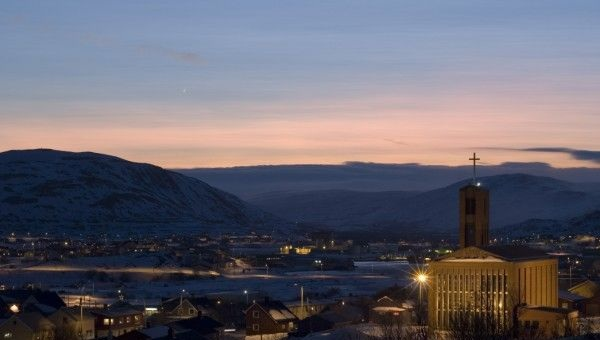
View of Båtsfjord Church within Båtsfjord

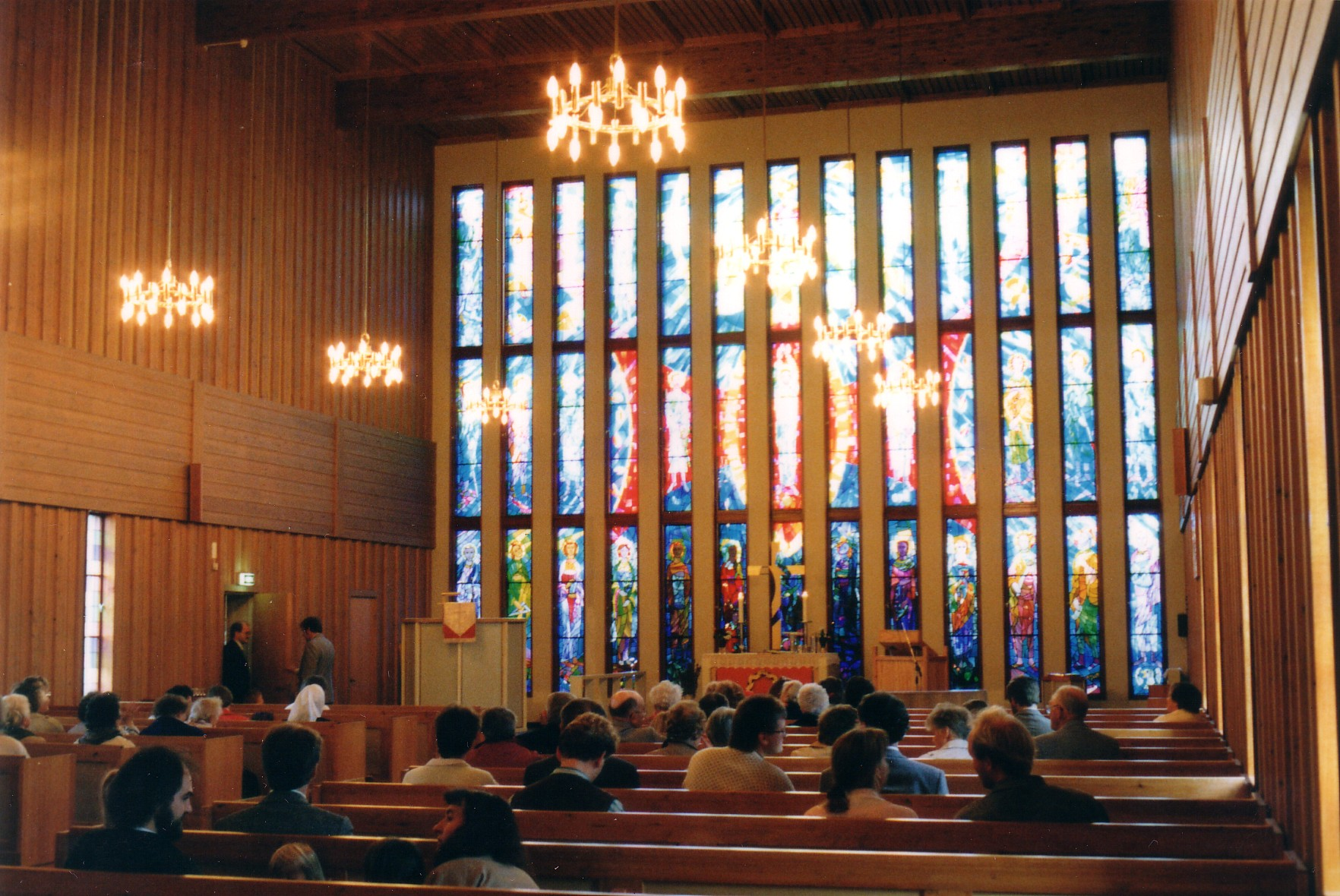
Inside Båtsfjord Church, facing the altar and the stained glass church windows.

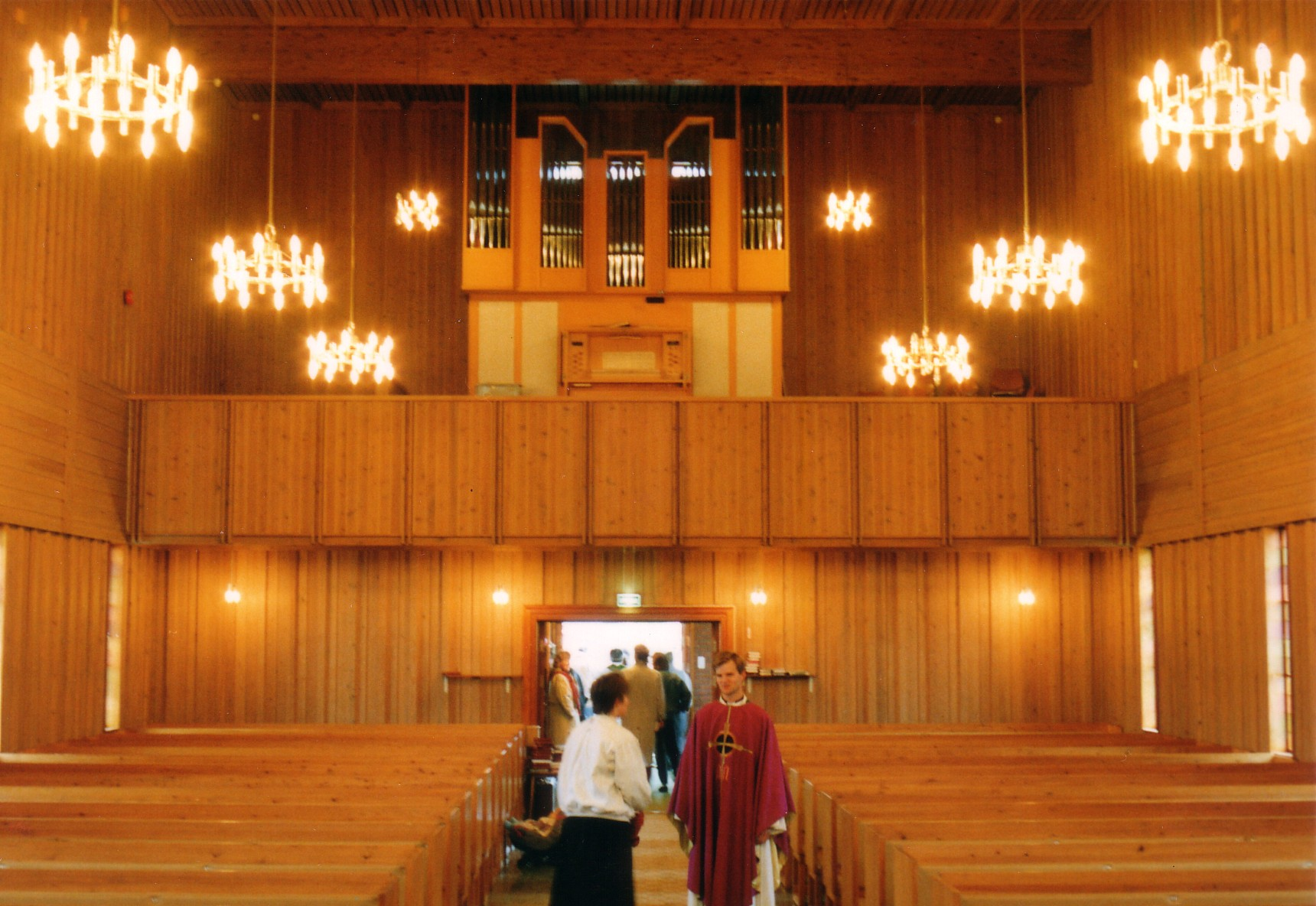
Inside Båtsfjord Church, facing the church organ and the public entrance/exit.

== See also ==
- List of churches in Nord-Hålogaland
