= Geir Knutsen =

Norwegian politician (born 1959)

Geir Knutsen (born 30 June 1959) is a Norwegian politician for the Labour Party.

He served as a deputy representative to the Norwegian Parliament from Finnmark during the term 2005–2009. In total he met during 3 days of parliamentary session.

On the local level he is a member of the municipal council of Båtsfjord Municipality. He also served as mayor there from 2003 to 2007 and again from 2011 to 2019.
