= Båtsfjord Airport =

Airport in Båtsfjord, Finnmark, Norway

Båtsfjord Airport Båtsfjord lufthavn

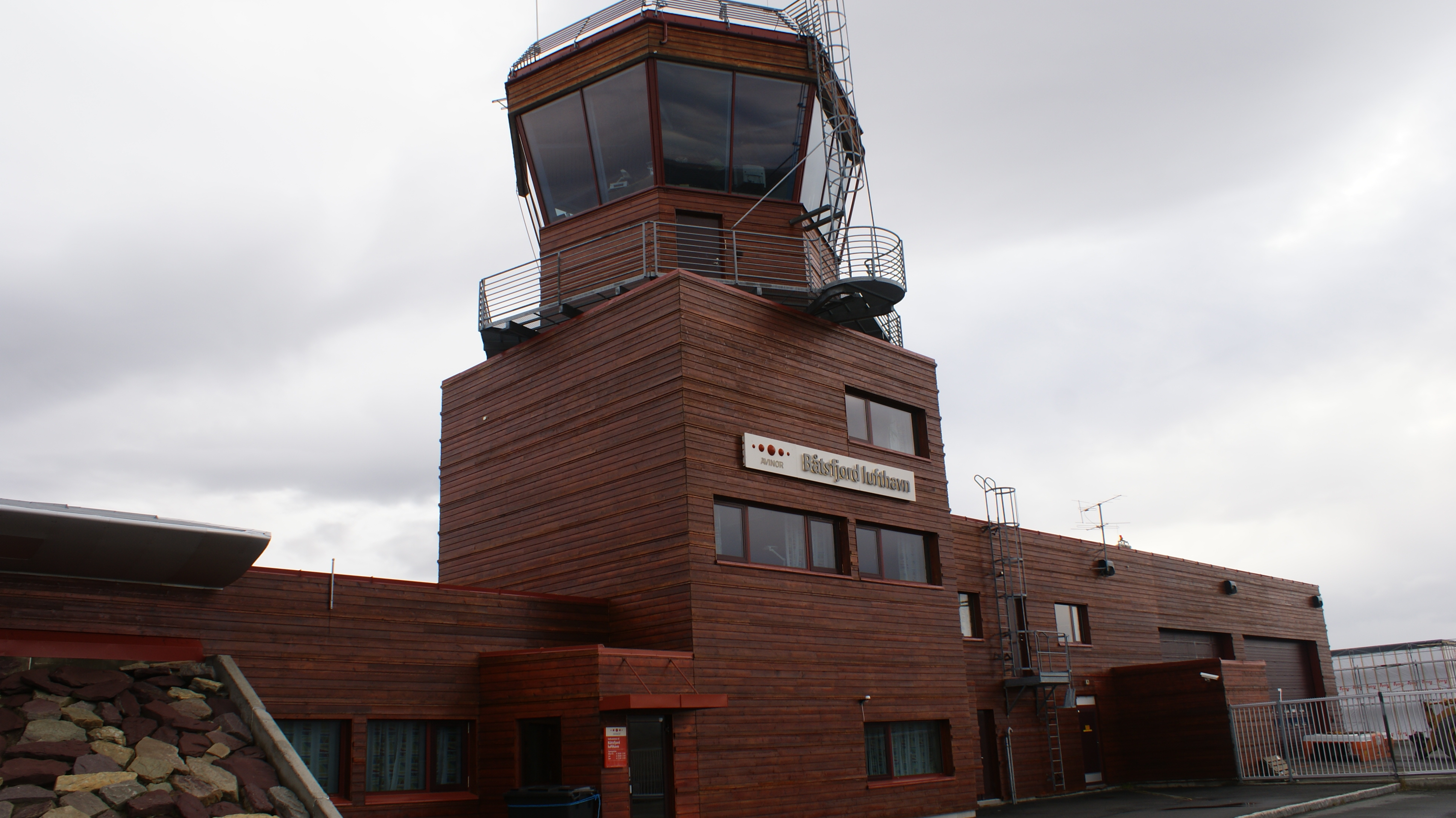
- IATA: BJF; ICAO: ENBS

Summary
- Airport type: Public
- Operator: Avinor
- Serves: Båtsfjord
- Location: Båtsfjord Municipality, Norway
- Elevation AMSL: 149 m / 490 ft
- Coordinates: 70°36′01″N 029°41′34″E
- Website: avinor.no

Map

Runways
Direction	Length		Surface
Direction	m	ft	Surface
03/21	1,000	3,281	Asphalt

Statistics (2016)
- Passengers: 14,485
- Aircraft movements: 2,551
- Cargo (tonnes): 3

Båtsfjord Airport (Norwegian: Båtsfjord lufthavn, IATA: BJF, ICAO: ENBS) is a regional airport serving Båtsfjord Municipality in Finnmark county, Norway. It consists of a 1,000 by 30 meters (3,281 by 98 ft) runway and served 14,485 passengers in 2016. A further 14,663 landed and started at the airport without leaving the aircraft. Scheduled services are provided by Widerøe using the Dash 8 to Kirkenes, Hammerfest and other communities in Finnmark. The airport is owned and operated by the state-owned Avinor.

It is the second airport in Båtsfjord. The first was built in 1973, but only had a gravel runway. When Widerøe replaced their smaller de Havilland Canada Twin Otters (19-20 seats) with the Dash 8 (39 seats), a new airport was needed to serve Båtsfjord. The new airport cost 178 million Norwegian krone and opened on 9 September 1999.

== History ==
The first airline to operate to Båtsfjord was Varangfly, later renamed Norving, who flew seaplane taxi and ambulance flights in the early 1960s. Construction of an airfield in Båtsfjorddalen was started by the aviation club Båtsfjord Flyklubb in 1972 and completed in May 1973. It consisted of an 800-meter (2,600 ft) gravel runway and was served with regular flights by Norving. The municipality took over ownership of the airport in 1976. Norving remained the sole operator until 1990, when the routes were taken over by Widerøe using the Twin Otter.

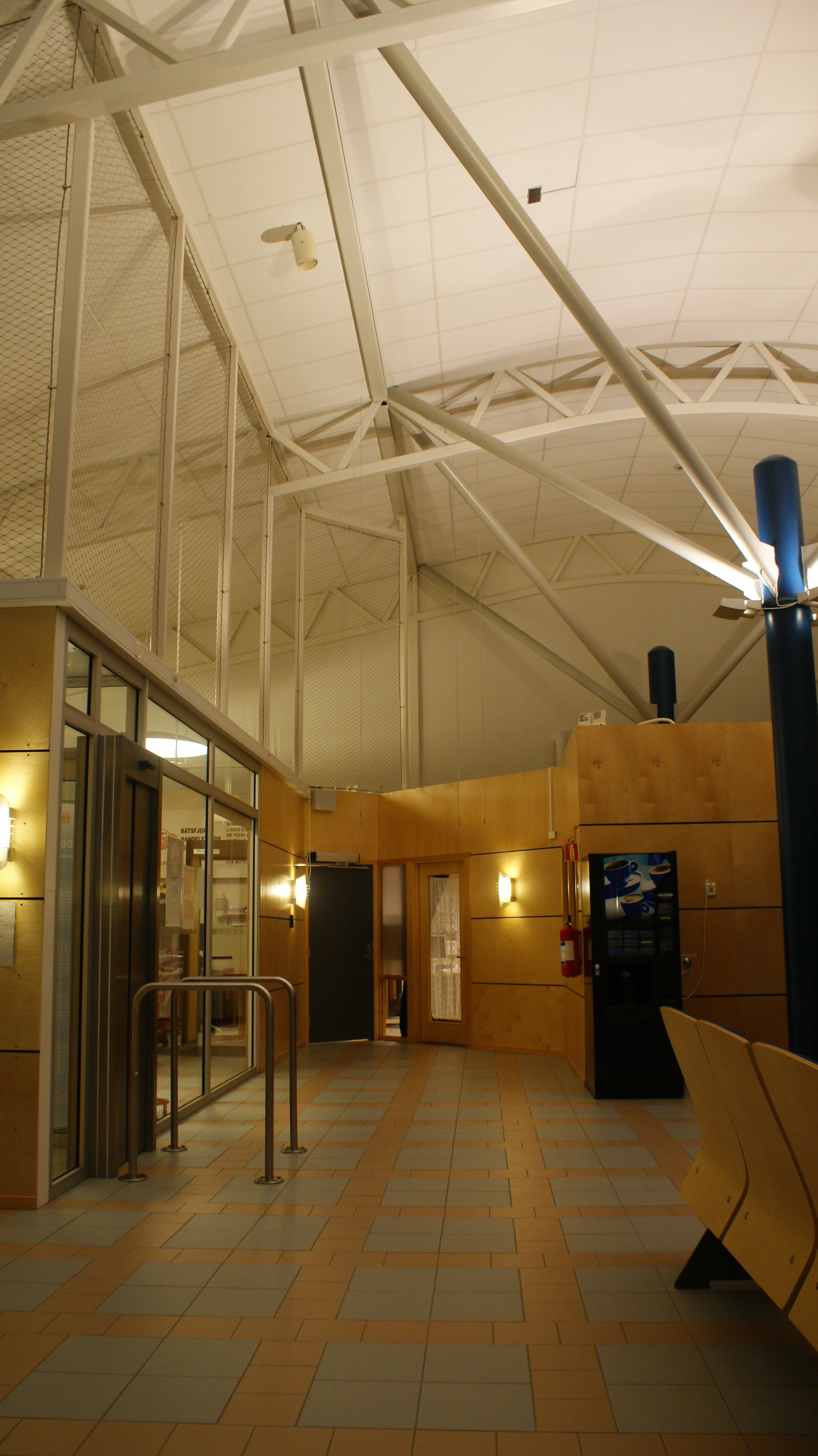
Departures hall with the winged-shaped curve of the roof visible

The Ministry of Transport and Communications announced in February 1993 that they were considering taking over ownership and operations of the airport through the Civil Aviation Administration (CAA, later renamed Avinor). In December, Widerøe articulated that Båtsfjord Airport did not meet the demands for future operation as it lacked proper navigational aids and an asphalt runway. Widerøe stated that with the introduction of the Dash 8, which would be phased in between 1993 and 1995, they would no longer be able to serve the airport. The CAA stated, instead, that the new airport should be built, estimated to cost between 70 and 80 million Norwegian krone (NOK). The main reason was that the former airport was poorly located in relation to the terrain, being located in a valley. In April 1994 the ministry stated that they were considering closing many of the smallest regional airports, including Båtsfjord.

In April 1995, when Parliament decided to nationalize twenty-six regional airports owned by their respective municipalities, they also debated a proposal to build a new airport in Båtsfjord. At the time Widerøe was obliged to operate routes to the airport until 31 March 1997. In December 1995, Widerøe took delivery of their fifteenth Dash 8 and thus their only need for a Twin Otter was to serve Båtsfjord. From 1994 to 1997, the cost estimates for the new airport increased from NOK 95 to 125 million. By June 1998, Parliament approved additional funding which brought the cost to NOK 178 million, including a new county road for NOK 8 million. The airport opened on 9 September 1999. From the opening Widerøe used the Twin Otter until 1 April 2000, when the route was taken over by larger Dash 8 aircraft. Airport security was introduced on 1 January 2005.

Avinor sees a problem in getting new aircraft of the size of the Dash 8-100 which can use the 800 meter runways, so they plan to use smaller planes with 19 seats for these small airports when the Dash 8-100 retire before 2030.

== Facilities ==
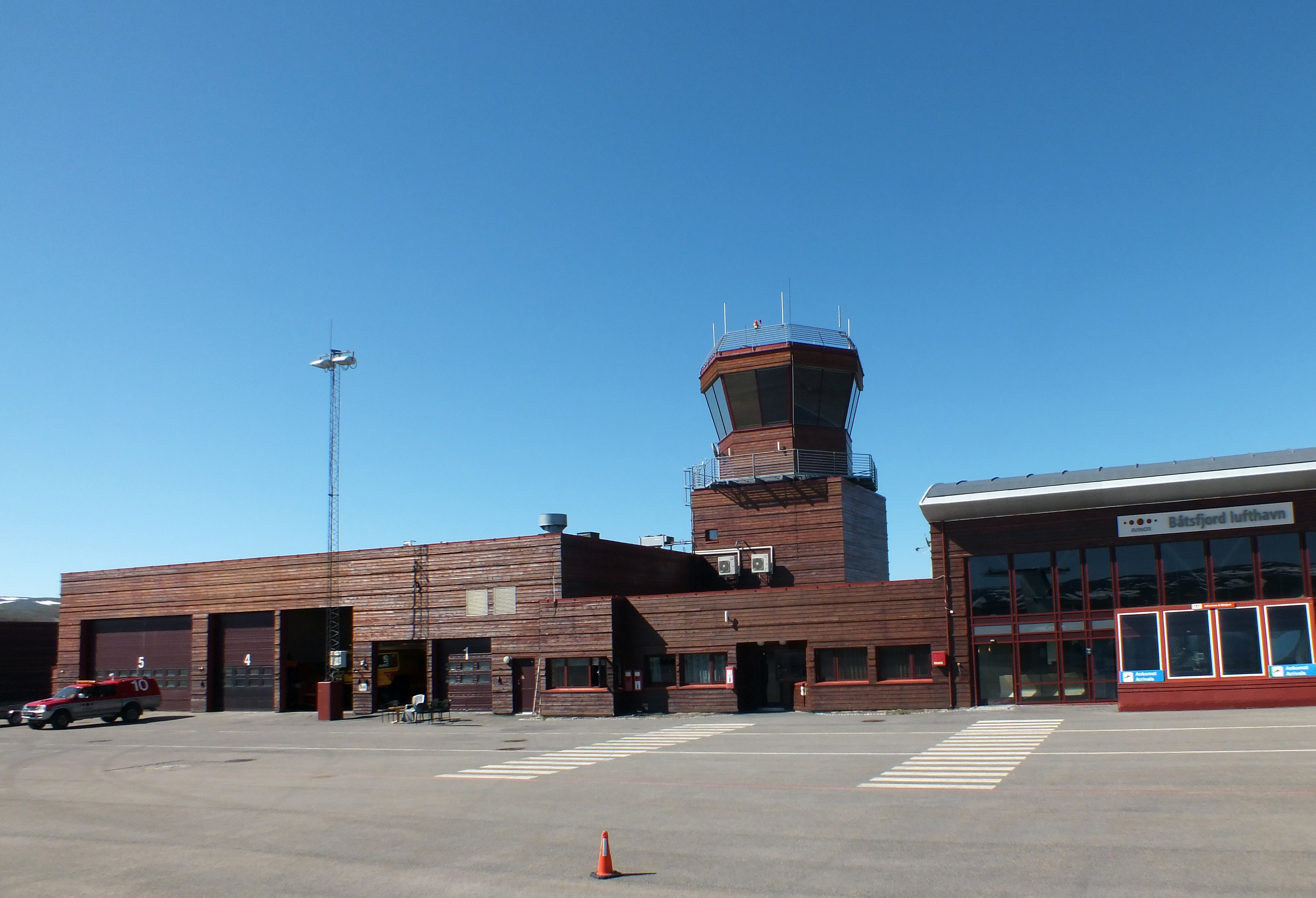
Airport air side

The terminal consists of a single building, with an integrated control tower, capable of handling 120 passengers per hour. The facade is covered in Russian larch; the focus on wood as a dominant material was common for Norwegian architecture the 1990s, and is also seen at Oslo Airport, Gardermoen (opened in 1998) and for the venues of the 1994 Winter Olympics. The terminal was designed by Alta-based architect Solveig Thorsen and is shaped like an aircraft wing, similar to the terminal building at Gardermoen. There is a single gate at the airport, which prior to the installation of security control was 17 steps from the entrance.

The airport resides at an elevation of 149 meters (489 ft) above mean sea level. The runway is designated 03–21, with an asphalt surface measuring 1,000 by 30 meters (3,281 by 98 ft). SCAT-I, a Global Positioning System-based landing system, is under deployment. It is possible to extend the runway to 1,200 meters (3,900 ft) if desirable in the future. The tarmac has space for three simultaneous aircraft. The airport is located ten minutes' drive (7 km/4 mi) from the town center. There are taxis, paid parking and car rental available, but no bus service.

== Airlines and destinations ==
All services from the airport are operated by Widerøe with 39-seat Dash-8-100 aircraft. All routes, though not necessarily direct, fly to either Kirkenes Airport, Høybuktmoen, Hammerfest Airport or Tromsø Airport. The routes from Båtsfjord are operated on a public service obligation with the Ministry of Transport and Communications. The airport served 12,363 passengers, 2,494 aircraft movements and handled 3 tons of cargo in 2012. The airport operated with a deficit of NOK 20 million in 2012.

Airlines	Destinations
Widerøe	Alta, Berlevåg, Hammerfest, Honningsvåg, Kirkenes, Mehamn, Tromsø, Vadsø, Vardø

== Statistics ==
Annual passenger traffic
Year	Passengers	% Change
2025	18,891	▼ -9.2%
2024	20,803	▼ -28.9%
2023	29,249	▲14.2%
2022	25,620	▼ -3.9%
2021	26,659	▲34.3%
2020	19,847	▼ -25.0%
2019	26,476	▼ -3.3%
2018	27,390	▼ -3.8%
2017	28,474	▼ -2.3%
2016	29,148	▲9.0%
2015	26,732	
