= Båtsfjord (village) =

Båtsfjord: Båtsfjord (Norwegian); Báhcavuonna (Northern Sami)
- Village
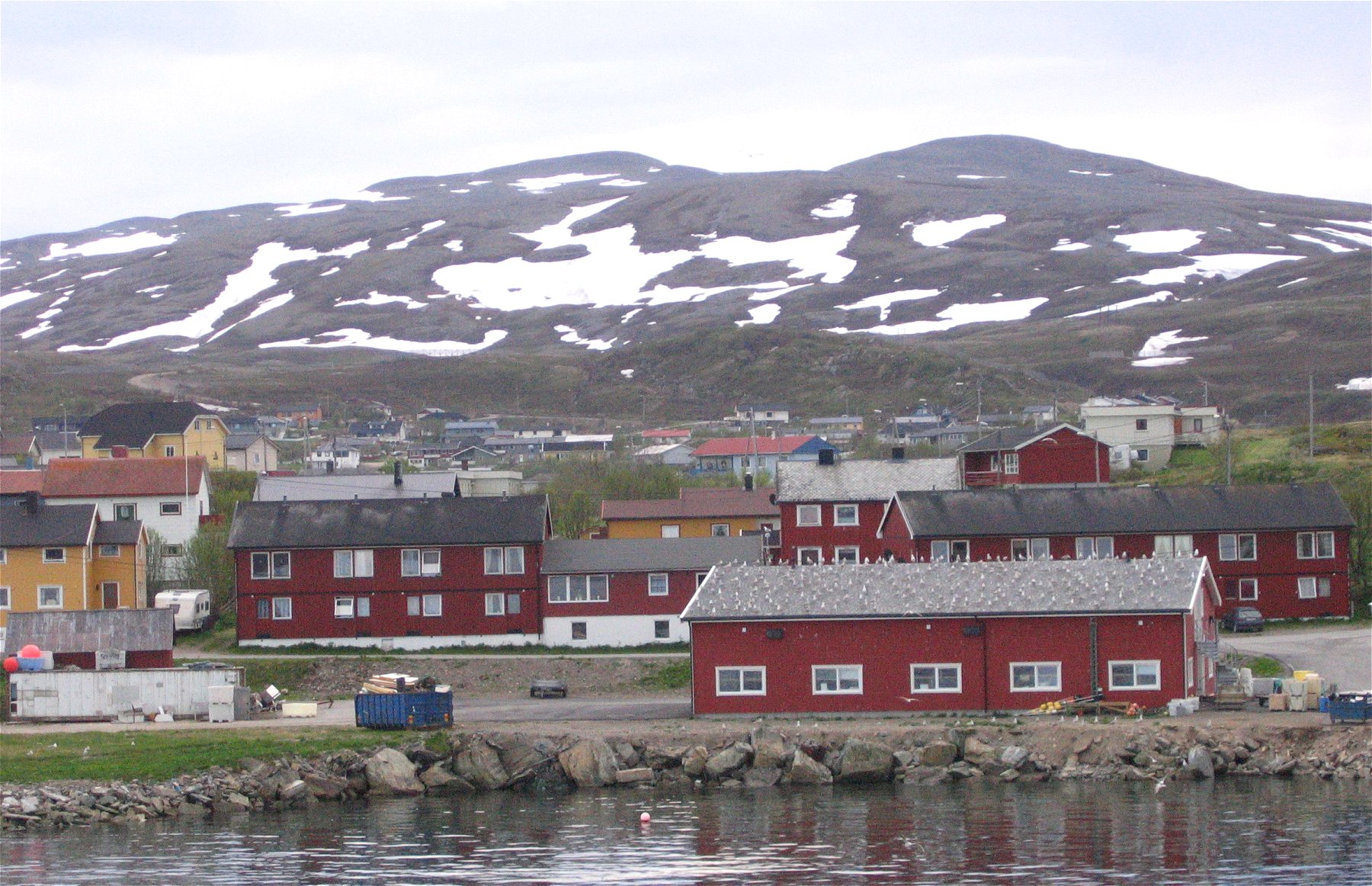
- View of the village
- Interactive map of Båtsfjord
- Location within Finnmark Location within Norway
- Coordinates: 70°38′04″N 29°43′06″E
- Country: Norway
- Region: Northern Norway
- County: Finnmark
- District: Øst-Finnmark
- Municipality: Båtsfjord Municipality

Area
  - Total: 1.44 km^{2} (0.56 sq mi)
- Elevation: 13 m (43 ft)

Population (2023)
  - Total: 2,105
  - Density: 1,462/km^{2} (3,790/sq mi)
- Time zone: UTC+01:00 (CET)
  - Summer (DST): UTC+02:00 (CEST)
- Post Code: 9990 Båtsfjord

Båtsfjord (Norwegian) or Báhcavuonna (Northern Sami) is the administrative centre of Båtsfjord Municipality in Finnmark county, Norway. The fishing village is located along the 13-kilometre (8.1 mi) long Båtsfjorden, an inlet from the Barents Sea, along the northern coast of the Varanger Peninsula. The village sits at the northern end of Norwegian County Road 891. The Båtsfjord Airport lies just south of the village. The Hurtigruten coastal express has regular stops at Båtsfjord.

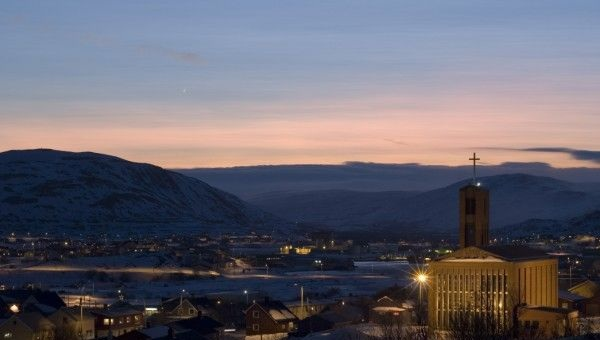
View of the village at night

The 1.44-square-kilometre (360-acre) village has a population of 2,095 per Q3 2025, which gives the village a population density of 1,456 inhabitants per square kilometre (3,770/sq mi). The village is home to over 99% of all the residents in the entire municipality (there are 2,095 residents in Båtsfjord Municipality per Q3 2025).

Båtsfjord is one of the biggest fishing ports in Finnmark County with around 10,000 boat arrivals each year. The village also has a number of facilities for fish processing.

Båtsfjord has shopping facilities, a post office, a school, and Båtsfjord Church.

== History ==
Historically, there were three whaling stations in Båtsfjord, but they are no longer in operation.
