= Varanger Peninsula =

Peninsula in Finnmark county, Norway

Varanger Peninsula: Varangerhalvøya (Norwegian); Várnjárga (Northern Sami); Varenkinniemi (Kven)
- Peninsula
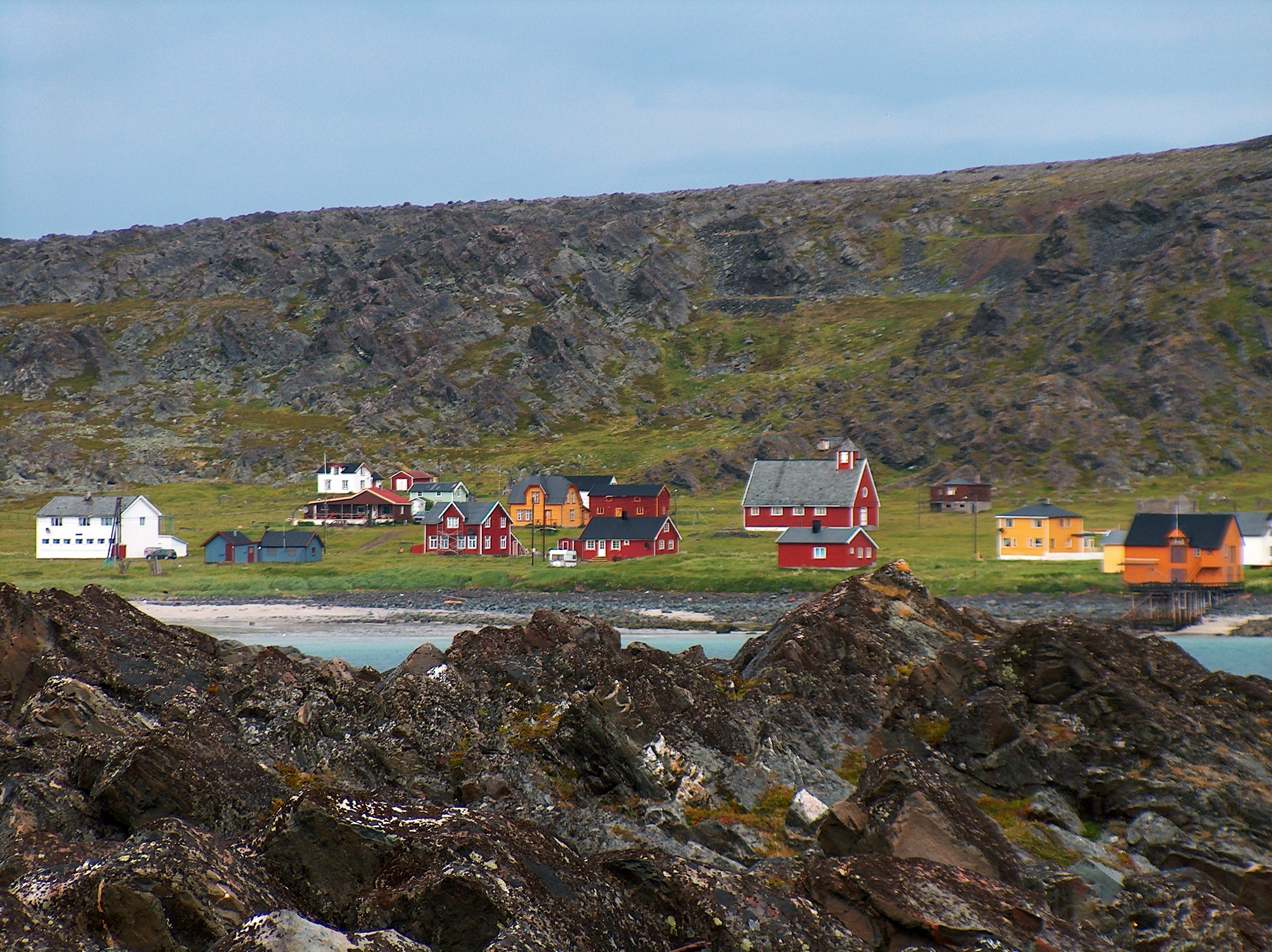
- Hamningberg in Båtsfjord Municipality is an abandoned fishing village on the northern coast of the peninsula
- Interactive map of the peninsula
- Coordinates: 70°29′01″N 29°32′26″E
- Location: Finnmark, Norway
- Offshore water bodies: Barents Sea, Tanafjorden, Varangerfjorden

The Varanger Peninsula (Norwegian: Varangerhalvøya; Northern Sami: Várnjárga; Kven: Varenkinniemi) is a peninsula in Finnmark county, Norway. It is located in the northeasternmost part of Norway, along the Barents Sea. The peninsula has the Tanafjorden to the west, the Varangerfjorden to the south, and the Barents Sea to the north and east. The municipalities of Vadsø, Båtsfjord, Berlevåg, Vardø, Tana, and Nesseby share the 2,069-square-kilometre (799 sq mi) peninsula. Nesseby and Tana are only partially on the peninsula, with the rest being entirely on the peninsula. The Varangerhalvøya National Park protects most of the land on the peninsula.

== Geography ==
The area has rugged mountain terrain with altitudes of up to 633 metres (2,077 ft). Much of the relief of the peninsula is a paleic surface similar to the one found in the highlands of southern Norway. In the peninsula the paleic surface is made up of an undulating plateau between the altitudes of 200 and 600 m.a.s.l. The higher parts of the undulating plateau are made up by erosion-resistant rocks like quartzite. The lower parts are made up by weak rocks like shale and mudstone. At intermediate levels sandstone is common. Some parts of the paleic surface in Varanger Peninsula are a re-exposed unconformity that underlie sedimentary rock of Vendian (Late Neoproterozoic) age. The paleic surface might have been uplifted as much as 200–250 meters since middle Pliocene times.

Landforms resulting from Quaternary periglaciation are recurrent across the peninsula. Among the most common are block fields and solifluction lobes. Blockfields are most extensive on the northern half of the peninsula, chiefly in the plateau area. Polygonal ground is found in some places, but there are no known modern ice wedges. Permafrost was as of 1985 only known from bogs, and in a few places this permafrost had originated thermokarst depressions.

=== Geology ===
The peninsula gave its name to the Varangian glaciation episode. It is largely composed of Neoproterozoic to Paleozoic sedimentary rocks, locally overlying crystalline basement of the Baltic Shield. Two ancient fault systems divide the geology of the peninsula into three groups, where the NE side of the peninsula (North Varanger region) is separated from the SW by the Trollfjord-Komagelva strike-slip fault, and the SW side is divided approximately NNE-SSW by thrusting of the Scandinavian Caledonides over the Baltic Shield.

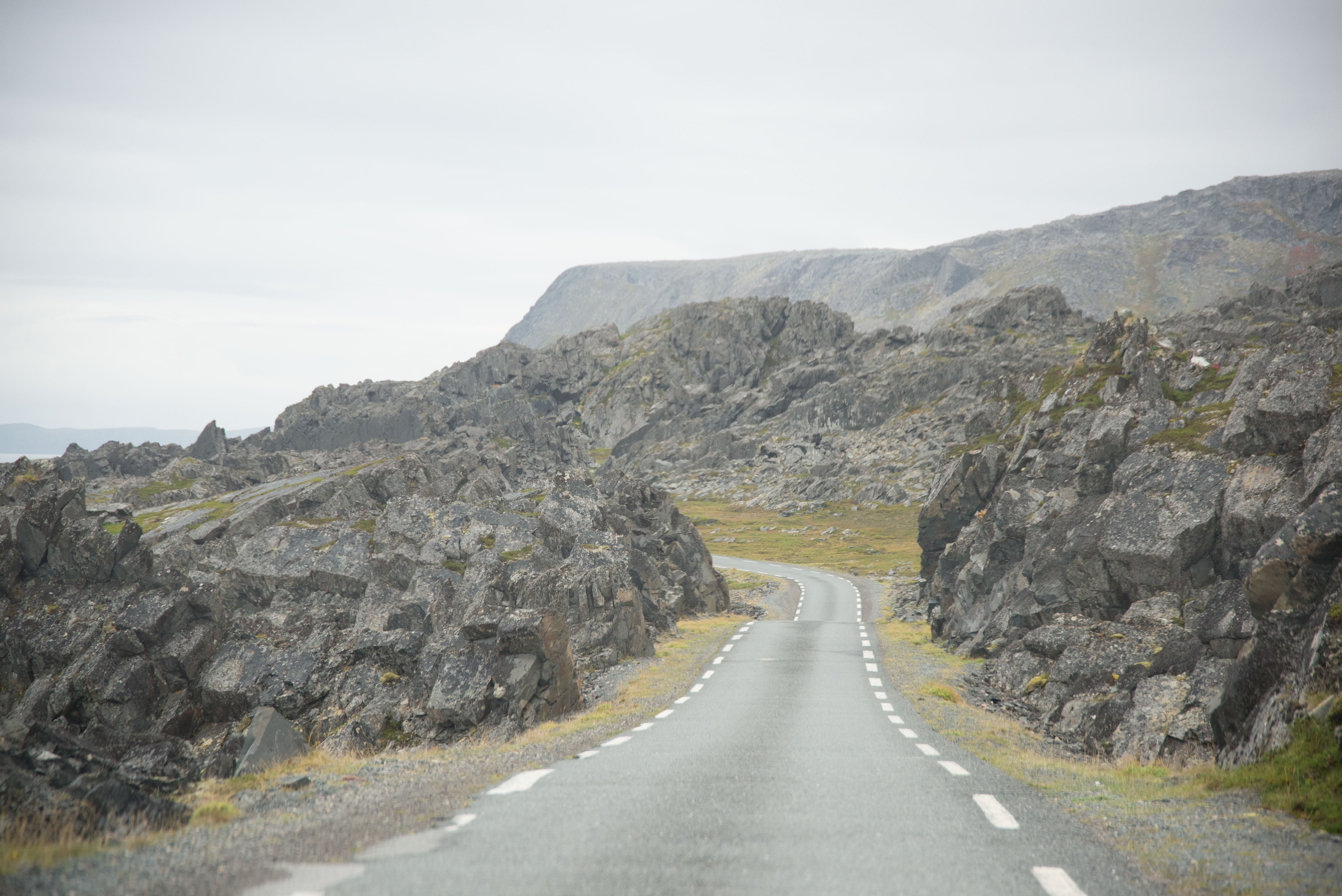
Outcrops of the Båsnæring Formation on Fv 341.

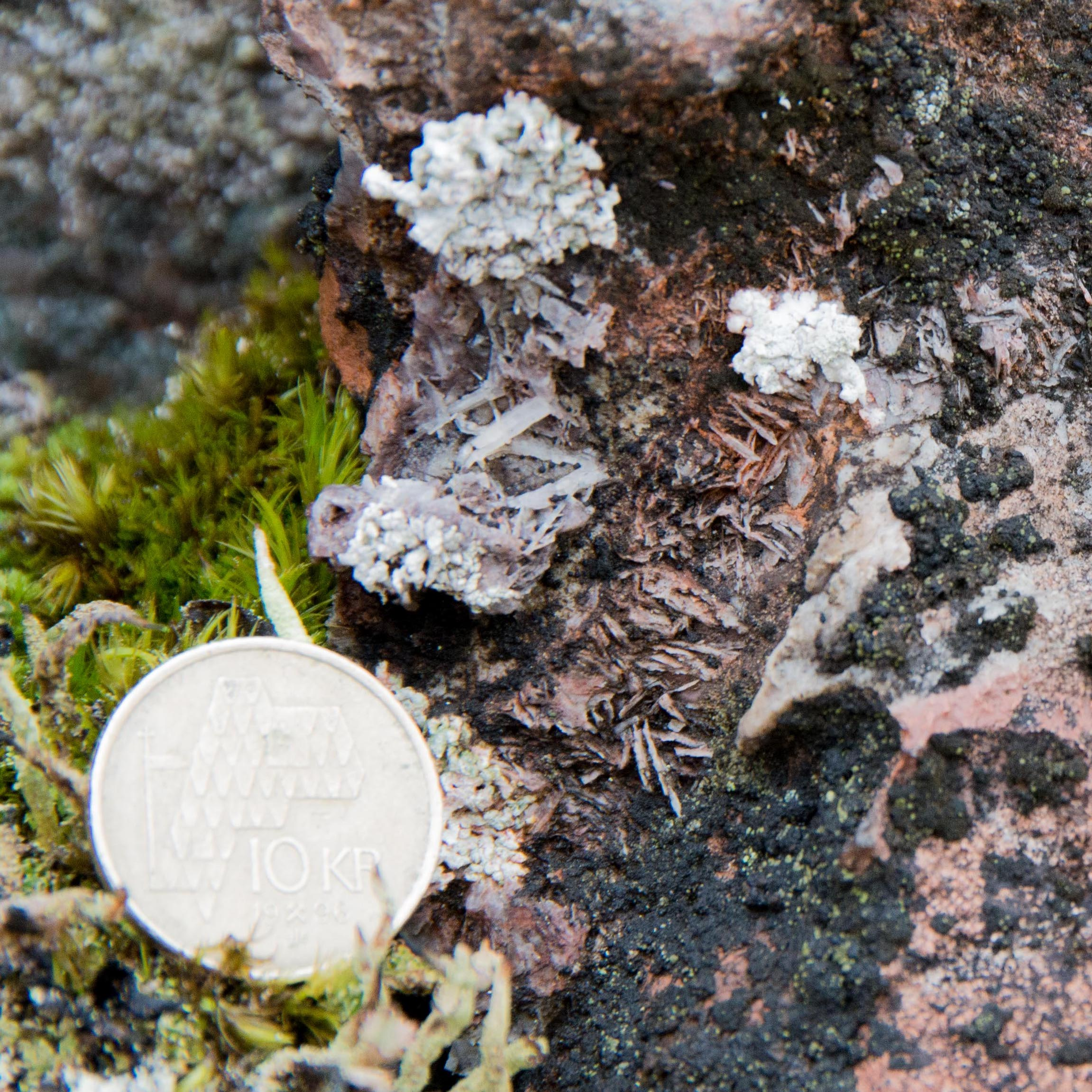
Barite crystals in the Smalfjord Formation (The diameter of the coin is 24 mm.)

In the North Varanger region, sedimentary rocks were deposited during the Tonian/early-mid Cryogenian (Barents Sea Group), followed by a depositional hiatus that lasted until the late Ediacaran, when the Løkvifjell Group was deposited. Notable strata of the Barents Sea Group are the Kongsfjord and Båsnæring formations, which form prominent ridges and cliffs along the Fv341 road. Outcrops of the overlying Båtsfjord Formation are generally not as prominent, but are notable for containing molar tooth structures, as well as teepee structures, desiccation cracks, flaser bedding, and other sedimentary structures that indicate deposition in an inter-tidal, intermittently exposed environment. Stable carbon isotope ratio chemostratigraphy has been used to correlate the Annijokka Member of the Båtsfjord Formation with other Neoproterozoic successions around the world, suggesting it was deposited approximately 811 million years ago, during the Bitter Springs carbon isotope excursion.

Strata deposited on the SW half of the Varanger Peninsula mostly formed during the mid-late Cryogenian, Ediacaran, and Paleozoic. Notably, this includes glacial diamictite sedimentary rocks that formed during the Marinoan 'Snowball Earth' (Smalfjord Formation of the Vestertana Group), and the overlying 'cap carbonate' of the Nyborg Formation (Vestertana Group). Small outcrops of barite crystals related to 'Snowball Earth' deglaciation are found locally on outcrops of the Baltic Shield.

=== Climate ===
A part of the peninsula, including the town of Vardø (located on an island just off the coast of the peninsula), earlier had an Arctic tundra climate but with the updated 1991-2020 climate normals, this is mostly gone. However, much of the peninsula is at some altitude and are alpine tundra. On the south coast, including the town of Vadsø, there is sufficient summer heat for birch trees to grow.

=== Fauna ===
Arctic fox exist, and 79 cubs were registered in 2023.

The Norwegian Directorate for Nature Management has a project on the peninsula for the reintroduction and protection of the Arctic fox, which is critically endangered on the Norwegian mainland. In addition to introducing animals into nature, the larger and stronger red fox is hunted down.

There are many species of sea birds along the coast of the peninsula; some arctic species of birds spend the winters along the coast of the peninsula.

== Media gallery ==
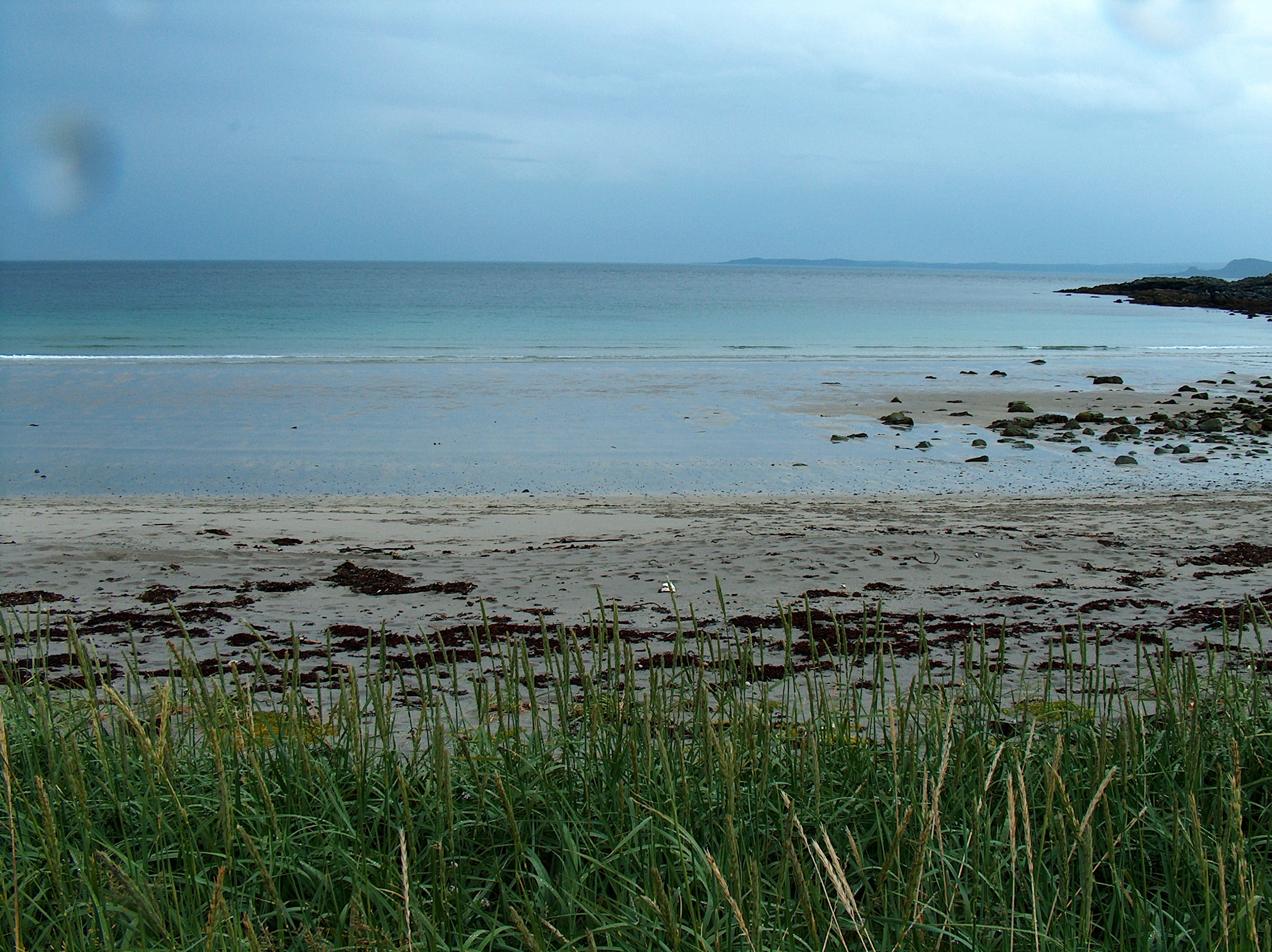
The Arctic beach at Hamningberg

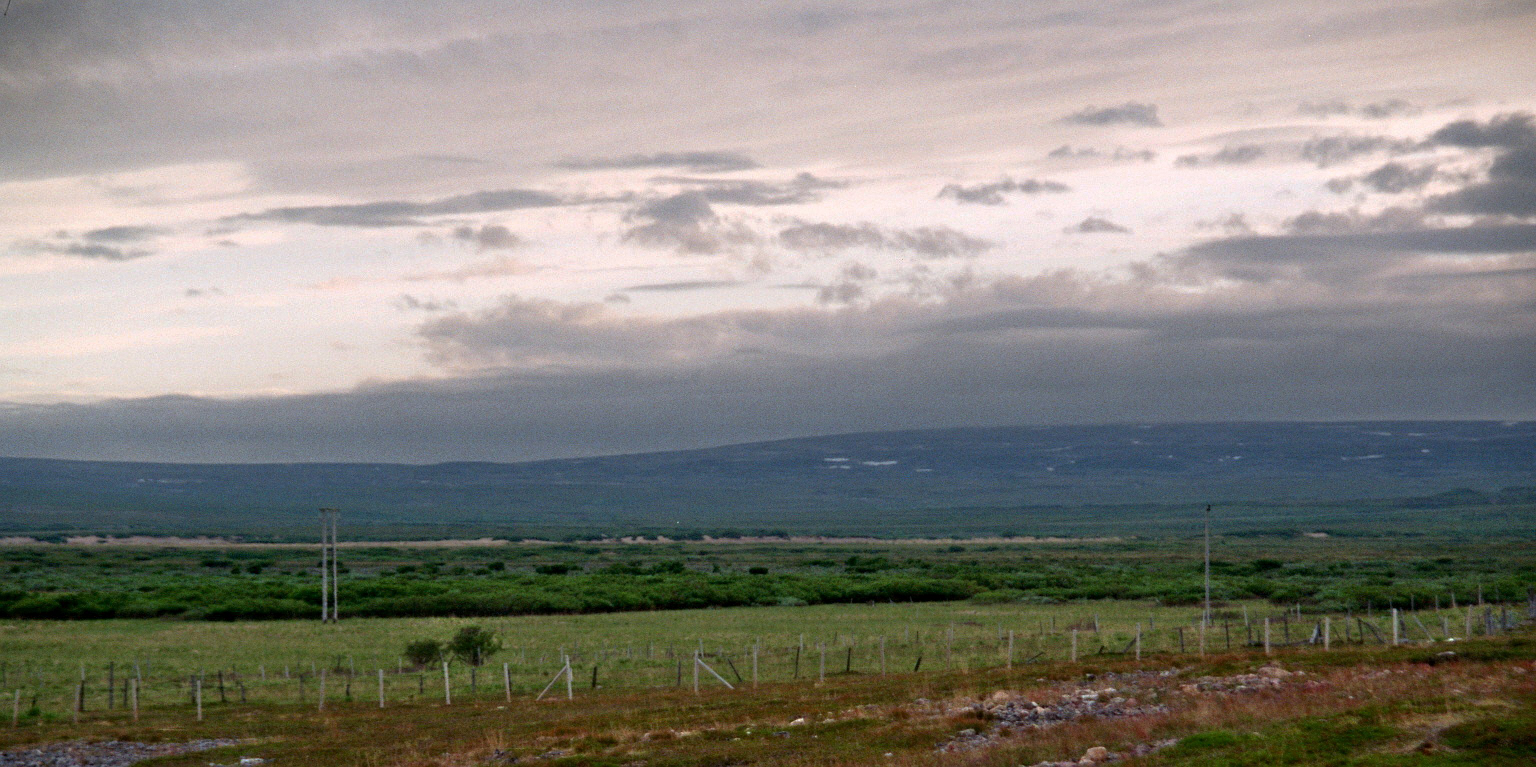
On the northern shore of the Varangerfjord between Vardø and Vadsø

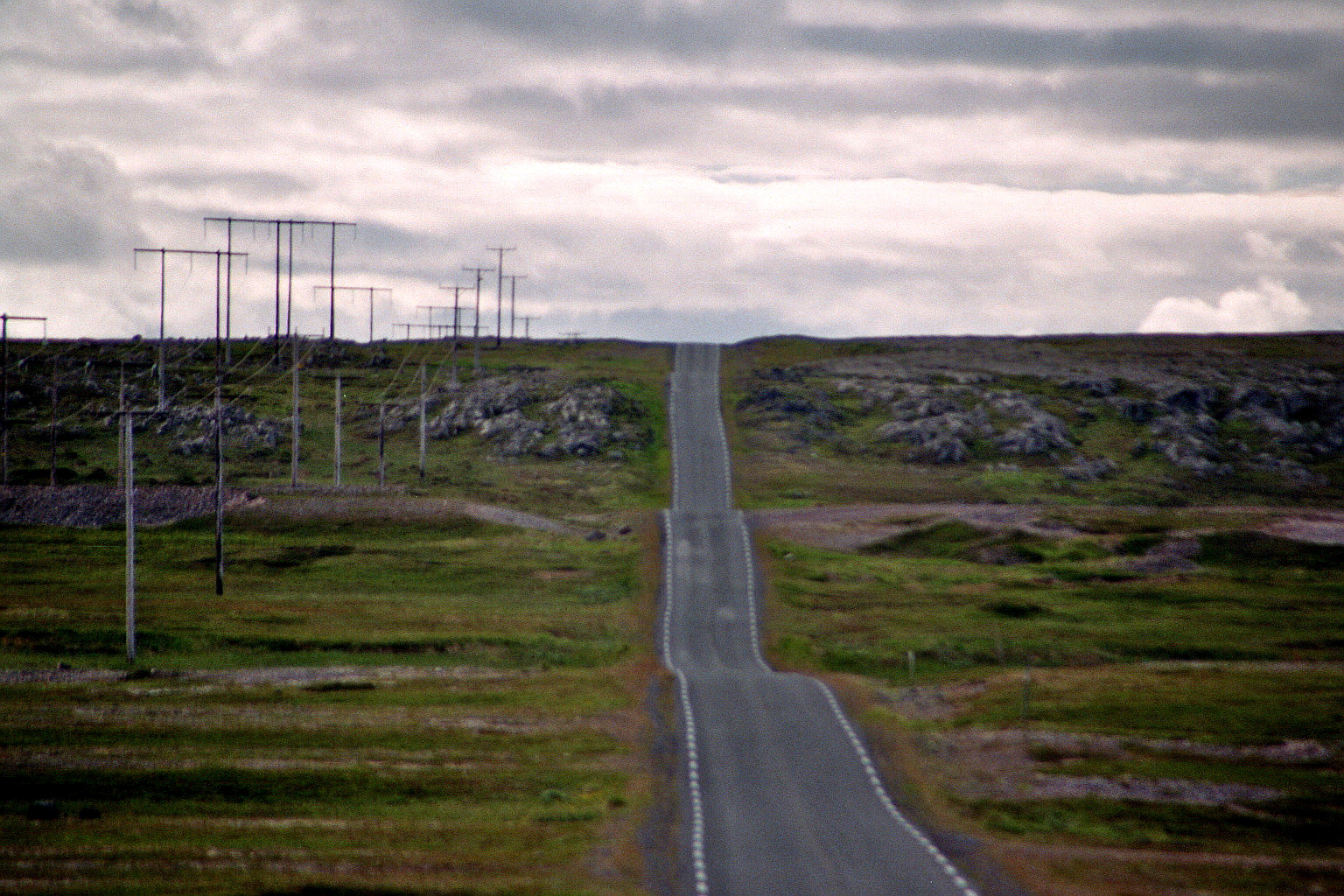
Highway from Vardø to Hamningberg
