= Båtsfjord Municipality =

Municipality in Finnmark, Norway

Båtsfjord Municipality Båtsfjord kommune Báhcavuona gielda (Northern Sami)
- Municipality
- Vardø herred (historic name); Vardø landdistrikt (historic name)
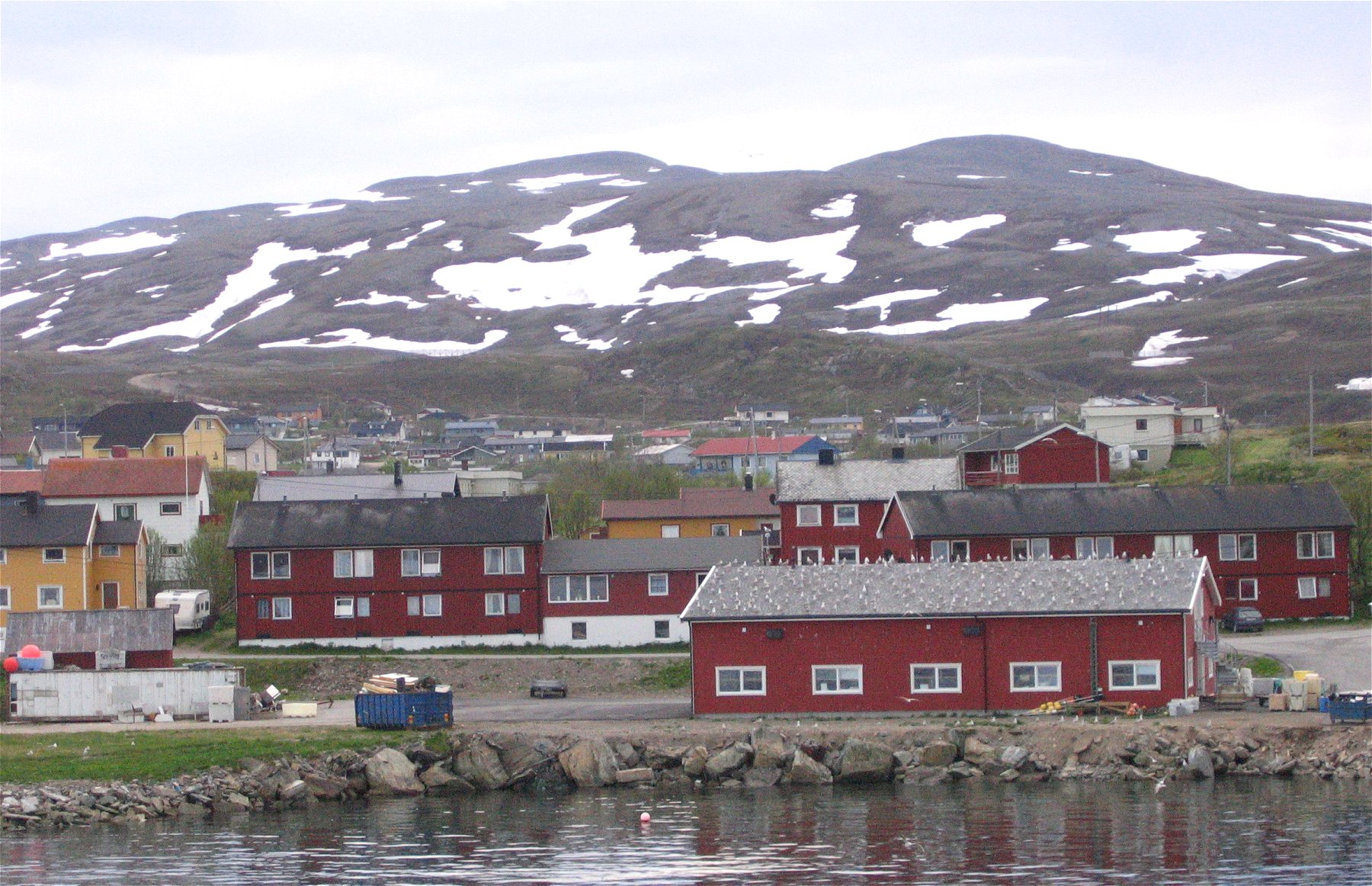
- View of Båtsfjord village

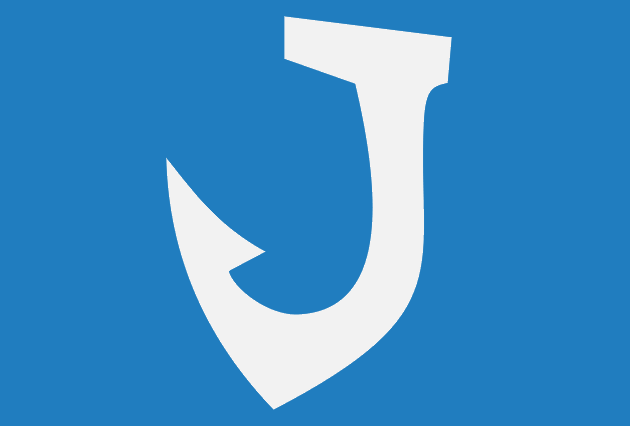
- Flag Coat of arms

- Finnmark within Norway

- Båtsfjord within Finnmark
- Coordinates: 70°38′07″N 29°43′15″E
- Country: Norway
- County: Finnmark
- District: Øst-Finnmark
- Established: 1839
  - Preceded by: Vardø Municipality
- Administrative centre: Båtsfjord

Government
  - Mayor (2023): Øyvind Hauken (LL)

Area
  - Total: 1,435.12 km^{2} (554.10 sq mi)
  - Land: 1,416.59 km^{2} (546.95 sq mi)
  - Water: 18.53 km^{2} (7.15 sq mi) 1.3%
  - Rank: #63 in Norway
- Highest elevation: 634 m (2,080 ft)

Population (2024)
  - Total: 2,113
  - Rank: #276 in Norway
  - Density: 1.5/km^{2} (3.9/sq mi)
  - Change (10 years): ▼ −4.3%
- Demonym: Båtsfjording

Official language
  - Norwegian form: Neutral
- Time zone: UTC+01:00 (CET)
  - Summer (DST): UTC+02:00 (CEST)
- ISO 3166 code: NO-5632
- Website: Official website

Båtsfjord (Northern Sami: Báhcavuotna) is a municipality in Finnmark county, Norway. The administrative centre of the municipality is the village of Båtsfjord (which is the only settlement remaining in the municipality). Båtsfjord Airport is a new, modern airport, located just outside Båtsfjord village. The Hurtigruten coastal express ferry also has regularly scheduled stops in Båtsfjord village.

The 1,435-square-kilometre (554 sq mi) municipality is the 63rd largest by area out of the 357 municipalities in Norway. Båtsfjord is the 276th most populous municipality in Norway with a population of 2,113. The municipality's population density is 1.5 inhabitants per square kilometre (3.9/sq mi) and its population has decreased by 4.3% over the previous 10-year period.

Historically, there were many other villages in the municipality, but they have been abandoned over the years. Some of these villages include Hamningberg (abandoned in 1964), Makkaur (abandoned in the 1950s), Sandfjord/Ytre Syltefjord (abandoned in 1946), Hamna (abandoned around 1950), and Nordfjord (abandoned in 1989).

== General information ==
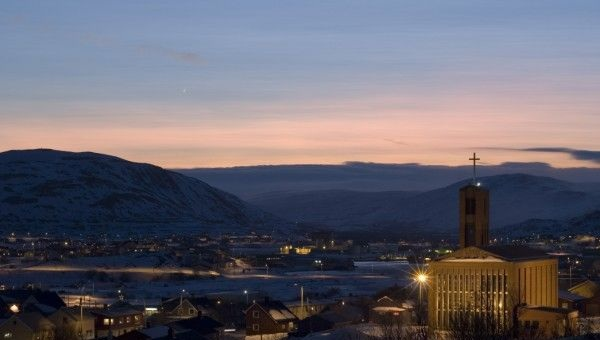
Båtsfjord village

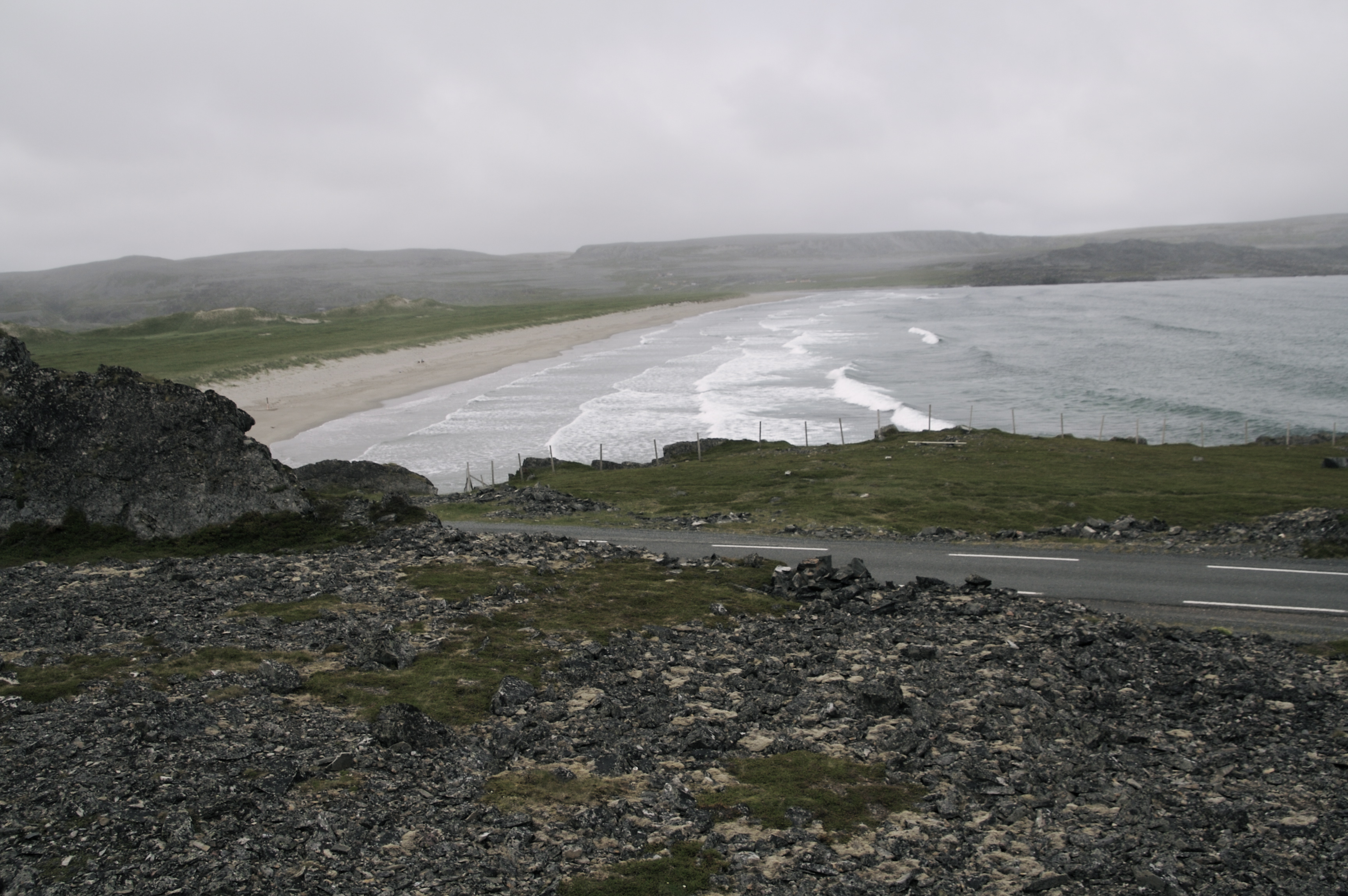
Landscape in eastern Båtsfjord

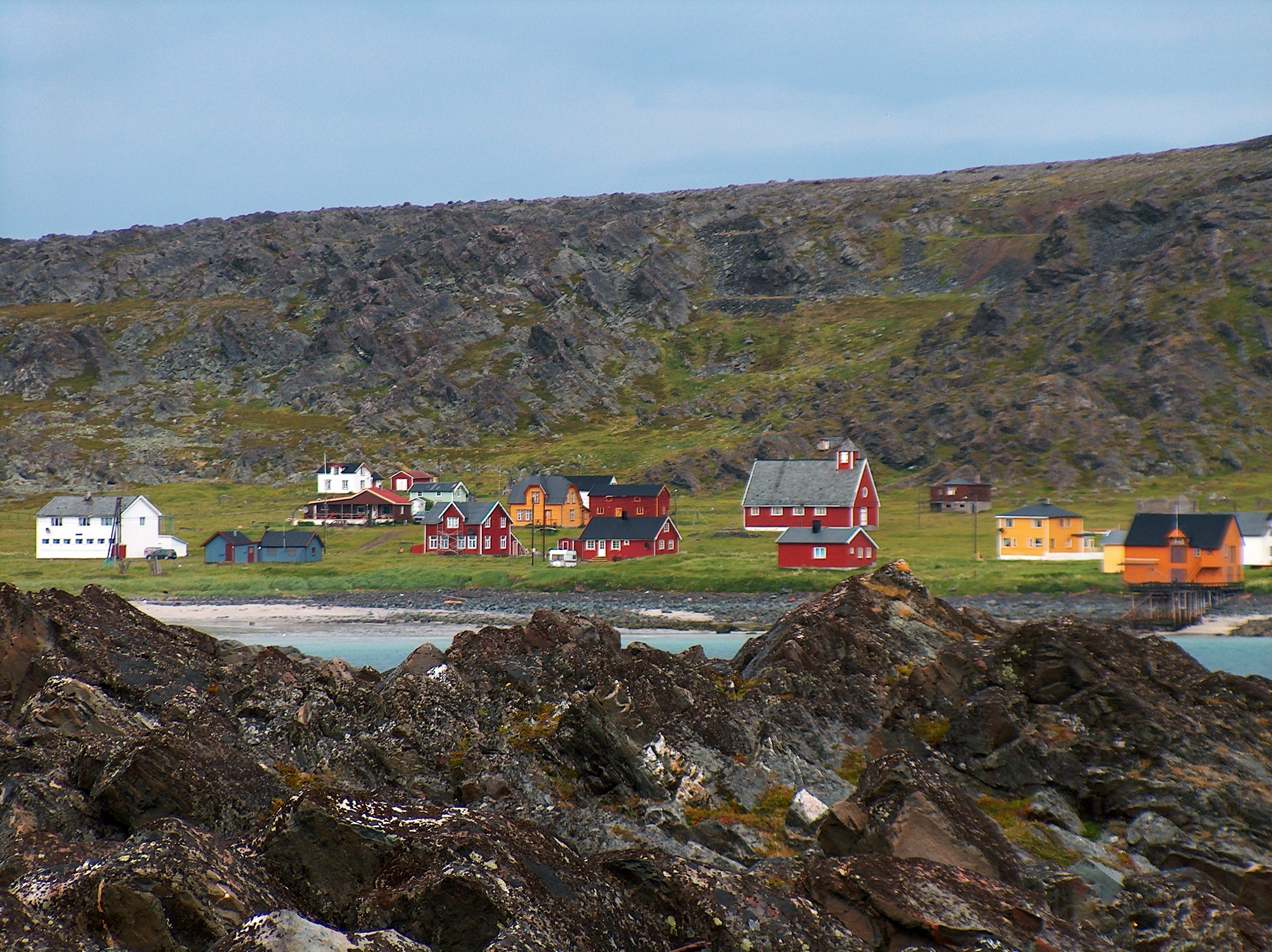
Hamningberg fishing village

Vardø Municipality was established on 1 January 1838 (see formannskapsdistrikt law), encompassing the northeastern part of the Varanger Peninsula. In 1839, to comply with the formannskapsdistrikt law, the rural parts of the municipality, outside of the island/town of Vardø, were separated to form the new municipality of Vardø landdistrikt. Initially, Vardø landdistrikt had a population of 245. The new municipality was too small to be an official self-governing municipality, and it was not until 22 May 1868 when a royal resolution was passed that officially declared it a self-governing municipality. On 1 January 1874, a small part of Vardø landdistrikt (population: 48) was transferred to the town of Vardø. In 1956, the name was changed to Båtsfjord. During the 1960s, there were many municipal mergers across Norway due to the work of the Schei Committee. On 1 January 1964, the eastern fourth of Båtsfjord (population: 621) was transferred to the neighboring Vardø Municipality.

On 1 January 2020, the municipality became part of the newly formed Troms og Finnmark county. Previously, it had been part of the old Finnmark county. On 1 January 2024, the Troms og Finnmark county was divided and the municipality once again became part of Finnmark county.

=== Name ===
The name was originally Vardø landdistrikt (and later Vardø herred) which both mean "the rural district of Vardø", since the municipality surrounded the town of Vardø. On 24 August 1956, a royal resolution changed the name of the municipality to Båtsfjord. This new name was chosen because the village of Båtsfjord (Old Norse: Botnsfjǫrðr) was the main population centre of the municipality. The first element is the genitive case of botn which means "the innermost part of a fjord". The last element is fjord which means "fjord". The village is located at the innermost part of a fjord, so the name has a very straightforward meaning.

=== Coat of arms ===
The coat of arms was granted on 19 April 1985. The official blazon is "Azure, a fish hook argent" (Norwegian: I blått en hvit fiskekrok). This means the arms have a blue field (background) and the charge is a Stone Age bone fish hook. The fishing hook has a tincture of argent which means it is commonly colored white, but if it is made out of metal, then silver is used. The blue color in the field and the fish hook was chosen for the great economic importance of fishing and fish processing in the municipality. The shape of the hook was derived from ancient Stone Age hooks found in the municipality. The arms were designed by Arvid Sveen after a proposal by Svein Harald Eliassen.

== Economy ==
Fishing permits (for salmon fishing) are sold for use on specific rivers including the Sandfjordelva, Syltefjordelva and Komagelva. A crab processing factory was started in 2015. About 20 to 30 million Norwegian kroner was the cost of investment. It initially employed 28 people.

== Government ==
Båtsfjord Municipality is responsible for primary education (through 10th grade), outpatient health services, senior citizen services, welfare and other social services, zoning, economic development, and municipal roads and utilities. The municipality is governed by a municipal council of directly elected representatives. The mayor is indirectly elected by a vote of the municipal council. The municipality is under the jurisdiction of the Indre og Østre Finnmark District Court and the Hålogaland Court of Appeal.

=== Municipal council ===
The municipal council (Kommunestyre) of Båtsfjord Municipality is made up of 15 representatives that are elected to four year terms. The tables below show the current and historical composition of the council by political party.

Båtsfjord kommunestyre 2023–2027
Party name (in Norwegian)	Number of representatives
Labour Party (Arbeiderpartiet)	6
Centre Party (Senterpartiet)	4
Båtsfjord List (Båtsfjordlista)	5
Total number of members:	15

Båtsfjord kommunestyre 2019–2023
Party name (in Norwegian)	Number of representatives
Labour Party (Arbeiderpartiet)	5
Conservative Party (Høyre)	3
Centre Party (Senterpartiet)	7
Total number of members:	15

Båtsfjord kommunestyre 2015–2019
Party name (in Norwegian)	Number of representatives
Labour Party (Arbeiderpartiet)	8
Conservative Party (Høyre)	7
Total number of members:	15

Båtsfjord kommunestyre 2011–2015
Party name (in Norwegian)	Number of representatives
Labour Party (Arbeiderpartiet)	8
Conservative Party (Høyre)	6
Båtsfjord List (Båtsfjordlista)	1
Total number of members:	15

Båtsfjord kommunestyre 2007–2011
Party name (in Norwegian)	Number of representatives
Labour Party (Arbeiderpartiet)	9
Progress Party (Fremskrittspartiet)	2
Conservative Party (Høyre)	4
Total number of members:	15

Båtsfjord kommunestyre 2003–2007
Party name (in Norwegian)	Number of representatives
Labour Party (Arbeiderpartiet)	9
Conservative Party (Høyre)	2
Socialist Left Party (Sosialistisk Venstreparti)	1
Båtsfjord Cross-Party List (Båtsfjord Tverrpolitiske Liste)	3
Total number of members:	15

Båtsfjord kommunestyre 1999–2003
Party name (in Norwegian)	Number of representatives
Labour Party (Arbeiderpartiet)	9
Conservative Party (Høyre)	6
Socialist Left Party (Sosialistisk Venstreparti)	1
Båtsfjord Cross-Party List (Båtsfjord Tverrpolitiske Liste)	5
Total number of members:	21

Båtsfjord kommunestyre 1995–1999
Party name (in Norwegian)	Number of representatives
Labour Party (Arbeiderpartiet)	11
Conservative Party (Høyre)	3
Christian Democratic Party (Kristelig Folkeparti)	2
Båtsfjord Cross-Party List (Båtsfjord Tverrpolitiske Liste)	5
Total number of members:	21

Båtsfjord kommunestyre 1991–1995
Party name (in Norwegian)	Number of representatives
Labour Party (Arbeiderpartiet)	12
Conservative Party (Høyre)	4
Socialist Left Party (Sosialistisk Venstreparti)	3
Liberal Party (Venstre)	2
Total number of members:	21

Båtsfjord kommunestyre 1987–1991
Party name (in Norwegian)	Number of representatives
Labour Party (Arbeiderpartiet)	14
Conservative Party (Høyre)	5
Socialist Left Party (Sosialistisk Venstreparti)	1
Liberal Party (Venstre)	1
Total number of members:	21

Båtsfjord kommunestyre 1983–1987
Party name (in Norwegian)	Number of representatives
Labour Party (Arbeiderpartiet)	15
Conservative Party (Høyre)	4
Socialist Left Party (Sosialistisk Venstreparti)	2
Total number of members:	21

Båtsfjord kommunestyre 1979–1983
Party name (in Norwegian)	Number of representatives
Labour Party (Arbeiderpartiet)	13
Conservative Party (Høyre)	6
Socialist Left Party (Sosialistisk Venstreparti)	2
Total number of members:	21

Båtsfjord kommunestyre 1975–1979
Party name (in Norwegian)	Number of representatives
Labour Party (Arbeiderpartiet)	13
Conservative Party (Høyre)	4
Christian Democratic Party (Kristelig Folkeparti)	1
Socialist Left Party (Sosialistisk Venstreparti)	3
Total number of members:	21

Båtsfjord kommunestyre 1971–1975
Party name (in Norwegian)	Number of representatives
Labour Party (Arbeiderpartiet)	16
Conservative Party (Høyre)	3
Socialist common list (Venstresosialistiske felleslister)	2
Total number of members:	21

Båtsfjord kommunestyre 1967–1971
Party name (in Norwegian)	Number of representatives
Labour Party (Arbeiderpartiet)	12
Conservative Party (Høyre)	3
Socialist People's Party (Sosialistisk Folkeparti)	2
Total number of members:	17

Båtsfjord kommunestyre 1963–1967
Party name (in Norwegian)	Number of representatives
Labour Party (Arbeiderpartiet)	10
Conservative Party (Høyre)	4
Socialist People's Party (Sosialistisk Folkeparti)	3
Total number of members:	17

Båtsfjord herredsstyre 1959–1963
Party name (in Norwegian)	Number of representatives
Labour Party (Arbeiderpartiet)	11
Conservative Party (Høyre)	3
Communist Party (Kommunistiske Parti)	3
Total number of members:	17

Båtsfjord herredsstyre 1957–1959
Party name (in Norwegian)	Number of representatives
Labour Party (Arbeiderpartiet)	10
Communist Party (Kommunistiske Parti)	4
Christian Democratic Party (Kristelig Folkeparti)	1
Local List(s) (Lokale lister)	2
Total number of members:	17

Vardø landdistrikt herredsstyre 1951–1955
Party name (in Norwegian)	Number of representatives
Labour Party (Arbeiderpartiet)	7
Communist Party (Kommunistiske Parti)	2
Local List(s) (Lokale lister)	7
Total number of members:	16

Vardø landdistrikt herredsstyre 1947–1951
Party name (in Norwegian)	Number of representatives
Labour Party (Arbeiderpartiet)	7
Local List(s) (Lokale lister)	9
Total number of members:	16

Vardø landdistrikt herredsstyre 1945–1947
Party name (in Norwegian)	Number of representatives
Labour Party (Arbeiderpartiet)	8
Communist Party (Kommunistiske Parti)	4
List of workers, fishermen, and small farmholders (Arbeidere, fiskere, småbrukere liste)	2
Local List(s) (Lokale lister)	2
Total number of members:	16

Vardø landdistrikt herredsstyre 1937–1941*
Party name (in Norwegian)	Number of representatives
Labour Party (Arbeiderpartiet)	6
Communist Party (Kommunistiske Parti)	4
Local List(s) (Lokale lister)	6
Total number of members:	16
Note: Due to the German occupation of Norway during World War II, no elections were held for new municipal councils until after the war ended in 1945.

=== Mayors ===
The mayor (Norwegian: ordfører) of Båtsfjord Municipality is the political leader of the municipality and the chairperson of the municipal council. Here is a list of people who have held this position:

- 1869–1869: Hans Juel Borchgrevink
- 1869–1870: Erik Hansen Bjerke
- 1871–1873: Oscar Lindboe
- 1874–1878: Erik Hansen Bjerke
- 1879–1880: Jakob Hundseth
- 1881–1882: Martin Hundseth
- 1883–1886: Hans Christian Enoksen
- 1887–1896: Radmand Sundfær (H)
- 1897–1898: Nils Hamborg (V)
- 1899–1901: Johan Isaksen (H)
- 1902–1904: Nils Hamborg (V)
- 1905–1907: Albert Moe
- 1908–1910: Mathias Fuglevik (V)
- 1911–1913: Johannes Sundfær
- 1914–1916: Iver Paulsen (Ap)
- 1917–1919: Johan A. Abrahamsen
- 1920–1925: Arne Hansen
- 1926–1928: Johan A. Abrahamsen
- 1929–1931: Richard Lind (Ap)
- 1932–1934: Thorleif Schirmer (Ap)
- 1935–1945: Alfred Halvari (NKP)
- 1946–1947: Johan Mikalsen (Ap)
- 1948–1963: Leif Nervik (Ap)
- 1964–1975: Ole Martin Nakken (Ap)
- 1975–1975: Einar Sørnes (Ap)
- 1976–1983: Arne Gundersen (Ap)
- 1984–1987: Peder Karlsen (Ap)
- 1988–1991: Tore Gundersen (Ap)
- 1991–1991: Aslaug Eriksen (Ap)
- 1992–1999: Leif Arne Viken (Ap)
- 1999–2003: Just Hjalmar Johansen (H)
- 2003–2007: Geir Knutsen (Ap)
- 2007–2009: Frank Bakke-Jensen (H)
- 2009–2011: Gunn Marit Nilsen (H)
- 2011–2019: Geir Knutsen (Ap)
- 2019–2021: Ronald Wærnes (Sp)
- 2021–2023: Lone Johnsen (Sp)
- 2023–present: Øyvind Hauken (LL)

== Geography ==
The municipality covers an area of 1,433 square kilometres (553 mi^{2}) including Finnmark's highest mountain pass over Ordofjell at 400 metres (1,300 ft) above sea level. It is situated on the northeastern coast of the Varanger Peninsula, on the rocky coastline of the Barents Sea. There are no native trees due to the climate. The Varangerhalvøya National Park lies in the southern part of the municipality. Makkaur Lighthouse lies along the shoreline, near the mouth of the Båtsfjorden, northeast of the village of Båtsfjord. The highest point in the municipality is the 633.85-metre (2,079.6 ft) tall mountain Skipskjølen, located on the border with Vadsø Municipality.

Previously, there were several villages along this barren coast, but today everyone lives in the village of Båtsfjord, with a sheltered harbor at the end of the Båtsfjorden inlet. Among the now-abandoned fishing villages is Hamningberg on the outer coast, which has many well-preserved 19th century wooden houses. Now, it is only used for summer vacation stays. The world's northernmost gannet colony to be found on the stack at Syltefjordstauran, along the Syltefjorden, north of the now-abandoned village of Nordfjord. Two pairs were discovered in 1961, but the colony has now grown to well over 300 pairs.

== Climate ==
Climate data for Båtsfjord
Month	Jan	Feb	Mar	Apr	May	Jun	Jul	Aug	Sep	Oct	Nov	Dec	Year
Daily mean °C (°F)	−6.5 (20.3)	−6.4 (20.5)	−4.4 (24.1)	−1.2 (29.8)	3.0 (37.4)	7.5 (45.5)	11.0 (51.8)	10.0 (50.0)	6.5 (43.7)	1.5 (34.7)	−2.2 (28.0)	−5.0 (23.0)	1.2 (34.2)
Average precipitation mm (inches)	48 (1.9)	38 (1.5)	35 (1.4)	32 (1.3)	30 (1.2)	39 (1.5)	49 (1.9)	59 (2.3)	60 (2.4)	59 (2.3)	48 (1.9)	48 (1.9)	545 (21.5)
Source: Norwegian Meteorological Institute

Climate data for Makkaur Lighthouse 1991-2020 (9 m, extremes 1953-present)
Month	Jan	Feb	Mar	Apr	May	Jun	Jul	Aug	Sep	Oct	Nov	Dec	Year
Record high °C (°F)	7.5 (45.5)	8.2 (46.8)	9.6 (49.3)	13.6 (56.5)	23.5 (74.3)	29.0 (84.2)	32.0 (89.6)	29.4 (84.9)	23.2 (73.8)	14.5 (58.1)	11.2 (52.2)	8.4 (47.1)	32.0 (89.6)
Mean daily maximum °C (°F)	−1 (30)	−1.6 (29.1)	−0.4 (31.3)	2.1 (35.8)	5.9 (42.6)	9.3 (48.7)	13.1 (55.6)	12.9 (55.2)	9.8 (49.6)	5 (41)	1.8 (35.2)	0.3 (32.5)	4.8 (40.6)
Daily mean °C (°F)	−3.8 (25.2)	−4.3 (24.3)	−2.7 (27.1)	−0.1 (31.8)	3.6 (38.5)	7.0 (44.6)	10.2 (50.4)	10.3 (50.5)	7.8 (46.0)	3.2 (37.8)	−0.6 (30.9)	−2.4 (27.7)	2.4 (36.2)
Mean daily minimum °C (°F)	−6.6 (20.1)	−7 (19)	−5.2 (22.6)	−2.2 (28.0)	1.7 (35.1)	5.1 (41.2)	8.2 (46.8)	8.4 (47.1)	6 (43)	1.3 (34.3)	−2.7 (27.1)	−4.8 (23.4)	0.2 (32.3)
Record low °C (°F)	−22.6 (−8.7)	−21.7 (−7.1)	−18.5 (−1.3)	−13.5 (7.7)	−11.5 (11.3)	−2.5 (27.5)	2.0 (35.6)	1.6 (34.9)	−3.5 (25.7)	−10.5 (13.1)	−16.2 (2.8)	−20.4 (−4.7)	−22.6 (−8.7)
Average precipitation mm (inches)	44 (1.7)	35 (1.4)	47 (1.9)	41 (1.6)	37 (1.5)	49 (1.9)	67 (2.6)	70 (2.8)	60 (2.4)	75 (3.0)	43 (1.7)	33 (1.3)	601 (23.8)
Source 1: yr.no/Norwegian Meteorological Institute
Source 2: NOAA

== Buildings and structures ==
=== Churches ===
The Church of Norway has one parish (sokn) within the municipality of Båtsfjord. It is part of the Varanger prosti (deanery) in the Diocese of Nord-Hålogaland. The main church is Båtsfjord Church. There are two other small chapels, but they are only used for special occasions since they are located in uninhabited areas that are only used for summer cottages.

Churches in Båtsfjord
Parish (sokn)	Name	Location of the church	Year built
Båtsfjord	Båtsfjord Church	Båtsfjord	1971
Båtsfjord	Hamningberg Chapel	Hamningberg	1949
Båtsfjord	Syltefjord Chapel	Nordfjord	1934

=== Mast for broadcasting ===
- 241-metre (791 ft) high guyed mast for FM-/TV-broadcasting. See List of tallest structures in Norway.

== Notable people ==
- Geir Knutsen (born 1959), a politician
- Frank Bakke-Jensen (born 1965), a politician who was Mayor of Båtsfjord from 2007 and Minister of Defence since 2017
- Gjert Ingebrigtsen (born 1966), a sports coach
- Jan Thore Grefstad, (Norwegian Wiki) (born 1978), a rock singer and songwriter
