= Nord-Varanger Municipality =

Former municipality in Finnmark, Norway

Nord-Varanger Municipality Nord-Varanger herred
- Former municipality
- Nordvaranger herred (historic name)
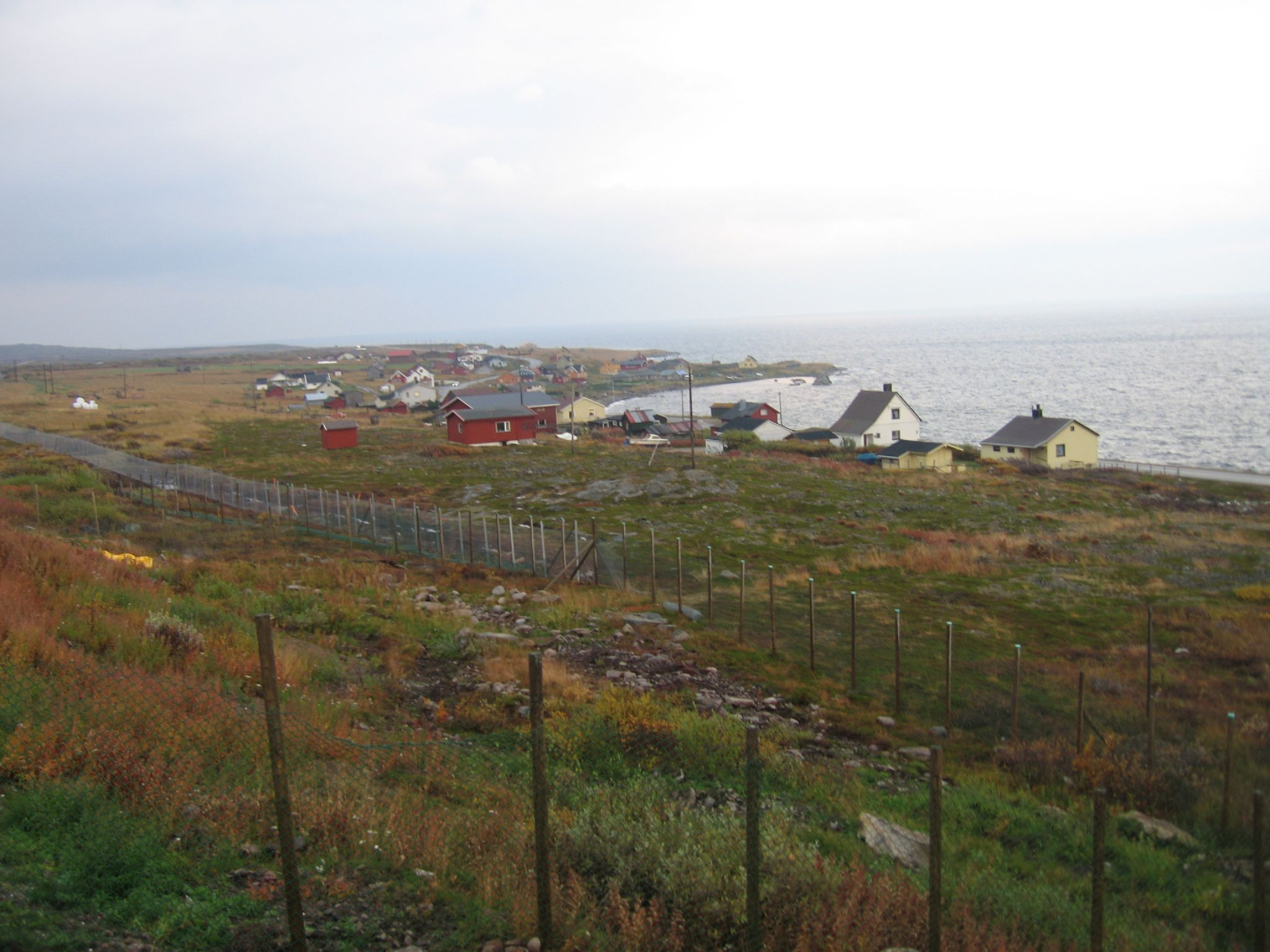

- Finnmark within Norway

- Nord-Varanger within Finnmark
- Coordinates: 70°04′49″N 29°43′53″E
- Country: Norway
- County: Finnmark
- District: Øst-Finnmark
- Established: 1 Jan 1894
  - Preceded by: Vadsø Municipality
- Disestablished: 1 Jan 1964
  - Succeeded by: Vadsø Municipality
- Administrative centre: Vadsø

Area (upon dissolution)
  - Total: 1,253.4 km^{2} (483.9 sq mi)
  - Rank: #65 in Norway
- Highest elevation: 633.85 m (2,079.6 ft)

Population (1963)
  - Total: 1,617
  - Rank: #515 in Norway
  - Density: 1.3/km^{2} (3.4/sq mi)
- Demonym: Varangværing

Official language
  - Norwegian form: Bokmål
- Time zone: UTC+01:00 (CET)
  - Summer (DST): UTC+02:00 (CEST)
- ISO 3166 code: NO-2029

Nord-Varanger is a former municipality in Finnmark county in Norway. The 1,253-square-kilometre (484 sq mi) municipality existed from 1894 until its dissolution in 1964. The area is now part of Vadsø Municipality. The administrative centre of the municipality was in the town of Vadsø. Other notable villages included Ekkerøy, Kiby, Krampenes, Skallelv, Valen, and Vestre Jakobselv.

Prior to its dissolution in 1964, the 1,253.4-square-kilometre (483.9 sq mi) municipality was the 65th largest by area out of the 689 municipalities in Norway. Nord-Varanger Municipality was the 515th most populous municipality in Norway with a population of about 1,617. The municipality's population density was 1.3 inhabitants per square kilometre (3.4/sq mi).

== History ==
The kjøpstad (market town) of Vadsø was established as a municipality on 1 January 1838 (see formannskapsdistrikt law). The law stated that market towns must be separate municipalities from the rural municipalities around them, but because of the low population in the rural area around the town, the municipality originally included the whole rural area surrounding it. That rural area was known as the Vadsø landsogn (lit. 'Vadsø rural parish'). On 1 January 1894, the Vadsø landsogn was finally separated from the town of Vadsø and became a separate municipality named Nord-Varanger. Nord-Varanger had an initial population of 1,296. During the 1960s, there were many municipal mergers across Norway due to the work of the Schei Committee. On 1 January 1964, Nord-Varanger (population: 1,587) was merged with the town of Vadsø once again to create the new Vadsø Municipality.

=== Name ===
The municipality (originally the parish) is named after the Varangerfjorden (Old Norse: Verangr or Verjangr). The first element is verja which is the plural genitive case of the word which means "fishing village". The last element is angr which means "bay" or "small fjord". It was first probably used for the narrow fjord on the inside of Angsnes which now is called "Meskfjorden" and leads into Varangerbotn. Historically, the name of the municipality was spelled Nordvaranger. On 3 November 1917, a royal resolution changed the spelling of the name of the municipality to Nord-Varanger.

== Geography ==
The municipality was located on the southern half of the Varanger Peninsula, east of the Jakobselva river, along the Varangerfjorden. The highest point in the municipality was the 633.85-metre (2,079.6 ft) tall mountain Bealjáidčearru (also known as Skipskjølen in Norwegian), located on the northern border of the municipality.

== Government ==
While it existed, Nord-Varanger Municipality was responsible for primary education (through 10th grade), outpatient health services, senior citizen services, welfare and other social services, zoning, economic development, and municipal roads and utilities. The municipality was governed by a municipal council of directly elected representatives. The mayor was indirectly elected by a vote of the municipal council. The municipality was under the jurisdiction of the Hålogaland Court of Appeal.

=== Municipal council ===
The municipal council (Heradsstyre) of Nord-Varanger Municipality was made up of 17 representatives that were elected to four year terms. The tables below show the historical composition of the council by political party.

Nord-Varanger herredsstyre 1959–1963
Party name (in Norwegian)	Number of representatives
Labour Party (Arbeiderpartiet)	10
Conservative Party (Høyre)	2
Communist Party (Kommunistiske Parti)	3
Christian Democratic Party (Kristelig Folkeparti)	2
Total number of members:	17
Note: On 1 January 1964, Nord-Varanger Municipality became part of Vadsø Municipality.

Nord-Varanger herredsstyre 1955–1959
Party name (in Norwegian)	Number of representatives
Labour Party (Arbeiderpartiet)	11
Conservative Party (Høyre)	2
Communist Party (Kommunistiske Parti)	3
Christian Democratic Party (Kristelig Folkeparti)	1
Total number of members:	17

Nord-Varanger herredsstyre 1951–1955
Party name (in Norwegian)	Number of representatives
Labour Party (Arbeiderpartiet)	6
Communist Party (Kommunistiske Parti)	2
Liberal Party (Venstre)	1
List of workers, fishermen, and small farmholders (Arbeidere, fiskere, småbrukere liste)	3
Total number of members:	12

Nord-Varanger herredsstyre 1947–1951
Party name (in Norwegian)	Number of representatives
Labour Party (Arbeiderpartiet)	7
Communist Party (Kommunistiske Parti)	3
Liberal Party (Venstre)	2
Total number of members:	12

Nord-Varanger herredsstyre 1945–1947
Party name (in Norwegian)	Number of representatives
Labour Party (Arbeiderpartiet)	8
Communist Party (Kommunistiske Parti)	3
Liberal Party (Venstre)	1
Total number of members:	12

Nord-Varanger herredsstyre 1937–1941*
Party name (in Norwegian)	Number of representatives
Labour Party (Arbeiderpartiet)	8
Liberal Party (Venstre)	3
Local List(s) (Lokale lister)	1
Total number of members:	12
Note: Due to the German occupation of Norway during World War II, no elections were held for new municipal councils until after the war ended in 1945.

=== Mayors ===
The mayor (Norwegian: ordfører) of Nord-Varanger Municipality was the political leader of the municipality and the chairperson of the municipal council. The following people have held this position:

- 1894–1897: Thomas Hansen Lilleeng
- 1898–1910: Abraham Pedersen Kiby
- 1911–1916: Konrad Hansen
- 1917–1925: O.E. Sundelin
- 1925–1929: Ove Olsen
- 1929–1942: Waldemar Harila
- 1942–1945: E.M. Amundsen (NS)
- 1946–1963: Henry Karlsen (Ap)

== See also ==
- List of former municipalities of Norway
