= Vadsø =

Vadsø or Vadso may refer to:

== Places ==
- Vadsø Municipality, a municipality in Finnmark county, Norway
  - Vadsø (town), a town within Vadsø Municipality in Finnmark county, Norway
  - Vadsø Church, a church in Vadsø Municipality in Finnmark county, Norway
  - Vadsø Airport, an airport in Vadsø Municipality in Finnmark county, Norway
