= Jakobselva =

Jakobselva may refer to two different rivers in northern Norway:

- Jakobselva (Sør-Varanger), a river in Sør-Varanger municipality in Finnmark county, Norway
- Jakobselva (Vadsø), a river in Vadsø municipality in Finnmark county, Norway
