= Vadsø Municipality =

Municipality in Finnmark, Norway

Vadsø Municipality Vadsø kommune Čáhcesuolu gielda (Northern Sami) Vesisaaren komuuni (Kven)
- Municipality
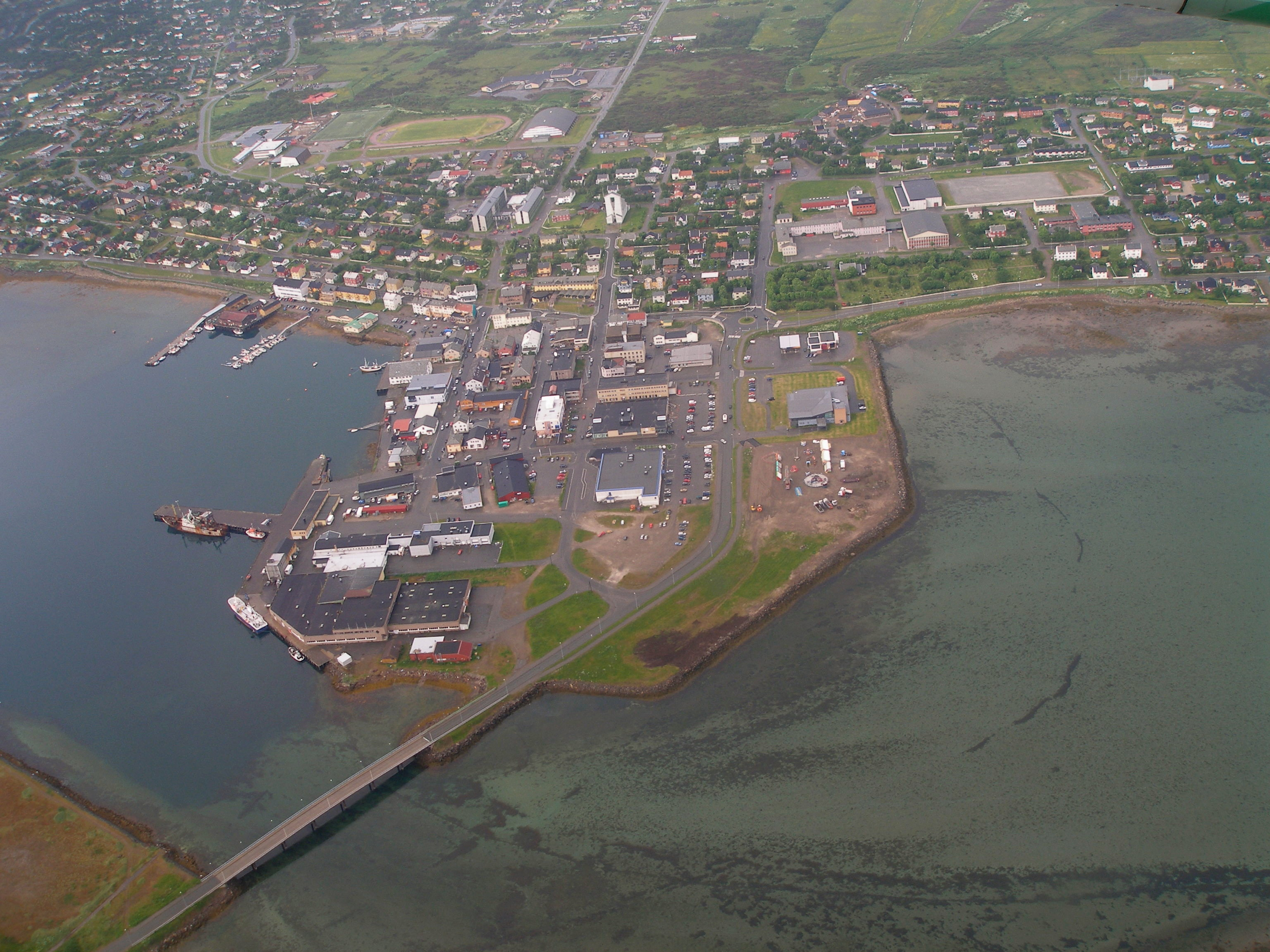

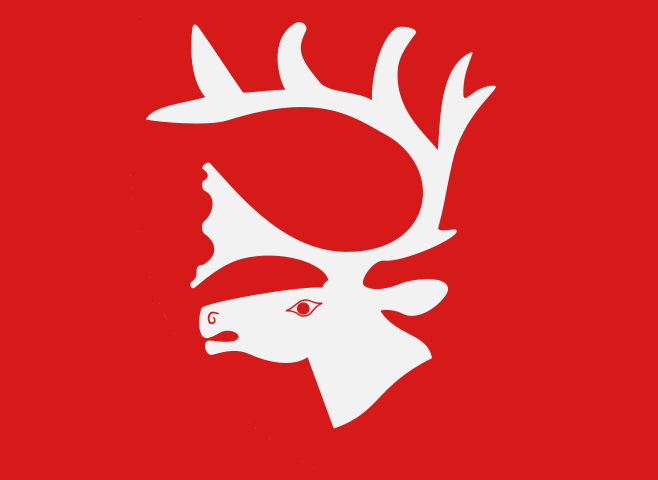
- Flag Coat of arms

- Finnmark within Norway

- Vadsø within Finnmark
- Coordinates: 70°04′24″N 29°44′59″E
- Country: Norway
- County: Finnmark
- District: Øst-Finnmark
- Established: 1 Jan 1838
- Administrative centre: Vadsø

Government
  - Mayor (2019): Wenche Pederson (Ap)

Area
  - Total: 1,258.06 km^{2} (485.74 sq mi)
  - Land: 1,233.46 km^{2} (476.24 sq mi)
  - Water: 24.60 km^{2} (9.50 sq mi) 2%
  - Rank: #83 in Norway
- Highest elevation: 633.9 m (2,080 ft)

Population (2024)
  - Total: 5,807
  - Rank: #166 in Norway
  - Density: 4.6/km^{2} (12/sq mi)
  - Change (10 years): ▼ −6.7%
- Demonym: Vadsøværing

Official language
  - Norwegian form: Bokmål
- Time zone: UTC+01:00 (CET)
  - Summer (DST): UTC+02:00 (CEST)
- ISO 3166 code: NO-5607
- Website: Official website

Vadsø (Norwegian: [ˈvɑ̂dsøː]; Northern Sami: Čáhcesuolu; Kven: Vesisaari) is a municipality in Finnmark County, Norway. The administrative centre of the municipality is the town of Vadsø, which is also the administrative centre of Finnmark county. Other settlements in Vadsø include Ekkerøy, Kiby, Krampenes, Skallelv, Valen, and Vestre Jakobselv.

The 1,258-square-kilometre (486 sq mi) municipality is the 83rd largest by area out of the 357 municipalities in Norway. Vadsø is the 166th most populous municipality in Norway with a population of 5,807. The municipality's population density is 4.6 inhabitants per square kilometre (12/sq mi) and its population has decreased by 6.7% over the previous 10-year period.

== General information ==
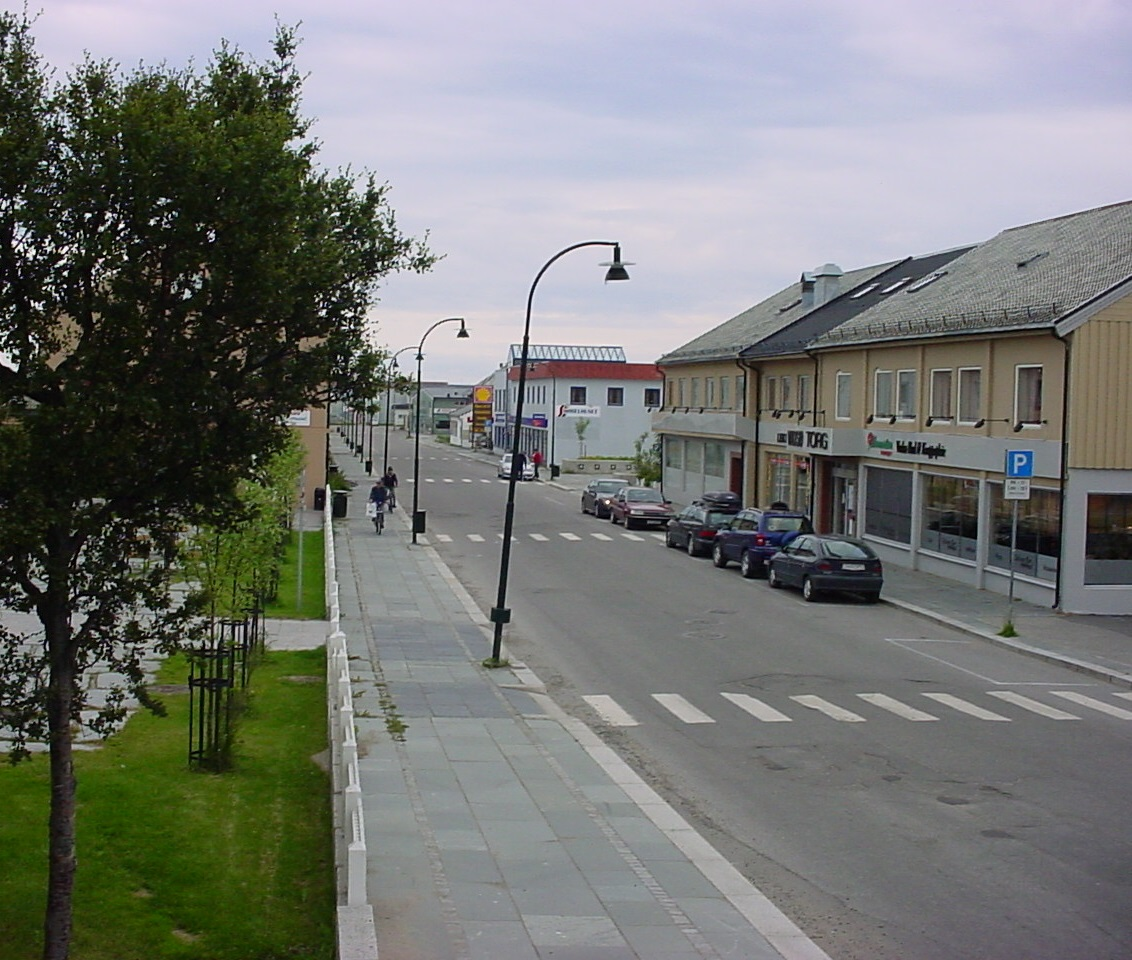
The street of Tollbugata in Vadsø

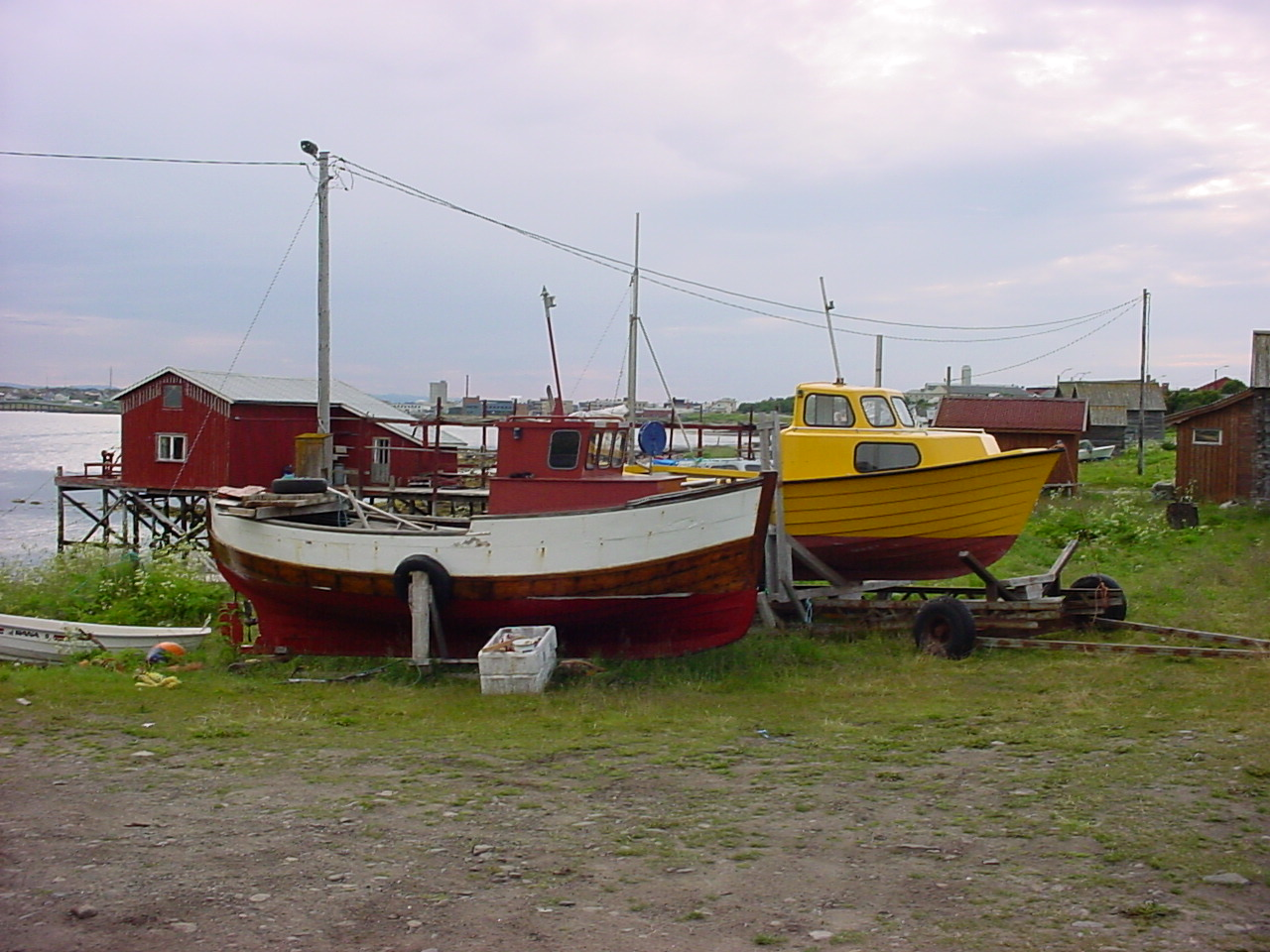
Fishing boats on land in Vadsø

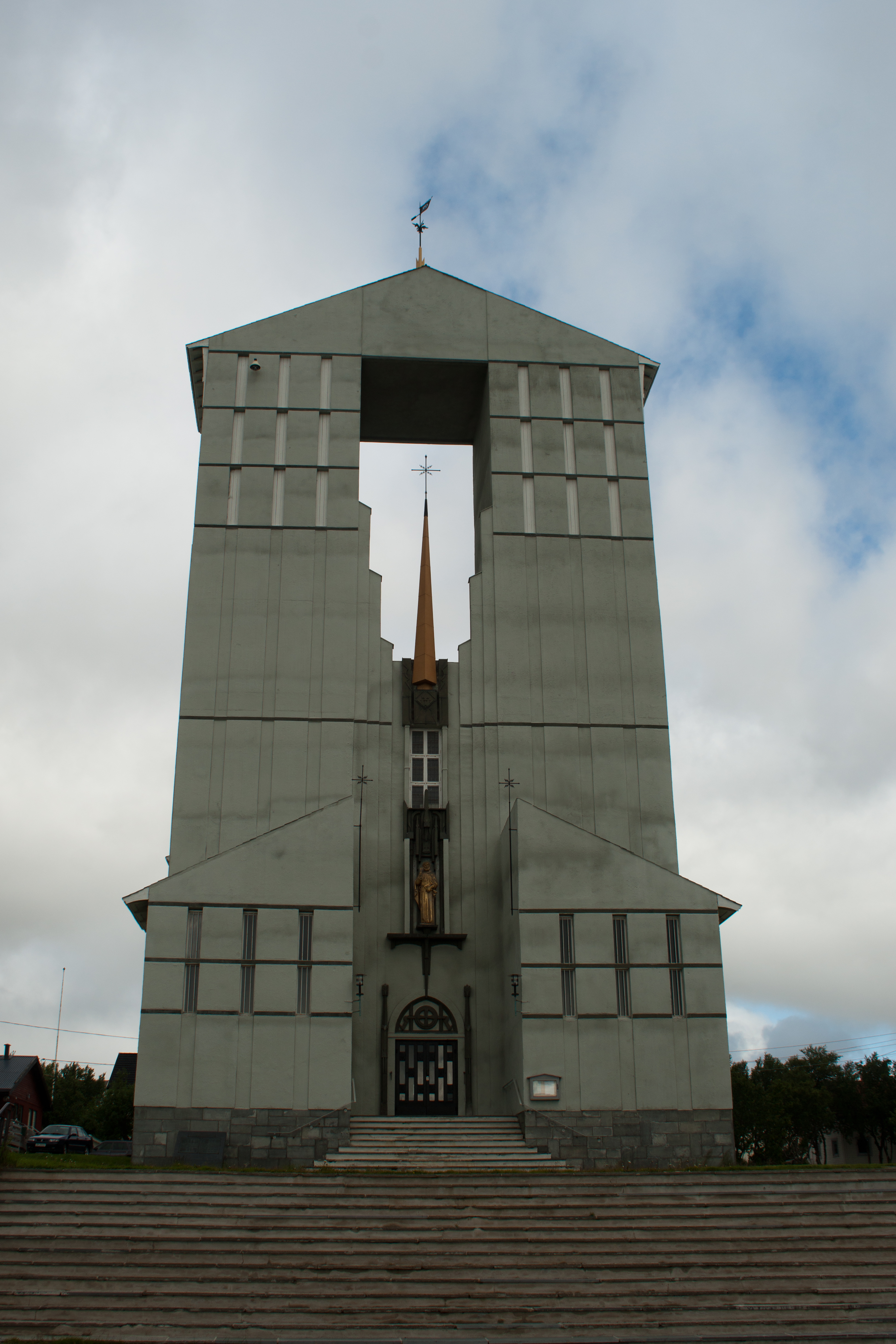
Vadsø Church

The village of Vadsø was granted town status in 1833. In 1838, the town of Vadsø and the entire rural district surrounding the Varangerfjorden were established as the new Vadsø Municipality (see formannskapsdistrikt law). The law required that all towns should be separated from their rural districts, but because of a low population and very few voters, this was impossible to carry out for the municipality of Vadsø in 1838. (This was also true in the nearby towns of Hammerfest and Vardø.)

In 1839, the western district (population: 598) was separated to become the new Nesseby Municipality. This left Vadsø with 388 residents. In 1858, Vadsø Municipality changed again: Nesseby Municipality (population: 706) was merged back into Vadsø and the district of Vadsø located south of the Varangerfjorden (population: 1,171) was separated to form the new Sør-Varanger Municipality. This change resulted in a population of 2,050 in Vadsø Municipality. In 1864, the western district of Vadsø (population: 866) was separated (once again) to re-create Nesseby Municipality, leaving Vadsø with 1,367 residents.

On 1 January 1894, the rest of the rural district (population: 1,296) surrounding the town of Vadsø was separated to form the new Nord-Varanger Municipality. This left just the town of Vadsø remaining in the municipality of Vadsø which now had 1,114 residents. During the 1960s, there were many municipal mergers across Norway due to the work of the Schei Committee. On 1 January 1964, Nord-Varanger Municipality (population: 1,587) was merged with the town of Vadsø (population: 3,353) to form the present-day Vadsø Municipality.

On 1 January 2020, the municipality became part of the newly formed Troms og Finnmark county. Previously, it had been part of the old Finnmark county. On 1 January 2024, the Troms og Finnmark county was divided and the municipality once again became part of Finnmark county.

=== Name ===
The municipality is named after the town of Vadsø. The name of the town comes from the island Vadsøya, since that was the original townsite. The Old Norse form of the name would be *Vazøy, *Vatsøy, *Vassøy; the eldest references to the town show the forms Vasthøen (1520) and Vaadsøenn (1567). The first element is the genitive case of vatn which means "water" and the last element is øy which means "island". Therefore, the meaning of the name is "the island with drinking water".

=== Coat of arms ===
The coat of arms was granted on 20 February 1976. The official blazon is "Gules, a reindeer's head couped argent" (Norwegian: På rød bunn et hvitt reinbukkhode). This means the arms have a red field (background) and the charge is the head of a reindeer stag. The reindeer head has a tincture of argent which means it is commonly colored white, but if it is made out of metal, then silver is used. Reindeer husbandry is common in the municipality and of great economic importance, especially important among the Sámi population. The reindeer also symbolizes freedom, strength, and endurance. The arms were designed by Hallvard Trætteberg.

=== Churches ===
The Church of Norway has one parish (sokn) within Vadsø Municipality. It is part of the Varanger prosti (deanery) in the Diocese of Nord-Hålogaland.

Churches in Vadsø Municipality
Parish (sokn)	Church name	Location of the church	Year built
Vadsø	Vadsø Church	Vadsø	1958
Vadsø	Vestre Jakobselv Church	Vestre Jakobselv	1940
Vadsø	Skallelv Chapel	Skallelv	1961

== History ==
In the 16th century, the settlement of Vadsø consisted of a fishing village and the old Vadsø Church, located on the island of Vadsøya. The settlement later moved to the mainland. Pomor trade led Vadsø to be a major trading centre in this part of Norway. Township privilege was granted in 1833, and soon settlers came from Finland and the northern part of Sweden, which suffered from famine.

Finnish was rapidly becoming the language of the majority, and this continued for decades. As of 2016, Finnish is still spoken in some households. During the occupation of Norway by Nazi Germany, Vadsø suffered several air raids from the Soviet Union, which bombed German troops. However, there are, unlike most places in Finnmark, a number of 19th century wooden houses preserved close to the city centre, notably the house of Esbensen, built by a Norwegian, and the house of Tuomainen, built by a Finn. On the island of Vadsøya is the airship mast used by Umberto Nobile and Roald Amundsen for their expedition over the North Pole with the airship Norge in 1926, and used again on Nobile's flight with the airship Italia in 1928.

== Government ==
Vadsø Municipality is responsible for primary education (through 10th grade), outpatient health services, senior citizen services, welfare and other social services, zoning, economic development, and municipal roads and utilities. The municipality is governed by a municipal council of directly elected representatives. The mayor is indirectly elected by a vote of the municipal council. The municipality is under the jurisdiction of the Indre og Østre Finnmark District Court and the Hålogaland Court of Appeal.

=== Municipal council ===
The municipal council (Kommunestyre) of Vadsø Municipality is made up of 21 representatives that are elected to four year terms. The tables below show the current and historical composition of the council by political party.

Vadsø kommunestyre 2023–2027
Party name (in Norwegian)	Number of representatives
Labour Party (Arbeiderpartiet)	7
Progress Party (Fremskrittspartiet)	3
Conservative Party (Høyre)	4
Centre Party (Senterpartiet)	2
Socialist Left Party (Sosialistisk Venstreparti)	1
Liberal Party (Venstre)	1
Socialist Forum (Sosialistisk Forum)	3
Total number of members:	21

Vadsø kommunestyre 2019–2023
Party name (in Norwegian)	Number of representatives
Labour Party (Arbeiderpartiet)	7
Green Party (Miljøpartiet De Grønne)	1
Conservative Party (Høyre)	5
Red Party (Rødt)	1
Centre Party (Senterpartiet)	4
Socialist Left Party (Sosialistisk Venstreparti)	3
Total number of members:	21

Vadsø kommunestyre 2015–2019
Party name (in Norwegian)	Number of representatives
Labour Party (Arbeiderpartiet)	8
Green Party (Miljøpartiet De Grønne)	1
Conservative Party (Høyre)	10
Christian Democratic Party (Kristelig Folkeparti)	1
Socialist Left Party (Sosialistisk Venstreparti)	3
Vadsø List (Vadsølista)	2
Total number of members:	25

Vadsø kommunestyre 2011–2015
Party name (in Norwegian)	Number of representatives
Labour Party (Arbeiderpartiet)	10
Progress Party (Fremskrittspartiet)	1
Conservative Party (Høyre)	7
Christian Democratic Party (Kristelig Folkeparti)	2
Socialist Left Party (Sosialistisk Venstreparti)	3
Liberal Party (Venstre)	2
Total number of members:	25

Vadsø kommunestyre 2007–2011
Party name (in Norwegian)	Number of representatives
Labour Party (Arbeiderpartiet)	9
Progress Party (Fremskrittspartiet)	2
Conservative Party (Høyre)	7
Christian Democratic Party (Kristelig Folkeparti)	1
Centre Party (Senterpartiet)	1
Socialist Left Party (Sosialistisk Venstreparti)	5
Total number of members:	25

Vadsø kommunestyre 2003–2007
Party name (in Norwegian)	Number of representatives
Labour Party (Arbeiderpartiet)	8
Progress Party (Fremskrittspartiet)	2
Conservative Party (Høyre)	5
Communist Party (Kommunistiske Parti)	1
Christian Democratic Party (Kristelig Folkeparti)	1
Centre Party (Senterpartiet)	1
Socialist Left Party (Sosialistisk Venstreparti)	7
Total number of members:	25

Vadsø kommunestyre 1999–2003
Party name (in Norwegian)	Number of representatives
Labour Party (Arbeiderpartiet)	9
Progress Party (Fremskrittspartiet)	2
Conservative Party (Høyre)	9
Communist Party (Kommunistiske Parti)	2
Christian Democratic Party (Kristelig Folkeparti)	1
Socialist Left Party (Sosialistisk Venstreparti)	5
Liberal Party (Venstre)	1
Total number of members:	29

Vadsø kommunestyre 1995–1999
Party name (in Norwegian)	Number of representatives
Labour Party (Arbeiderpartiet)	11
Progress Party (Fremskrittspartiet)	1
Conservative Party (Høyre)	6
Communist Party (Kommunistiske Parti)	3
Christian Democratic Party (Kristelig Folkeparti)	1
Centre Party (Senterpartiet)	1
Socialist Left Party (Sosialistisk Venstreparti)	4
Liberal Party (Venstre)	2
Total number of members:	29

Vadsø kommunestyre 1991–1995
Party name (in Norwegian)	Number of representatives
Labour Party (Arbeiderpartiet)	11
Conservative Party (Høyre)	6
Communist Party (Kommunistiske Parti)	2
Christian Democratic Party (Kristelig Folkeparti)	2
Socialist Left Party (Sosialistisk Venstreparti)	7
Liberal Party (Venstre)	1
Total number of members:	29

Vadsø kommunestyre 1987–1991
Party name (in Norwegian)	Number of representatives
Labour Party (Arbeiderpartiet)	15
Progress Party (Fremskrittspartiet)	2
Conservative Party (Høyre)	5
Communist Party (Kommunistiske Parti)	1
Christian Democratic Party (Kristelig Folkeparti)	2
Socialist Left Party (Sosialistisk Venstreparti)	3
Liberal Party (Venstre)	1
Total number of members:	29

Vadsø kommunestyre 1983–1987
Party name (in Norwegian)	Number of representatives
Labour Party (Arbeiderpartiet)	17
Conservative Party (Høyre)	6
Communist Party (Kommunistiske Parti)	1
Christian Democratic Party (Kristelig Folkeparti)	2
Socialist Left Party (Sosialistisk Venstreparti)	2
Liberal Party (Venstre)	1
Total number of members:	29

Vadsø kommunestyre 1979–1983
Party name (in Norwegian)	Number of representatives
Labour Party (Arbeiderpartiet)	14
Conservative Party (Høyre)	8
Communist Party (Kommunistiske Parti)	1
Christian Democratic Party (Kristelig Folkeparti)	2
Centre Party (Senterpartiet)	1
Socialist Left Party (Sosialistisk Venstreparti)	2
Liberal Party (Venstre)	1
Total number of members:	29

Vadsø kommunestyre 1975–1979
Party name (in Norwegian)	Number of representatives
Labour Party (Arbeiderpartiet)	15
Conservative Party (Høyre)	6
Christian Democratic Party (Kristelig Folkeparti)	2
Centre Party (Senterpartiet)	1
Socialist Left Party (Sosialistisk Venstreparti)	4
Liberal Party (Venstre)	1
Total number of members:	29

Vadsø kommunestyre 1971–1975
Party name (in Norwegian)	Number of representatives
Labour Party (Arbeiderpartiet)	15
Conservative Party (Høyre)	6
Communist Party (Kommunistiske Parti)	2
Christian Democratic Party (Kristelig Folkeparti)	1
Centre Party (Senterpartiet)	1
Socialist People's Party (Sosialistisk Folkeparti)	2
Liberal Party (Venstre)	2
Total number of members:	29

Vadsø kommunestyre 1967–1971
Party name (in Norwegian)	Number of representatives
Labour Party (Arbeiderpartiet)	15
Conservative Party (Høyre)	6
Communist Party (Kommunistiske Parti)	2
Christian Democratic Party (Kristelig Folkeparti)	1
Socialist People's Party (Sosialistisk Folkeparti)	3
Liberal Party (Venstre)	2
Total number of members:	29

Vadsø kommunestyre 1964–1967
Party name (in Norwegian)	Number of representatives
Labour Party (Arbeiderpartiet)	17
Conservative Party (Høyre)	7
Communist Party (Kommunistiske Parti)	3
Christian Democratic Party (Kristelig Folkeparti)	1
Liberal Party (Venstre)	1
Total number of members:	29

Vadsø bystyre 1959–1963
Party name (in Norwegian)	Number of representatives
Labour Party (Arbeiderpartiet)	12
Conservative Party (Høyre)	6
Communist Party (Kommunistiske Parti)	2
Liberal Party (Venstre)	1
Total number of members:	21

Vadsø bystyre 1955–1959
Party name (in Norwegian)	Number of representatives
Labour Party (Arbeiderpartiet)	11
Conservative Party (Høyre)	6
Communist Party (Kommunistiske Parti)	3
Liberal Party (Venstre)	1
Total number of members:	21

Vadsø bystyre 1951–1955
Party name (in Norwegian)	Number of representatives
Labour Party (Arbeiderpartiet)	11
Conservative Party (Høyre)	5
Communist Party (Kommunistiske Parti)	3
Liberal Party (Venstre)	1
Total number of members:	20

Vadsø bystyre 1947–1951
Party name (in Norwegian)	Number of representatives
Labour Party (Arbeiderpartiet)	8
Conservative Party (Høyre)	6
Communist Party (Kommunistiske Parti)	4
Liberal Party (Venstre)	1
Local List(s) (Lokale lister)	1
Total number of members:	20

Vadsø bystyre 1945–1947
Party name (in Norwegian)	Number of representatives
Labour Party (Arbeiderpartiet)	8
Conservative Party (Høyre)	3
Communist Party (Kommunistiske Parti)	5
Liberal Party (Venstre)	1
Local List(s) (Lokale lister)	3
Total number of members:	20

Vadsø bystyre 1937–1941*
Party name (in Norwegian)	Number of representatives
Labour Party (Arbeiderpartiet)	10
Local List(s) (Lokale lister)	10
Total number of members:	20
Note: Due to the German occupation of Norway during World War II, no elections were held for new municipal councils until after the war ended in 1945.

Vadsø bystyre 1934–1937
Party name (in Norwegian)	Number of representatives
Labour Party (Arbeiderpartiet)	11
Conservative Party (Høyre)	4
Nasjonal Samling Party (Nasjonal Samling)	4
Liberal Party (Venstre)	1
Total number of members:	20

=== Mayors ===
The mayor (Norwegian: ordfører) of Vadsø Municipality is the political leader of the municipality and the chairperson of the municipal council. Here is a list of people who have held this position:

- 1839–1842: Rev. Johan Fritzner
- 1843–1844: Peder Olsen
- 1845–1848: Christian August Engh
- 1849–1856: Peder Martin Bergwitz
- 1857–1891: Vilhelm Andersen
- 1892–1901: Emil Smith
- 1902–1904: Rev. Georg Balke
- 1905–1907: A. Ulve
- 1908–1908: H. Finstad
- 1909–1912: August Absalon Trasti (Ap)
- 1913–1913: Ananias Brune
- 1914–1914: Alf B. Bastiansen
- 1915–1915: Sigmund Brestesen Gjestland
- 1916–1916: Christian Opdahl
- 1917–1917: Guttorm Narum
- 1918–1919: August Absalon Trasti (Ap)
- 1920–1920: L. Hermansen
- 1921–1921: Andreas Brodtkorb Esbensen
- 1922–1923: Johan Grønvigh
- 1924–1925: Jakob Laurits Smith Bredrup
- 1926–1927: August Absalon Trasti (Ap)
- 1928–1929: Terje Wold (Ap)
- 1929–1931: August Absalon Trasti (Ap)
- 1932–1932: Richard Rasmussen
- 1933–1933: Andreas Brodtkorb Esbensen
- 1934–1936: Terje Wold (Ap)
- 1937–1945: Magnus Methi (Ap)
- 1953–1959: Anders Aune (Ap)
- 1962–1963: Jarle Johansen (Ap)
- 1964–1972: Henry Nikolai Karlsen (Ap)
- 1972–1979: Roger Hans Jenssen
- 1980–1983: Paul Rudolf Basma (Ap)
- 1984–1995: Aage Noren (Ap)
- 1995–2003: Anne Strifeldt (Ap)
- 2003–2007: Hauk Henrik Johnsen (Ap)
- 2007–2013: Svein Dragnes (Ap)
- 2014–2015: Rolf Arne Hanssen (SV)
- 2015–2019: Hans-Jacob Bønå (H)
- 2019–present: Wenche Pederson (Ap)

== Geography ==
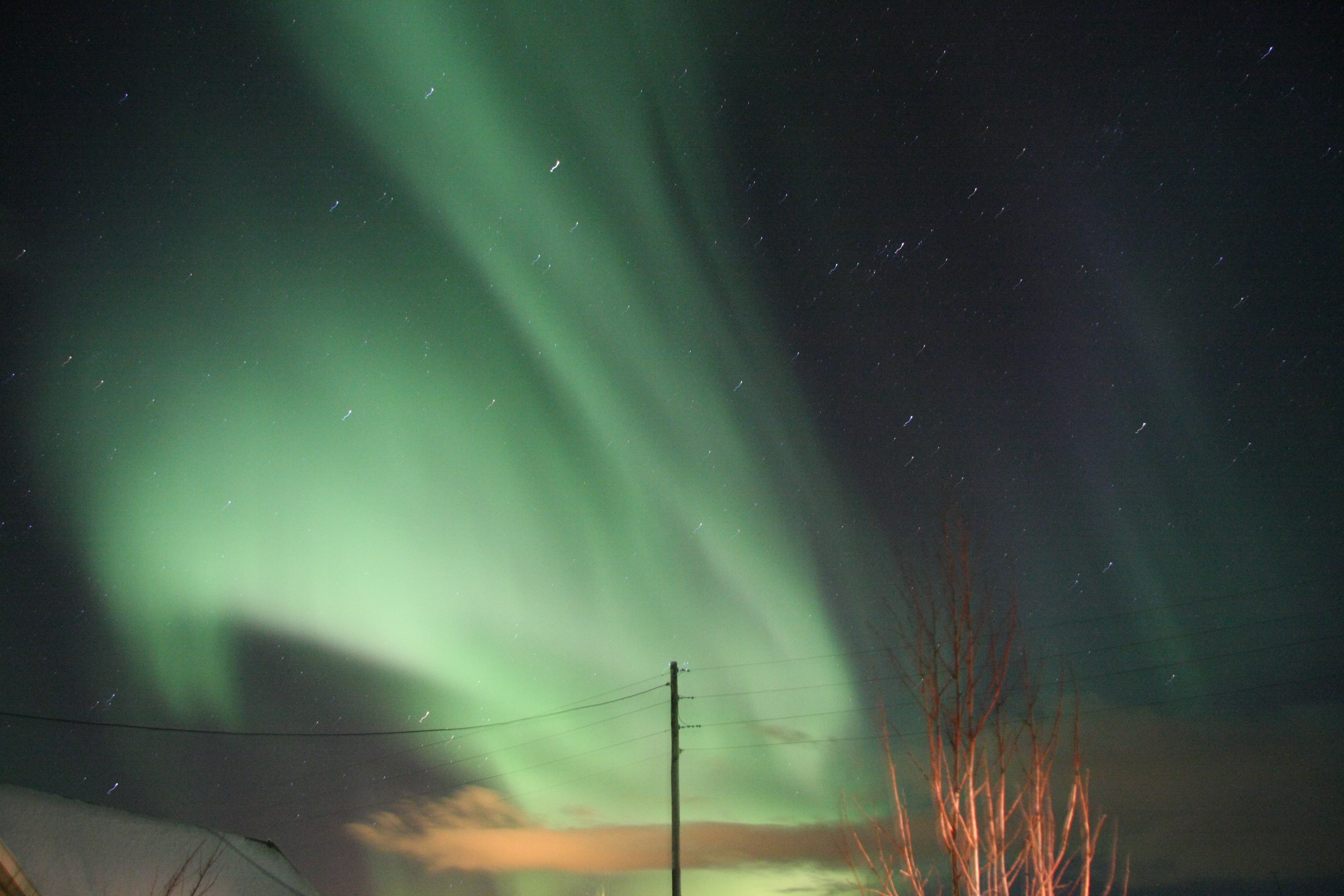
View of the northern lights

The municipality of Vadsø forms the southern coast of the Varanger Peninsula. The treeline lies at 100 m - 200 m ASL, highest at sheltered areas into the fjord away from the sea. There is no conifer forest in the municipality, the treeline is made up of birch forest, and willow shrubs are also common. The Varangerfjorden lies along the southern coast of the municipality and the river Jakobselva runs along the western border of Vadsø. The small islands of Lille Ekkerøy and Vadsøya lie in the Varangerfjorden. The Varangerhalvøya National Park lies in a large part of the interior parts of the municipality. The "midnight sun" is above the horizon from 17 May to 28 July (73 days), and the period with continuous daylight lasts a bit longer, polar night from 25 November to 17 January (54 days). The highest point in the municipality is the 633.85-metre (2,079.6 ft) tall mountain Skipskjølen.

=== Climate ===
Vadsø town has a subarctic climate, with long winters and a cool short summer. Part of the municipality is upland at the Varanger peninsula with alpine tundra climate above the treeline. According to data provided by Vadsø Airport, July is the warmest month with an average temperature of 10.9 °C (51.6 °F), while the average daytime temperature hovers around 15 °C (59 °F); on the contrary, February is the coldest, with the average temperature dropping to −6.1 °C (21.0 °F). The annual precipitation is about 410 millimetres (16 in). Spring is a relatively dry season, and precipitation is mainly concentrated in late summer and early autumn. Extreme temperatures ranged from −24.6 °C (−12.3 °F) on February 6, 2012, to 31.0 °C (87.8 °F) on July 19, 2018.

Climate data for Vadsø, (Note: Temperature, dew point, average humidity and snow depth data were measured at Vadsø Airport, while precipitation data were only recorded at Ekkerøy weather station between 1925 and 1972.) 1991–2020 normals, extremes 1957–present (Note: The extreme temperature data from 1957 to 1972 is provided by Ekkerøy weather station, while the extreme temperature data from 2002 to the present comes from Vadsø Airport.)
Month	Jan	Feb	Mar	Apr	May	Jun	Jul	Aug	Sep	Oct	Nov	Dec	Year
Record high °C (°F)	5.7 (42.3)	6.8 (44.2)	7.0 (44.6)	13.2 (55.8)	23.0 (73.4)	30.0 (86.0)	31.0 (87.8)	27.5 (81.5)	21.4 (70.5)	13.4 (56.1)	10 (50)	6.5 (43.7)	31.0 (87.8)
Mean maximum °C (°F)	3.1 (37.6)	2.9 (37.2)	3.2 (37.8)	7.4 (45.3)	15.7 (60.3)	19.7 (67.5)	23.4 (74.1)	21.3 (70.3)	16.0 (60.8)	9.4 (48.9)	5.2 (41.4)	3.9 (39.0)	24.5 (76.1)
Mean daily maximum °C (°F)	−3.3 (26.1)	−3.6 (25.5)	−1.8 (28.8)	2.3 (36.1)	7.2 (45.0)	11.3 (52.3)	15.1 (59.2)	13.8 (56.8)	10.3 (50.5)	4.2 (39.6)	0.7 (33.3)	−1.2 (29.8)	4.6 (40.3)
Daily mean °C (°F)	−5.8 (21.6)	−6.1 (21.0)	−4.2 (24.4)	−0.7 (30.7)	3.6 (38.5)	7.5 (45.5)	10.9 (51.6)	10.2 (50.4)	7.3 (45.1)	1.9 (35.4)	−2.0 (28.4)	−3.6 (25.5)	1.6 (34.9)
Mean daily minimum °C (°F)	−9.1 (15.6)	−9.4 (15.1)	−7.4 (18.7)	−3.5 (25.7)	1.0 (33.8)	5.0 (41.0)	8.3 (46.9)	7.4 (45.3)	4.4 (39.9)	−0.2 (31.6)	−4.0 (24.8)	−6.5 (20.3)	−1.2 (29.8)
Mean minimum °C (°F)	−17.1 (1.2)	−16.9 (1.6)	−15.0 (5.0)	−11.2 (11.8)	−4.1 (24.6)	0.7 (33.3)	4.1 (39.4)	1.9 (35.4)	−1.4 (29.5)	−7.2 (19.0)	−11.3 (11.7)	−13.8 (7.2)	−19.6 (−3.3)
Record low °C (°F)	−20.3 (−4.5)	−24.6 (−12.3)	−20.3 (−4.5)	−15.7 (3.7)	−11.0 (12.2)	−2.5 (27.5)	−0.1 (31.8)	−2.0 (28.4)	−5.4 (22.3)	−13.6 (7.5)	−15.1 (4.8)	−19.1 (−2.4)	−24.6 (−12.3)
Average precipitation mm (inches)	31.2 (1.23)	27.3 (1.07)	28.3 (1.11)	24.0 (0.94)	23.2 (0.91)	33.5 (1.32)	47.3 (1.86)	51.5 (2.03)	45.3 (1.78)	36.7 (1.44)	32.3 (1.27)	30.0 (1.18)	410.8 (16.17)
Average extreme snow depth cm (inches)	58 (23)	75 (30)	83 (33)	69 (27)	15 (5.9)	0 (0)	0 (0)	0 (0)	0 (0)	2 (0.8)	13 (5.1)	36 (14)	101 (40)
Average precipitation days (≥ 1.0 mm)	11.0	9.1	8.1	6.6	6.3	6.8	10.1	11.1	8.6	10.5	9.7	9.7	107.6
Average relative humidity (%)	83	82	78	78	76	76	81	82	83	84	84	84	81
Average dew point °C (°F)	−8.5 (16.7)	−8.6 (16.5)	−7.2 (19.0)	−3.6 (25.5)	0.3 (32.5)	3.9 (39.0)	8.2 (46.8)	7.5 (45.5)	5.1 (41.2)	−0.2 (31.6)	−3.7 (25.3)	−5.5 (22.1)	−1.0 (30.2)
Source 1: Norwegian Meteorological Institute (extreme snow depth, dew point and humidity 1991-2020, precipitation 1925-1972 and extremes)
Source 2: NOAA WMO averages 91-2020 Norway

== Wildlife ==
=== Birdlife ===
Situated on the shores of the Varangerfjorden the municipality of Vadsø is known for its birdlife. Many of its coastal localities like Store Ekkerøy are internationally known for its rich and interesting birdlife. The harbor at Vadsø can produce all three species of eider, including the small Steller's eider.

=== River fishing ===
Fishing permits (for salmon fishing) are sold for use on specific rivers, including Komag-elva.

== Transportation ==
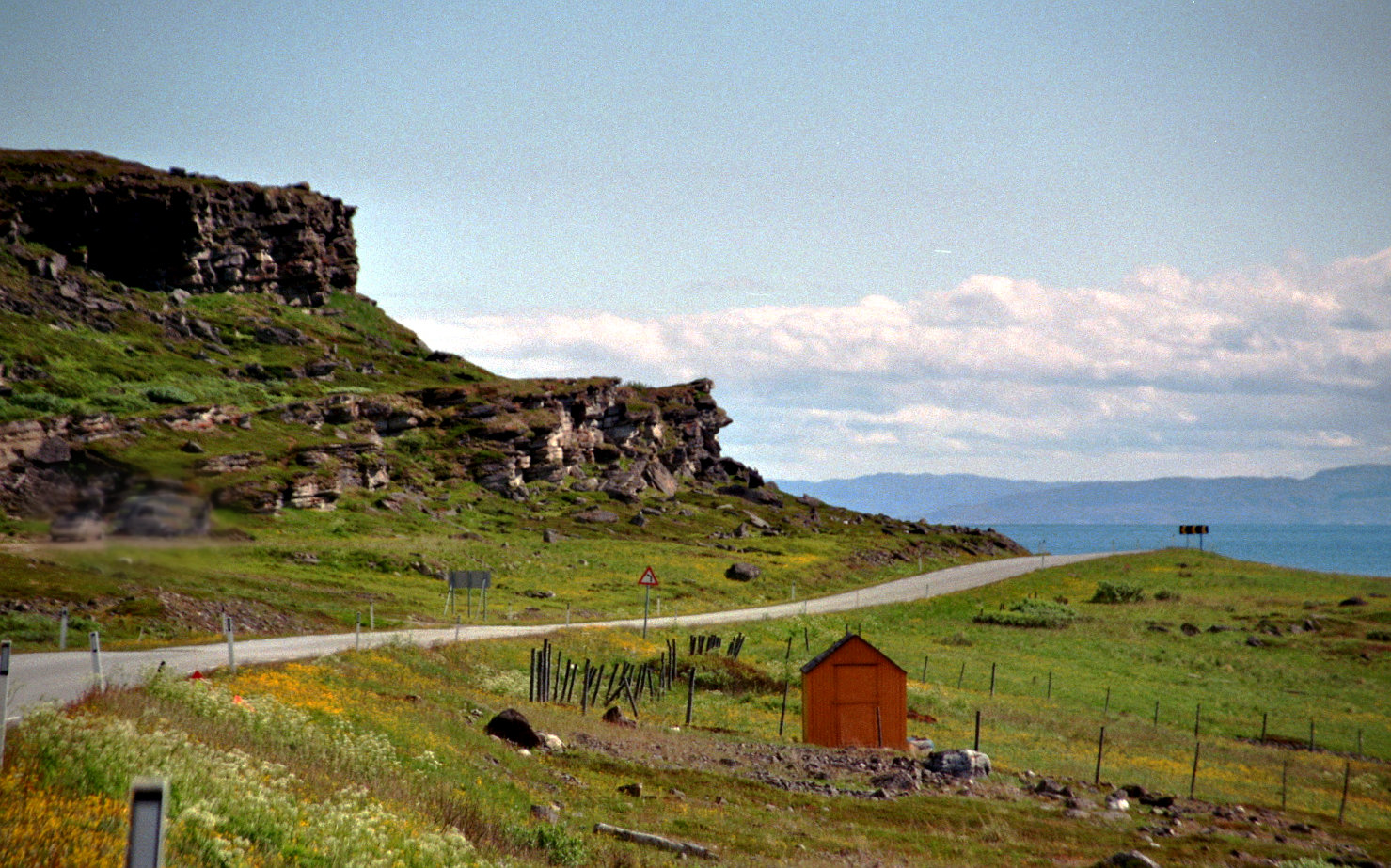
E75 in Vadsø municipality

Vadsø Airport is located in Kiby, just to the east of the town. The town is also a port of call for the Hurtigruten coastal express boats. Vadsø is located along the European route E75 highway.

== Economy ==
The service industries have more impact on employment than the total of farming, fishing and the manufacturing industry. The city has suppliers to the regional construction industries, including a concrete works. One bookstore exists (2023).

== Notable people ==
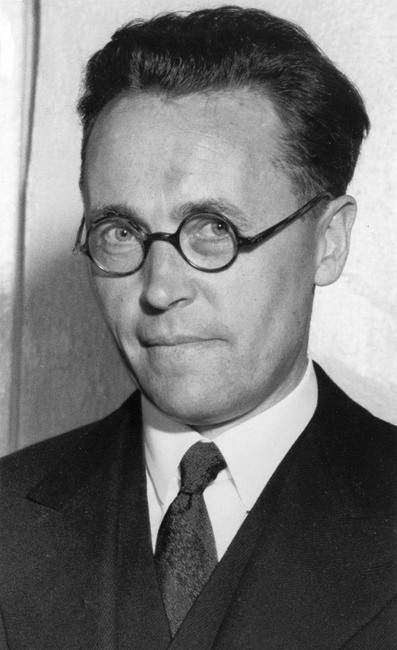
Terje Wold, 1935

- Mathias Bonsach Krogh (1754 in Vadsø – 1828), a clergyman who was the first Bishop of Hålogaland
- Sigurd Kloumann (1879 in Vadsø – 1953), an engineer and hydropower developer
- Terje Wold (1899 – 1972), a politician, mayor of Vadsø in the 1930s, and the 15th Chief Justice of the Supreme Court from 1958 to 1969
- Anders John Aune (1923 – 2011), a politician who was mayor of Vadsø in the 1950s
- Einar Niemi (born 1943 in Nord-Varanger), a historian of the cultural heritage of Northern Norway
- Harald Norvik (born 1946 in Vadsø), the former CEO of Statoil, Telenor & ConocoPhillips
- Bodil Niska (born 1954 in Vadsø), a jazz musician who plays the saxophone
- Harald Devold (1964–2016), a jazz musician who lived in Vadsø from 1995
- Stig Henrik Hoff (born 1965 in Vadsø), an actor
- Ingvild Aleksandersen (born 1968 in Vadsø), a lawyer who was County Governor of Finnmark county 2016 to 2018

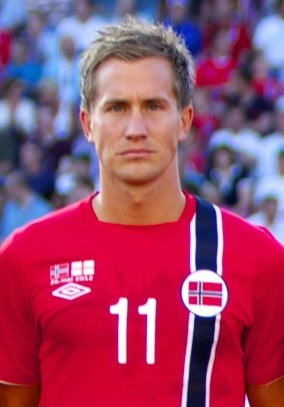
Morten Gamst Pedersen, 2012

=== Sport ===
- Aage Steen (1900 in Vadsø – 1982), a boxer who competed in the 1920 Summer Olympics
- Lars Bohinen (born 1969 in Vadsø), a former professional footballer with 355 club caps and 49 for Norway
- Sigurd Rushfeldt (born 1972 in Vadsø), a football coach and former player with 485 club caps and 38 for Norway
- Morten Gamst Pedersen (born 1981 in Vadsø), a professional footballer with over 500 club caps and 83 for Norway
- Kristin Harila, a mountaineer who climbed the 14 tallest mountains in the world and setting multiple world speed records

== International relations ==
=== Twin towns — Sister cities ===
Vadsø is twinned with the following cities:

- – Holstebro, Denmark
- – Karkkila, Finland
- – Kemijärvi, Finland
- – Murmansk, Russia
- – Oxelösund, Sweden
