= Vadsøya =

Island in Norway

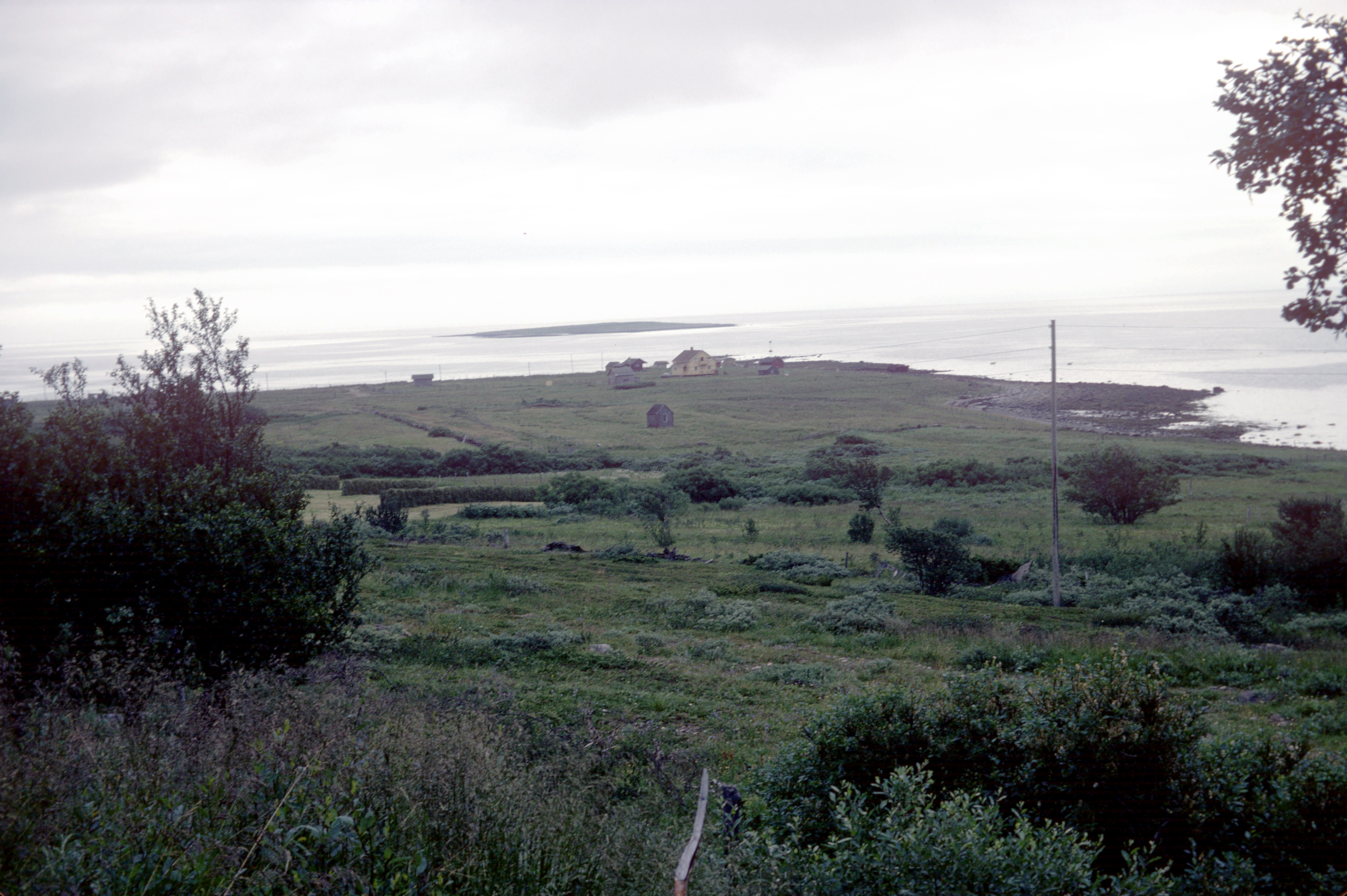

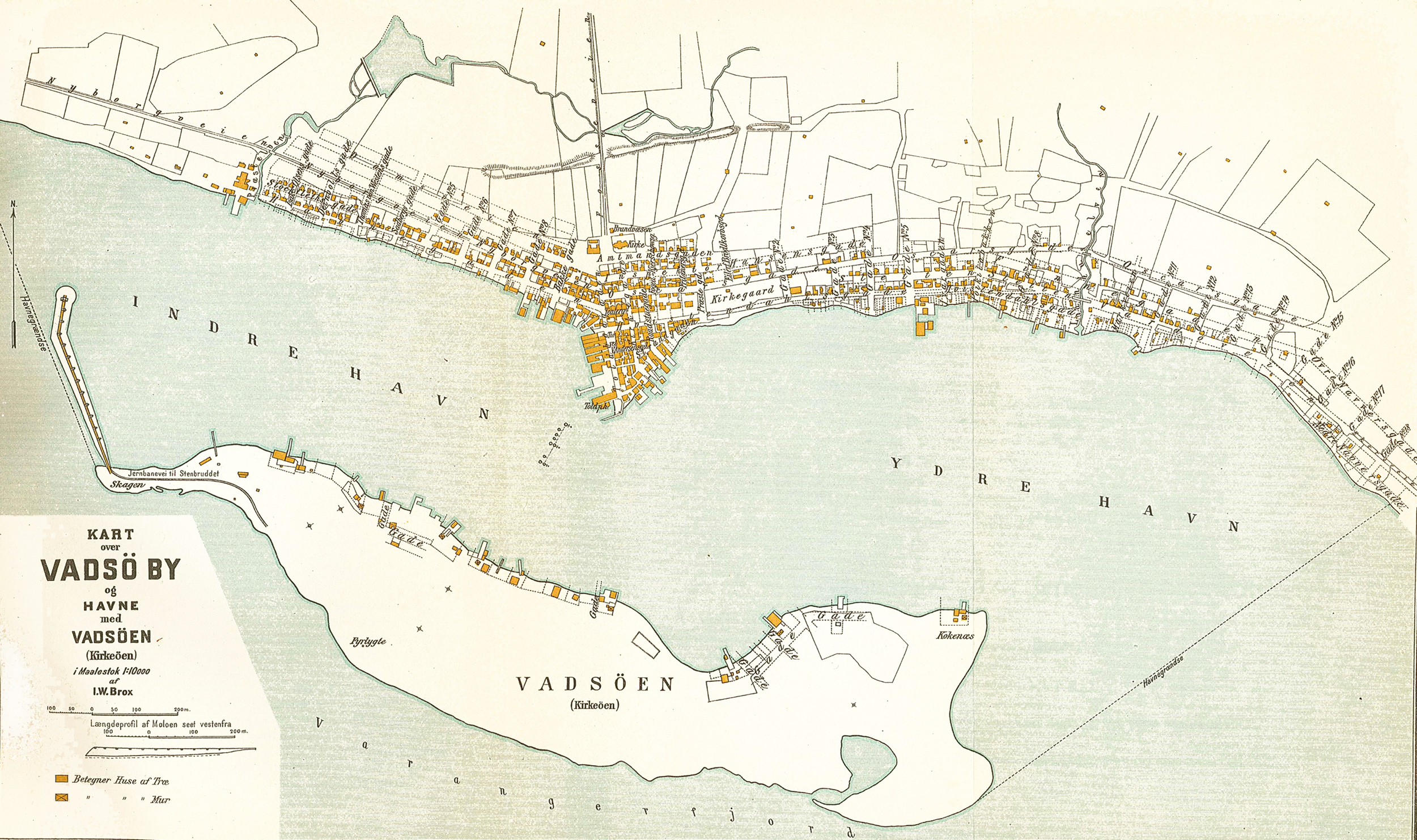
- Historic map showing Vadsøya within the town of Vadsø (from 1905)

- Location of the island Vadsøya (Norway)

Geography
- Location: Finnmark, Norway
- Coordinates: 70.0668°N 29.7473°E
- Area: 0.8 km^{2} (0.31 sq mi)
- Length: 2.2 km (1.37 mi)
- Width: 600 km (370 mi)
- Highest elevation: 8 m (26 ft)

Administration
- Norway
- County: Finnmark
- Municipality: Vadsø Municipality

Vadsøya is an island in Vadsø Municipality in Finnmark county, Norway. The island lies in the Varangerfjorden, just south of the coast of the mainland Varanger Peninsula. The island is part of the town of Vadsø. The 0.8-square-kilometre (200-acre; 80-hectare) island is connected to the mainland by a bridge that branches off the European route E75 highway in the centre of the town of Vadsø. The Hurtigruten coastal express boats dock on Vadsøya.

The island was the original location of what is now the town of Vadsø. In the 17th century, the residents moved over to the mainland where the town was expanded. The island was also the site of the old Vadsø Church until it was moved in the early 18th century to the new townsite of Vadsø on the mainland.

== See also ==
- List of islands of Norway
