= Vestre Jakobselv =

Vestre Jakobselv (Norwegian); Ánnejohka (Northern Sami); Annijoki (Kven)
- Village
- Interactive map of: Vestre Jakobselv (Norwegian); Ánnejohka (Northern Sami); Annijoki (Kven)
- Location within Finnmark Location within Norway
- Coordinates: 70°06′41″N 29°20′00″E
- Country: Norway
- Region: Northern Norway
- County: Finnmark
- District: Øst-Finnmark
- Municipality: Vadsø Municipality

Area
  - Total: 0.77 km^{2} (0.30 sq mi)
- Elevation: 9 m (30 ft)

Population (2023)
  - Total: 475
  - Density: 617/km^{2} (1,600/sq mi)
- Time zone: UTC+01:00 (CET)
  - Summer (DST): UTC+02:00 (CEST)
- Post Code: 9802 Vestre Jakobselv

Vestre Jakobselv (Norwegian), Ánnejohka (Northern Sami), or Annijoki (Kven) is a village in Vadsø Municipality in Finnmark county, in extreme northeastern Norway. The village lies along the European route E75 highway about 17 kilometres (11 mi) west of the town of Vadsø and the same distance east of the village of Nesseby in neighboring Nesseby Municipality.

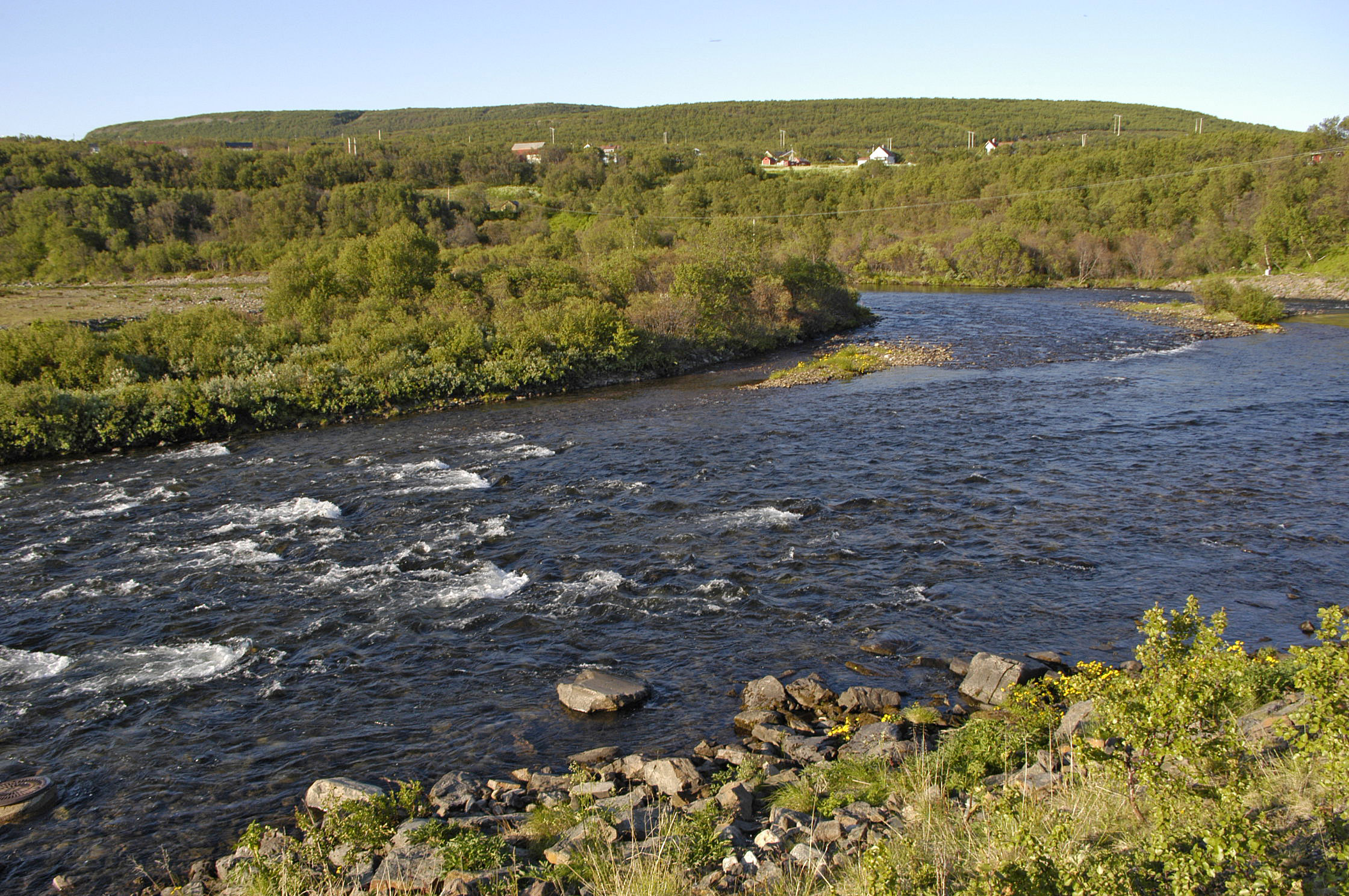
View of the Jakobselva river, north of the village

The village is located on the southern shore of the large mainland Varanger Peninsula at the mouth of the river Jakobselva, which is where the village gets its name. The river empties into the Varangerfjorden at this village. Upstream from the village, the Jakobselva river is known to be a superb sport fishing river, with a lot of big salmon. The river winds its way down from the mountains through a lush birch wood valley all the way to the fjord.

The 0.77-square-kilometre (190-acre) village has a population (2023) of 475 which gives the village a population density of 617 inhabitants per square kilometre (1,600/sq mi).

Vestre Jakobselv is home to the Third Division soccer club, IL Polarstjernen. The Vestre Jakobselv Church is located in the village, serving the western part of the municipality.

The local elementary school, Vestre Jakobselv oppvekstsenter, no longer has (as of Q4 2022) an order that tells the school to close.
