= Kiby =

- Village
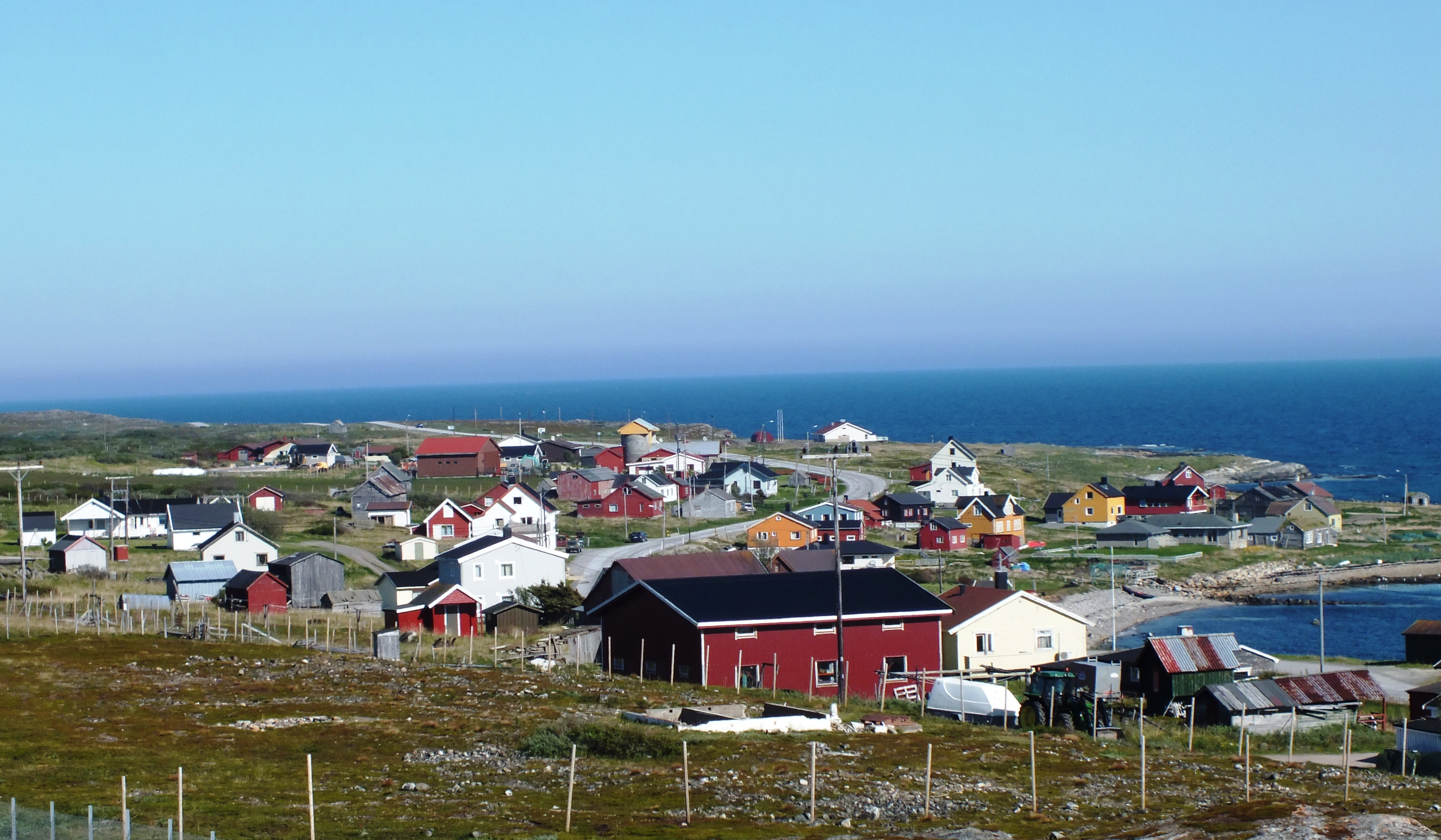
- View of the village
- Interactive map of Kiby
- Location within Finnmark Location within Norway
- Coordinates: 70°03′44″N 29°51′26″E
- Country: Norway
- Region: Northern Norway
- County: Finnmark
- District: Øst-Finnmark
- Municipality: Vadsø Municipality
- Elevation: 12 m (39 ft)
- Time zone: UTC+01:00 (CET)
  - Summer (DST): UTC+02:00 (CEST)
- Post Code: 9800 Vadsø

Kiby is a village in Vadsø Municipality in Finnmark county, Norway. It is located along the Varangerfjorden and European route E75, about 4 kilometres (2.5 mi) east of the town of Vadsø. The fishing village had a population of 39 in 2003, although it had a population of 208 in 1891. Vadsø Airport, which opened on 1 August 1974, is located at Kiby.

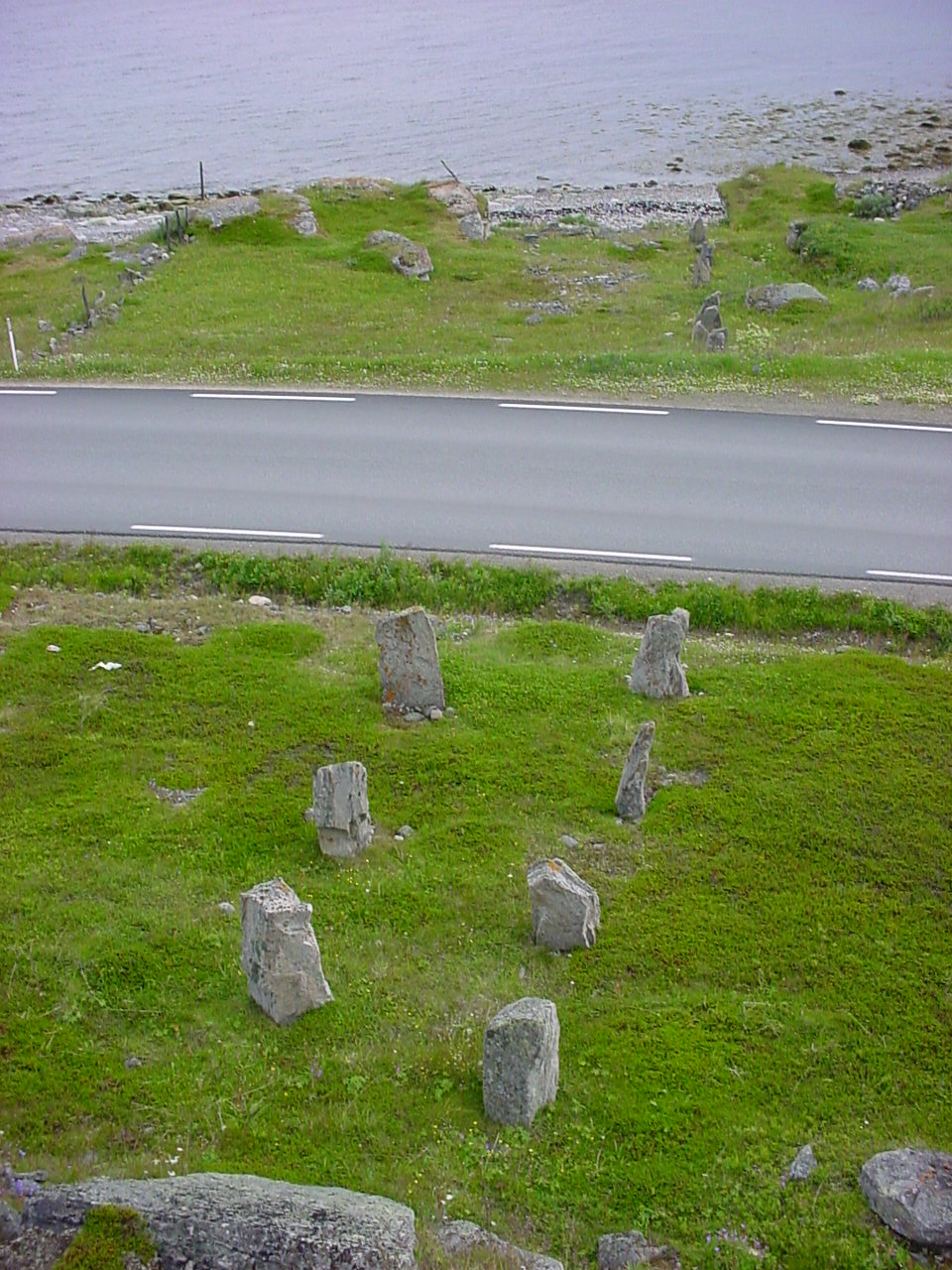
Megaliths at Kiby

Norwegian-American poet Julius Berg Johannesen was born in Kiby in 1869. He immigrated to the US in 1891, where he published three books with poems.
