= Vestre Jakobselv Church =

- Vestre Jakobselv kirke
- Vestre Jakobselv Church
- 70.111389°N 29.333611°E
- Location: Vadsø Municipality, Finnmark
- Country: Norway
- Denomination: Church of Norway
- Churchmanship: Evangelical Lutheran

History
- Status: Parish church
- Founded: 1940
- Consecrated: 1940

Architecture
- Functional status: Active
- Architect: Riksarkitekten
- Architectural type: Long church
- Completed: 1940 (86 years ago)

Specifications
- Capacity: 90
- Materials: Wood

Administration
- Diocese: Nord-Hålogaland
- Deanery: Varanger prosti
- Parish: Vadsø
- Norwegian Cultural Heritage Site
- Type: Church
- Status: Listed
- ID: 85818

Vestre Jakobselv Church (Norwegian: Vestre Jakobselv kirke) is a parish church of the Church of Norway in Vadsø Municipality in Finnmark county, Norway. It is located in the village of Vestre Jakobselv. It is one of the churches for the Vadsø parish which is part of the Varanger prosti (deanery) in the Diocese of Nord-Hålogaland. The white, wooden church was built in a long church style in 1940. The church seats about 90 people. The building was designed by the Statens bygnignsinspektorat, a government agency now known as the Norwegian Directorate of Public Construction and Property. The church holds regularly scheduled worship services every other Sunday.

== See also ==
- List of churches in Nord-Hålogaland
