= Skallelv =

Skallelv (Norwegian); Gállojohka (Northern Sami); Kallijoki (Kven)
- Village
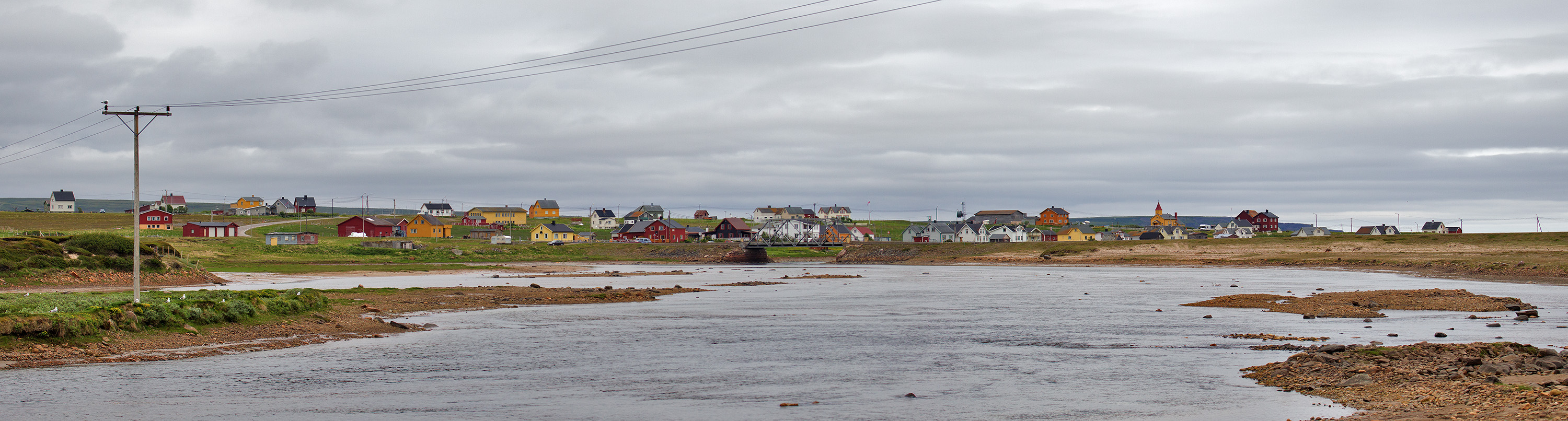
- View of the village
- Interactive map of: Skallelv (Norwegian); Gállojohka (Northern Sami); Kallijoki (Kven)
- Location within Finnmark Location within Norway
- Coordinates: 70°11′21″N 30°20′06″E
- Country: Norway
- Region: Northern Norway
- County: Finnmark
- District: Øst-Finnmark
- Municipality: Vadsø Municipality
- Elevation: 18 m (59 ft)
- Time zone: UTC+01:00 (CET)
  - Summer (DST): UTC+02:00 (CEST)
- Post Code: 9800 Vadsø

Skallelv (Norwegian), Gállojohka (Northern Sami), or Kallijoki (Kven) is a village in Vadsø Municipality in Finnmark county, Norway. It is located on the southeastern coast of the Varanger Peninsula, along the Varangerfjorden. The European route E75 highway runs through the village, about halfway between the villages of Komagvær and Krampenes. Skallelv Church is located in the village.

Historically, Skallelv has been inhabited by the Sami and the Kven populations, and more recently by newcomers from the more southern parts of Norway and Finland. Skallelv is one of the very few villages in Finnmark county that wasn't burned to the ground by the German troops at the end of World War II. Some of the wooden buildings there date back to 1860 or older.

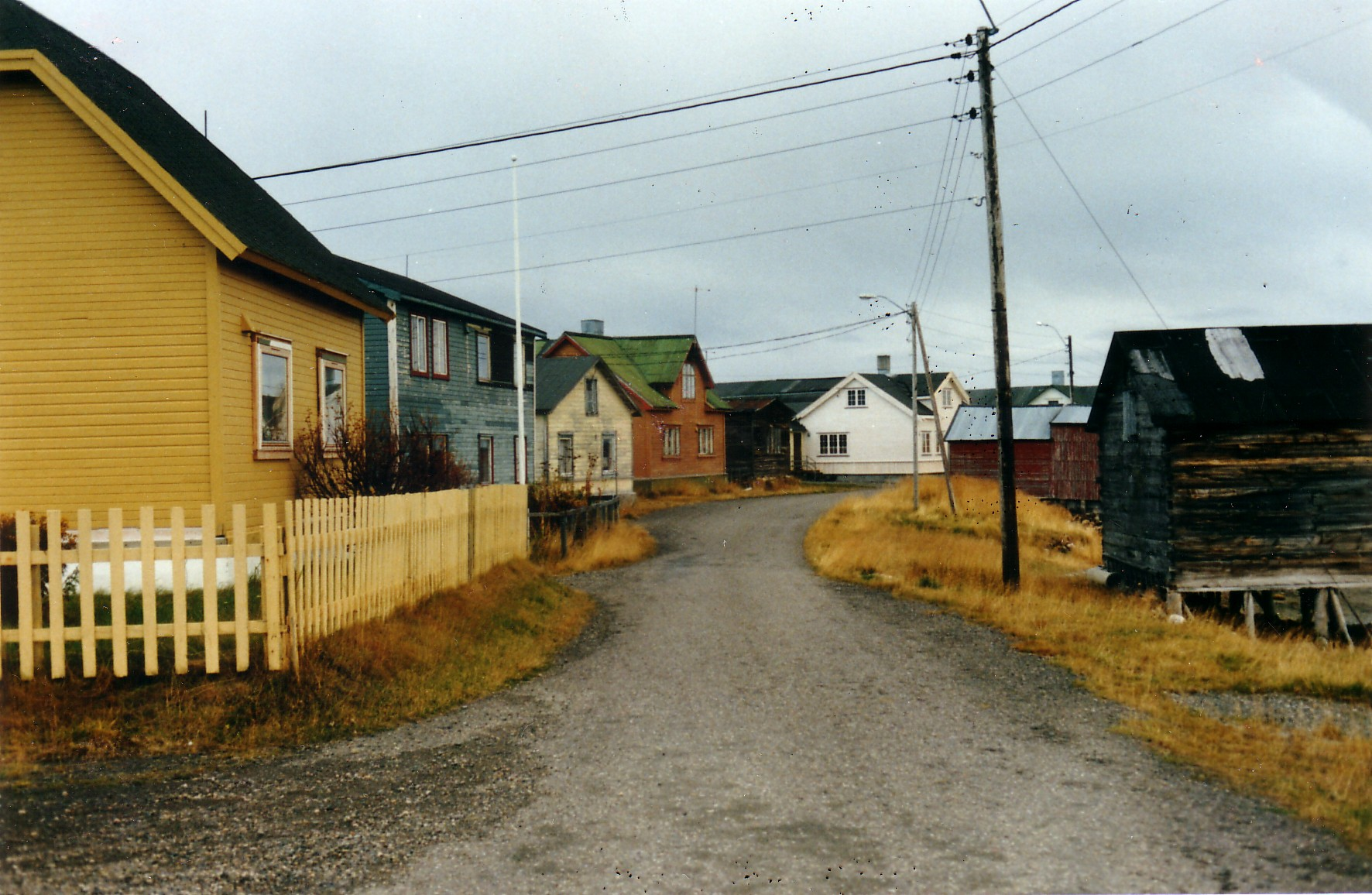
Street in Skallelv
