= Henry Karlsen =

Norwegian politician

Henry Nikolai Karlsen (15 April 1912 – 11 October 1975) was a Norwegian politician for the Labour Party.

He served as a deputy representative to the Norwegian Parliament from Finnmark during the terms 1950–1953, 1958–1961 and 1961–1965.

Born in Nord-Varanger Municipality, Karlsen was mayor of Nord-Varanger Municipality from 1945 to 1963. When the municipality was incorporated into Vadsø Municipality, Karlsen was mayor of that municipality from 1963 to 1972. A member of the county committee in Finnmark from 1951, he became the first county mayor in 1963, and served until his death in 1975.

Outside politics he worked as a local bureaucrat from 1953 to 1968, and as a fisher and farmer.

New office	County mayor of Finnmark; 1963–1975	Succeeded by Axel Samuelsberg
