= Vadsø Airport =

Airport in Vadsø, Finnmark, Norway

Vadsø Airport Vadsø lufthavn

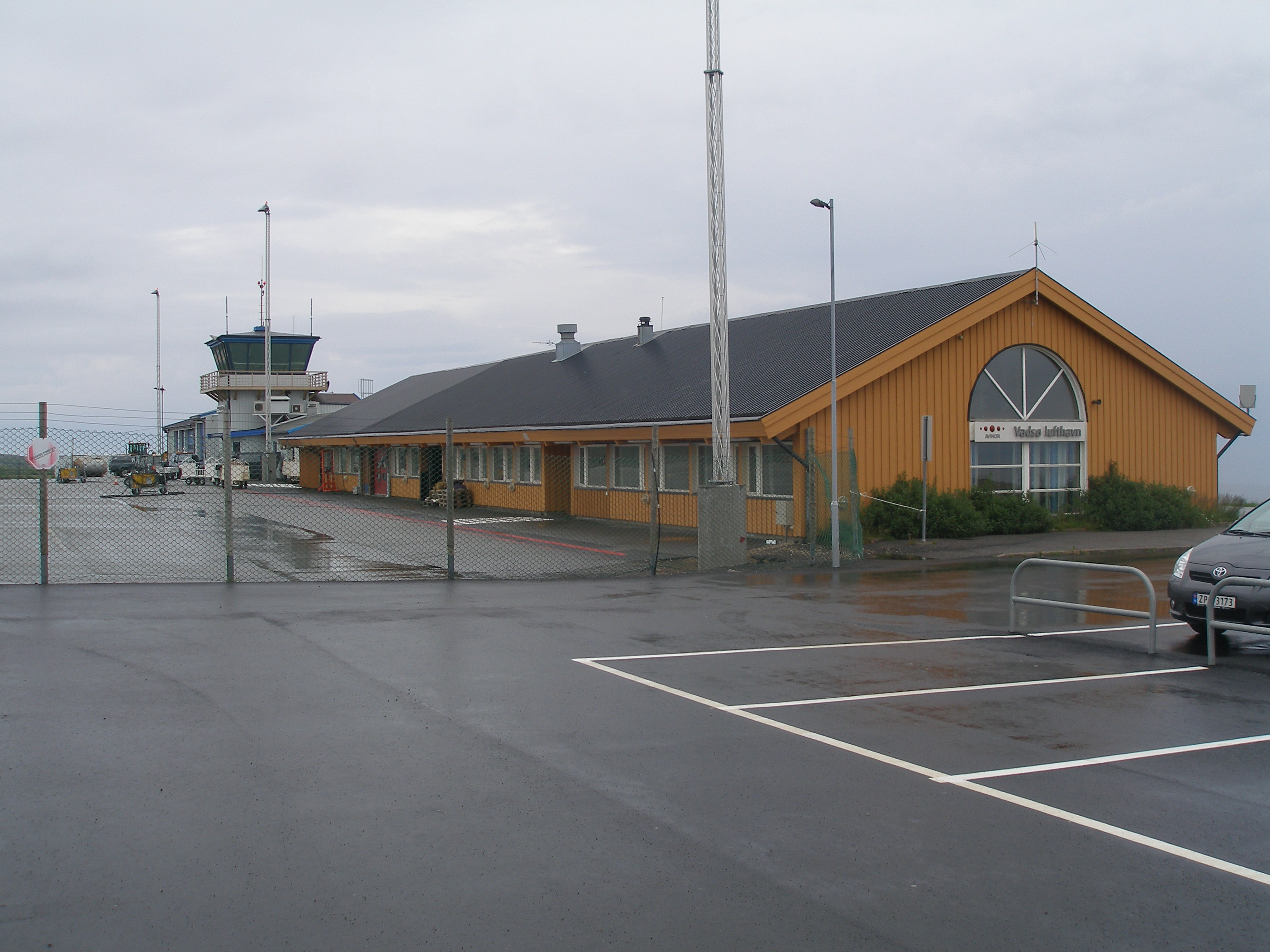
- IATA: VDS; ICAO: ENVD

Summary
- Airport type: Public
- Operator: Avinor
- Serves: Vadsø
- Location: Kiby, Vadsø, Norway
- Elevation AMSL: 39 m / 127 ft
- Coordinates: 70°03′55″N 029°50′41″E
- Website: avinor.no

Map
- Location in Norway

Runways
Direction	Length		Surface
Direction	m	ft	Surface
08/26	997	3,271	Asphalt

Statistics (2014)
- Passengers: 77,348
- Aircraft movements: 6,967
- Cargo (tonnes): 294

Vadsø Airport (Norwegian: Vadsø lufthavn; IATA: VDS, ICAO: ENVD) is a regional airport in Vadsø Municipality in Finnmark county, Norway. The airport is located in the village of Kiby, 4 kilometers (2.5 mi) east of the town of Vadsø along the Varangerfjorden. The airport is operated by the state-owned Avinor and handled 77,348 passengers in 2014. The asphalt runway is 997 meters (3,271 ft) long. Services are provided by Widerøe using Dash 8-100 aircraft to other communities in Finnmark and to Tromsø International Airport. The routes are subsidized by the Ministry of Transport and Communications through public service obligations.

Vadsø was during the late 1930s and from the mid-1940s served with a seaplane route operated by Widerøe and Norwegian Air Lines. Planning of an airport started in the mid-1960s, with the airport opening in 1974. It was originally served both by Widerøe and by Norving, the latter to Båtsfjord Airport and providing air ambulance services. The airport received a major upgrade, with a hangar and larger terminal, ahead of the 1984 introduction of the de Havilland Canada Dash 7.

== History ==
The first seaplane route to Vadsø was started by Widerøe in 1938, which flew along the coast south to Trondheim. The route was interrupted by World War II, but resumed in 1946, when it was flown by Norwegian Air Lines using the Junkers Ju 52. The water aerodrome in Vadsø was simple and consisted of a designated landing area and a buoy, with passengers having to be boated out to the aircraft. From 1954 the route was taken over by Widerøe, who introduced the de Havilland Canada Otter. From 1962 to 1963, Varangfly (later renamed Norving) flew a seaplane route to Kirkenes and Båtsfjord. They applied for concessions to operate a route from 1964, but the government was not willing issue to necessary subsidies.

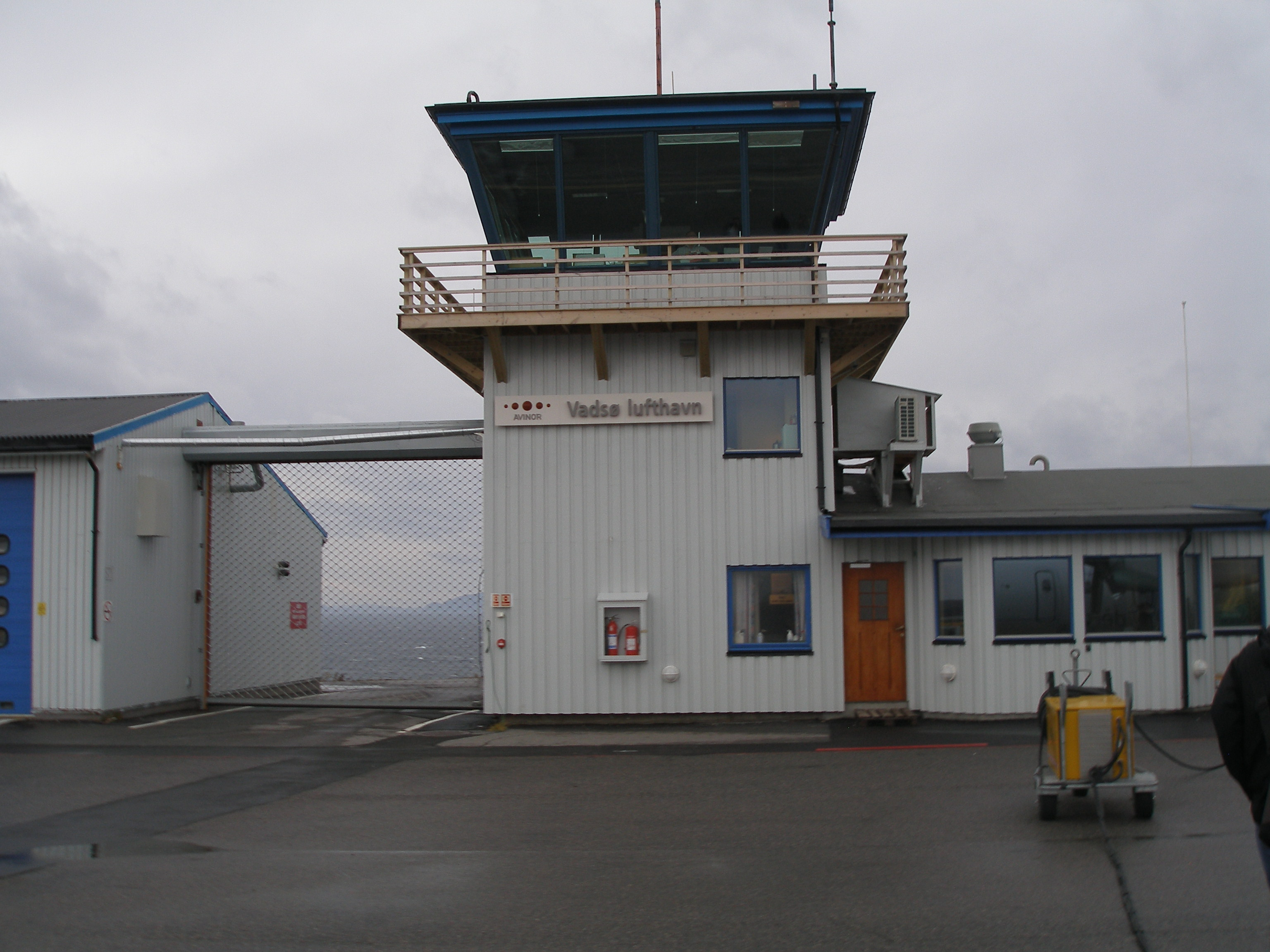
The control tower

Varangfly proposed Vadsø as a possible site of a small airfield in 1964, suitable for landing air taxis and air ambulances. A county-appointed committee recommended in 1966 that Vadsø be one of six locations of airfields. Planning of a national network of regional airports started in the 1960s. At the time a bus ride from Vadsø to Kirkenes Airport, Høybuktmoen took seven hours. Vadsø was selected as one of five initial locations in northern Troms and Finnmark which received regional airports. This was the fourth and final stage of the regional airport implementation. The Civil Aviation Administration (CAA, later renamed Avinor) considered two locations for the airport: at Fossemyrene just north of the town center, and at Kiby, 4 kilometers (2.5 mi) east of the town. The latter was preferred. An aviation club was founded in 1971 and used a field at Karlebotn. They moved to the frozen lake of Navarsvannet during the winter before moving to Golnes from the summer of 1972. The airfield at Golnes was created by leveling a moraine ridge. Norving used Golnes for ambulance and taxi services from 1972 until Vadsø Airport opened.

Both Widerøe and Norving applied to operate the Finnmark route, which would connect the airports together and to the primary airports in Finnmark and Tromsø Airport. Norving planned to operate with their Britten-Norman Islanders and Britten-Norman Trislanders. The government opted to selected Widerøe and their Twin Otters, citing the need for a single operator for all subsidized regional routes in the country. Vadsø Airport opened on 1 August 1974 at the same time as Sørkjosen Airport, Hammerfest Airport, Mehamn Airport and Berlevåg Airport. The airport featured a combined control tower and terminal, which had a capacity for 30 people. Twin Otters landed at Vadsø four times daily. Norving started a service from Kirkenes via Vadsø to Båtsfjord Airport in January 1975. However, they did not have permission to fly passengers between Vadsø and Kirkenes. Widerøe introduced the de Havilland Canada Dash 7 in 1984, which required an upgrade to the airport. Specifically a new 350-square-meter (3,800 sq ft) terminal building was built along with a 1,000-square-meter (11,000 sq ft) hangar. For a short period the airport had a cafe. Widerøe took over Norving's Båtsfjord service in 1990.

Widerøe operated Twin Otters on the route until 1995, when the Dash 8 was introduced. The state and the Civil Aviation Administration took over ownership and operations of the airport from 1 January 1997, in exchange for NOK 4.1 million being paid to Vadsø Municipality. Flights to Mehman have been subject to public service obligations since 1 April 1997. The CAA articulated in 1999 plans to extend the runway to 1,200 meters (3,900 ft), but this was never followed up. The government proposed in 2002 that Vardø Airport be closed, citing the proximity to Vadsø (69 km/43 mi); the closing was never carried. Airport security was introduced on 1 January 2005. The navigational aids and runway were upgraded in 2007.

== Facilities ==
The airport is located at Kiby, 4 kilometers (2.5 mi) east of the town center of Vadsø. The terminal has a capacity of 170 passengers per hour and can handle two simultaneous Dash 8-100 aircraft. The asphalt runway is 880 meters (2,890 ft) long and aligned 08–26, roughly east–west, and equipped with a SCAT-I landing system, based on the Global Positioning System. The airport has paid parking, a taxi stand and five car rental companies. The airport area is cramped and there is little room for further expansion. Should the airport be expanded in the future a new terminal is needed, since it is located too close to the runway according to safety rules. It is planned to in that case place it southeast of the present terminal. An alternative is to build a new airport somewhere between Vadsø and Vardø which would serve both towns (the distance to a halfway point between the cities is 37 km (23 mi)).

== Airlines and destinations ==
Vadsø is served by Widerøe, which operates 39-seat Dash 8-100 aircraft to other communities in Finnmark. The routes are operated as public service obligations financed by the Ministry of Transport and Communications. The airport served 77,348 passengers, 6,967 aircraft movements and handled 294 tonnes of cargo in 2014.

The distance from Vadsø Airport to Kirkenes Airport, Høybuktmoen is 38 kilometers (24 mi) by air and 165 kilometers (103 mi) by road. For the year starting on 1 April 2008 this segment had 12,136 passengers to Kirkenes and 9,573 from Kirkenes. A large portion of these transfer to Oslo-bound flights at Høybuktmoen. The driving time from Vadsø to Kirkenes is between two and three hours, as the road runs around Varangerfjorden. There is a proposal that a fast ferry service could start on the route, or even a tunnel to be built. Another proposal is to improve the road to mostly allow 90 km/h, the highest allowed speed limit on ordinary roads in Norway, giving two hours drive time. The road to Vardø (70 km) also has such a proposal, if the Vardø Airport is to be closed as suggested. But no such road improvement, speedboat or tunnel proposal is under detailed investigation as of 2021.

Airlines	Destinations
Widerøe	Alta, Båtsfjord, Berlevåg, Hammerfest, Honningsvåg, Kirkenes, Mehamn, Sørkjosen, Tromsø, Vardø

== Statistics ==
Annual passenger traffic
Year	Passengers	% Change
2025	80,540	▲1.6%
2024	79,306	▼ -18.9%
2023	97,803	▼ -2.8%
2022	100,645	▲15.8%
2021	86,914	▲19,5%
2020	72,750	▼ -28.0%
2019	100,992	▲0.6%
2018	100,395	▼ -3.2%
2017	103,678	▼ -1.0%
2016	104,697	▲2.4%
2015	102,215	

== Accidents and incidents ==
On 4 January 1984 a Cessna aircraft crashed into the sea after take-off from the airport. Three people were killed, although no bodies or the wreck were found, only parts. Because the airport was not staffed at the time of the accident, it was not reported until fourteen hours after it occurred.
