= Sigurd Kloumann =

Norwegian engineer (1879–1953)

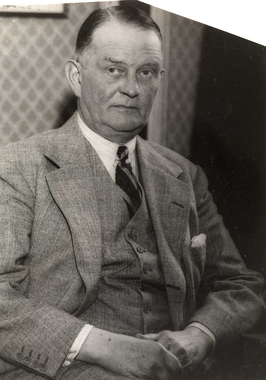
- Born: 1 July 1879; Vadsø, Norway
- Died: 18 January 1953 (aged 73)
- Occupation: Engineer
- Awards: Order of St. Olav; Order of Vasa

Sigurd Kloumann (1 July 1879 – 18 January 1953) was a Norwegian engineer, hydropower developer and industrial leader.

Kloumann was born in Vadsø to Fredrik Julius Kloumann and Karen Johanne Anker Løwold. He was manager of Notodden salpeterfabrikk from 1904 to 1912, for Saudefaldene from 1913, and for Norsk Aluminium Company (NACO) from 1916 to 1945. He was decorated Knight, First Class of the Order of St. Olav in 1911, and was a Commander of the Swedish Order of Vasa.

In 1940 NACO was the largest producer of aluminium in Norway. During the German occupation of Norway, NACO collaborated with the occupants, and the company and its leaders were subject to investigation in the subsequent legal purge.

Kloumann was a fellow of the Norwegian Academy of Science and Letters from 1925 as well as a fellow of the Royal Swedish Academy of Sciences.
