= Skallelv Chapel =

- Skallelv kapell
- Skallelv Chapel
- 70.187485°N 30.341372°E
- Location: Vadsø Municipality, Finnmark
- Country: Norway
- Denomination: Church of Norway
- Churchmanship: Evangelical Lutheran

History
- Status: Chapel
- Founded: 1961
- Consecrated: 1961

Architecture
- Functional status: Active
- Architect: Rolf Harlew Jenssen
- Architectural type: Long church
- Completed: 1961 (65 years ago)

Specifications
- Capacity: 78
- Materials: Wood

Administration
- Diocese: Nord-Hålogaland
- Deanery: Varanger prosti
- Parish: Vadsø
- Norwegian Cultural Heritage Site
- Type: Church
- Status: Not protected
- ID: 85443

Skallelv Chapel (Norwegian: Skallelv kapell) is a chapel in Vadsø Municipality in Finnmark county, Norway. It is located in the village of Skallelv. It is an annex chapel for the Vadsø parish which is part of the Varanger prosti (deanery) in the Diocese of Nord-Hålogaland. The yellow, wooden church was built in a long church style in 1961 by the architect Rolf Harlew Jenssen. The church seats about 78 people. The chapel does not hold regular services other than during the major church holidays and special events.

== See also ==
- List of churches in Nord-Hålogaland
