= Einar Niemi =

Norwegian historian

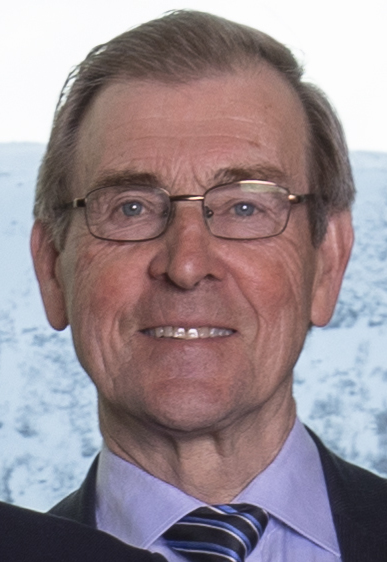
- Niemi in 2019
- Born: 16 September 1943 (age 81); Nord-Varanger, Norway
- Occupation: Historian

Einar Niemi (born 16 September 1943) is a Norwegian historian, born in Nord-Varanger, Finnmark.

== Biography ==
Niemi is known for his study of the history of ethnical minorities, and for his contributions to administration of cultural heritage of Northern Norway. Among his publications is the book Den finske fare from 1981 (co-authored with Knut Einar Eriksen).

On 27 May 2024, Niemi was appointed Knight 1st Class of the Order of St. Olav by King Harald V for his contribution to Sámi and Kven culture. He will be presented the decoration on 5 June at the University of Tromsø.
