= Vadsø Church =

- Vadsø kirke
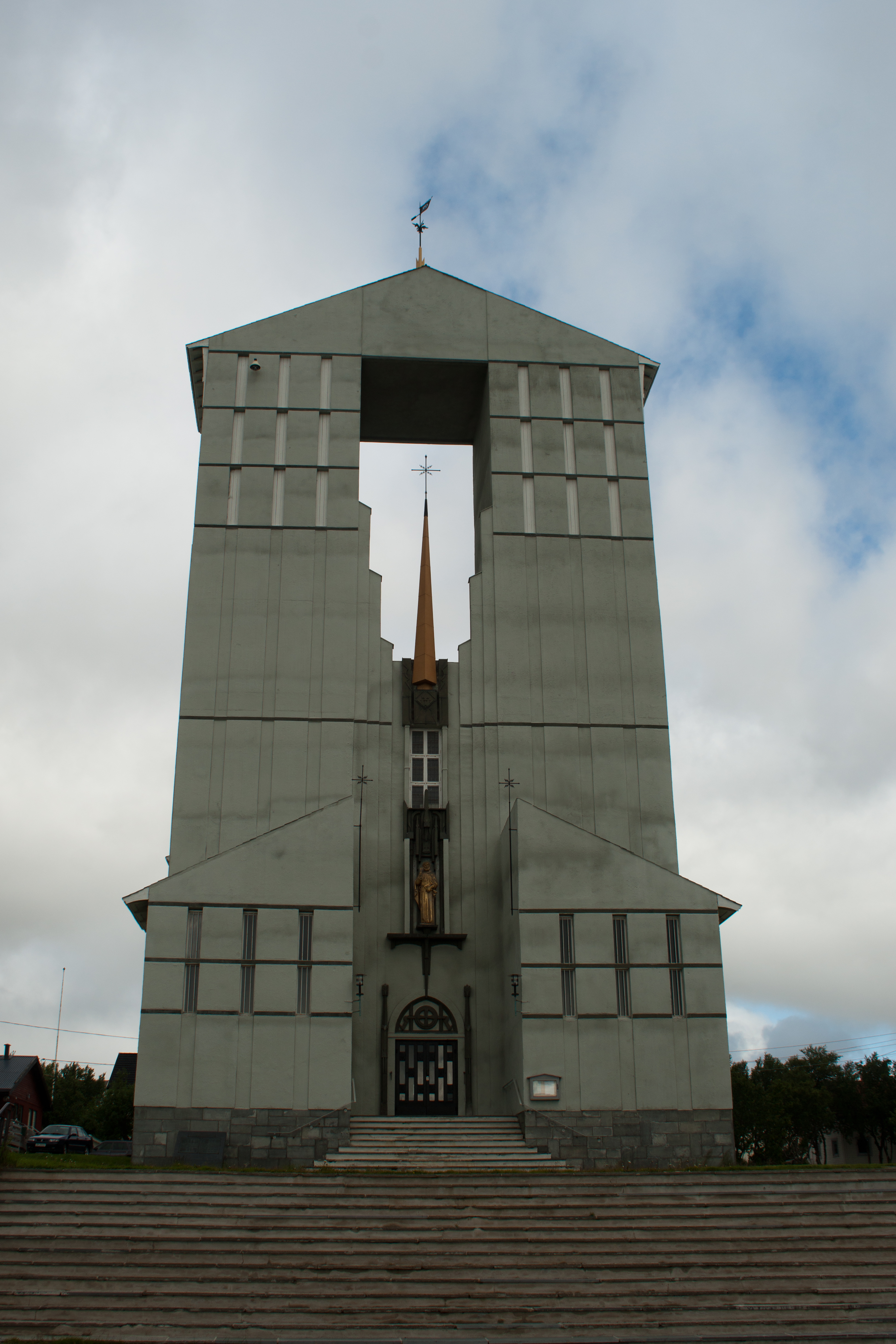
- View of the church
- Vadsø Church
- 70.075888°N 29.750252°E
- Location: Vadsø Municipality, Finnmark
- Country: Norway
- Denomination: Church of Norway
- Churchmanship: Evangelical Lutheran

History
- Status: Parish church
- Founded: 16th century
- Consecrated: 30 March 1958

Architecture
- Functional status: Active
- Architect: Magnus Poulsson
- Architectural type: Long church
- Completed: 1958 (68 years ago)

Specifications
- Capacity: 480
- Materials: Concrete

Administration
- Diocese: Nord-Hålogaland
- Deanery: Varanger prosti
- Parish: Vadsø
- Norwegian Cultural Heritage Site
- Type: Church
- Status: Not protected
- ID: 85739

Vadsø Church (Norwegian: Vadsø kirke) is a parish church of the Church of Norway in Vadsø Municipality in Finnmark county, Norway. It is located in the town of Vadsø. It is the main church for the Vadsø parish which is part of the Varanger prosti (deanery) in the Diocese of Nord-Hålogaland. The gray, concrete church was built in a long church style in 1958 by the architect Magnus Poulsson. The church seats about 480 people.

== History ==
The earliest existing historical records of the church date back to the year 1589, but the church was not new at that time. The first church was located on the island of Vadsøya, where the main Vadsø settlement was located at that time. It was located about 100 metres (330 ft) southeast of the present bridge connecting the island to the mainland. In 1693 the church is referred to as "very old and small for the congregation that exists". The building was a long church with a 7-by-7-metre (23 ft × 23 ft) choir with a steeple above the nave. The nave was about 11 metres (36 ft) long.

In the early 1700s, the small town had expanded beyond its site on the island of Vadsøya to also include land on the mainaland. The old church was in need of replacement, so a new church was built in 1709 at Skattøra on the mainland, about 800–900 metres (2,600–3,000 ft) north of the old church site on the island. The church was located in what is now the western part of the Vadsø cemetery. It was a timber-framed building with a cruciform ground plan and tower. This new building was consecrated in 1711, around the same time that the old medieval church was torn down.

In 1814, this church served as an election church (Norwegian: valgkirke). Together with more than 300 other parish churches across Norway, it was a polling station for elections to the 1814 Norwegian Constituent Assembly which wrote the Constitution of Norway. This was Norway's first national elections. Each church parish was a constituency that elected people called "electors" who later met together in each county to elect the representatives for the assembly that was to meet in Eidsvoll later that year.

In 1858, work on a new cruciform church was begun at Galgebakken, about 200 metres (660 ft) to the northwest of the old church. The church was going to be larger than the old church to support the growing town. This new church was completed and consecrated in 1861. After the new church was put into use, the older church was no longer used and in 1869, most of the old church was torn down. The entry porch was retained, however, and it was turned into a small burial chapel that continued to stand at the cemetery.

During the night of 28–29 October 1944, the retreating German army burned most of the town of Vadsø including the church. The present church was completed in 1958 to replace the previous church.

== Media gallery ==
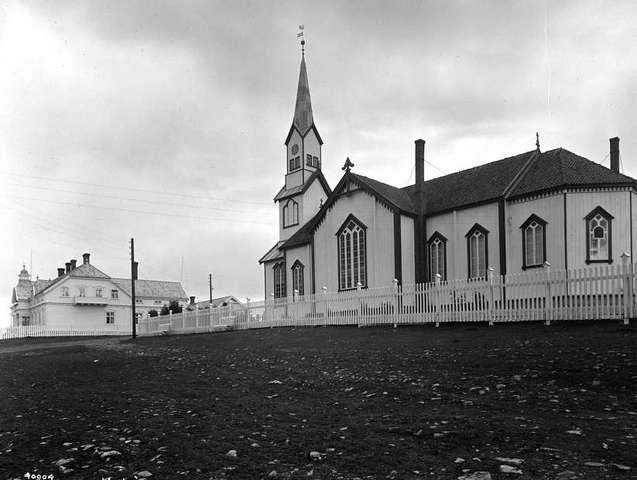
View of the old church (1861–1944)

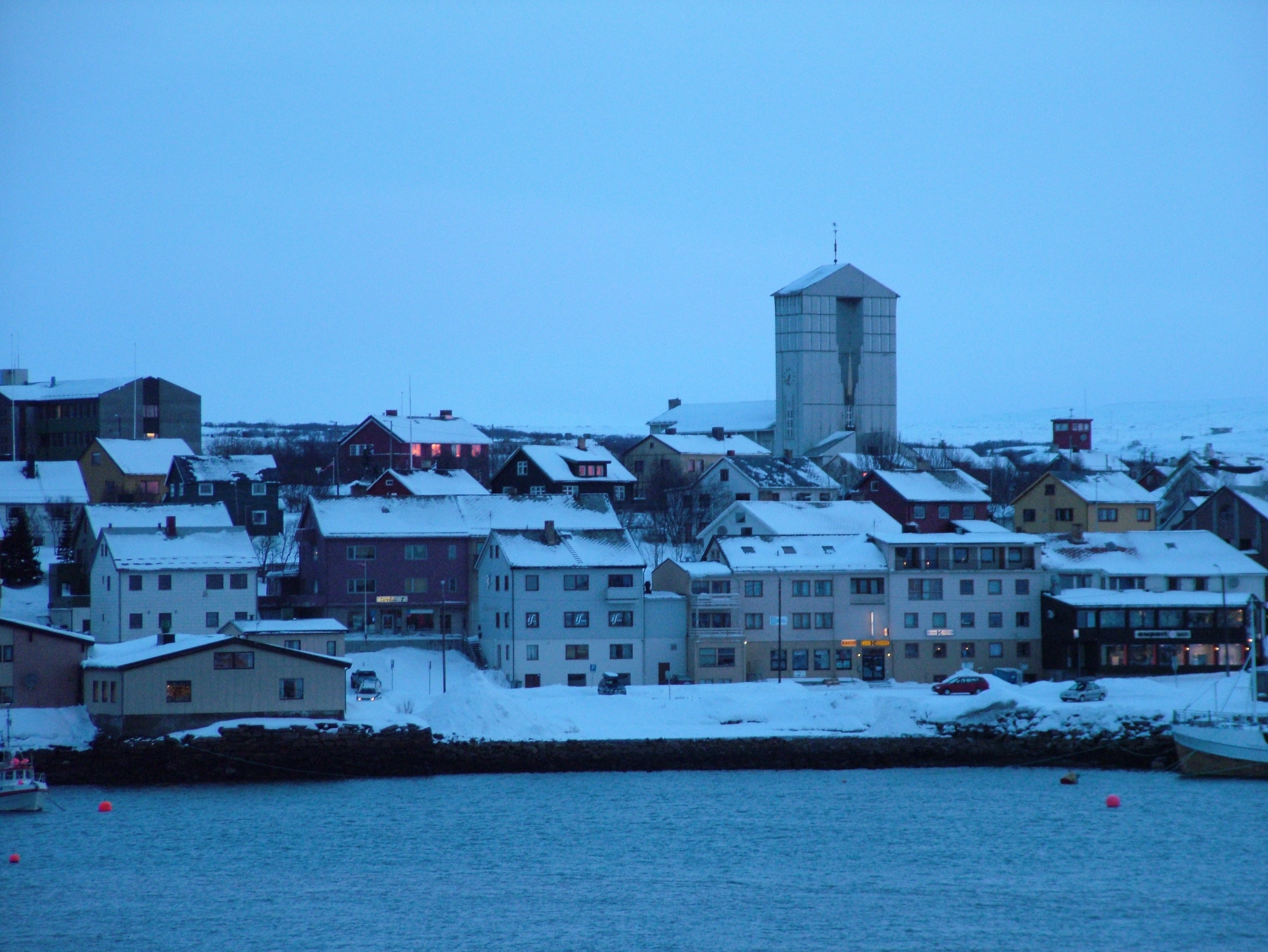
Current church

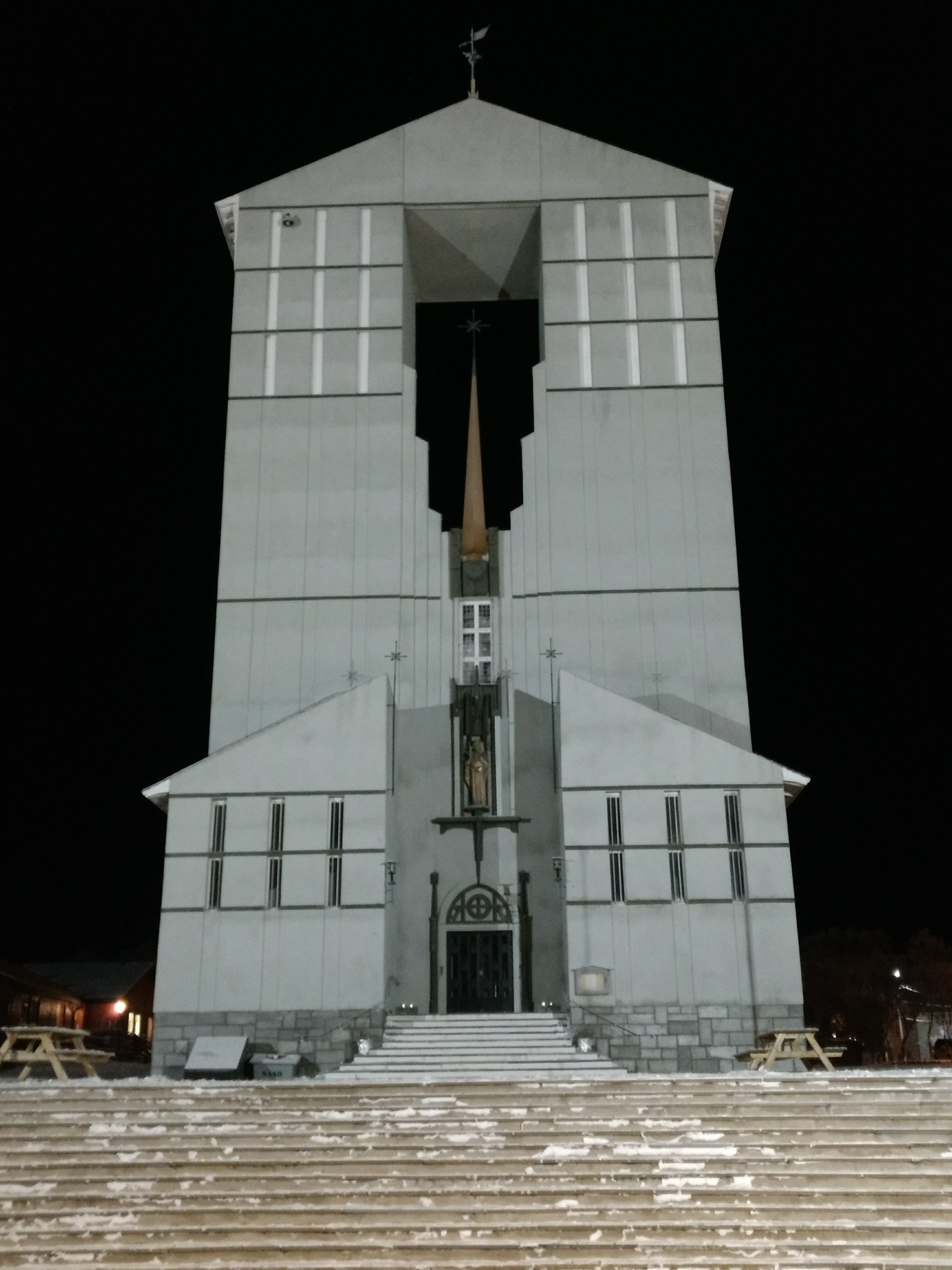
Current church

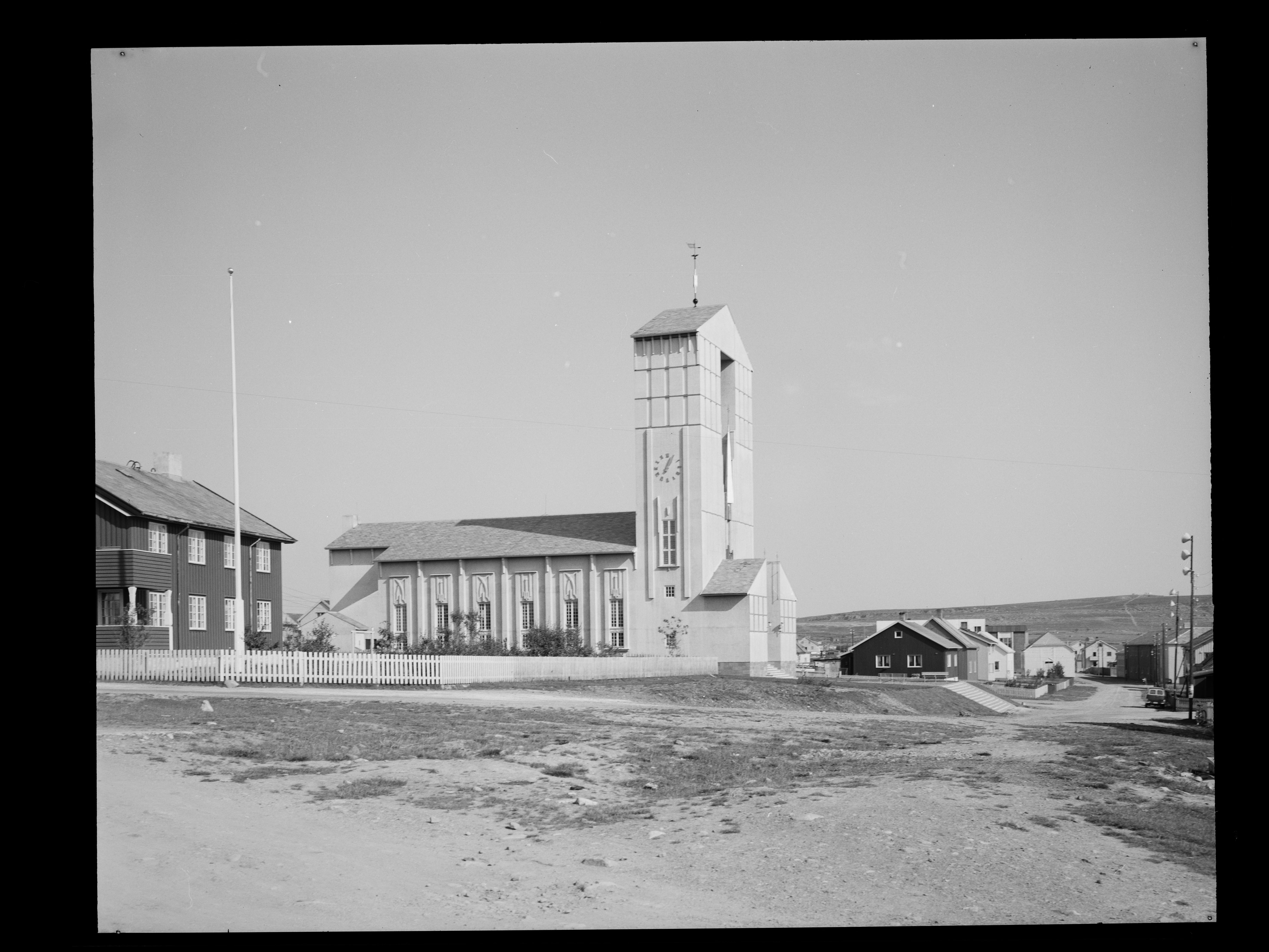

== See also ==
- List of churches in Nord-Hålogaland
