= Jakobselva (Vadsø) =

Jakobselva (Norwegian); Ánnejohka (Northern Sami); Annijoki (Kven)
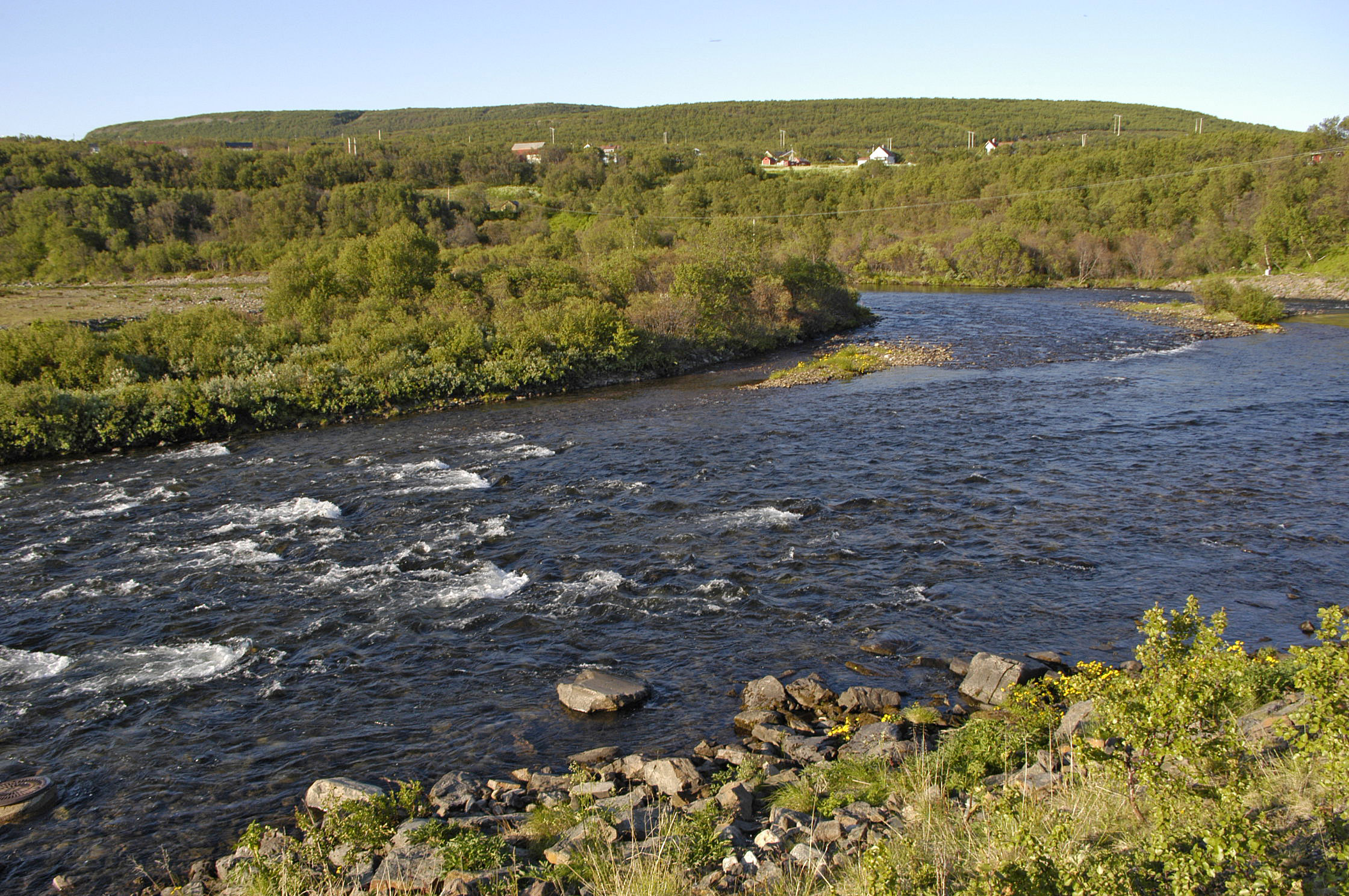
- View of the Jakobselva
- Interactive map of the river
- Etymology: lit. 'Jakob's River'

Location
- Country: Norway
- County: Finnmark
- Municipalities: Vadsø and Nesseby

Physical characteristics
- Source: Midthaugen
  - location: Nesseby Municipality, Finnmark, Norway
  - coordinates: 70°19′55″N 28°49′14″E
  - elevation: 490 m (1,610 ft)
- Mouth: Vestre Jakobselv
  - location: Vadsø Municipality, Finnmark, Norway
  - coordinates: 70°06′41″N 29°20′00″E
  - elevation: 0 m (0 ft)
- Length: 50 km (31 mi)

Jakobselva (Norwegian), Ánnejohka (Northern Sami), or Annijoki (Kven) is a river in Finnmark county, Norway. The river, which is sometimes known as the Vestre Jakobselv (Western Jacob's River), runs through Nesseby Municipality and Vadsø Municipality on the Varanger Peninsula. The river begins around the mountain Midthaugen in Nesseby, near the border with Tana Municipality. It then winds its way down through a lush birch wood valley along the municipal border between Nesseby and Vadsø to the village of Vestre Jakobselv where it completes its 50-kilometre (31 mi) journey and empties into the Varangerfjorden.

The river is known as a superb sport fishing river, with a lot of big salmon.
