= Vadsø (town) =

City/town within Vadsø Municipality, Finnmark, Norway

Vadsø: Vadsø (Norwegian); Čáhcesuolu (Northern Sami); Vesisaari (Kven)
- Town/City
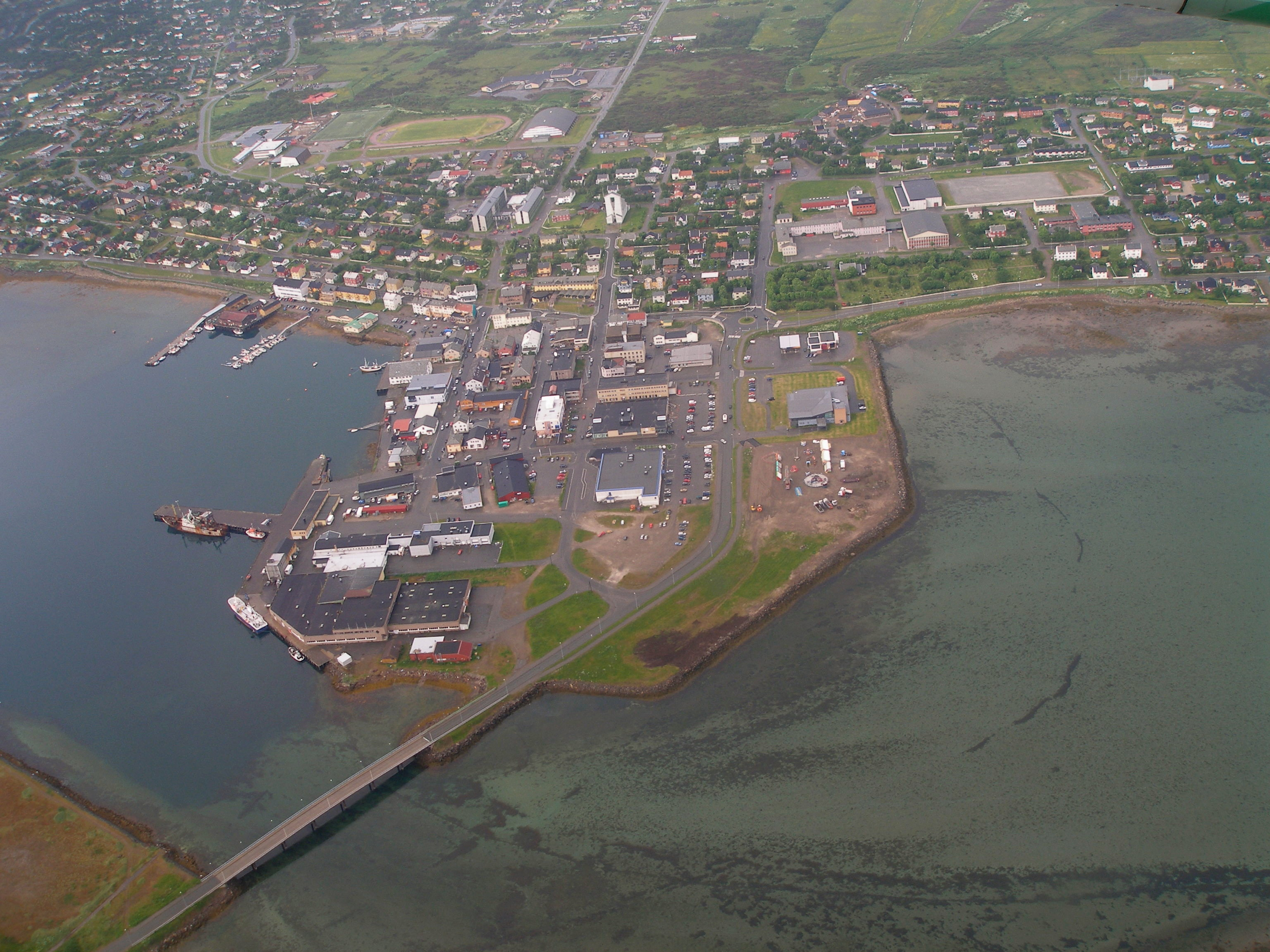
- View of the town
- Interactive map of Vadsø
- Location within Finnmark Location within Norway
- Coordinates: 70.0803°N 29.7315°E
- Country: Norway
- Region: Northern Norway
- County: Finnmark
- District: Øst-Finnmark
- Municipality: Vadsø Municipality
- Established as
- Kjøpstad: 1833

Area
  - Total: 3.43 km^{2} (1.32 sq mi)
- Elevation: 6 m (20 ft)

Population (2023)
  - Total: 4,654
  - Density: 1,357/km^{2} (3,510/sq mi)
- Demonym: Vadsøværing
- Time zone: UTC+01:00 (CET)
  - Summer (DST): UTC+02:00 (CEST)
- Post Code: 9800 Vadsø

Vadsø (Norwegian; pronounced [vɑdˈsø]), Čáhcesuolu (Northern Sami; pronounced [ˈt͡ʃaːht͡seˌsuo̯luː]), or Vesisaari (Kven) is a town in Vadsø Municipality in Finnmark county, Norway. The town is the administrative center of both Vadsø Municipality and Finnmark county, and is the second-largest town in East Finnmark. The town is located on the southern shore of the Varanger Peninsula, along the Varanger Fjord. Part of the town lies on the island of Vadsøya. It is connected to the rest of the town on the mainland by a bridge.

The 3.43-square-kilometre (850-acre) town has a population (2023) of 4,654 which gives the town a population density of 1,357 inhabitants per square kilometre (3,510/sq mi). Vadsø Church is located in the town, and it is the seat of the dean of the Varanger prosti (deanery) which is part of the Diocese of Nord-Hålogaland. The "midnight sun" is above the horizon from 17 May to 28 July, and the period with continuous daylight lasts a bit longer. The period of polar night lasts from 26 November to 17 January.

== History ==
In the 16th century, the settlement consisted of a fishing village and the old Vadsø Church, located on the island of Vadsøya. The settlement later moved to the mainland. Township privilege was granted in 1833, and soon settlers came from Finland and the northern part of Sweden, which suffered from famine. Finnish was rapidly becoming the language of the majority, and this continued for decades. Even today Finnish is still spoken in some households. Vadsø was the headquarters of the first newspaper in a Sámi language, Muitalægje, from April 1873 to September 1875.

During the occupation of Norway by Nazi Germany, Vadsø suffered several air raids from the Soviet Union, which bombed Nazi troops. However, there are, unlike most places in Finnmark, a number of 19th century wooden houses preserved close to the city center, notably the house of Esbensen, built by a Norwegian, and the house of Tuomainen, built by a Finn. On the island of Vadsøya is the airship mast used by Umberto Nobile and Roald Amundsen for their expedition over the North Pole with the airship Norge in 1926, and used again on Nobile's flight with the airship Italia in 1928.

=== Municipal history ===
The village of Vadsø was granted kjøpstad ("town") status in 1833. In 1838, the town of Vadsø and the entire rural district surrounding the Varangerfjorden were established as the new Vadsø Municipality (see formannskapsdistrikt). In 1839, the western district was separated to become the new Nesseby Municipality. Then in 1858, Nesseby Municipality was merged back into Vadsø Municipality, and on the same date, the southern district of Vadsø (south of the Varangerfjorden) was separated to form the new Sør-Varanger Municipality. A few years later in 1864, the western district was separated into a separate municipality once again, re-creating Nesseby Municipality. In 1894, the rest of the rural district surrounding the town of Vadsø was separated to form the new Nord-Varanger Municipality. This meant that the town of Vadsø was all that was left of Vadsø Municipality. This remained the case until 1 January 1964, when Nord-Varanger Municipality was merged back together with the town of Vadsø to form the present-day Vadsø Municipality.

=== Name ===
The name of the town comes from the island Vadsøya, since that was the original townsite. The Old Norse form of the name was Vatnsøy. The first element is the genitive case of vatn which means "water" and the last element is øy which means "island". Therefore, the meaning of the name is "the island with drinking water". The Kven language name simply means "water island".

== Transportation ==
The European route E75 highway goes through the town. The Hurtigruten coastal express ships regularly stop at the pier on Vadsøya island in the town. Vadsø Airport is located just east of the town in the village of Kiby.

== Media ==
The newspaper Varangeren was published in Vadsø from 2007 to 2012.

== See also ==
- List of towns and cities in Norway
