= Varangerfjord =

Fjord in Finnmark county, Norway

Varangerfjorden
- Várjavuonna (Northern Sami); Варангер-фьорд (Russian); Varanginvuono (Finnish)
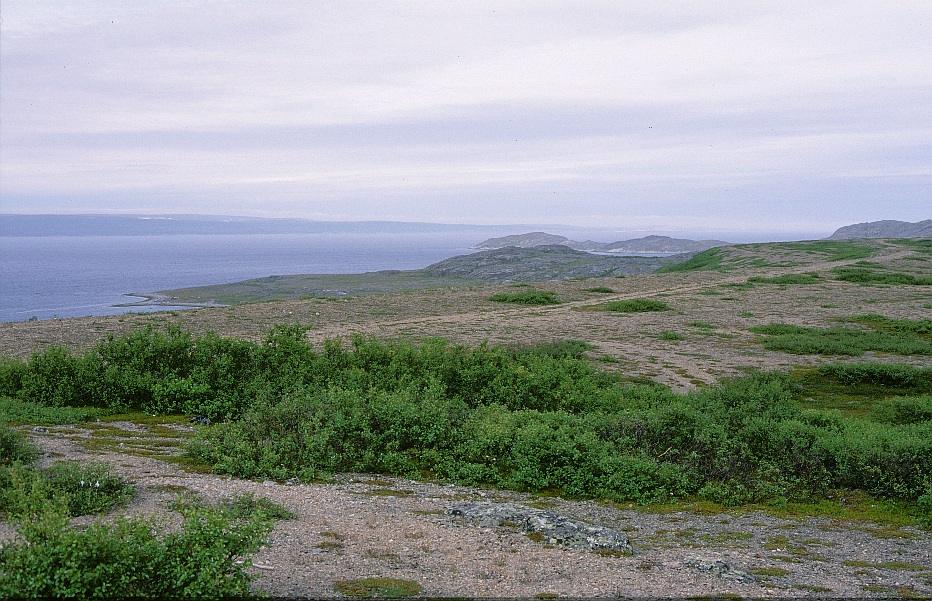
- View of the fjord
- Interactive map of the fjord
- Location: Finnmark county, Norway
- Coordinates: 70.0911°N 31.0091°E
- Type: Fjord
- Primary outflows: Barents Sea
- Ocean/sea sources: Barents Sea
- Basin countries: Norway
- Max. length: 100 kilometres (62 mi)
- Max. width: 70 kilometres (43 mi)
- Settlements: Vardø, Vadsø

The Varangerfjord (English: Varanger Fjord; Russian: Варангер-фьорд, Варяжский залив; Finnish: Varanginvuono; Northern Sami: Várjavuonna) is the easternmost fjord in Norway, north of Finland. The fjord is located in Finnmark county between the Varanger Peninsula and the mainland of Norway.

Economy: There are six fish farming facilities (as of 2025). They use 12,000 tons of feed.

Environmental concerns: Fish farming facilities have been the cause of tons of Copper being deposited in the fjord; in 2026, an association of owners of fishing boats (Øst-Finnmark Kystfiskarlag) petitioned the government to do fact-finding to determine if 430 tons of copper (during the previous 20 years), had been dislodged from fish farming facilities.

== Extents ==
The fjord flows through the municipalities of Vardø, Vadsø, Nesseby, and Sør-Varanger. The fjord is approximately 100 kilometres (62 mi) long, emptying into the Barents Sea. In a strict sense, it is a false fjord, since it does not have the hallmarks of a fjord carved by glaciers.

Its mouth is about 70 kilometres (43 mi) wide, located between the town of Vardø in the northwest and the village of Grense Jakobselv in the southeast. The fjord stretches westwards inland past the town of Vadsø to the village of Varangerbotn in Nesseby Municipality.

Older Russian Imperial and Soviet sources also included its natural extension up to the Russian Rybachy Peninsula on the southern shore and the easternmost part of the Varanger Peninsula on the northern shore.

== History ==
During the first half of the 19th century, the possibility of Russian Empire demanding the cession of a stretch of coast along the Varangerfjord was for some time on the European diplomatic agenda, inducing King Oscar I of Sweden and Norway to conclude an alliance (1855) with Britain and France in order to forestall this possibility.

== Important Bird Area ==
A 55,450 ha area comprising the northern coast of the fjord and the nearby islands of Hornøya and Reinøya, including intertidal and neritic habitats as well as coastal wetlands and tundra grassland, has been designated an Important Bird Area (IBA) by BirdLife International because it supports large numbers of waterbirds, seabirds and waders, either breeding or overwintering. These include lesser white-fronted geese, long-tailed ducks, king eiders, common eiders, Steller's eiders, velvet scoters, red-breasted mergansers, yellow-billed loons, purple sandpipers, black-legged kittiwakes, glaucous gulls, Arctic herring gulls, Atlantic puffins and common murres.
