= Jakob Norz =

German World War II fighter pilot

- Born: 27 September 1920; Saulgrub, Bavaria, Weimar Republic
- Died: 16 September 1944 (aged 23) near Kirkenes, German-occupied Norway
- Burial place: German war cemetery at Pechenga
- Military career
- Allegiance: Nazi Germany
- Branch: Luftwaffe
- Service years: 1939–1944
- Rank: Leutnant (second lieutenant)
- Unit: JG 5
- Conflicts: World War II
- Awards: Knight's Cross of the Iron Cross

Jakob Norz (20 October 1920 – 16 September 1944) was a Luftwaffe flying ace of World War II. Norz is listed with 117 aerial victories—that is, 117 aerial combat encounters resulting in the destruction of the enemy aircraft—becoming an "ace-in-a-day" on seven separate occasions. All his victories were claimed over the Soviet Air Forces in 332 combat missions. He was also a recipient of the Knight's Cross of the Iron Cross, the highest award in the military and paramilitary forces of Nazi Germany during World War II. Norz was killed on 16 September 1944 in a forced landing following combat with a large formation of Soviet aircraft attacking Kirkenes.

== Career ==
Norz was born on 20 October 1920 in Saulgrub in Free State of Bavaria within the Weimar Republic. Holding the rank of Unteroffizier (non-commissioned officer) he served with the I. Gruppe (1st group) of Nachtjagdgeschwader 2 (NJG 2—2nd Night Fighter Wing) since late 1941. (Note: For an explanation of Luftwaffe unit designations see Organisation of the Luftwaffe during World War II.) With this unit he flew night fighter missions against England and convoy escort missions over the Mediterranean Sea. He was briefly transferred as a day time fighter pilot to Jagdgeschwader 51 (JG 51—51st Fighter Wing) operating on the Eastern Front in early 1942. Shortly afterwards, he was posted to the 11. Staffel (11th squadron) of Jagdgeschwader 1 (JG 1—1st Fighter Wing) which was located in Norway. On 21 March, the squadron was re-designated 8. Staffel of Jagdgeschwader 5 (JG 5—5th Fighter Wing). On 20 April, 8. Staffel moved to an airfield at Petsamo, present-day Pechenga in Murmansk Oblast, Russia on the Eismeerfront (Ice Sea Front)—the area of operations nearest the Arctic Ocean.

=== War on the Arctic Front ===
Operating in this northern theatre of operations, Norz claimed his first five aerial victories by the end of 1942. He was presented with the Iron Cross 1st Class (Eisernes Kreuz erster Klasse) by Generaloberst Hans-Jürgen Stumpff on account of his II. and III. Gruppe visit at Pechenga on 19 June.

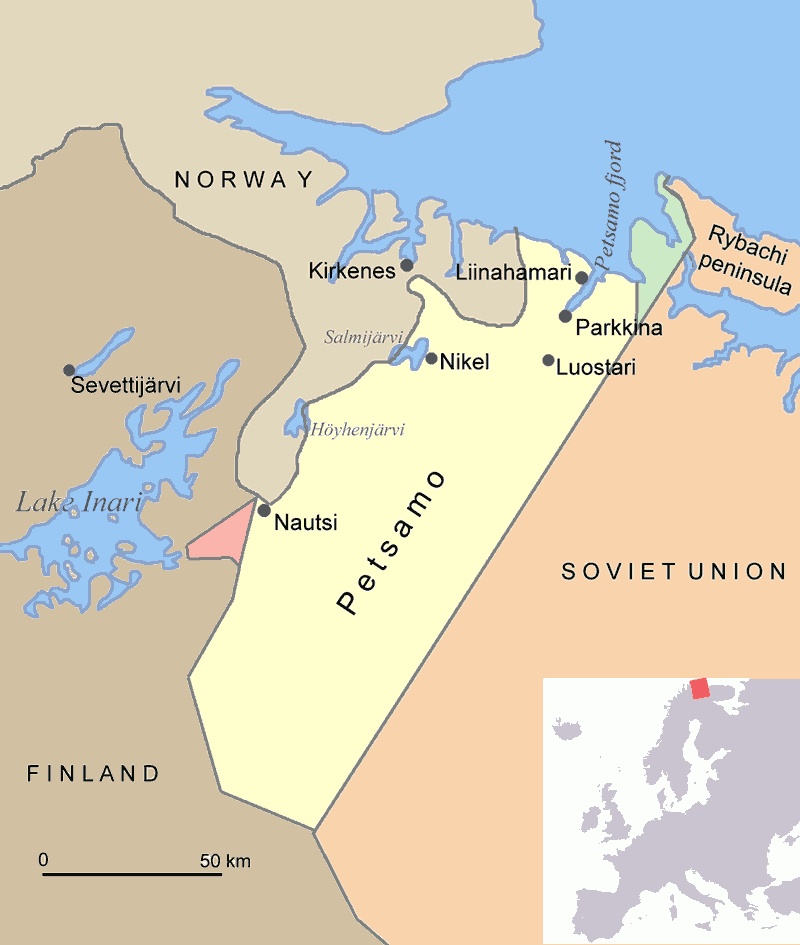
Area of operations.

Following victorious combat with two Ilyushin Il-2 "Shturmovik" southwest Eyna Guba on 5 March 1943 he made a forced landing of his Messerschmitt Bf 109 F-4 (Werknummer 13108—factory number) on a frozen lake in no man's land. He returned to a German held position after an eight-hour walk in high snow. Norz claimed his 17th and 18th aerial victory on 4 June 1943.

JG 5 flew multiple missions from Pechenga and Kirkenes in protection of a German convoy on 14 September. At 17:03, a Rotte of Bf 109 G-2s sighted and reported an enemy formation consisting of Douglas A-20 Havoc, also known as Boston bombers, Ilyushin Il-2 ground attack aircraft, as well as Bell P-39 Airacobra and Hawker Hurricane fighters. At 18:15, 9. Staffel was scrambled at Pechenga and 5. Staffel at Svartnes. A bit later further Bf 109s from 4., 7. and 5. Staffel took off. The Germans intercepted the Soviet formation east of Ekkerøy over the Varangerfjord. In this aerial engagement, Norz claimed the destruction of Hurricane fighter.

On 25 November, following ten days of relative quiet, the Soviet Air Forces conducted a coordinated attack on Titovka, and the airfields Høybuktmoen at Kirkenes and Luostari near Pechenga. Titovka is attacked by sixteen Il-2s and six Curtiss P-40 Warhawk, escorted by six Yakovlev Yak-1 and four Yakovlev Yak-9. Høybuktmoen was hit by twelve Petlyakov Pe-2 escorted by twelve Bell P-39 Airacobra and six Yak-9. The Luostari airfield was struck by sixteen Il-2 and six P-40, protected by fourteen Yak-1 and six Hurricanes. That day, Norz claimed two Il-2 ground attack aircraft, taking his total to 45 aerial victories.

On 17 March 1944, Norz became an "ace-in-a-day" for the first time, claiming five Soviet fighters shot down. He was awarded the Knight's Cross of the Iron Cross (Ritterkreuz des Eisernen Kreuzes) on 26 March 1944 following his 74th aerial victory. During aerial combat on 4 July, he claimed five Yakovlev Yak-9 fighters shot down, taking his total to 91. On 17 July, he became the 82nd Luftwaffe pilot to achieve the century mark. As part of the group expansion from three Staffeln per Gruppe to four Staffeln per Gruppe, Norz's 8. Staffel was re-designated and became the 11. Staffel of JG 5 on 15 August. Norz claimed four Petlyakov Pe-2 bombers and a Bell P-39 Airacobra destroyed on 23 August, taking his total to 116 aerial victories.

Walter Schuck, a wartime friend of Jakob Norz, witnessed Norz's final flight on 16 September 1944. According to Schuck, Norz attacked and shot down a Douglas Boston but was hit in the engine by the defensive fire from the Boston. (Note: According to Obermaier following combat with an Ilyushin Il-2 "Shturmovik".) Norz reported that his cabin was filling with smoke. Schuck urged Norz to bale out but Norz decided to fly back to base to avoid capture by the Russians. Schuck broke off further combat and escorted Norz back to base. Norz, intoxicated by the smoke, reported that his elevator seized and that he could not trim the aircraft. Already too low for bailing out, Norz attempted a crash landing in the tundra. The Bf 109 G-6 "yellow 8" (Werknummer 412 199—factory number) struck a rock and disintegrated, killing Norz. He was buried with military honors at the German war cemetery at Pechenga.

== Summary of career ==
=== Aerial victory claims ===
According to US historian David T. Zabecki, Norz was credited with 117 aerial victories. Obermaier and Spick also list Norz with 117 aerial victories claimed in 332 combat missions, all of which claimed on the Eastern Front. Mathews and Foreman, authors of Luftwaffe Aces — Biographies and Victory Claims, researched the German Federal Archives and found records for 104 aerial victory claims, all of which claimed on the Eastern Front.

Victory claims were logged to a map-reference (PQ = Planquadrat), for example "PQ 36 Ost 3079". The Luftwaffe grid map (Jägermeldenetz) covered all of Europe, western Russia and North Africa and was composed of rectangles measuring 15 minutes of latitude by 30 minutes of longitude, an area of about 360 square miles (930 km^{2}). These sectors were then subdivided into 36 smaller units to give a location area 3 km × 4 km (1.9 mi × 2.5 mi) in size.

Chronicle of aerial victories
This and the ♠ (Ace of spades) indicates those aerial victories which made Norz an "ace-in-a-day", a term which designates a fighter pilot who has shot down five or more airplanes in a single day. This and the – (dash) indicates unconfirmed aerial victory claims for which Norz did not receive credit. This and the ? (question mark) indicates information discrepancies listed by Prien, Stemmer, Rodeike, Balke, Bock, Mombeek, Mathews, and Foreman.
Claim	Date	Time	Type	Location	Claim	Date	Time	Type	Location
– 8. Staffel of Jagdgeschwader 5 – Eastern Front and northern Norway, and Finland — 10 January – 31 December 1942
1	15 May 1942	18:30	Hurricane	south of Ura-Guba	4	5 September 1942	08:38	Hurricane	PQ 36 Ost 3079
2	10 August 1942	18:48	Hurricane	PQ 37 Ost 20854	5? (Note: This claim is neither listed by Mombeek nor by Mathews and Foreman.)	29 October 1942	—	unknown	
3	2 September 1942	11:18	I-61 (MiG-3)	PQ 36 Ost 3912 vicinity of the Kola railroad					
– 8. Staffel of Jagdgeschwader 5 – Eastern Front and northern Norway, and Finland — 1 January – 31 December 1943
6?	24 January 1943	—	LaGG-3		26	4 July 1943	22:02	Pe-2	PQ 37 Ost 11739
7?	5 February 1943	—	LaGG-3		27	4 July 1943	22:05	Boston	PQ 37 Ost 1179
? (Note: This claim is not listed by Prien, Stemmer, Rodeike and Bock.)	28 February 1943	16:03	P-40		28	12 July 1943	01:00	P-39	PQ 37 Ost 11346
?	28 February 1943	16:06	Pe-2		29	16 July 1943	00:55	P-39	PQ 37 Ost 10668
8	1 March 1943	07:17? (Note: According to Mombeek, Mathews and Foreman claimed at 07:07.)	Il-2	PQ 37 Ost 1067 vicinity of Pechenga	30	16 July 1943	01:05	P-39	PQ 37 Ost 10283
9	5 March 1943	08:12	P-40	PQ 37 Ost 1069	31	20 August 1943	11:30	Hurricane	PQ 27 Ost RH 96, vicinity of Alta
10	5 March 1943	12:05	Il-2	PQ 37 Ost 1066	32	23 August 1943	04:56	Hampden	PQ 37 Ost SE 66
11	27 March 1943	14:30? (Note: According to Mombeek, Mathews and Foreman claimed at 14:27.)	P-39	PQ 37 Ost 3079	33	23 August 1943	04:58	Pe-2	PQ 37 Ost SE 63
12	30 March 1943	10:45	P-40	PQ 36 Ost 3911	34	6 September 1943	19:04	Boston	PQ 37 Ost OB 7
13	22 May 1943	19:45	Hurricane	PQ 37 Ost 2033	35	6 September 1943	19:05	Boston	PQ 37 Ost OB 8
14	22 May 1943	21:40	Hurricane	PQ 37 Ost 2019	36	6 September 1943	19:07	Boston	PQ 37 Ost OC 6
15	1 June 1943	03:46	P-39	PQ 37 Ost 2036	37	14 September 1943	18:45	Hurricane	PQ 37 Ost RC 4
16	1 June 1943	03:49	P-39	PQ 37 Ost 2049	38	20 September 1943	16:05	Pe-2	PQ 37 Ost UH 71
17	5 June 1943	04:02	Hurricane	PQ 37 Ost 2044	39	23 September 1943	12:50	P-40	PQ 37 Ost UG
18	5 June 1943	05:48	Hurricane	PQ 37 Ost 3051	40	23 September 1943	12:53	P-40	PQ 37 Ost AG
19	19 June 1943	16:27	Hurricane	PQ 37 Ost 20421	41	23 September 1943	12:55	P-40	PQ 37 Ost AG
20	27 June 1943	12:02	Hurricane	PQ 37 Ost 10299; 2 km (1.2 mi) east of Pummanki	42	24 September 1943	08:50	P-40	PQ 37 Ost UG
21	27 June 1943	12:04	Hurricane	PQ 37 Ost 20177; 6 km (3.7 mi) northeast of Pummanki	43?	24 September 1943	08:55	P-39	PQ 37 Ost UG
22	29 June 1943	14:12	Pe-2	PQ 37 Ost 11623; 29 km (18 mi) northeast of Vardø	44	24 September 1943	09:00	P-40	PQ 36 Ost AG
23	29 June 1943	14:13	Pe-2	PQ 37 Ost 11489; 30 km (19 mi) northeast of Vardø	45?	24 September 1943	09:20	Hurricane	PQ 36 Ost AG
24	29 June 1943	14:16	P-40	PQ 37 Ost 11495; 35 km (22 mi) northeast of Vardø	46?	9 October 1943	—	Yak-7	Murmansk
25	4 July 1943	22:01	Pe-2	PQ 37 Ost 11812					
According to Prien, Stemmer, Rodeike and Bock, Norz claimed seven undocumented aerial victories in October to November 1943. These seven claims are neither listed by Mombeek nor by Mathews and Foreman.
54	6 November 1943	12:17	Pe-2	PQ 37 Ost RF 74, 3 km (1.9 mi) northwest of Subowka	56	25 November 1943	11:55	Il-2	PQ 37 Ost UE 83, 40 km (25 mi) east of Pechenga airfield 40 km (25 mi) northwest of Pechenga airfield
55	25 November 1943	11:52	Il-2	PQ 37 Ost TC 43, 5 km (3.1 mi) east of Pechenga airfield 5 km (3.1 mi) northwest of Pechenga airfield					
– 8. Staffel of Jagdgeschwader 5 – Eastern Front and northern Norway, and Finland — 1 January – July 1944
57	21 February 1944	14:21	P-39	west of Murmashi west of Murmansk	82♠	28 June 1944	00:05	P-39	northeast of Kirkenes
58	21 February 1944	14:24	P-39	west of Murmashi vicinity of Murmansk	83♠	28 June 1944	00:13	P-39	north of Kirkenes
59?	24 February 1944	09:40	P-39	Lake Tug	84♠	28 June 1944	00:20	P-39	northeast of Kirkenes
60	29 February 1944	13:30	Yak-7	northwest of Murmansk southwest of Murmansk	85♠	28 June 1944	03:50	Yak-9	PQ 37 Ost SC-2/3
61	29 February 1944	13:36	Yak-7	northwest of Murmansk	86♠	28 June 1944	03:58	Yak-9	PQ 37 Ost RC-8/3
— (Note: This claim is not listed by Mathews and Foreman.)	5 March 1944	13:35	Il-2	southwest of Murmansk	87♠	4 July 1944	18:59	Yak-9	PQ 37 Ost RA-4/6
62	5 March 1944	13:36	Il-2	north of Ekkerøy	88♠	4 July 1944	19:09	Yak-9	PQ 37 Ost RB-7/1, north of Taarnet
63	13 March 1944	13:37	Yak-7	southeast of Vayda-Guba	89♠	4 July 1944	19:15	Yak-9	PQ 37 Ost SA-5/5
64?	13 March 1944	13:39	Yak-7	west of Rybachy Peninsula	90♠	4 July 1944	19:26	Yak-9	PQ 37 Ost SB-1/9
65	13 March 1944	13:41	Yak-9	southeast of Pummanki	91♠	4 July 1944	19:30	Yak-9	PQ 37 Ost SB-1/2, east-northeast of Kirkenes
66♠	17 March 1944	11:10	Il-2	north of Hamningberg	92	9 July 1944	20:50	P-40	PQ 37 Ost QC-1/2
67♠	17 March 1944	11:11	P-39	northeast of Hamningberg	93	9 July 1944	20:51	P-40	PQ 37 Ost QC-1/4
68♠	17 March 1944	11:13	P-39	southeast of Hamningberg northeast of Hamningberg	94	9 July 1944	20:53	P-40	PQ 37 Ost QC-5/1
69♠	17 March 1944	15:39	P-39	northeast of Pechenga	95	9 July 1944	20:57	P-40	PQ 37 Ost QD-4/7
70♠	17 March 1944	15:40	P-39	northeast of Pechenga north of Pechenga	96♠	17 July 1944	18:30	P-39	PQ 37 Ost SB-5/2
71	2 April 1944	04:49	Yak-7	PQ 37 Ost RD-9/6	97♠	17 July 1944	18:33	P-39	PQ 37 Ost SB-1/5
72	2 April 1944	04:51	Yak-7	PQ 37 Ost RD-9/6	98♠	17 July 1944	19:01	Boston	PQ 37 Ost SB-1/9
73	2 April 1944	04:53	Yak-9	PQ 37 Ost RD-8/3	99♠	17 July 1944	19:03	Boston	PQ 37 Ost SB-3/1
74	7 April 1944	10:31	Yak-9	PQ 37 Ost SG-8/7	100♠	17 July 1944	19:12	Boston	vicinity of Kirkenes
75♠	27 June 1944	16:46	Boston	north of Kirkenes	101	21 July 1944	05:25	P-40	southeast of Cape Markur
76♠	27 June 1944	16:46	Boston	north of Kirkenes	102	22 July 1944	12:35	P-40	PQ 37 Ost RE-8/6
77♠	27 June 1944	16:47	Boston	north-northeast of Kirkenes	103	22 July 1944	12:41	P-40	PQ 37 Ost RE-9/8
78♠	27 June 1944	17:02	Yak-9	southeast of Kirkenes	104	22 July 1944	12:42	P-40	PQ 37 Ost RE-3/7
79♠	27 June 1944	17:10	Yak-9	northwest of Kirkenes	105	28 July 1944	12:56	P-39	PQ 37 Ost UC-3/1
80♠	28 June 1944	00:01	P-39	northeast of Kirkenes	106	28 July 1944	12:59	P-39	PQ 37 Ost UC-3/9
81♠	28 June 1944	00:03	P-39	west of Kirkenes					
– 11. Staffel of Jagdgeschwader 5 – Eastern Front — 15 August – 16 September 1944
107♠	17 August 1944	09:48	P-39	PQ 37 Ost TB-7	113♠	23 August 1944	12:39	Pe-2	PQ 37 Ost RD, north of Pechenga
108♠	17 August 1944	09:54	Boston	PQ 37 Ost SA-1	114♠	23 August 1944	12:40	Pe-2	PQ 37 Ost SD, northwest of Pechenga
109♠	17 August 1944	09:55	Boston	PQ 37 Ost RU-9	115♠	23 August 1944	12:40	Pe-2	PQ 37 Ost SD, northwest of Pechenga
110♠	17 August 1944	09:56	Boston	PQ 37 Ost RU-9	116♠	23 August 1944	16:38	P-39	PQ 37 Ost TC
111♠	17 August 1944	09:58	Boston	PQ 37 Ost RU-3	117	16 September 1944	11:56	Boston	PQ 37 Ost SA-2/8 vicinity of Kirkenes
112♠	23 August 1944	12:10	Pe-2	PQ 37 Ost RD, north of Pechenga					

=== Awards ===
- Iron Cross (1939) 2nd and 1st Class
- Honor Goblet of the Luftwaffe on 13 September 1943 as Feldwebel and pilot
- German Cross in Gold on 17 October 1943 as Feldwebel in the 8./Jagdgeschwader 5
- Knight's Cross of the Iron Cross on 26 March 1944 as Oberfeldwebel and pilot in the 6./Jagdgeschwader 5 (Note: According to Scherzer as pilot in the III./Jagdgeschwader 5.)
