= Walter Schuck =

German WWII flying ace (1920–2015)

- Schuck in 2013
- Born: 30 July 1920; Frankenholz, Saarland
- Died: 27 March 2015 (aged 94); Neunkirchen, Germany
- Military career
- Allegiance: Nazi Germany
- Branch: Luftwaffe
- Service years: 1937–1945
- Rank: Oberleutnant (first lieutenant)
- Nickname: Sohndel
- Units: JG 3; JG 5; JG 7
- Commands: 10./JG 5; 3./JG 7
- Conflicts: World War II; Eastern Front; Arctic convoys; Defence of the Reich
- Awards: Knight's Cross of the Iron Cross with Oak Leaves
- Other work: Flight instructor, Syrian Air Force

Walter Schuck (30 July 1920 – 27 March 2015) was a German military aviator who served in the Luftwaffe from 1937 until the end of World War II. As a fighter ace, he claimed 206 enemy aircraft shot down in over 500 combat missions, eight of which while flying the Messerschmitt Me 262 jet fighter. (Note: For a list of Luftwaffe Jet aces see List of German World War II jet aces) Schuck was a recipient of the Knight's Cross of the Iron Cross with Oak Leaves.

Born in the Saargebiet (Territory of the Saar Basin), Schuck volunteered for service in the Luftwaffe of Nazi Germany in 1936 and was accepted in 1937. After a period of training at various pilot and fighter pilot schools, he was posted to Jagdgeschwader 5 (JG 5—5th Fighter Wing), operating on the most northern section of the Eastern Front, the Arctic Front, in April 1942. In April 1944 he was awarded the Knight's Cross of the Iron Cross for 84 aerial victories. Following his 171st aerial victory he was injured in combat and received the Knight's Cross of the Iron Cross with Oak Leaves during his convalescence. In early 1945 Schuck transferred to Jagdgeschwader 7 (JG 7—7th Fighter Wing) which operated the then revolutionary Me 262 jet fighter. Claiming a further eight aerial victories, he was forced to bail out when his aircraft was shot down by Lieutenant (later Colonel) Joe Peterburs flying in his P-51 Mustang on 10 April 1945. Schuck sustained minor injuries, preventing him from flying further combat missions.

== Childhood, education and early career ==
Schuck was born on 30 July 1920 in Frankenholz, now part of Bexbach, in the Saargebiet, at the time a region of Germany occupied and governed by the United Kingdom and France from 1920 to 1935 under a League of Nations mandate. Schuck was one of five children of Jakob Schuck, a coal miner and veteran of World War I, and his wife. After graduation from the Volksschule (primary school), he unsuccessfully applied for an apprenticeship at the coal mine in Falkenhorst. Money was tight in the family and higher education was out of reach. He then jobbed at a local brickyard. After a plebiscite on 13 January 1935, Saar was restored to Germany on 1 March 1935. The introduction of the compulsory military service on 16 March 1935 was seen by Schuck as a career opportunity and a chance to fulfil his dream of flying. His father, who had experienced the trench warfare during World War I, advised him to take every opportunity to avoid service in the infantry. Schuck volunteered for service in the Luftwaffe of the Wehrmacht at the age of 16, before he could be conscripted into the infantry.

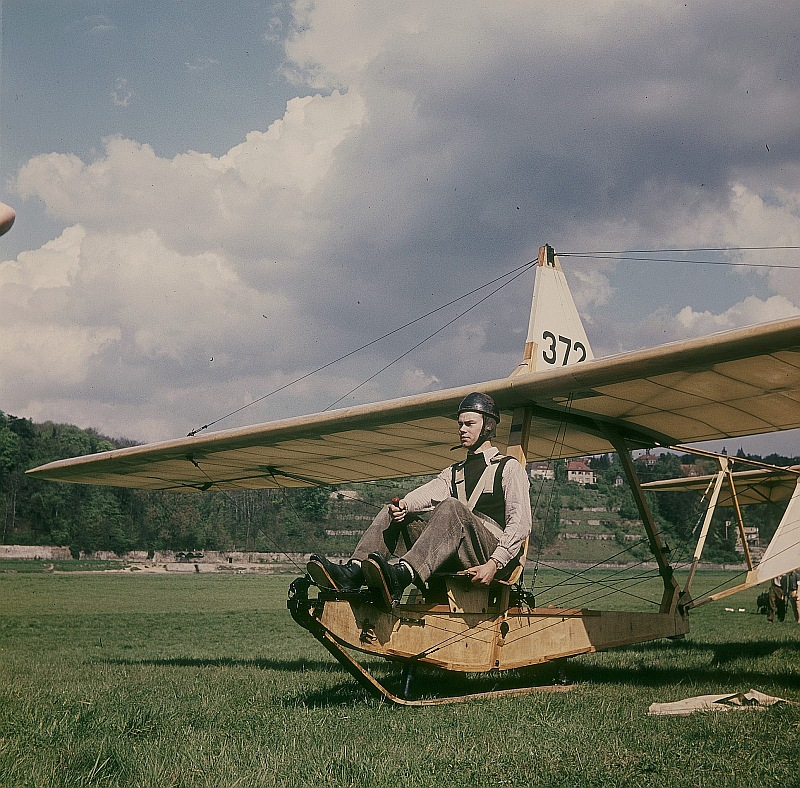
Schuck learned to fly the SG 38 Schulgleiter (school glider) at Schüren.

Schuck received a letter in early 1937 that he had been accepted by the Luftwaffe. Prior to enlisting he had to complete his six months of the Reich Labour Service (Reichsarbeitsdienst), which he began on 3 April 1937. His recruit training began in November 1937 with the 2. Fliegerersatzabteilung 24 (2nd Flier Replacement Unit 24) in Quakenbrück. On 1 April 1938 he was transferred to the Flughafenbetriebskompanie (Airport Operation Company) of Kampfgeschwader 254 (KG 254—254th Bomber Wing) to Gütersloh. Initially Schuck was tasked with security guard duties before he was assigned to help a fellow soldier, a truck driver, haul material around the airbase. Schuck did not possess a driver's license, but he was unofficially taught how to drive the 3-tonne Mercedes truck. This impressed his commanding officer, Hauptmann (Captain) Schneiderberger, who transferred him to the glider pilot school at Schüren, near Meschede in the Sauerland, after the Sudeten Crisis. After a few weeks at Schüren, Schuck returned to Gütersloh in mid-November 1938.

In February 1939, Schuck attended a three-month course at the Luftfahrttechnische Schule (aeronautical technical school) at Bonn-Hangelar. Following this, he was transferred back to Quakenbrück, this time to the A/B Fliegerschule (flight school for the pilot license) of Fliegerausbildungs-Regiment 82 (flight training regiment). Flight training in the Luftwaffe progressed through the levels A1, A2 and B1, B2, referred to as A/B flight training. A training included theoretical and practical training in aerobatics, navigation, long-distance flights and dead-stick landings. The B courses included high-altitude flights, instrument flights, night landings and training to handle the aircraft in difficult situations. Schuck logged his first solo flight after only 18 takeoff and landings. Normally the first solo flight was flown after 30 to 40 accompanied flights. Schuck completed his B2 flight training just prior to the start of the Battle of France on 10 May 1940. He received his A/B pilot license on 14 May 1940.

Schuck initially wanted to become an aerial reconnaissance pilot, flying the Dornier Do 17. However, due to disciplinary problems following unauthorized aerobatics on a Focke-Wulf Fw 56 "Stösser" and an open conflict with his commanding officer, Oberleutnant Brunner, Schuck ran the risk of a potential court-martial. To avoid further escalations Schuck was transferred to the Jagdfliegerschule (fighter pilot school) at Werneuchen. He arrived at Werneuchen on 16 June 1940 where he was assigned to the 3. Staffel (3rd squadron). The entire Gruppe was under the command of Oberleutnant Klaus Quaet-Faslem. Schuck's fighter pilot instructor was Oberfeldwebel Hobe, who was aware of Schuck's disciplinary history. Hobe commented "Schuck, we don't want problems here. We now go on a test flight and I am sure that you will be leaving afterwards". Fearful that this might have end his flying career, Schuck followed Hobe's every maneuver, which impressed Quaet-Faslem who had witnessed their test flight. Schuck's flying career was saved. At Werneuchen the pilots were first trained on the Messerschmitt Bf 109 B-2, later the Bf 109 E-1, which had a more powerful engine. Schuck scored more than 90% hits during target practice, the highest score then achieved at Werneuchen. After his graduation from the fighter pilot school, he was transferred to the 3. Staffel of Ergänzungsjagdgruppe Merseburg (Supplementary Fighter Group) on 2 September 1940.

== World War II ==
Schuck's first operational assignment was with Jagdgeschwader 3 (JG 3—3rd Fighter Wing) in October 1940, when I. Gruppe (1st group) JG 3 was tasked to give top cover to Adolf Hitler en route to Belgium, which was not known at the time. (Note: For an explanation of Luftwaffe unit designations see Organisation of the Luftwaffe during World War II.) There he was assigned to the Ergänzungsjagdgruppe 3 under the command of Oberleutnant (First Lieutenant) Hans-Curt Graf von Sponeck, son of Hans Graf von Sponeck. On 25 October 1940, Schuck's Bf 109 E-3 (Werknummer 946—factory number) veered off the runway at Saint-Omer-Wizernes. In this accident, Schuck was injured and the aircraft destroyed. According to his own account, he suffered a concussion and was hospitalized. After his release, he was promoted to Unteroffizier (non-commissioned officer) on 1 December. Schuck claims that his nickname "Sohndel" (the hypocoristic form of "son" in the German language) was given to him by his friend Franz Dörr. Dörr, who was seven years older than Schuck, became a fatherly figure to him and the nickname stuck.

Ergänzungsjagdgruppe 3 was moved to Esbjerg on 8 September 1941. On 29 December 1941, the unit received the order from the Oberkommando der Luftwaffe (OKL) that it would be detached from JG 3 on 31 December and was renamed to 7. Staffel (7th squadron) of Jagdgeschwader 5 (JG 5—5th Fighter Wing) and subordinated as an autonomous Staffel to Jagdfliegerführer Norwegen. Relocation north began on 2 January 1942, at first to Stavanger-Forus and then to Bodø on 1 February. On 24 April 7. Staffel arrived in Pechenga, also referred to as Petsamo, where it was subordinated to III. Gruppe (3rd group) of JG 5 under the command of Hauptmann Günther Scholz.

=== The Arctic Front ===
Schuck claimed his first victory on 15 May 1942, a Mikoyan-Gurevich MiG-3. On 5 June 1942, he claimed four Soviet fighters shot down. Schuck was awarded the Iron Cross 1st Class (Eisernes Kreuz erster Klasse) on 14 June 1942. The presentation was made by Generaloberst (Colonel General) Hans-Jürgen Stumpff on account of his II. and III. Gruppe visit at Pechenga on 19 June. In July 1942, a new 9. Staffel was created from elements of 7. and 8. Staffel. The former 9. Staffel was renamed to 10. Staffel thus becoming a squadron of IV. Gruppe. Schuck was promoted to Feldwebel (staff sergeant) on 1 December 1942. At 06:03 and 06:05 on 19 March 1943, claimed his 27th and 28th aerial victory over two Curtiss P-40 Kittyhawk fighters flying at an altitude of 6,000 meters (20,000 ft). By April 1943, Schuck had claimed 34 victories against the Soviets. On 24 June 1943, he was awarded the German Cross in Gold (Deutsches Kreuz in Gold).

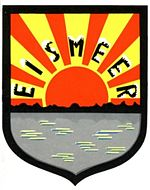
Emblem of JG 5 "Eismeer"

On 3 September 1943, 9. Staffel was scrambled to fend off an inbound attack on Pechenga airfield. Parts of 9. Staffel encountered a flight of five Hawker Hurricane fighters approximately 18 kilometres (11 miles) east of Murmashi. During this encountered, three Hurricanes were claimed shot down, including two by Schuck. At 14:25 on 12 September 1943, Schuck and his wingman Unteroffizier Hermann Amend encountered a flight of P-40s in the vicinity of Murmashi. In this engagement, Schuck claimed two victories. Later that day at 17:02, Schuck claimed another P-40 destroyed, taking his total to 46 aerial victories.

JG 5 flew multiple missions from Pechenga and Kirkenes in protection of a German convoy on 14 September. At 17:03, a Rotte of Bf 109 G-2s sighted and reported an enemy formation consisting of Douglas A-20 Havoc, also known as "Boston" bombers, Ilyushin Il-2 ground attack aircraft, as well as Bell P-39 Airacobra and Hurricane fighters. At 18:15, 9. Staffel was scrambled at Pechenga and 5. Staffel at Svartnes. A bit later further Bf 109s from 4., 7. and 5. Staffel took off. The Germans intercepted the Soviet formation east of Ekkerøy over the Varangerfjord. In this aerial engagement, Schuck claimed the destruction of three P-39s and one Il-2. These four claims took his number of aerial victories to 50 and earned him a congratulatory note from Generaloberst Stumpff, at the time commander-in-chief of Luftflotte 5. Schuck was promoted to Oberfeldwebel (senior staff sergeant) on 1 October 1943.

In 1944, III. Gruppe flew its first mission in force on 29 January. That day, all three Staffeln took off at 11:40 and encountered a number of Yakovlev Yak-7 fighters from 122 IAD PVO (Istrebitel'naya Aviatsionnaya Diviziya Protivo-Vozdushnaya Oborona—Fighter Aviation Division of the Home Air Defense) south of Murmashi. During this encounter, III. Gruppe pilots filed four claims including two claims by Schuck. However, Soviet records only account for the loss of one aircraft. On 17 March, III. Gruppe was again tasked with providing a fighter escort for an inbound German convoy. In the timeframe 10:49 to 11:13, III. Gruppe claimed 17 aerial victories, including four by Schuck. At 15:17 that day, III. Gruppe was scrambled again and Schuck claimed three further aerial victories, making him an "ace-in-a-day" for the first time.

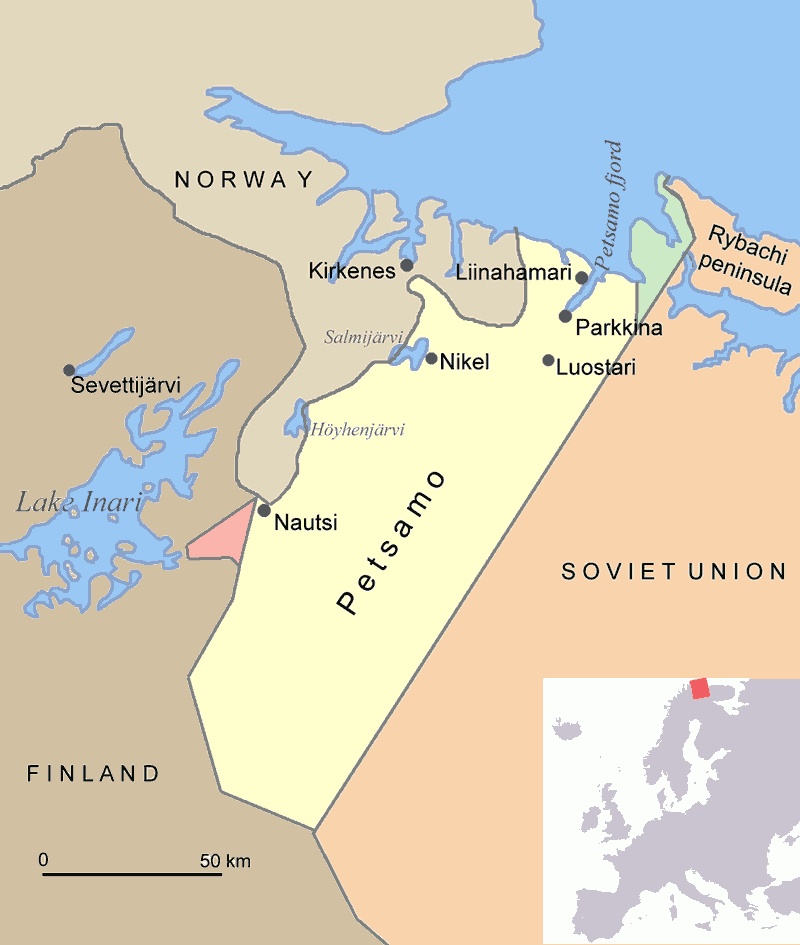
Area of operations

At 05:40 on 7 April, Schuck and his wingman Feldwebel Josef Bößenecker take off from Pechenga, providing escort for a westbound convoy. On this mission, Schuck claimed the destruction of three P-40s and an Il-2 approximately 10 kilometres (6.2 miles) west of the northern tip of the Rybachy Peninsula. Later that day, Schuck flew another convoy escort mission and claimed a P-39 shot down at 10:18 and another P-39 at 10:21, bringing his total to 84 aerial victories. On evening of the next day, Schuck received a phone call from General der Flieger (General of the Aviators) Josef Kammhuber, successor of Generaloberst Stumpff as commander-in chief Luftflotte 5, who informed him that he had been awarded the Knight's Cross of the Iron Cross (Ritterkreuz des Eisernen Kreuzes).

Parts of III. Gruppe were ordered to relocate from Pechenga to Svartnes at 17:17 on 25 May 1944. At 21:00, 19 Bf 109s under the leadership of Gruppenkommandeur (Group Commander) Major (Major) Heinrich Ehrler were scrambled from Svartnes to fend off approximately 80 Soviet aircraft attacking a German convoy. During this encounter, III. Gruppe claimed 33 aerial victories, including twenty "Boston" bombers, eight P-40s and five P-39s. However, Soviet records only account for five losses that day. The first aerial victory was credited to Schuck who claimed a "Boston" at 21:32 followed by five further claims, an "ace-in-a-day" achievement. The next day, Ehrler again led 19 Bf 109s from III. Gruppe in defense of the German convoy. This time the Germans reported combat with approximately 100 Soviet aircraft and claimed 40 aerial victories, among them four by Schuck. Again, Soviet records do not match this figure, they document the loss of nine aircraft.

On 28 May, III. Gruppe received an order to detach a fully staffed Staffel for service in Defense of the Reich. This Staffel was made up of pilots from 7. and 9. Staffel and augmented II. Gruppe of JG 5 which had already been chosen for service in Defense of the Reich. To retain the structure of III. Gruppe, a newly formed Kommandostaffel (commando squadron), later renamed to Eismeerstaffel (Arctic Sea squadron), was created to which Schuck was assigned.

On 15 June 1944, he claimed his 100th victory on a day when he shot down 6 aircraft, another "ace-in-a-day" achievement. He was the 78th Luftwaffe pilot to achieve the century mark. On 15 June 1944, as a German convoy is entering the Pechenga Bay, 7. Staffel was consistently tasked with providing fighter protection over the ships. At 19:10, the Germans were scrambled and had combat with twelve Il-2s, eight P-40s, ten P-39s and nine Yak-7s. Schuck reported the destruction of four P-40s, taking his total number of aerial victories to 101. According to the Soviet archives, none of the aircraft attacking Liinakhamari that evening failed to return. Two days later, he had his most successful day, claiming 12 aerial victories in 24 hours period. On 17 June 1944, III. Gruppe was still busy flying convoy escort missions. At 07:30, III. Gruppe took off to its largest aerial battle. That day, the Soviet Air Forces attacked with 227 aircraft. In two separate engagements, German pilots claimed 66 aerial victories. On the morning mission, the Germans claimed 36 Soviet aircraft shot down. That evening, they claimed 30 further aerial victories. These 66 claims are offset by twelve documented Soviet losses. The next day at 04:30, a reconnaissance aircraft was reported over the Zapadnaya Litsa River. Schuck and Leutnant Werner Gayko were scrambled and sighted a single Supermarine Spitfire taking pictures of the Kirkenes harbor. Diving down from 9,000 metres (30,000 feet) to 7,500 m (24,600 ft), Schuck closed the range to 30 metres (98 feet) before firing five rounds with his 20 mm MG 151/20 cannon and thirty rounds from his MG 131 machine gun. This short burst shot down Senior Lieutenant I. J. Popowitsch from 3./118 RAP (Reconnaissance Aviation Regiment) who managed to bail out wounded. This aerial victory was Schuck's 12th claim in a 24-hour period and his 113th in total. For these 12 claims, Schuck received a case of Champagne from General der Flieger Kammhuber.

=== Squadron leader ===
In August 1944, Schuck became Staffelkapitän (squadron leader) of 10. Staffel of JG 5. This career advancement was triggered on 1 August when Major Ehrler replaced Oberstleutnant (Lieutenant Colonel) Scholz as Geschwaderkommodore (Wing Commander) of JG 5. Scholz had been given the position of Jagdfliegerführer Norwegen. In consequence, Oberleutnant Dörr succeeded Ehrler as Gruppenkommandeur of III. Gruppe and Schuck was given command of 7. Staffel, which was then redesignated to 10. Staffel on 6 August. His new responsibility of Staffelkapitän did not come easily to Schuck, and discipline in 10./JG 5 deteriorated to the point that Geschwaderkommodore Ehrler intervened with Schuck, before Schuck managed to restore the necessary military discipline.

On 23 August, Schuck again became an "ace-in-a-day", among these five claims his 150th aerial victory. On 16 September 1944, III. Gruppe defended against a Soviet attack of approximately 40 aircraft on the airfields at Pechenga and Kirkenes. The Germans were scrambled at 11:50 and Schuck claimed two Soviet aircraft shot down. During this engagement, his friend Jakob Norz was killed in action. Later that afternoon, Schuck claimed another aerial victory with Feldwebel David Wollmann as his wingman. On 27 September, Schuck led 10. Staffel against an attack on Vadsø. Approximately 100 Soviet aircraft were intercepted by 9., 10., 11., 13. and 15. Staffel. In this aerial combat, German pilots claimed 25 aerial victories including three by Schuck. The Soviet records only document the loss of five P-39 fighters and one Boston bomber.

On 29 September, Schuck was wounded in combat with an Il-2 aircraft at the Pechenga airfield. His aircraft was hit in the cockpit and glass splinters struck his cheek and nose. A splinter penetrated his jaw and got stuck in one of his teeth. To remove this splinter he required surgery. While in the hospital recovering from this operation, Schuck received notice that he had been awarded the Knight's Cross of the Iron Cross with Oak Leaves (Ritterkreuz des Eisernen Kreuzes mit Eichenlaub). The presentation of the Oak Leaves was made on 7 November 1944 at the Reichsluftfahrtministerium (RLM—Ministry of Aviation) in Berlin by Reichsmarschall Hermann Göring. Schuck received this award together with twelve other soldiers on this day, among them were the Fallschirmjäger Generalmajor Heinz Trettner, Oberstleutnant Friedrich August Freiherr von der Heydte, and the ground attack and bomber pilots Hauptmann Franz Kieslich and Hauptmann Diether Lukesch. Schuck was the only fighter pilot so honored on this day.

Schuck was promoted to Oberleutnant on 10 November with a rank age (RDA—Rangdienstalter) dated back to 1 July 1944. On New Year's Day 1945, Theodor Weissenberger married his teenage love Cilly Vogel. Schuck was the best man at his wedding. Schuck returned to his unit on 10 January 1945 following a period of convalescence and vacation. On 16 February, twelve Royal Air Force North American P-51 Mustang fighters from No. 65 Squadron and ten De Havilland Mosquito fast bombers from No. 143, No. 235, No. 248 and No. 333 Squadron attacked German shipping in Norangsfjorden. At 14:30, 10. and 11. Staffel of JG 5 were scrambled at Gossa. Aerial combat occurred in the vicinity of the ships. During this encounter, Schuck claimed two P-51s shot down, his 197th and 198th victory. These two claims were his last victories with JG 5, three days later he was transferred.

=== Flying the Messerschmitt Me 262 ===
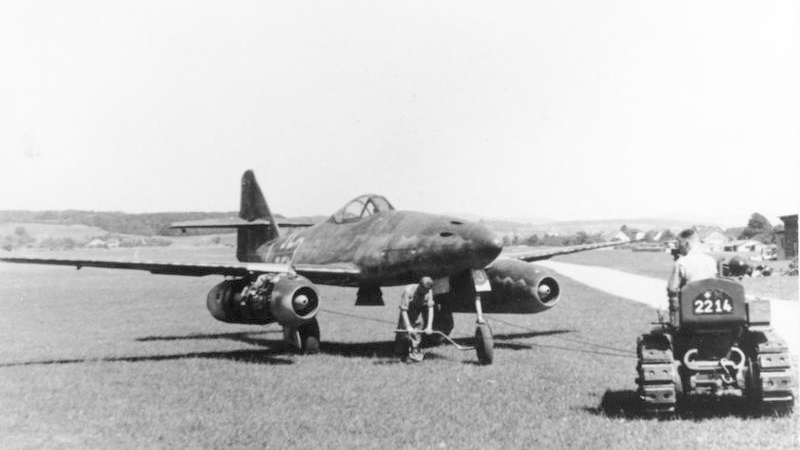
Me 262 A, circa 1944

After leaving JG 5, Schuck was trained on the Messerschmitt Me 262 jet fighter and joined Jagdgeschwader 7 (JG 7—7th Fighter Wing) on 5 March 1945. On 20 March 1945, he made his maiden flight on the Me 262. After a few more familiarizing flights on the Me 262, Schuck and another pilot took off on 24 March 1945 to familiarize themselves with the high altitude characteristics of the aircraft. Cruising at an altitude of 10,000 meters (33,000 ft), flight control informed them of enemy fighters in the vicinity. Schuck immediately set course for the enemy formation and spotted a Lockheed P-38 Lightning F-5 reconnaissance aircraft escorted by two P-51 fighters of the United States Army Air Forces (USAAF). In the resulting combat, Schuck shot down the two P-51 fighters and the P-38 was claimed by his wingman. (Note: According to Heaton, the Lockheed P-38 Lightning F-5 flown by Captain Armour G. McDaniel from 301st Fighter Squadron, escaped but suffered engine problems and the pilot was forced to bail out and was taken prisoner of war.) The two P-51s were flown by Flight Officer James T. Mitchell Jr. from 302d Fighter Squadron and Flight Officer Arnett W. Starks Jr. 301st Fighter Squadron, both pilots were captured and taken prisoner of war.

After Hans Waldmann was killed in a flying accident on 18 March 1945, Weissenberger appointed Schuck Staffelkapitän of the 3. Staffel on 26 March replacing Oberleutnant Walter Wagner, who had briefly led 3. Staffel. On 28 March, the USAAF targeted Berlin, Stendal and Hanover. That day, Schuck claimed another P-51 shot down, taking his total number of aerial victories to 201. On 7 April, Schuck shot down a P-38 F-5 reconnaissance aircraft piloted by Captain William T. Heily from the 30th Reconnaissance Squadron of the USAAF Ninth Air Force. (Note: According to Forsyth, Schuck shot down a North American P-51 Mustang in the vicinity of Wittenberge.)

On 10 April 1945, the USAAF Eighth Air Force targeted airfields, transportation hubs, and various military infrastructures at Oranienburg, Rechlin, Neuruppin, Stendal, Brandenburg-Briest, Zerbst, Burg, Parchim and Wittenberge. In total 1,232 Boeing B-17 Flying Fortress and Consolidated B-24 Liberator bombers, escorted by approximately 900 fighters, were committed to this attack. That day, Schuck led seven Me 262s from 3. Staffel and in the timeframe from 14:30 to 14:38 claimed four B-17s shot down in the vicinity of Oranienburg, taking his total to 206 aerial victories. One of the bombers was "Henn's Revenge" of the 303rd Bombardment Group, and another was "Moonlight Mission" of the 457th Bombardment Group. Shortly afterwards, his Me 262 was hit by a P-51 of the fighter escort, piloted by Lt. (later Colonel) Joe Peterburs of the 55th Fighter Squadron, 20th Fighter Group, forcing Schuck to bail out. Schuck sprained both ankles upon landing and the war ended before he recovered.

== Later life ==
After the war, Schuck worked as a flight instructor for the Syrian Air Force. In 2005 Schuck met Peterburs in person during a visit to the US. They both met on 18 May in Vista, California and became close friends. Schuck died on 27 March 2015 at the age of 94 in Neunkirchen, Germany.

== Summary of career ==
=== Aerial victory claims ===
According to US historian David T. Zabecki, Schuck was credited with 206 aerial victories. Spick also lists him with 206 aerial victories, 198 of which on the Eastern Front, and eight over the Western Allies flying the Me 262 jet fighter, including four four-engined heavy bombers. According to Dixon, Schuck flew approximately 500 combat missions. Mathews and Foreman, authors of Luftwaffe Aces — Biographies and Victory Claims, researched the German Federal Archives and found records for 181 aerial victory claims, plus nine further unconfirmed claims. This figure of confirmed claims includes 171 aerial victories on the Eastern Front and 10 on the Western Front, including four four-engined bombers and 8 victories with the Me 262 jet fighter.

=== Awards ===
- Flugzeugführerabzeichen (20 July 1940)
- Wound Badge in Black
- Order of the Cross of Liberty
- Iron Cross (1939)
  - 2nd class (19 May 1942)
  - 1st class (14 June 1942)
- Honour Goblet of the Luftwaffe on 23 March 1943 after 28 aerial victories (Note: According to Patzwall on 29 March 1943 as Feldwebel and pilot.)
- Front Flying Clasp of the Luftwaffe in Gold with Pennant "500"
  - in Gold on 26 January 1943 as Feldwebel
- German Cross in Gold on 24 June 1943 as Feldwebel in the 9./Jagdgeschwader 5
- Knight's Cross of the Iron Cross with Oak Leaves
  - Knight's Cross on 8 April 1944 as Oberfeldwebel and pilot in the 7./Jagdgeschwader 5
  - 616th Oak Leaves on 30 September 1944 as Leutnant and pilot in the 9./Jagdgeschwader 5
