= Domen, Norway =

Mountain on the Varanger Peninsula in Norway

Domen (Norwegian); Duommabávti (Northern Sami); Tuumeni (Kven)
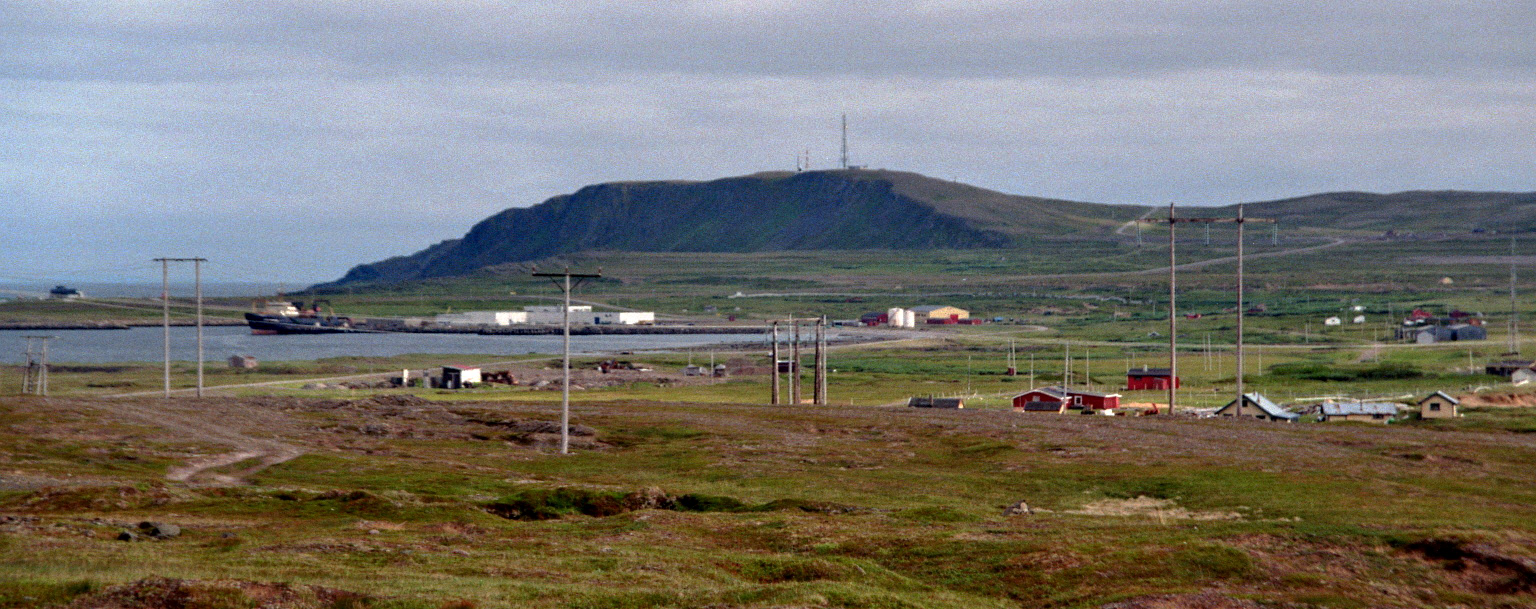

Highest point
- Elevation: 164 m (538 ft)
- Coordinates: 70°20′00″N 31°02′08″E

Geography
- Location of the mountain
- Location: Vardø Municipality, Finnmark, Norway

Domen (Norwegian), Duommabávti (Northern Sami), or Tuumeni (Kven) is a mountain on the Varanger Peninsula in eastern Finnmark county, Norway. The 164-metre (538 ft) tall mountain is located near the coast between the small fishing village Kiberg and the island of Vardøya. Domen is bare and flat-topped, with a steep slope towards the Barents Sea below. The European route E75 highway runs along the western side of the mountain from Svartnes to Kiberg. The road is often closed in the winter due to bad weather.

== Name ==
The Old Norse name of the Arctic Sea was Dumbshaf [ˈdumbsˌhɑv]. This sea (haf) was named after the mountain Dumbr [ˈdumbz̠] (an old form of Domen). The name is probably related to the English word dumb, but in what meaning is unclear.

== History and folklore ==
Domen is often associated with the witch trials in Finnmark during the 17th century. Vardø was the site of approximately 70 witch trials between 1601 and 1663. This was a large number, since there were only a couple of hundred inhabitants in the area at that time.

According to folklore, Vardø and Domen became infamous as the end of the world, Ultima Thule and the entrance to Hell was said to be somewhere around Domen or Vardø, and so witches flew to Domen to meet the devil for sabbath.

== See also ==
- Blockula
- Vardø witch trials
- Vardø witch trials (1621)
