= Vardø witch trials (1662–1663) =

Witch trials in northern Norway

The witch trials of Vardø were held in Vardø in Finnmark in Northern Norway in the winter of 1662–1663 and were one of the biggest in Scandinavia. Thirty women were put on trial, accused of sorcery and making pacts with the Devil. One was sentenced to a work house, two tortured to death, and eighteen were burned alive at the stake.

It was the third of the three big mass trials of Northern Norway, preceded by the Vardø witch trials (1621) and the Vardø witch trials (1651–1653), and one of the biggest witch trials in Norway. It was the peak of the witch hunt which had intensified in Northern Norway since the first mass trial in 1621. Vardø was the center of Norwegian Nordkalotten.

== The witch trial ==
=== Context ===
About 140 witch trials were held in Finnmark in the 17th century between 1601 and 1692 in what is sometimes considered as the worst persecution in times of peace in Norway according to Rune Hagen. 91 people were condemned to death sentences in these trials. The Steilneset Memorial is dedicated to these people persecuted as witches.

=== Beginning of the trial ===
On 2 September 1662, Dorthe Lauritzdotter was brought in for questioning at the Vardøhus fortress. She had been accused once before, but acquitted, in 1657. Lauritz Braas said that two of his servants, who had recently died, had claimed to be bewitched by her. Four witches led by Dorthe in the shape of a dove, an eagle, a crow and a swan were to have opened their "wind-knots" over the sea to make a boat sink, but the plot supposedly failed because the crew had prayed to God. Dorthe was burned at the stake on 6 November 1662 with two other women, soon followed by another two.

At Christmas 1662, children were accused when sisters Ingeborg Iversdatter and Karen Iversdatter (8 years old), children of one of the newly executed women, were brought in for questioning with Maren Olsdatter, the niece of one of the executed women. The children told many stories, and the priest had a hard time making them say the catechism when they were in the "trollkvinnefengeselhullet" (the "witches-hole") in the fortress, where witches were kept awaiting verdict.

== The Sabbath ==
Ingeborg Iversdatter confessed during interrogations on 26 January 1663 that she and Sølve Nilsdatter had celebrated Christmas 1662 in Kiberg with Maren Olsdatter and Sigri Klockare while incarcerated in the witches-hole. She and Solveig had transformed themselves into cats and crawled under the gate and met Maren and Sigri, who came flying over the sea from Vardangerfjorden, in Kiberg. They had broken into a basement and helped themselves to wine until they became drunk, while Satan held the candle for them. The two adult women had argued, and Sølve had become so drunk that Satan had a hard time getting her on her feet and back to jail later that night. The priest of the fortress pointed out that this must have been the reason why alcohol had disappeared from the basement.

Sølve Nilsdatter confessed during the interrogations in January that, in the Christmas of 1661, a gigantic witches' sabbath had been held at Dovrefjell mountain in southern Norway, where the witches had arrived in the shapes of dogs and cats to drink and dance with Satan, who appeared in the shape of a black dog. When Margrette Jonsdotter danced with him, she had lost her shoe, but Satan had given her a new one.

== Child witnesses ==
Twelve-year-old Maren Olsdatter's mother had been executed for sorcery years before; the girl had been taken care of by her aunt, and now, after her aunt had also been burned, she herself had been arrested. When Maren was interrogated on 26 January, her confession was given much attention. She claimed to have visited Hell, where she had been given a tour by Satan. Satan had shown her "a great water" down in a black valley, which began to boil when he blew fire through a horn of iron. In the water there had been people, who cried like cats.

He had put a ham in the water and it was cooked immediately, and told her that she too would boil in the water as a reward if she served him. Later she had visited the sabbath of Satan on Domen between Svartnes and Kiberg, where Satan played dancing music on a red violin, gave the witches beer, and followed each of them home personally. When the court asked her which people she had seen there, she gave the names of five women, among them Ingeborg Krog from Makkaur, who she said had followed her to Hell in the shape of a dove.

Ingeborg Krog was brought in for questioning. She denied the accusations and was subjected to the ordeal of water. When she failed the test, and continued to plead her innocence, she was subjected to torture. She confessed nothing under torture, except for one story which did not satisfy the court: she claimed that she had once eaten a fish she had been offered by a woman who had been executed for sorcery in 1653, and may have consumed some magic at that occasion.

Sölve Nilsdotter then said that Ingeborg was just as much a witch as the rest of them, that she had made a boat get lost at sea, and that it was in fact she who had taught them to avoid revealing anything. Ingeborg continued to assert her innocence. She was cut with burning iron and sulphur was put on her chest, but the only thing she said was, " I cannot lie on myself or on others. Oh no, such can they torment the body, but they cannot torment my soul. " Ingeborg was tortured to death and her corpse was laid on an island opposite the gallows.

Eight-year-old Karen Iversdatter claimed that three witches in the shape of crows had attempted to assassinate the official with a needle. Maid Ellen was arrested for being one of them, and confessed that she had used sorcery to affect cattle. Ellen was burned with Sigri Klockare on 27 February 1663.

Barbra from Vadsø was pointed out by Maren as one of those who had been flying with Dorthe on Domen. Barbra said that Maren had accused her, encouraged by doctor's wife Anne Rhodius, who had been exiled from Oslo to northern Norway with her husband because of conflicts in Oslo, and that the doctor and his wife had pointed out the wife and daughter of one of the members of the court as witches. This was ignored and Barbra was burned with four other women 8 April 1663.

Sölve Nilsdotter, Margrette Jonsdotter, and two more women were burned to death in Vardø on 20 March 1663.

== Aftermath ==
On 25 June 1663 the last accused witches, Magdalene from Andersby, Ragnhild Endresdatter and Gertrude Siversdatter, along with her daughter Kirsten Sørensdatter, were brought from the witches-hole. They claimed that Maren and the other children had come up with their confessions under the influence of the exiled Anne Rhodius, who had also visited them in jail and threatened them with torture to make them confess. Magdalene, Gertrude and Ragnhild were freed. All the children were acquitted in June 1663.

Maren Olsdatter told the Court of Appeal judge that Anne Rhodius had misled her to lie against other people, denouncing them for witchcraft. According to a document in the archives of the Regional Governor of Finnmark, the Court of Appeal Judge, Mandrup Scønnebøl, sentenced Maren for having lied on herself and others, to stay for some time at the workhouse in Bergen. However this is not entered into the Court of Appeals protocol, and was probably not effectuated, as there is documentation that she lived in Vardø after 1663. Doctor Ambrosius Rhodius was pardoned by a letter from the King of 2 July 1666 but his wife, Anne Fredericksdatter Rhodius, lived in exile in Vardø fortress in Finnmark until her death in 1672.

This was the last of the many great witch trials of Northern Norway. More people were accused in the following decades, but only two of those cases (in 1678 and 1695) led to a death sentence.

== Vardø witch trials in culture ==
In September 2023, the book The Witches of Vardø by Anya Bergman was published, recounting the events of the Vardø witch trials in the 17th century. The novel blends historical facts with fiction, exploring themes of persecution, superstition, and survival in the harsh conditions of Norway at the time. The book contributes to contemporary cultural reflections on these tragic events and highlights the history associated with the witch trials.

== See also ==
- Anne Pedersdotter
- Kirsti Sörensdotter

== Literature ==
- Rune Blix Hagen, Heksenes julekveld, Julemotiv i norske trolldomsprosesser((in Norwegian))
- Liv Helene Willumsen, The Witchcraft Trials in Finnmark Northern Norway (In English & Norwegian)
- Liv Helene Willumsen, Witches of the North, Scotland and Finnmark
