= VAW =

VAW may refer to:

- Violence against women
- Vehicle As a Weapon, another name for a vehicle-ramming attack
- Vardø Airport, Svartnes, airport IATA code
- VAW-### is the United States Navy designation for a Fixed Wing Airborne Early Warning Squadron
