= Vardø witch trials (1621) =

Witch trials in northern Norway

The Vardø witch trials (Heksejakten i Vardø), which took place in Vardø in Finnmark in Northern Norway in 1621, was the first major witch trial of Northern Norway and one of the biggest witch trials in Scandinavia. It was the first of the three big mass trials of Northern Norway, followed by the Vardø witch trials (1651–1653) and the Vardø witch trials (1662-1663).

== Background ==
On 24 December 1617 Eastern Finnmark in northern Norway suffered a terrible storm, where "sea and sky became one." This happened suddenly, "as if loosened from a bag." A great majority of the male population was out at sea at that time and were surprised by the storm, which sank ten boats and drowned forty men. The same year, the new law of sorcery and witchcraft for the union of Denmark-Norway was issued and announced in Finnmark in 1620.

== Witch trial ==
In the winter and spring of 1621 a witch trial took place at the Vardøhus Fortress in Vardø, the center of Norwegian Finnmark. There a woman from Kiberg, Mari Jørgensdatter, was interrogated under torture on 21 January. She said that Satan had come to her at night at Christmas 1620 and asked her to follow him to the house of her neighbor Kirsti Sørensdatter. He asked her if she would serve him, and she said yes, after which he gave her the witch's brand by biting her between the fingers of her left hand.

Then they went to Kirsti, who said that Mari was to come with her to a Christmas party at Lydhorn mountain outside the city of Bergen in Western Norway, over 1,600 kilometers away. She then threw the skin of a fox over Mari and transformed her into the shape of a fox.

When Mari flew with Kirsti through the air south towards the sabbath of Satan she saw many people she knew doing the same, mostly women but also two men; they came from Kiberg, Vardø, Ekkerøy, Vadsø and other communities along the Varangerfjorden, transformed into cats, dogs, sea monsters and birds so they would not be recognized.

On the top of Lydhorn mountain Satan's Christmas party was celebrated with dance and drink, after which the witches flew back to Finnmark, except for Kirsti, who had visited Bergen and then took the long way home by sea.

Mari also confessed that witches were responsible for the great storm of 1617. She claimed that the witches had caused the storm because of neighbor conflicts at Christmas 1617 and made many men drown. They had also had sexual intercourse with devils and demons while their men were at sea.

Another woman interrogated in January, Else Knutsdatter, confirmed that in the Christmas of 1617, the witches had tied a fishing rope three times, spat at it and untied it, after which "the sea rose like ashes and people were killed." Else was arrested after she was seen in the company of demons in the shapes of black cats and dogs, and was exposed to the ordeal of water.

Anne Larsdatter from Vadsø, who was exposed to the ordeal of water, claimed in her confession that the Devil tied the tongues of witches so they could neither cry or confess until they were exposed to the ordeal of water. She said that she had flown to a witches' sabbath on Baldvolden outside of Vardø, where she had seen forty others. She had partied so that she barely had time to get home to her bed before it was time to get up for church on Christmas morning. Many of the women interrogated between January and February 1621 pointed out Kirsti Sørensdatter as their leader and admiral.

== Kirsti Sørensdatter ==
After these confessions, Kirsti Sørensdatter was brought in for questioning. She was arrested on her arrival home by ship after her visit to Bergen. This supported what the other women had said: Kirsti did not go home with the rest of them after the Sabbath of 1620; she visited Bergen. Kirsti was married to the wealthy merchant Anders Johanssen and came from Helsingør in Denmark, where she was said to have learned sorcery from an old woman. Under torture, she confirmed everything and pointed out several women and also two men, one being the bailiff Bertel Hendrikssen. However, none of these others were arrested.

Kirsti was sentenced to be burned alive at the stake on 28 April 1621, a couple of months before ten other women had been burnt for sorcery. She became the last victim of the great witch trial of 1621.

== Aftermath ==
During the 17th century Finnmark had many witch trials. Northern Norway was a place with weak central security, where the local authorities had a great deal of power. These officials were not Norwegians, but often men from Scotland, Germany and Denmark, countries with a history of witch trials. They were influenced by the contemporary prejudice in Europe, where religious experts often claimed that "The evil came from North," from Nordkalotten, the home of the Sami people, who were not Christians and had a strong reputation for sorcery.

These officials often believed in the teachings of the European clerics that "magic came with the Northern wind" down over Europe, and they had been placed there to correct the population according to Protestant orthodoxy. They painted the Sami as a people of magicians, and disapproved of Norwegian women along the coast being alone at home for months when their husbands were out at sea fishing, suspecting them of committing adultery with demons. About 150 people were executed for sorcery in Northern Norway between 1621 and 1663, before legal security and administration became better organized in 1666. Of these, all the men were Sami and most of the women were Norwegians.

== Memorial opened in June 2011 ==
On June 23, 2011 Norway's Queen Sonja opened the Steilneset Memorial to the Victims of the Witch Trials in Vardø, a new monument by the Swiss architect Peter Zumthor and the French-American artist Louise Bourgeois. It is also hoped that the Steilneset Memorial will draw visitors to a remote and economically depressed region of Norway. The Vardø project is also part of the Norwegian Public Roads administration’s National Tourist Routes program, through which distinctive buildings are being erected to encourage visits to outposts of exceptional natural beauty.

== See also ==
- Anne Pedersdotter
- Torsåker witch trials
- Domen, Norway
- Vardø Witch Trials

== Other sources ==
- Alm, Ellen Janette. Statens rolle i trolldomsprosessene i Danmark og Norge på 1500- og 1600-tallet (Thesis, University of Tromso: 2000)
- Willumsen, Liv Helene Seventeenth-Century Witchcraft Trials in Scotland and Northern Norway (Thesis, University of Edinburgh: 2008)
