= Svartnes =

- Village
- Interactive map of Svartnes
- Location within Finnmark Location within Norway
- Coordinates: 70°21′31″N 31°01′51″E
- Country: Norway
- Region: Northern Norway
- County: Finnmark
- District: Øst-Finnmark
- Municipality: Vardø Municipality
- Elevation: 17 m (56 ft)
- Time zone: UTC+01:00 (CET)
  - Summer (DST): UTC+02:00 (CEST)
- Post Code: 9950 Vardø

Svartnes is a small village and port in Vardø Municipality, Finnmark county, Norway. It is located on the mainland of the Varanger Peninsula across the Bussesundet strait from the island of Vardøya where the town of Vardø is located. Svartnes has a large harbor and port, protected by a large breakwater. The Vardø Airport, Svartnes is also located here. The European route E75 highway runs through Svartnes, just before entering the Vardø Tunnel which goes under the strait and connects to the town of Vardø. The village of Kiberg lies about 10 kilometres (6.2 mi) to the south. The mountain Domen lies just south of Svartnes.
