= Krampenes =

Krampenes: Krampenes (Norwegian); Ganešnjárga (Northern Sami); Kramppinen (Kven)
- Village
- View of the village (in 1989)
- Interactive map of Krampenes
- Location within Finnmark Location within Norway
- Coordinates: 70°06′18″N 30°11′44″E
- Country: Norway
- Region: Northern Norway
- County: Finnmark
- District: Øst-Finnmark
- Municipality: Vadsø Municipality
- Elevation: 3 m (9.8 ft)
- Time zone: UTC+01:00 (CET)
  - Summer (DST): UTC+02:00 (CEST)
- Post Code: 9800 Vadsø

Krampenes (Norwegian), Ganešnjárga (Northern Sami), or Kramppinen (Kven) is a village in Vadsø Municipality in Finnmark county, Norway. It is located on the northern shore of the Varangerfjorden on the eastern shore of the Varanger Peninsula. It lies along the European route E75 highway, about 5 kilometres (3.1 mi) northeast of Valen and Ekkerøy. The small island of Lille Ekkerøy lies about 2 kilometres (1.2 mi) off the coast of Krampenes.

The majority of the village population is Norwegian as well as some Sami residents. The Sami reindeer herders on the Varanger Peninsula bring their reindeer to the slaughtering facilities in Krampenes each year, and they recruit their labour force for the slaughtering plant from the Norwegians in Krampenes.
