= Aksel Jacobsen Bogdanoff =

Norwegian resistance fighter

- Born: 22 November 1922; Lille Ekkerøy, Norway
- Died: 1 June 1971 (aged 48); Oslo, Norway
- Partner: Anne Lise Bogdanoff
- Children: Arvid Sigfred Bogdanoff
- Parents: Jacob Wilhelm Bogdanoff (father); Signe Victoria Bogdanoff (mother)

Aksel Jacobsen Bogdanoff (22 November 1922 – 1 June 1971) was a Norwegian who fought as Soviet-controlled partisan in eastern Finnmark in World War II and, in 1953, he was one of two brothers who encountered and shot the last polar bear seen in Finnmark, at Lille Ekkerøy.

== Part of the last generation to live on Lille Ekkerøy ==
Lille Ekkerøy

Aksel Jacobsen Bogdanoff was one of eleven children born to Signe Victoria Bogdanoff (1892–1963), née Dahl, from Tromsø, and Jacob Wilhelm Bogdanoff (1878–1940), whose father came from Russia. The other children included: Alfred; Francis; Olav (1917–2002); Karl (1916-1987); Frits (1915-1981); Ingvar (1920–1995), also known as Ingvald; Daniel (1931-1987); and Agnes (1933-2014). The children, three of whom died at an early age, were the last generation who lived on Lille Ekkerøy in Vadsø Municipality. They were evacuated during the war, moved to Krampenes, but returned and lived there until about 1953, when they moved back to Krampenes. As part of their subsistence tactics, they collected driftwood on the beach and picked cloudberries in the fields. Aksel married Anne Lise and, before their divorce, had a son called Arvid Sigfred Bogdanoff.

== Partisan service ==
After training as a radio operator in the Soviet Union, Bogdanoff, in April 1944, parachuted alone onto Kvaløya island and set up a radio bearing on the Torskefjord height between large stones. In connection with the Porsa action, he was captured and tortured by a German search party on 9 June 1944. He revealed nothing but he is supposed to have made some deal which the Germans honoured, resulting in his survival.

== Polar bear ==
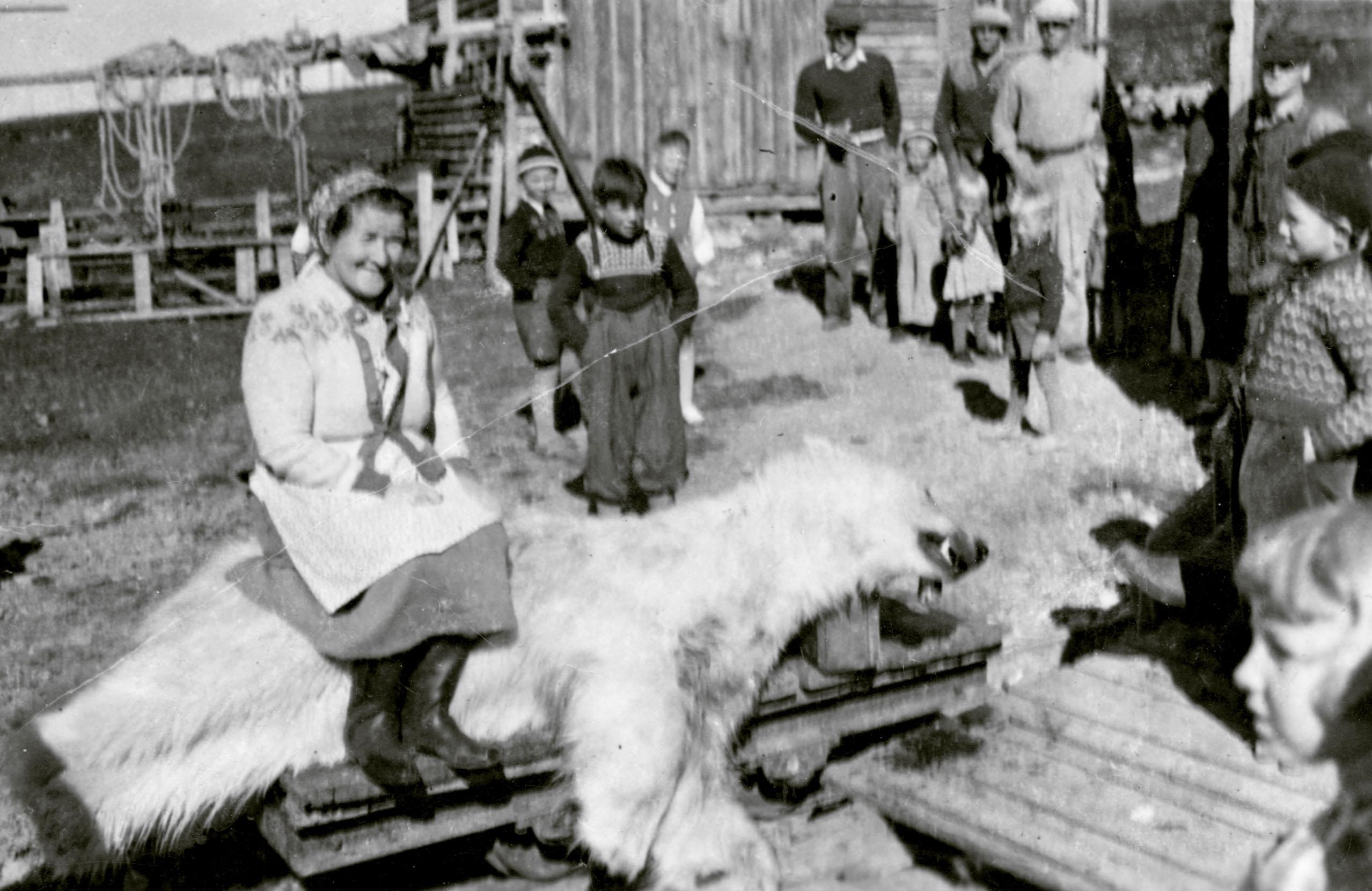
Signe Bogdanoff sitting on the polar bear.

In 1953, when Aksel and Ingvald Bogdanoff were out inspecting their salmon nets in the Lille Ekkeroy area, they encountered a polar bear which is believed to have come on an ice-floe from Svalbard. They shot and killed the bear. This is the last time that a polar bear was seen in Finnmark.
