= Steilneset Memorial =

Monument in Vardø, Norway

Coordinates: 70.3695°N 31.0918°E

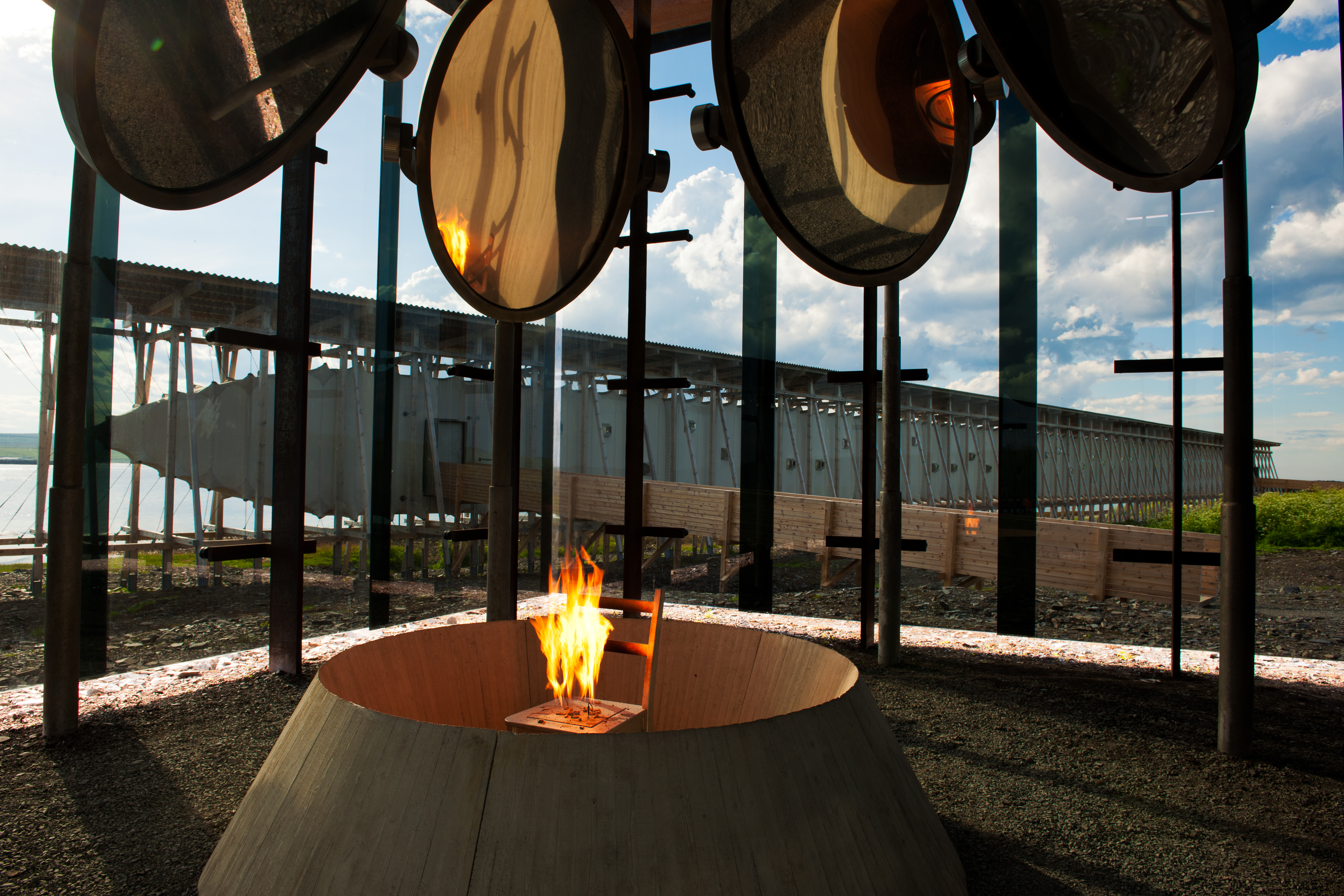
- Installation by Louise Bourgeois at Vardø, Steilneset
- Interactive map of Steilneset Memorial
- Location: Vardø, Norway
- Designer: Louise Bourgeois and Peter Zumthor
- Completion date: 2011

The Steilneset Memorial is a monument in the town of Vardø in Vardø Municipality in Finnmark county, Norway. The monument commemorates the trial and execution in 1621 of 91 people for witchcraft. The memorial was designed by artist Louise Bourgeois and architect Peter Zumthor and was opened in 2011. It was Bourgeois' last major work.

== Background ==
In the seventeenth century, a series of witch trials occurred in Norway, of which the Vardø witch trials were among the most substantial. Over a hundred people were tried for witchcraft, with 77 women and 14 men being burned at the stake. The northern district of Finnmark, within which Vardø lies, experienced the highest rate of accusations of witchcraft of any part of Norway, and an unusually high proportion of executions arising from the trials. The trials peaked in 1662–1663; the memorial was built 348 years later.

== Memorial ==
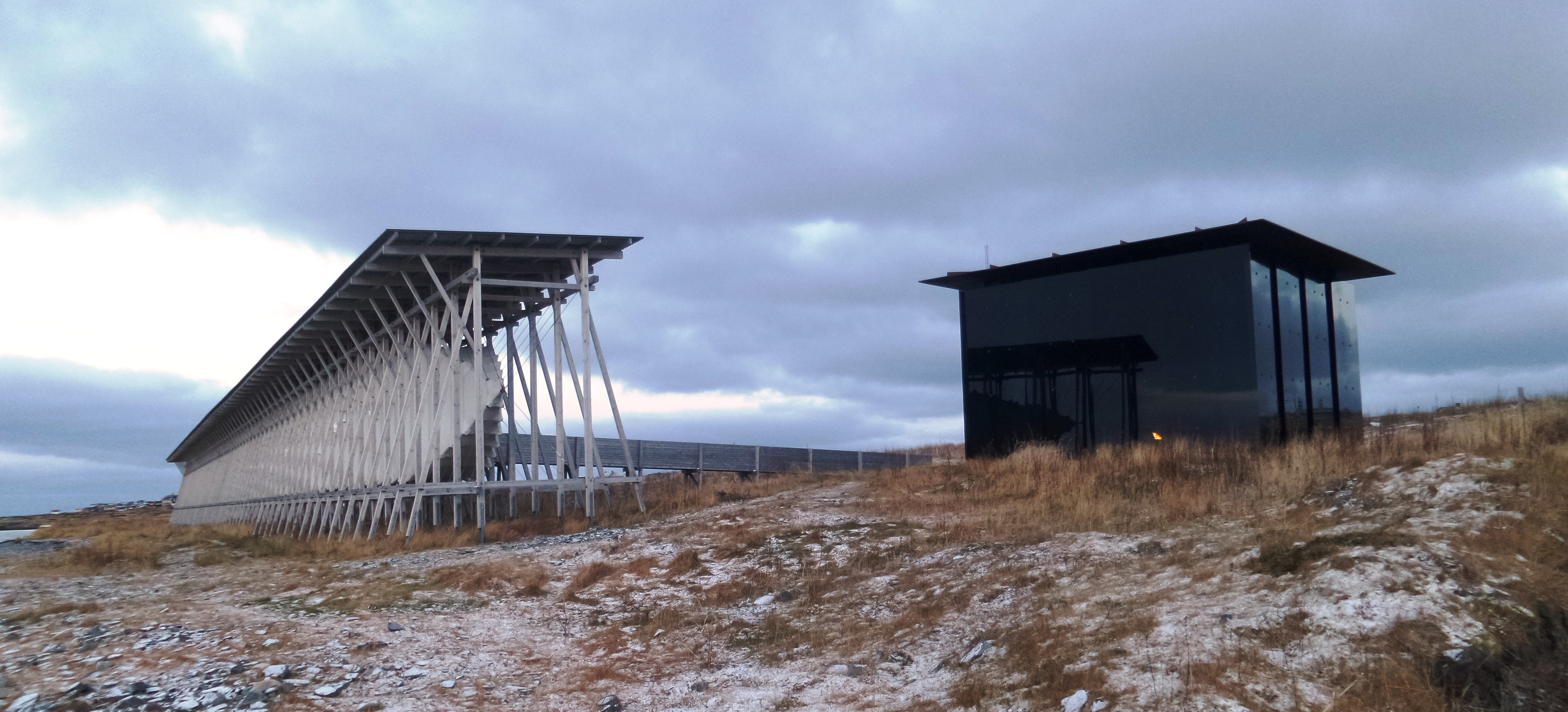
Both buildings

The Steilneset Memorial was jointly commissioned by the town of Vardø, Finnmark County, the Varanger Museum, and the Norwegian Public Roads Administration, and has been associated with the development of the National Tourist Routes in Norway. Norwegian architects designed the public architecture associated with the routes, such as lookouts, under competitive tender, but the memorial was the result of a specific commission. A collaboration between French-American artist Louise Bourgeois and previous winner of the Pritzker Prize, Swiss architect Peter Zumthor, design commenced in 2006, and the monument was opened by Queen Sonja of Norway on 23 June 2011. Bourgeois died in 2010, and her contribution to the project, titled The Damned, The Possessed and The Beloved, was her last major installation.

The Memorial comprises two separate buildings: a 410-foot (120 m) long wooden structure framing a fabric cocoon that contains Zumthor's installation; and a square smoked glass room, its roof 39 feet (12 m) on each side, that contains the work of Bourgeois. Zumthor's structure is made from wooden frames, fabricated off-site and assembled to create sixty bays in a long line within which, suspended by cable-stays, is a coated fibreglass membrane that tapers at each end. Inside is a timber walkway, 328 feet (100 m) long but just 5 feet (1.5 m) wide, and along the narrow corridor are 91 randomly placed small windows representing those executed, each one accompanied by an explanatory text based on original sources. Through each window can be seen a single lightbulb, intended to evoke "the lamps in the small curtainless windows of the houses" of the region.

The building that houses Bourgeois' installation stands in stark contrast to its companion. Its square structure is fabricated from weathering steel and 17 panes of tinted glass, forming walls that stop short of the ceiling and floor. Inside, Bourgeois has set a metal chair with flames projecting through its seat. This is reflected "in seven oval mirrors placed on metal columns in a ring around the fiery seat, like judges circling the condemned." Writer Donna Wheeler, reflecting on Bourgeois' sculpture with its fire burning within the solitary chair, observed: "The perpetual flame – that old chestnut of commemoration and reflection – here is devoid of any redemptive quality, illuminating only its own destructive image".
