= Vardø witch trials (1651–1653) =

Prosecutions in Northern Norway

The Vardø witch trials of 1651–1653 took place in Vardø in Northern Norway. It resulted in the death of seventeen women by burning. It was the second of the three big mass trials of Northern Norway, preceded by the Vardø witch trials (1621) and succeeded by the Vardø witch trials (1662-1663), and one of the biggest witch trials in Norway. It centered around women accused of having caused - or attempted - to have cause ship wrecks by use of witchcraft, and who were exposed to torture and pointed out each other as accomplices.
