= Joe Peterburs =

United States Air Force pilot (born 1924)

Col. Joseph Anthony Peterburs (born November 24, 1924) is a retired United States Air Force pilot most remembered for an 10 April 1945 shoot down from his propeller-powered North American P-51 Mustang of a technically superior Messerschmitt Me 262 turbojet piloted by Luftwaffe fighter ace Walter Schuck, who survived the crash. It was 60 years before the shoot down was confirmed by German historians, and their work led to a friendship between the former enemies.

Peterburs was the recipient of a Bronze Star, a Purple Heart and the Distinguished Flying Cross.

== Early life and education ==
Peterburs was born in November 24, 1924 in St Paul, Minnesota. (Note: He was born 25 Nov 1924.) He was the son of Minnie W. Peterburs. (Note: His parents were William and Wilhemina Peterburs.)

== Career ==
Petersburs enlisted in 1942. He served with the US Air Force during WWII. In 1945, he was stationed in Northamptonshire, England. When escorting bombers over Germany on 10 April 1945, Petersburs' propeller-powered P-51 Mustang shot down a Messerschmitt Me 262 turbojet piloted by Luftwaffe pilot Walter Schuck. Later in the same mission, he himself was shot down by a different aircraft. Before being shot down, Peterburs had flown 49 combat missions. Peterburs was held at Stalag III in Luckenwalde but escaped a week later.

Peterburs also served in the Korean and Vietnam wars. Over the course of his career, Peterburs received numerous awards and honors including the Bronze Star, Purple Heart and the Distinguished Flying Cross.

In 2002, Petersburs' shoot-down was confirmed by German historians. Their work led to a friendship between the pilots and former enemies, Petersburg and Schuck.

== Retirement ==
He retired in 1969 at the rank of colonel. Peterburs continues to give presentations about his career. He flew a Mustang, in 2025, aged 100.
