= Vardø Tunnel =

Tunnel in Vardø, Norway

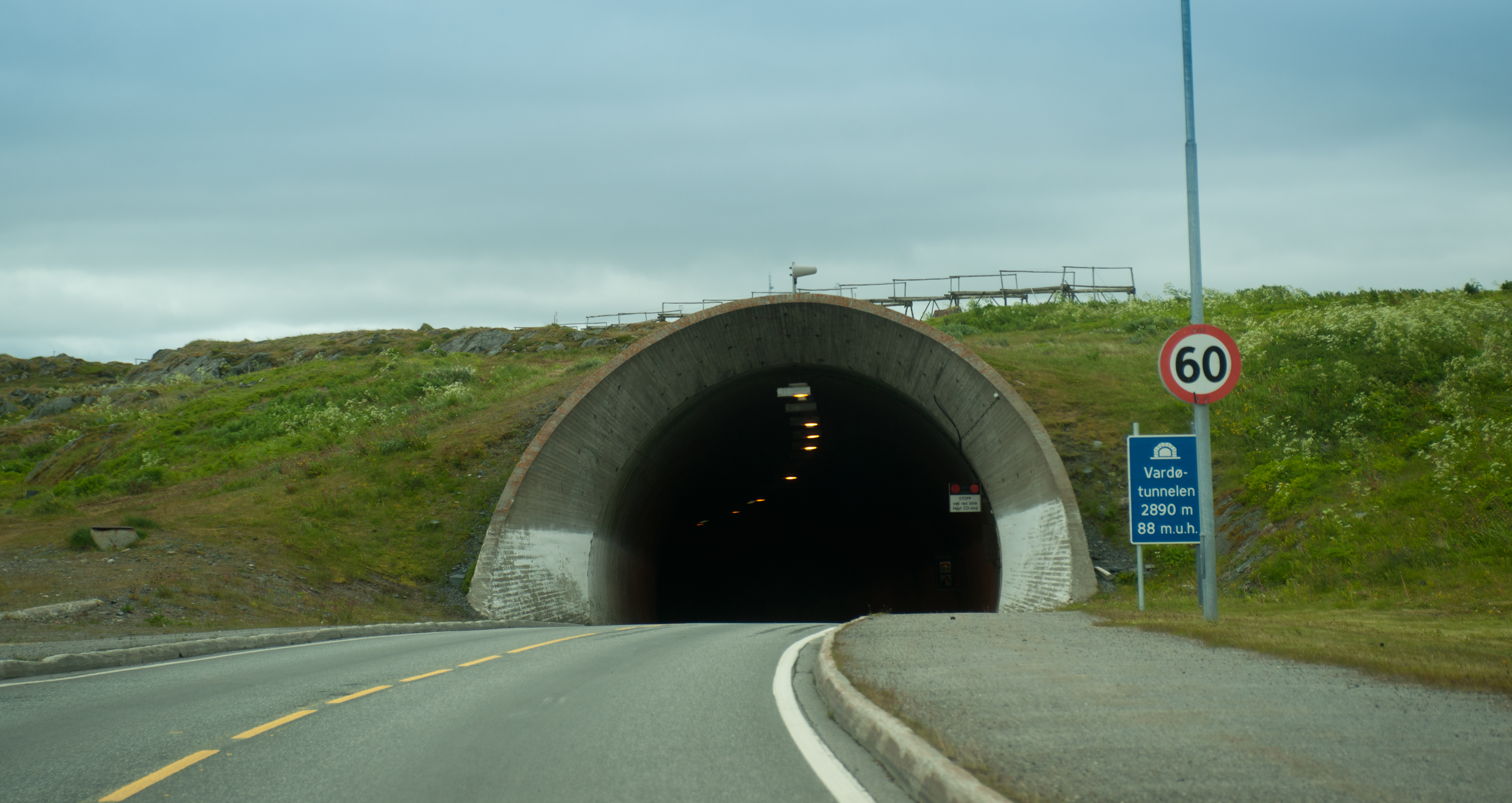
- Entrance from the island
- Interactive map of Vardø Tunnel

Overview
- Location: Vardø, Finnmark, Norway
- Coordinates: 70°21′36″N 31°4′15″E
- Status: In use
- Route: E75
- Start: Svartnes
- End: Vardø

Operation
- Work began: 1979
- Opened: 1982
- Traffic: Road Traffic

Technical
- Length: 2,890 metres (9,480 ft)
- No. of lanes: 2
- Min elevation: −88 metres (−289 ft)
- Width: 9.4 metres (31 ft)
- Grade: 8%

The Vardø Tunnel (Norwegian: Vardøtunnelen) is a subsea road tunnel in Vardø Municipality in Finnmark county, Norway. The 2,890-metre (9,480 ft) long two-lane tunnel under the Bussesundet strait connects the island of Vardøya to the village of Svartnes on the Varanger Peninsula on the mainland. The tunnel is part of the European Route E75 highway and it reaches a depth of 88 metres (289 ft) below sea level. The tunnel opened in 1982 and was the first subsea tunnel in Norway. King Olav V officially opened the tunnel on 16 August 1983.
