= List of World War II evacuations =

Several instances of evacuations (including both emergency evacuations and forced migrations) occurred during and after World War II.

== Forced migrations ==
- World War II evacuation and expulsion, an overview of the major forced migrations
  - Forced migration of Poles, Ukrainians, Belarusians, and Russians to Germany as forced labour
  - Forced migration of Jews to Nazi concentration camps in the General Government.
  - Expulsion of Germans after World War II from areas occupied by the Red Army
  - Evacuation of East Prussia
  - Forced internment of Japanese Americans in internment camps, primarily in the western United States.
  - NKVD prisoner massacres

== Civilian emergency evacuations ==
- Evacuations of civilians in Britain during World War II, the emergency evacuation of children from British urban areas during the Battle of Britain
- Evacuation of population in the Western Soviet Union in the wake of Operation Barbarossa
- Evacuation of Finnish Karelia
- Finnish war children
- Evacuations of civilians in Japan during World War II

== Military evacuations ==
- Operation Dynamo, British evacuation of the British Expeditionary Force from Dunkirk, France, 1940
- Operation Aerial, British evacuation of Allied forces from Western France, 1940
- Operation Cycle, British evacuation of the Beauman Division of Le Havre, France, 1940
- Operation Alphabet, British evacuation of Allied forces from Narvik, Norway, 1940
- Evacuations of Commonwealth forces from Greece and Crete during the Battle of Greece, 1941
- Evacuation for Odessa during the Siege of Odessa
- Evacuation from Crimea during the Crimea Campaign
- Evacuations during the Siege of Leningrad
- Operation Ke, Japanese evacuation from Guadalcanal, Jan-Feb 1943
- Japanese evacuation from Kiska, July 1943
- Allied invasion of Sicily, Axis evacuation order to the Royal Italian Army over the Strait of Messina to Italy, 1943
- Operation Hannibal, German evacuation of the Wehrmacht from East Prussia in advance of the Red Army, 1945
- Evacuation of Tallinn

== Industrial evacuations ==
- Evacuation of industries from western USSR to the Urals
- Evacuation of industries from western USSR to Central Asia
- Evacuation of industries from western USSR to Kazakhstan
- Evacuation of industries from western USSR to the Caucasus
