= Valen, Vadsø =

Valen (Norwegian); Ihkkuidválla (Northern Sami)
- Hamlet
- Interactive map of: Valen (Norwegian); Ihkkuidválla (Northern Sami)
- Location within Finnmark Location within Norway
- Coordinates: 70°04′43″N 30°05′29″E
- Country: Norway
- Region: Northern Norway
- County: Finnmark
- District: Øst-Finnmark
- Municipality: Vadsø Municipality
- Elevation: 4 m (13 ft)
- Time zone: UTC+01:00 (CET)
  - Summer (DST): UTC+02:00 (CEST)
- Post Code: 9800 Vadsø

Valen (Norwegian) or Ihkkuidválla (Northern Sami) is a tiny hamlet in Vadsø Municipality in Finnmark county, Norway. It is located at the mainland end of the narrow isthmus of land which joins the small Ekkerøy peninsula to the mainland Varanger Peninsula. The small hamlet lies just off the European route E75 highway, about 15 kilometres (9.3 mi) east of the town of Vadsø. The bay on the northeastern side of the isthmus is called Yttersida and that on the southwestern side is called Innersida.
