= Kiberg =

Kiberg: Kiberg (Norwegian); Kiiperi (Kven)
- Village
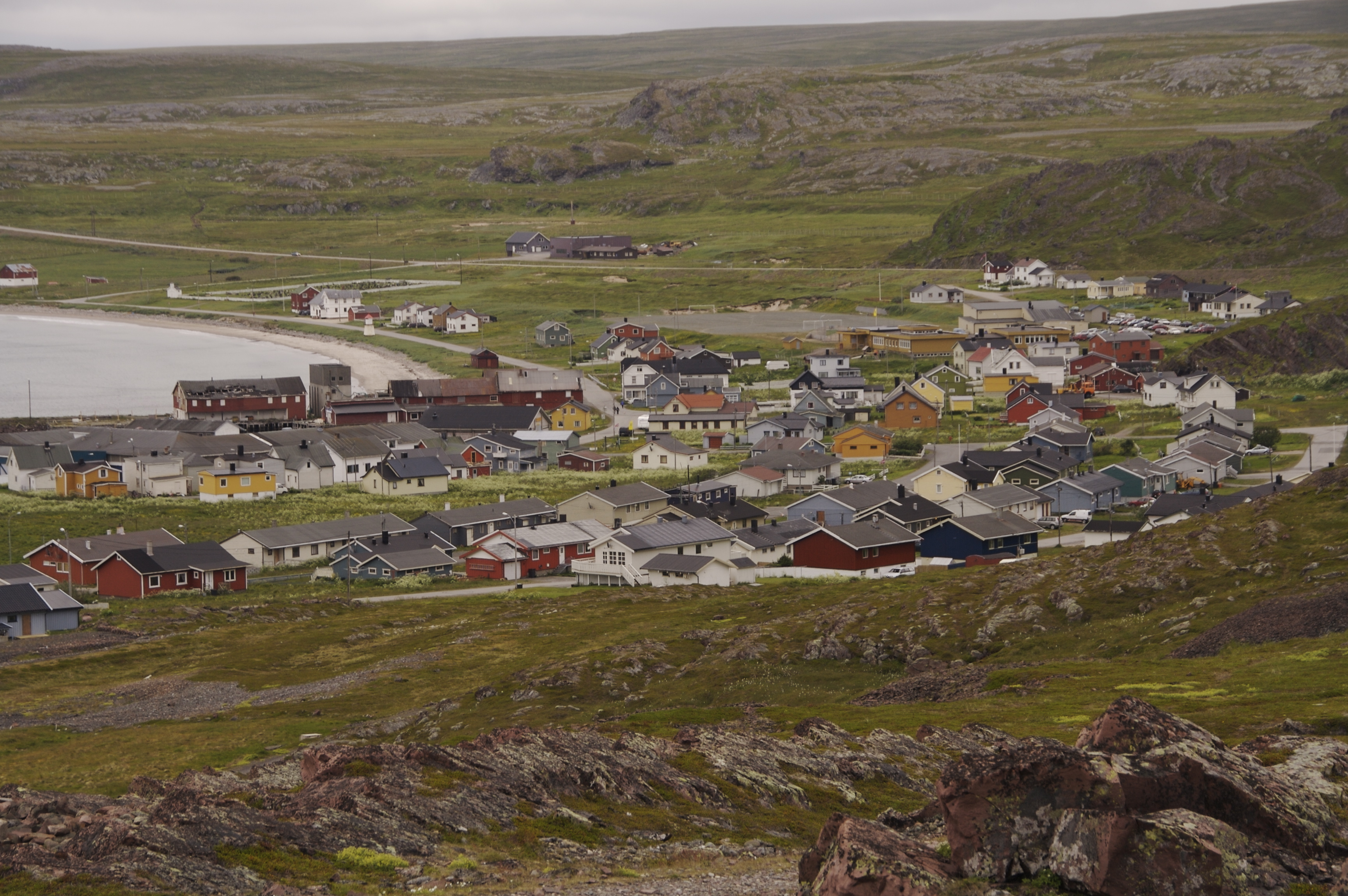
- View of the village
- Interactive map of Kiberg
- Location within Finnmark Location within Norway
- Coordinates: 70°17′07″N 30°59′53″E
- Country: Norway
- Region: Northern Norway
- County: Finnmark
- District: Øst-Finnmark
- Municipality: Vardø Municipality

Area
  - Total: 0.3 km^{2} (0.12 sq mi)
- Elevation: 3 m (9.8 ft)

Population (2017)
  - Total: 202
  - Density: 673/km^{2} (1,740/sq mi)
- Time zone: UTC+01:00 (CET)
  - Summer (DST): UTC+02:00 (CEST)
- Post Code: 9960 Kiberg

Kiberg (Norwegian) or Kiiperi (Kven) is a village in Vardø Municipality in eastern Finnmark county, Norway. It is located on the eastern end of the Varanger Peninsula, along the Barents Sea. Kiberg is the second largest settlement in Vardø municipality. It is situated about 10 kilometres (6.2 mi) southwest of the municipal centre, the town of Vardø. Kibergsneset (Cape Kiberg) is the easternmost spot on the Norwegian mainland, and it is located just east of the village. The 0.28-square-kilometre (69-acre) village has a population (2013) of 202, which gives the village a population density of 721 inhabitants per square kilometre (1,870/sq mi).

== History ==
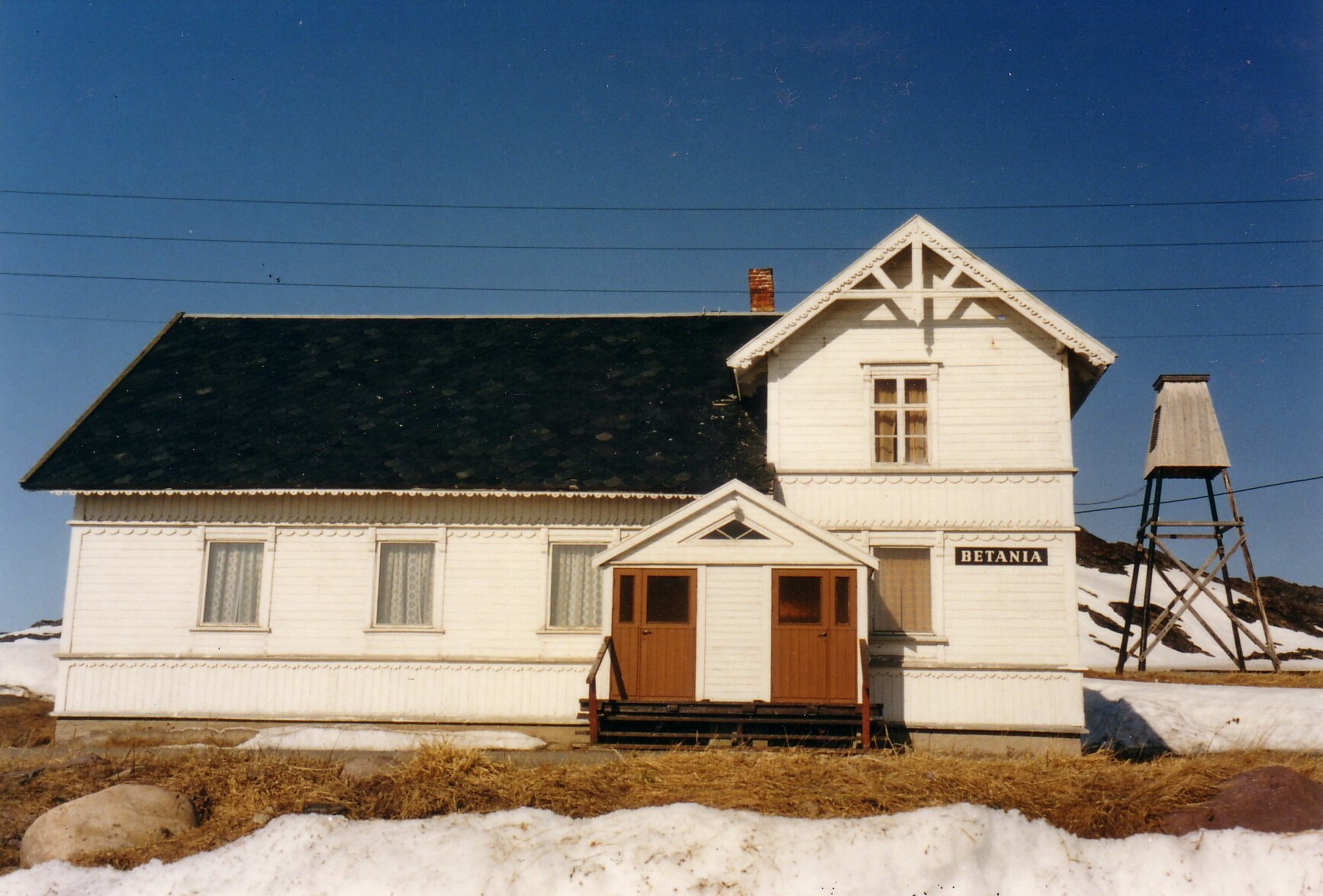
The chapel in Kiberg

=== Witch Burning ===
Two women from Kiberg, Mari Jørgensdatter and Kirsti Sørensdatter, were burned at the stake during the 1621 witch trials in Vardø. The Scottish-born governor of Vardø, John Cunningham (ca. 1575 - 1651), also known as Hans Køning, was present in court during the hearing against Mari Jørgensdatter on 29 January 1621 and at the trial of Kirsti Sørensdatter on 16 and 28 April. When Kirsti Sørensdatter was burned alive, a couple of months after ten other women had been burnt for sorcery, she became the last victim of the great witch trial of 1621.

=== Pomor trade ===
During the days of the Pomor trade, which was ended as a result of changes ushered in by the Russian revolution in 1917, Kiberg was a centre of Russian activity, to such as extent that the village was called "Lille Moskva" (Little Moscow).

=== World War Two ===
During World War II, forty-five men from the village served in the Soviet military forces. Eighteen of these partisans survived the war, and seventeen returned to the village.

On 25 September 1940, a few months after Germany occupied Norway, three fishing boats left Kiberg harbour in dense fog for the Soviet Union with forty-eight passerngers on board, including small children. When they reached Vayda-Guba, they were met by Soviet navy vessels and brought to the navy base in Polyarny, where they were questioned by the NKVD about their motives for coming to the Soviet Union. After a few weeks, they were freed and sent to Murmansk. The men had agreed to enroll in the Northern Fleet or the NKVD, while the women and children were sent on to Shadrinsk to work on a state farm. Others soon followed these refugees. In all, more than 100 people fled occupied Finnmark for the Soviet Union in 1940.

After the Nazis attacked the Soviet Union, some of these refugees returned to Norway to serve as partisans, reporting on German shipping movements.

Most of the partisans were killed by the Germans, especially in 1943, but some survived. (One of those was Aksel Jacobsen Bogdanoff, who has a second claim to fame—in 1953, he and his brother encountered and shot the last polar bear seen in Finnmark, at Lille Ekkerøy.

Because they had been involved with the Soviet Union, the surviving partisans and their helpers were treated as suspicious by the Norwegian surveillance police during the Cold War. In 1992, the Norwegian King apologized to them on behalf of the state.
