= Lille Ekkerøya =

Island in Finnmark, Norway

Lille Ekkerøya (Norwegian); Pikku-Ekrea (Kven); Ižžok (Northern Sami)
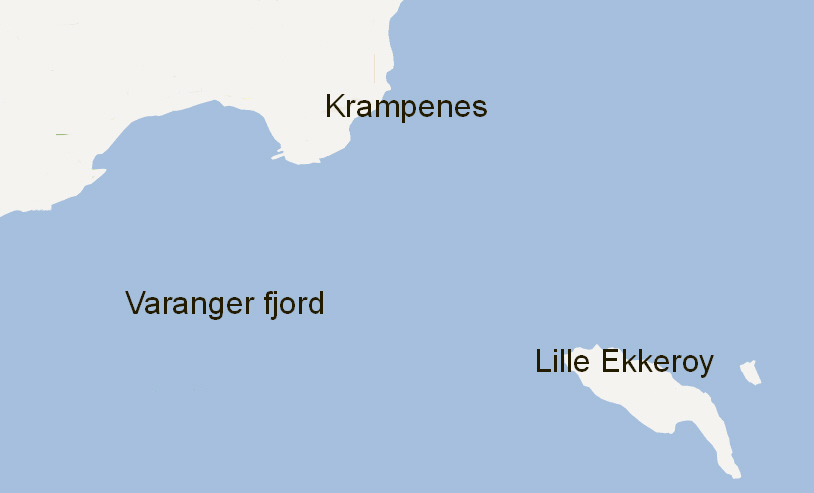
- Location of the island relative to Krampenes on the mainland
- Interactive map of: Lille Ekkerøya (Norwegian); Pikku-Ekrea (Kven); Ižžok (Northern Sami)

Geography
- Location: Finnmark, Norway
- Coordinates: 70.0903°N 30.2406°E
- Area: 0.34 km^{2} (0.13 sq mi)
- Highest elevation: 23 m (75 ft)

Administration
- Norway
- County: Finnmark
- Municipality: Vadsø Municipality

Lille Ekkerøya (Norwegian), Pikku-Ekrea (Kven), or Ižžot (Northern Sami) is an island in Vadsø Municipality in Finnmark county, Norway. The 0.34-square-kilometre (84-acre; 34-hectare) island lies in the Varangerfjorden, about 2 kilometres (1.2 mi) off the coast of the mainland Varanger Peninsula. It is located about 2 kilometres (1.2 mi) southeast of the village of Krampenes and about 5 kilometres (3.1 mi) northeast of the village of Ekkerøy. The town of Vadsø is located about 20 kilometres (12 mi) to the west of the island.

== World War II ==
The lighthouse on the island was a cause of concern to Soviet forces in World War II and, at one stage, the keeper was captured and taken away for questioning by a landing party of Soviet marines.

== Polar bear ==
In 1953, a polar bear was shot on the island. The bear was found by the brothers Aksel Jacobsen Bogdanoff (1922–1971) and Ingvald Bogdanoff (1920–1995) when they were out inspecting their salmon nets in the area. It was believed that the bear had come on an ice-floe from Svalbard.

This is the last time that a polar bear was seen anywhere in Finnmark county.

== Population ==
Although the island is now uninhabited, this was not always the case. In 1567, when there were only eight families in the town of Vadsø and five families in Store Ekkerøy, there were eight families on Lille Ekkerøy.

The eleven children of Signe Bogdanoff (née Dahl, from Tromsø) and Jacob Wilhelm Bogdanoff (which included the brothers Aksel Jacobsen Bogdanoff and Ingvald Bogdanoff mentioned above) were the last generation who lived on Lille Ekkerøy. They were evacuated during World War II, moving to Krampenes, but returned and lived there until about 1953, when they moved back to Krampenes.

== See also ==
- Store Ekkerøy
