= Vardø Airport =

Vardø Airport Vardø lufthavn

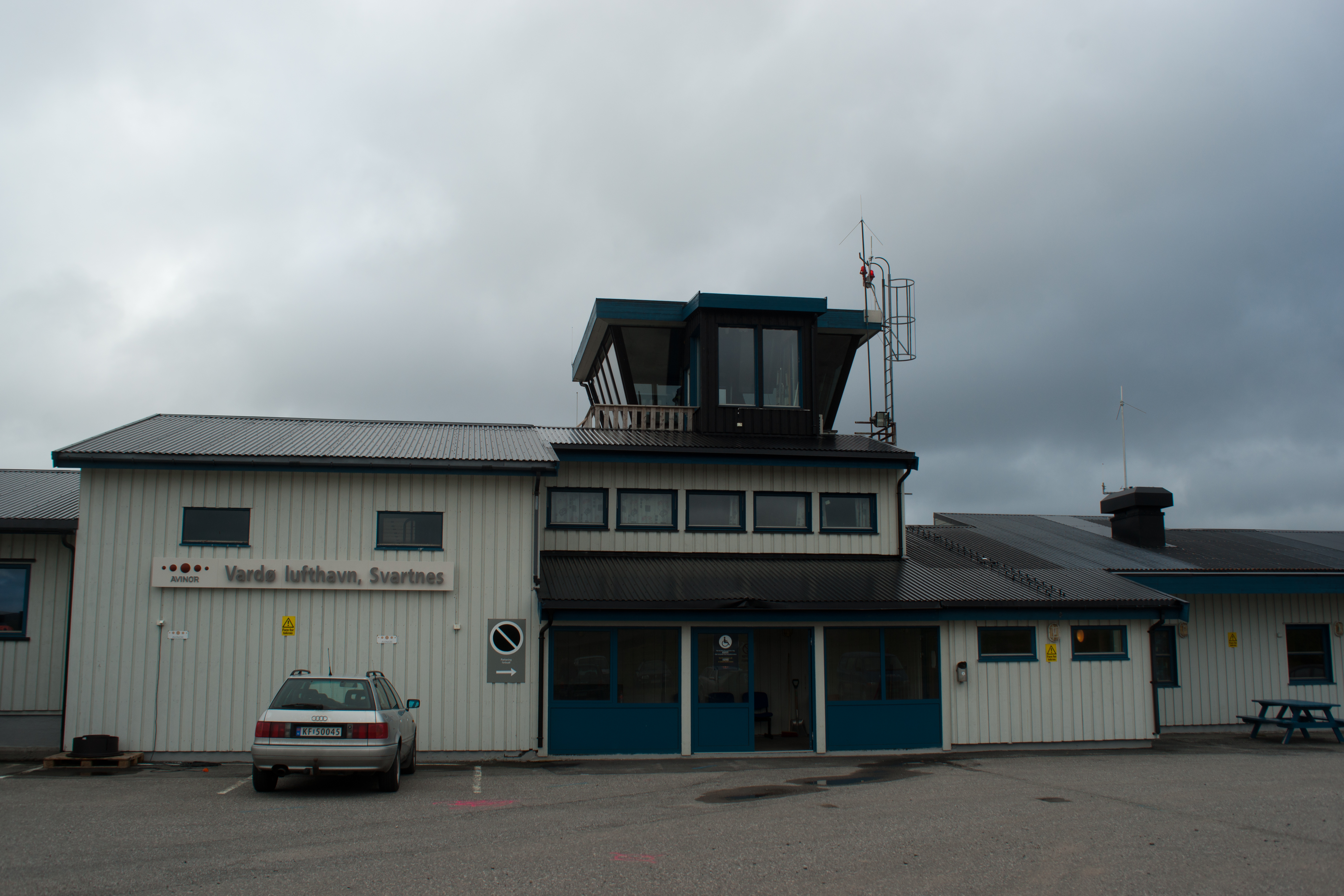
- IATA: VAW; ICAO: ENSS

Summary
- Airport type: Public
- Operator: Avinor
- Serves: Vardø, Norway
- Location: Svartnes, Vardø Municipality
- Elevation AMSL: 13 m / 42 ft
- Coordinates: 70°21′19″N 031°02′42″E
- Website: avinor.no

Map
- Location in Norway

Runways
Direction	Length		Surface
Direction	m	ft	Surface
15/33	1,145	3,757	Asphalt

Statistics (2014)
- Passengers: 13,889
- Aircraft movements: 2,518
- Cargo (tonnes): 0.7

Vardø Airport (Norwegian: Vardø Lufthavn; IATA: VAW, ICAO: ENSS) is a short take-off and landing airport located at Svartnes in Vardø Municipality in Finnmark county, Norway. Owned and operated by the state-owned Avinor, it served 14,664 passengers in 2012. The airport has a 1,145-by-30-meter (3,757 by 98 ft) runway aligned 15–33. It is served by Widerøe who operate Bombardier Dash 8 aircraft to Kirkenes and other communities in Finnmark. The airport is located 4 kilometers (2.5 mi) from Vardøya and the town center of Vardø.

Svartnes was built by the German Luftwaffe 1943, where it served fighter aircraft to protect German convoys. The airport was abandoned in 1944 but reopened by the Norwegian Armed Forces for military passenger flights. Plans to start civilian operates were launched in the 1960s and from 1970 Norving started irregular flights to the airport. An upgrade to the terminal and runway were carried out between 1984 and 1990. Widerøe took over flights in 1991.

== History ==
Svartnes was constructed by the Luftwaffe during the German occupation of Norway during World War II. The background for the establishment was Soviet attacks on supply convoys operating to Kirkenes. During construction, on 12 July 1943, eight Soviet Ilyushin Il-2s attacked Svartnes, but all were shot down. While the war remained in the area Soviet air attacks continued on the air base. The airport was completed in the fall of 1943, it was exclusively used for fighter aircraft detachments of Jagdgeschwader 5. These were used as part of the defense of German ship traffic around Varangerhalvøya. The original wooden runway was 1,000 by 90 meters (3,280 by 300 ft). The Wehrmacht operated a prisoner of war camp at the military base. The air base fell into disuse following the German evacuation in 1944.

The wooden runway was pillaged by locals to accumulate building materials for reconstruction. The Norwegian Armed Forces established itself in Vardø in the mid-1950s. The airport was renovated; a terminal was built consisting of two simple barracks, one used as a passenger terminal and the other as a tower, consisting of a glass addition on the roof. The 1,100-by-80-meter (3,610 by 260 ft) gravel runway received portable runway lights. The Royal Norwegian Air Force served the airport with de Havilland Canada Twin Otter and Shorts Skyvan aircraft to transport military personnel.

The first plans for a civilian airport at Svartnes was launched by Varangfly, later renamed Norving, in 1964. Vardø was mentioned as one of five villages in Finnmark which the airline hoped to open with simple airfields which could serve air taxi and air ambulance flights. Two years later several major airlines proposed a network of short take-off and landing (STOL) airports in Northern Norway, and Vardø was proposed as a possible location. A county committee was established in 1966 to look into the matter. It considered seven locations in Finnmark, including Vardø and recommended in its report that planning continue. Simultaneously the Ministry of Transport and Communications was working on a plan for larger short take-off and landing airports. It decided that such airports will first be built in Helgeland, then Lofoten and Vesterålen and finally in Troms and Finnmark.

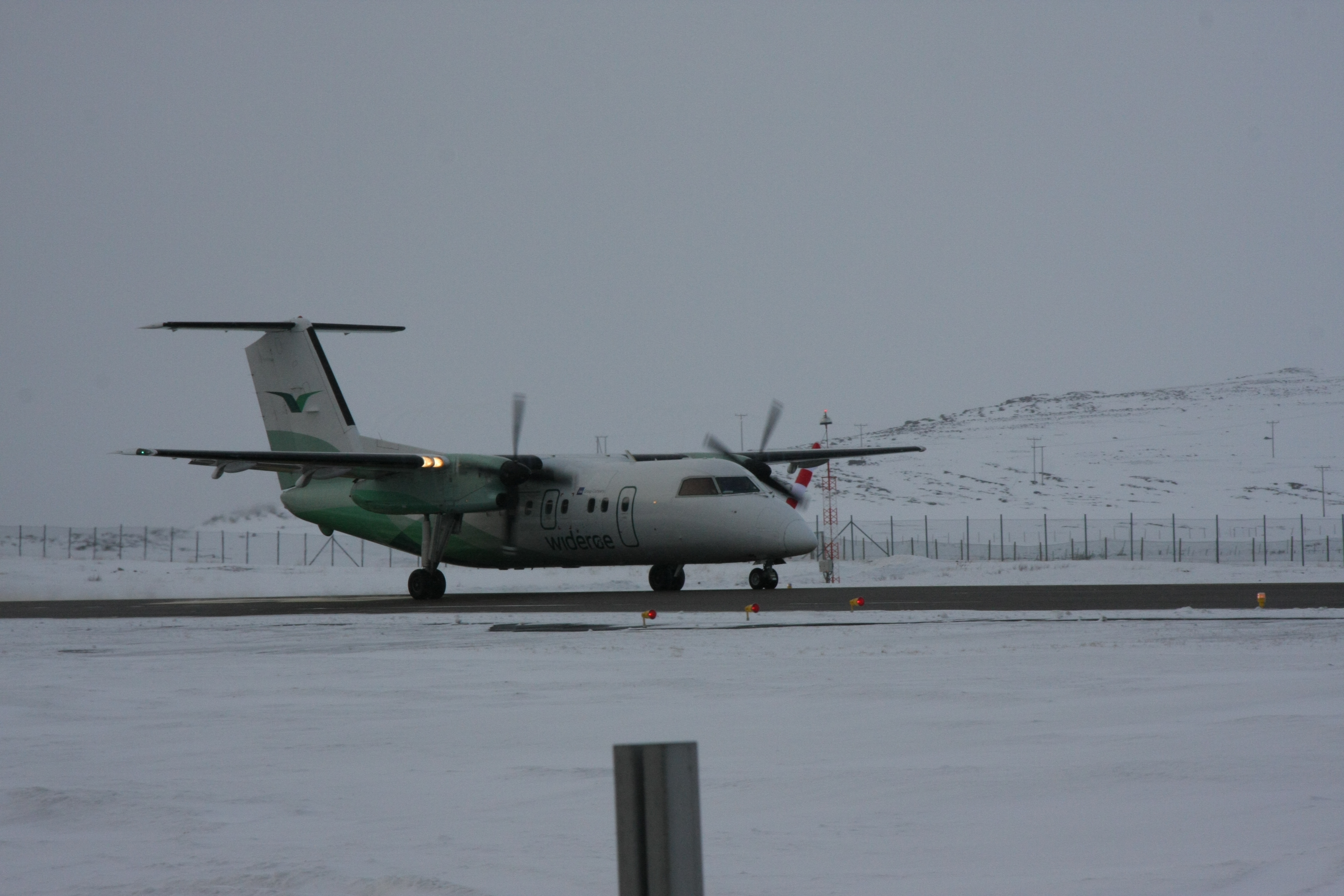
Widerøe Dash 8-100

Norving started operating irregular air taxi flights to Vardø after they took delivery of an eight-seat Britten-Norman Islander in April 1970. In addition, the airline used the air field for air ambulance services. Norving received permission to operate a scheduled taxi route from Vardø to Kirkenes Airport, Høybuktmoen and Båtsfjord Airport from the late 1970s.

Construction of a new terminal and upgrading the airport to regional standard started in 1984. In February 1987 Vardø Municipality received operating permission from the government. The investments cost NOK 11.4 million, of which NOK 10 million was to be financed through a loan and the rest through subsidies from the government and the county. The latter was also responsible for covering the operating deficit. The upgraded airport opened on 6 April 1987. The first two months Norving continued its taxi route service to the airport, but from 1 June a regular concession scheduled service was introduced. Widerøe took over the services in 1991. At first the airport was served using Twin Otters, but from the mid-1990s the Dash 8 was introduced. From 1996, Svartnes and 25 other regional airports were taken over by the state and the Civil Aviation Administration (later renamed Avinor). Widerøe lost the bid to operate the services between 2000 and 2003 to Arctic Air, but resumed services in 2003. Airport security was introduced on 1 January 2005. There has several times been discuss whether to close down the airport, having in mind that Vadsø Airport is 67 km away by road. In 2002 there was political support in Stortinget to close it if the road was upgraded, but neither happened. In 2015 Avinor stated that closing Vardø would give least passenger trouble related to the financial support in the country, but that no decision on it would be made before 2019. Because of lack of available aircraft for purchase, before 2030 all short airports must be extended, closed or be flown with very small planes. Vardø has no room for extension.

== Facilities ==
The airport has a single terminal building which has an integrated control tower. The passenger terminal has a capacity for thirty passengers per hour. The airport is located 4 kilometers (2.5 mi) driving from the town center. Taxis are available at the airport. In 2012 the airport had 13,889 passengers, 2,518 aircraft movements and 0.7 tonnes of cargo handled.

== Airlines and destinations ==
The airport is served by Widerøe with 39-seat Dash 8-100 aircraft connecting the community to Tromsø, Kirkenes and other communities in Finnmark. The routes are operated on public service obligation with the Ministry of Transport and Communications.

Airlines	Destinations
Widerøe	Båtsfjord, Berlevåg, Kirkenes, Vadsø

== Statistics ==
Annual passenger traffic
Year	Passengers	% Change
2025	25,397	▲11.1%
2024	22,860	▼ -21.6%
2023	29,160	▲5.3%
2022	27,683	▲11.3%
2021	24,869	▲43.7%
2020	17,309	▼ -41.8%
2019	29,724	▲2.1%
2018	29,107	▼ -3.3%
2017	30,107	▼ -6.1%
2016	32,063	▲4.1%
2015	30,786	

== Accidents and incidents ==
On 5 March 1978 a Partenavia P.68 LN-MAD operated by Norving Airlines crashed at Falkefjell during approach to Vadsø Airport. The crew of two and a passenger all survived, but the aircraft was written off.
