= Ekkerøya =

Ekkerøya: Ekkerøya (Norwegian); Ihkkok (Northern Sami); Ekrea (Kven)
- Village
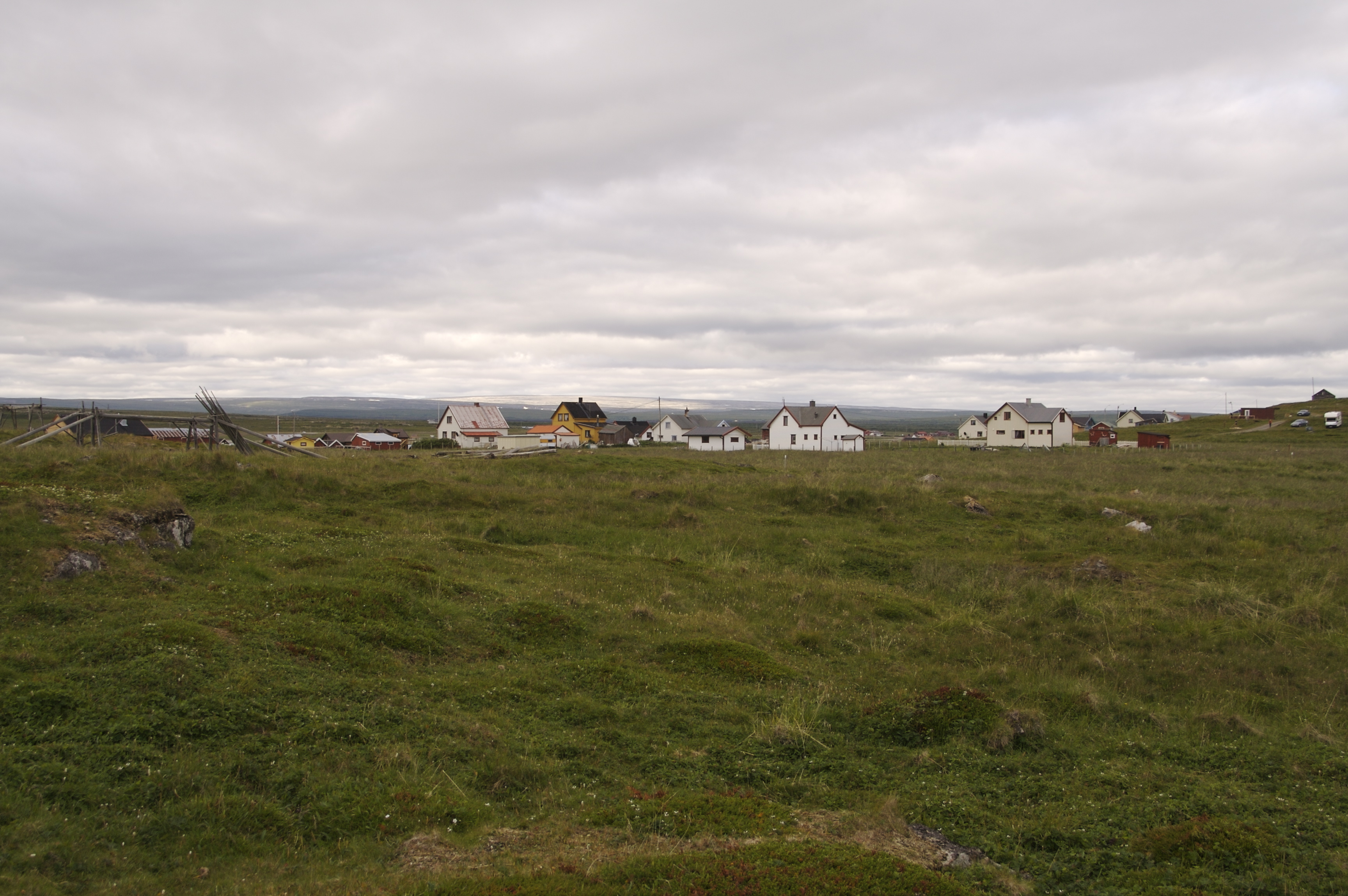
- View of the village
- Interactive map of Ekkerøya
- Location within Finnmark Location within Norway
- Coordinates: 70°04′26″N 30°06′12″E
- Country: Norway
- Region: Northern Norway
- County: Finnmark
- District: Øst-Finnmark
- Municipality: Vadsø Municipality
- Elevation: 18 m (59 ft)
- Time zone: UTC+01:00 (CET)
  - Summer (DST): UTC+02:00 (CEST)
- Post Code: 9800 Vadsø

Ekkerøya (Norwegian) (pronounced [/ˈɛkərøɪ/]), Ihkkot (Northern Sami), or Ekrea (Kven) is one of the oldest fishing villages on the Varangerfjorden in Finnmark county, Norway. It is located in Vadsø Municipality about 15 kilometres (9.3 mi) east of the town of Vadsø which is the administrative centre of the municipality and the county. The village of Valen lies just north of Ekkerøy. The village is known as Ekkerøya in Norwegian, but it can also be called Ekkerøy. The (former) island on which it is located is known as Store Ekkerøya (meaning "big Ekkerøya", as opposed to the smaller, nearby island called Lille Ekkerøya, meaning "little Ekkerøya").

Historically, the population was Norwegian or Kven, rather than Sami, and the economy was based on fishing and farming. There are about forty people living in the village today and tourism forms part of the economy.

== Geography ==
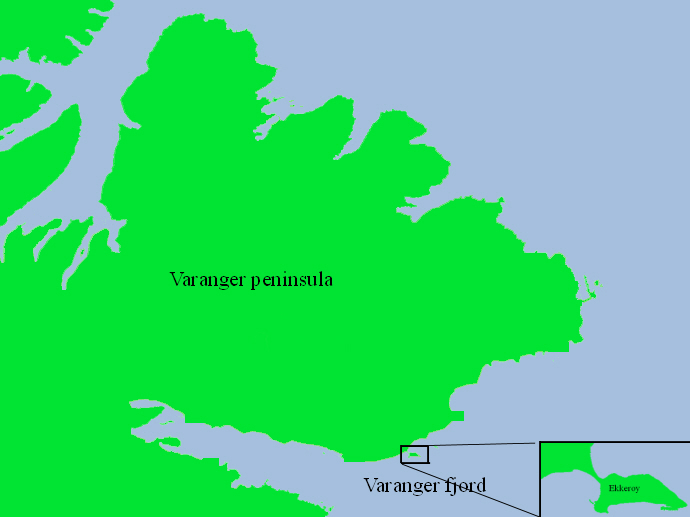
Location of Ekkerøy

As the ending "øy" in the name indicates, the place was originally an island; however, it is now joined to the Varanger peninsula by a narrow isthmus of land. At the mainland end of the isthmus the small hamlet of Valen is located.

The headland on the northern tip of Ekkerøy is called Varnes and its eastern tip is called Skagodden. The bay on the northeastern side of the neck which joins Ekkerøy to the mainland is called Yttersida and that on the southwestern side is called Innersida.

== World War II ==
Ekkerøy is one of the few places in Finnmark where pre-World War II buildings can be seen. When the German army retreated from the Litsa front and Kirkenes in late 1944, they burned most buildings in the county. However, buildings on the north side of the Varangerfjorden survived because the Russians advanced so quickly that the German troops in this area fled west to get across the Tana river before they were cut off and, therefore, did not have enough time to obey the order to destroy all buildings.

== Museum ==
Most of the old Kjeldsen fish plant, including a pier, cod-liver oil cooker, and country store, has been converted into a museum which is run by the Varanger Museum in Vadsø and is open in the summer time. In 2012, the museum included an exhibition called "Murman, the Coast of Hope", about migration in the 1860s from Norway and Finland to the Murman Coast which extends eastward from the current Norwegian-Russian border. After Ekkerøy, the exhibition was to move to Vardø, Kirkenes, Murmansk, Arkhangelsk, and places in Finland.

On the pier, one building (which previously belonged to the Kjeldsen fish plant) has been converted to a restaurant, called Havhesten (English: Seahorse).

== Notable residents ==
- Kjellfrid Irene (née Andreassen), the mother of the actress Renée Zellweger, is from Ekkerøy

== See also ==
- Lille Ekkerøya, a neighboring island
