= Franz Schall =

German World War II fighter pilot

- Schall as a Leutnant
- Born: 1 June 1918; Graz, Austria-Hungary
- Died: 10 April 1945 (aged 26); Parchim, Nazi Germany
- Cause of death: Killed in action
- Military career
- Allegiance: Nazi Germany
- Branch: Luftwaffe
- Rank: Hauptmann (captain)
- Units: JG 52, Kommando Nowotny, JG 7
- Conflicts: See battles World War II: Eastern Front; Battle of Kursk; Western Front; Defense of the Reich
- Awards: Knight's Cross of the Iron Cross

Franz Schall (1 June 1918 – 10 April 1945) was a German military aviator who served in the Luftwaffe during World War II. As a fighter ace, he flew approximately 550 combat missions and claimed 137 aerial victories—that is, 137 aerial combat encounters resulting in the destruction of the enemy aircraft. He was also a recipient of the Knight's Cross of the Iron Cross, the highest award in the military and paramilitary forces of Nazi Germany during World War II.

He was killed on 10 April 1945, when his aircraft rolled into a bomb crater and exploded during an attempted emergency landing at Parchim.

== Early life and career ==
Schall was born on 1 June 1918 in Graz in Austria-Hungary. He began his military service with the anti-aircraft artillery before in September 1941 he was trained as a fighter pilot. (Note: Flight training in the Luftwaffe progressed through the levels A1, A2 and B1, B2, referred to as A/B flight training. A training included theoretical and practical training in aerobatics, navigation, long-distance flights and dead-stick landings. The B courses included high-altitude flights, instrument flights, night landings and training to handle the aircraft in difficult situations.) In December 1942, Schall was transferred to Ergänzungs-Jagdgruppe Ost (EJGr Ost—Supplementary Fighter Group, East) which was based at Saint-Jean-d'Angély in France. EJGr Ost main purpose was to provide specialized training for new fighter pilots destined for the Eastern Front. Training was provided by experienced Eastern Front veterans, who were rotated in and out of this unit. Schall was assigned to group of six trainee pilots which included Wilhelm Batz and Walter Wolfrum. Their fighter pilot instructor was Oberfeldwebel Karl Steffen, a combat veteran credited with 44 aerial victories.

Holding the rank of Leutnant (second lieutenant), Schall was posted to the 3. Staffel (3rd squadron) of Jagdgeschwader 52 (JG 52—52nd Fighter Wing) on 18 February 1943. At the time, this Staffel was commanded by Oberleutnant Rudolf Miethig and was part of I. Gruppe (1st group) of JG 52 headed by Hauptmann Helmut Bennemann.

== World War II ==
World War II in Europe had begun on Friday 1 September 1939 when German forces invaded Poland. Germany had launched Operation Barbarossa, the invasion of the Soviet Union on 22 June 1941. In February 1943, I. Gruppe was based at Poltava on the Eastern Front and was subordinated to Luftwaffenkommando Don which supported the fighting in the Third Battle of Kharkov. Schall claimed his first aerial victory on 6 May when he shot down a Lavochkin La-5 fighter near Belgorod.

I./JG 52 insignia

In preparation for Operation Citadel, I. Gruppe was moved to Bessonovka, a makeshift airfield located approximately 20 kilometers (12 miles) on 4 July. On 13 July during the Battle of Kursk, Schall, accompanied by his wingman Oberfeldwebel Franz Woidich, claimed an Ilyushin Il-2 ground attack aircraft shot down. On 14 July, he was awarded the Iron Cross 2nd Class (Eisernes Kreuz zweiter Klasse) and the Iron Cross 1st Class (Eisernes Kreuz erster Klasse) on 24 August. On 11 November 1943, Schall was shot down and wounded by anti-aircraft artillery in his Messerschmitt Bf 109 G-6 (Werknummer 410131—factory number) resulting in a forced landing 3 kilometers (1.9 miles) south of Kerch. In December 1943, Schall was temporarily put in command of 3. Staffel of JG 52. He replaced Leutnant Karl-Heinz Plücker who was transferred.

Schall was awarded the German Cross in Gold (Deutsches Kreuz in Gold) on 20 March 1944. On 5 April, I. Gruppe moved to an airfield at Leipzig, present-day Serpneve. Here Schall claimed his 50th aierial victory on 17 May. On 11 May, then Oberleutnant Franz Woidich succeeded Schall as commander of 3. Staffel. On 10 June 1944, I. Gruppe was ordered to an airfield named Poloniczna, a makeshift airfield located approximately 50 kilometers (31 miles) northeast of Lemberg, now Lviv. Seven days later, they were moved to Serpneve. On 22 June, Soviet forces launched Operation Bagration, attacking Army Group Centre in Byelorussia, with the objective of encircling and destroying its main component armies. On 24 June, the Gruppe transferred to Galați and again to Peloniczna. The Gruppe reached Grabowiec in eastern Poland on 27 July and Kraków on 1 August. On 12 August they were again relocated and moved to Mzurowa. The day before, Schall was officially appointed Staffelkapitän (Squadron leader) of 3. Staffel after Woidich was transferred.

Fighting across Poland, it led to his most prolific period in the war with a number of multiple victories in a day: three on 12 August (74–76), three more on the 24th (79–81). On 26 August, Schall became a "double ace-in-a-day" for the first time, claiming eleven aerial victories which included six Il-2 ground-attack aircraft. On 31 August, he surpassed this figure, claiming thirteen aerial victories, including his 100th claim, which took his total to 109 victories. He was the 81st Luftwaffe pilot to achieve the century mark. In September 1944, Schall left JG 52 and transferred to a jet fighter unit. Command of 3. Staffel was transferred to Leutnant Leonhard Färber on 25 September.

=== Flying the Messerschmitt Me 262 ===
On 25 September 1944, Schall was posted to a specialist unit dubbed Kommando Nowotny, named after Walter Nowotny, for testing and establishing tactics for the newly developed Messerschmitt Me 262 jet fighter. (Note: For a list of Luftwaffe Jet aces see List of German World War II jet aces) General der Jagdflieger (General of the Fighter Force) Adolf Galland had hoped that the Me 262 would compensate for the United States Army Air Forces (USAAF) numerical superiority. There, following the death of Hauptmann Alfred Teumer on 4 October, Schall was appointed Staffelkapitän of 2. Staffel on 16 October. On 7 October, Schall and Feldwebel Helmut Lennartz were scrambled at 13:45 from Hesepe airfield to intercept a heavy bomber formation. In this encounter, both Schall and Lennartz each claimed a USAAF Consolidated B-24 Liberator bomber shot down, the first aerial victories of Kommando Nowotny. Schall claimed a North American P-51 Mustang fighter destroyed on 28 October and a Republic P-47 Thunderbolt fighter on 6 November. Schall was awarded the Knight's Cross of the Iron Cross (Ritterkreuz des Eisernen Kreuzes) on 10 October 1944 for 117 aerial victories claimed.

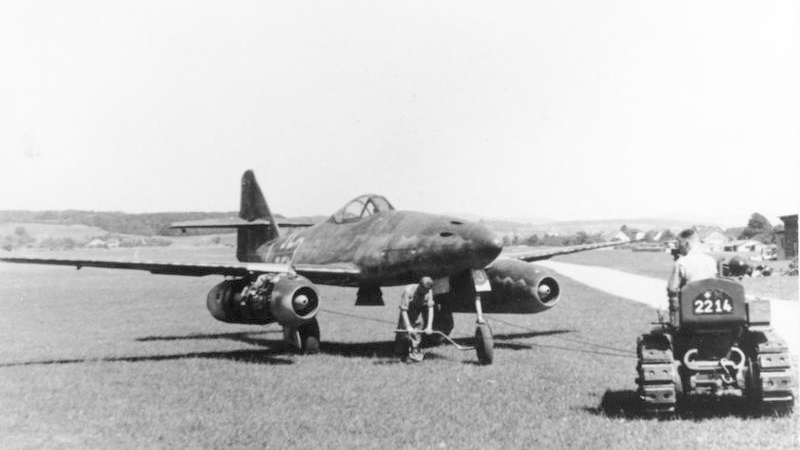
Me 262 A, circa 1944

Generals Alfred Keller and Galland had scheduled an inspection of Kommando Nowotny for the afternoon of 7 November 1944. Galland had already visited Kommando Nowotny several times and was deeply concerned over the high attrition rate and meager success achieved by the Me 262. After inspecting the two airfields at Achmer and Hesepe, he stayed in the Penterknapp barracks discussing the problems of the past few weeks. Several pilots openly expressed their doubts as to the readiness of the Me 262 for combat operations. When the Generals arrived again at Nowotny's command post the next morning a large bomber formation was reported. Two Rotten of Me 262 were prepared for take-off, Erich Büttner and Schall at Hesepe, and Nowotny and Günther Wegmann at Achmer. At first only Schall and Wegmann managed to take off because Büttner had a punctured tire during taxiing and Nowotny's turbines initially refused to start. Schall and Wegmann both made contact with the Americans, claiming a P-51 and P-47 respectively. By the time the Americans returned from their bomb run, Nowotny, his aircraft now serviceable, and Schall took off alone and made contact with the bomber force at an altitude of 10,000 meters (33,000 feet). Schall shot down two P-51s before suffering engine failure. Attempting to glide his aircraft to Hesepe, Schall was shot down by Lieutenant James W. Kenney of the 357th Fighter Group. While Schall managed to bail out safely, Nowotny was killed in action.

Following Nowotny's death, the pilots of Kommando Nowotny were moved to Lechfeld where they were joined by 20–25 pilots from III. Gruppe of Ergänzungs-Jagdgeschwader 2, also known as Erprobungskommando Lechfeld, a replacement training unit which had also trained on the Me 262. On 19 November, Kommando Nowotny became the III. Gruppe of Jagdgeschwader 7 (JG 7 - 7th Fighter Wing), the world's first operational jet fighter wing, and was moved to Brandenburg-Briest. JG 7 had been formed in August 1944 and placed under the command of Oberst Johannes Steinhoff. At the time of its creation, III./JG 7 was commanded by Major Erich Hohagen and command of 10. Staffel was handed to Schall.

On 18 March 1945, the USAAF Eighth Air Force attacked Berlin with 1,329 bombers, escorted by 733 fighter aircraft. A number of Me 262s intercepted the bomber formation and its escorts in vicinity of Nauen-Rathenow-Brandenburg-Potsdam. At approximately 11:15, Schall claimed a P-51 shot down. The next day, 374 Boeing B-17 Flying Fortress bombers from the 3d Air Division attacked Carl Zeiss AG, a manufacturer of optical systems, in Jena, and the motor vehicle factories at Zwickau and Plauen. In defense of this attack, Schall claimed a B-17 shot down north of Chemnitz. On 21 March 1945, the USAAF Eighth Air Force attacked various Luftwaffe airfields in Germany with approximately 1,300 heavy bombers, escorted by 750 fighter aircraft. That day, Schall claimed another aerial victory over a P-51. The next, the Eighth Air Force again targeted various military installations and airfields in Germany. Yet again Schall claimed a P-51 shot down, that day in the Cottbus-Bautzen-Dresden area. On 24 March, 1,714 bombers, escorted by approximately 1,300 fighter aircraft, targeted 18 Luftwaffe airfields. Schall led 10. Staffel at about 12:00 from Parchim Airfield and engaged the bombers south of Berlin. Approximately 15 Me 262s, the majority of them armed with R4M air-to-air rockets, claimed a number of bombers destroyed, including a B-17 by Schall. On 31 March 1945, the Royal Air Force (RAF) Bomber Command targeted Wilhelmshaven, Bremen and Hamburg. The attack force from No. 219, No. 429, No. 431, No. 434, No. 408, No. 415 and No. 425 Squadron had made their target approach by night. In morning hours, the British and Canadians were intercepted by 20 Me 262s from I. Gruppe and seven Me 262s from III. Gruppe who claimed 19 four-engined bombers, two fighters and probable destruction of another bomber. Schall claimed two victories in this engagement.

On 4 April, Schall claimed a P-51 shot down. That day, RAF Bomber Command had targeted Nordhausen with 243 Avro Lancaster bombers while the USAAF Eighth Air Force sent 950 B-17s and B-24s to Luftwaffe airfields at Kaltenkirchen, Parchim, Perleberg, Wesendorf, Faßberg, Hoya, Dedelstorf and Eggebek, as well as the U-boat yards at Finkenwerder and shipyards at Kiel. This bomber force was protected by 800 escort fighters. On 9 April, the RAF targeted the German ships Admiral Scheer, Admiral Hipper and Emden moored at Kiel and other targets in northern Germany. That afternoon, Schall claimed a Lancaster shot down. On 10 April 1945, Schall claimed a P-51 shot down. He was then killed when his aircraft rolled into a bomb crater, flipped, and exploded during an attempted emergency landing at Parchim Airfield. That day, the Luftwaffe lost a number of Me 262 pilots, including Oberleutnant Walther Wever. The Americans dubbed this day the "great jet massacre". Schall had been nominated for the Knight's Cross of the Iron Cross with Oak Leaves (Ritterkreuz des Eisernen Kreuzes mit Eichenlaub) which was not approved before the war ended.

== Summary of career ==
=== Aerial victory claims ===
According to US historian David T. Zabecki, Schall was credited with 133 aerial victories. Forsyth also lists Schall with 133 aerial victories claimed in 530 combat missions. This figure includes 17 claims flying the Me 262 jet fighter, including six four-engined heavy bombers and eleven P-51 fighters. Spick however lists him with 137 aerial victories claimed in approximately 550 combat missions, and a mission-to-claim ratio of 4.01. Mathews and Foreman, authors of Luftwaffe Aces — Biographies and Victory Claims, researched the German Federal Archives and found records for 133 aerial victory claims, plus four further unconfirmed claims. This figure of confirmed claims includes 117 aerial victories on the Eastern Front and 16 on the Western Front flying the Me 262 jet fighter, including five four-engined bombers.

Victory claims were logged to a map-reference (PQ = Planquadrat), for example "PQ 35 Ost 61184". The Luftwaffe grid map (Jägermeldenetz) covered all of Europe, western Russia and North Africa and was composed of rectangles measuring 15 minutes of latitude by 30 minutes of longitude, an area of about 360 square miles (930 km^{2}). These sectors were then subdivided into 36 smaller units to give a location area 3 km × 4 km (1.9 mi × 2.5 mi) in size.

Chronicle of aerial victories
This and the ♠ (Ace of spades) indicates those aerial victories which made Schall an "ace-in-a-day", a term which designates a fighter pilot who has shot down five or more airplanes in a single day. This and the – (dash) indicates unconfirmed aerial victory claims for which Schall did not receive credit. This and the ? (question mark) indicates information discrepancies listed by Prien, Stemmer, Rodeike, Balke, Bock, Mathews and Foreman.
Claim	Date	Time	Type	Location	Claim	Date	Time	Type	Location
– 3. Staffel of Jagdgeschwader 52 – Eastern Front — 4 February – 31 December 1943
1	6 May 1943	13:14	La-5	PQ 35 Ost 61184, vicinity of Belgorod; 20 km (12 mi) north-northeast of Belgorod	13	27 September 1943	14:35	Il-2 m.H. (Note: The "m.H." refers to an Ilyushin Il-2 with rear gunner (mit Heckschütze).)	PQ 34 Ost 66865 vicinity of Wennlowka
—	13 May 1943	04:15	La-5		14	27 September 1943	14:43	Il-2 m.H.	PQ 34 Ost 76772 vicinity of Blagoweschtschenskaja
2	30 May 1943	16:12	La-5	PQ 34 Ost 75232 north of Krymsk	15	20 October 1943	12:07	Il-2	PQ 34 Ost 58143 northwest of Zaporizhia
3	11 June 1943	10:25	Il-2	PQ 34 Ost 76823 vicinity of Kalabatka	16	21 October 1943	12:05	Il-2 m.H.? (Note: According to Mathews and Foreman claimed as a Yakovlev Yak-1.)	PQ 34 Ost 58738
4	5 July 1943	18:45	Il-2	PQ 35 Ost 61652, north of Pukroska; 15 km (9.3 mi) northwest of Vovchansk	17	22 October 1943	13:15	Yak-7? (Note: According to Mathews and Foreman claimed as a Bell P-39 Airacobra.)	PQ 34 Ost 39652; 15 km (9.3 mi) southeast of Pjatichatki
5	12 July 1943	14:47	Il-2	PQ 35 Ost 61132; 10 km (6.2 mi) west of Prokhorovka	18	23 October 1943	09:07	P-39? (Note: According to Mathews and Foreman claimed as an Ilyushin Il-2.)	PQ 34 Ost 58561 vicinity of Kalinowka
6	13 July 1943	08:57	Il-2 m.H.	PQ 35 Ost 61293; 25 km (16 mi) southeast of Prokhorovka	19	24 October 1943	10:32	Il-2 m.H.	PQ 34 Ost 58172; 10 km (6.2 mi) south of Melitopol
7	15 July 1943	13:10	Il-2 m.H.	PQ 35 Ost 62883, 8 km (5.0 mi) northeast of Prokhorovka; 20 km (12 mi) northeast of Prokhorovka	20	24 October 1943	13:50	Il-2 m.H.? (Note: According to Mathews and Foreman claimed as a Lavochkin La-5.)	PQ 34 Ost 57171; 10 km (6.2 mi) south of Melitopol
8	18 July 1943	06:50	Il-2 m.H.	PQ 34 Ost 88431 vicinity of Marienheim (Perekrestovo)	21	28 October 1943	14:15	La-5? (Note: According to Mathews and Foreman claimed as a Polikarpov Po-2, referred to as U-2.)	PQ 34 Ost 48512; 25 km (16 mi) west-southwest of Nikopol
9	26 July 1943	18:12	Il-2	PQ 34 Ost 88267, south of Julizwechino vicinity of Jalisawehino	22	7 November 1943	15:05	U-2	PQ 34 Ost 47771 vicinity of Gromovka
10	1 August 1943	10:38	Il-2 m.H.	PQ 34 Ost 88283; 1 km (0.62 mi) south of Jalisawehino	23	7 November 1943	15:06	U-2	PQ 34 Ost 47771 vicinity of Gromovka
—	4 August 1943	15:30	Il-2?		24	7 November 1943	15:07	U-2	PQ 34 Ost 47771 vicinity of Gromovka
11	7 August 1943	15:55? (Note: According to Mathews and Foreman claimed as a Lavochkin-Gorbunov-Gudkov LaGG-3 at 17:55.)	La-5?	PQ 35 Ost 61595, north of Leskij; 30 km (19 mi) south-southwest of Belgorod	25	9 November 1943	14:25	U-2	PQ 34 Ost 47771 vicinity of Gromovka
12	25 September 1943	08:03	LaGG-3?	PQ 34 Ost 76533 southwest of Kurtschanskaja	26	9 November 1943	14:25	U-2? (Note: According to Mathews and Foreman claimed as a Yakovlev Yak-9.)	PQ 34 Ost 47771 vicinity of Gromovka
– 3. Staffel of Jagdgeschwader 52 – Eastern Front — 1 January – 31 December 1944
27	7 January 1944	14:16	Yak-9?	PQ 34 Ost 29392; 10 km (6.2 mi) east of Kropyvnytskyi	72	16 July 1944	15:36	Yak-9	PQ 25 Ost 41682; 30 km (19 mi) northwest of Brody
28	9 January 1944	14:05	P-39	PQ 34 Ost 29382; 10 km (6.2 mi) west of Alekandrovka	73	16 July 1944	15:40	Yak-9? (Note: According to Mathews and Foreman claimed as a Yakovlev Yak-11.)	PQ 25 Ost 41688; 30 km (19 mi) northwest of Brody
29	12 January 1944	11:06	P-39? (Note: According to Mathews and Foreman claimed as a Yakovlev Yak-9.)	PQ 34 Ost 29492; 25 km (16 mi) west of Kropyvnytskyi	74	12 August 1944	14:10	Yak-11?	PQ 25 Ost 11379; 30 km (19 mi) northwest of Mielec
30	16 January 1944	09:34	Yak-9?	PQ 34 Ost 19462; 25 km (16 mi) west-northwest of Kropyvnytskyi	75	12 August 1944	16:57	La-5?	PQ 25 Ost 11358; 20 km (12 mi) south-southwest of Opatów
31	16 January 1944	11:51	P-39	PQ 34 Ost 29371; 15 km (9.3 mi) west of Kropyvnytskyi	76	12 August 1944	17:02	Il-2 m.H.	PQ 25 Ost 11388; 25 km (16 mi) north-northwest of Mielec
32	16 January 1944	11:55	P-39? (Note: According to Mathews and Foreman claimed as a Lavochkin La-5.)	PQ 34 Ost 29381 vicinity of Kropyvnytskyi	77	22 August 1944	18:45	Il-2 m.H.	PQ 25 Ost 11415; 15 km (9.3 mi) west of Sandomierz
33	16 January 1944	12:03? (Note: According to Mathews and Foreman claimed as a Bell P-39 Airacobra at 12:05.)	La-5?	PQ 34 Ost 29523 vicinity of Alekandrovka	78	22 August 1944	18:50	Il-2 m.H.?	PQ 25 Ost 11335; 15 km (9.3 mi) south of Opatów
34	17 January 1944	11:52	P-39	PQ 34 Ost 29383 vicinity of Kropyvnytskyi	79	24 August 1944	11:12	Yak-9?	PQ 25 Ost 11418; 15 km (9.3 mi) west of Sandomierz
35	26 January 1944	07:52	P-39? (Note: According to Mathews and Foreman claimed as an Ilyushin Il-2.)	PQ 34 Ost 66641 east of Bulganak	80	24 August 1944	14:25	Il-2 m.H.	PQ 25 Ost 11755; 20 km (12 mi) south-southwest of Mielec
36	28 January 1944	15:00	Il-2 m.H.?	PQ 34 Ost 66641 east of Bulganak	81	24 August 1944	14:27	Il-2 m.H.	PQ 25 Ost 11764; 15 km (9.3 mi) south of Mielec
37	22 February 1944	11:35	U-2	PQ 34 Ost 38664; 30 km (19 mi) southeast of Apostolove	82	25 August 1944	09:12	Il-2 m.H.? (Note: According to Mathews and Foreman claimed as an Petlyakov Pe-2.)	PQ 25 Ost 11334; 15 km (9.3 mi) south of Opatów
38	24 February 1944	08:35	U-2? (Note: According to Mathews and Foreman claimed as an Polikarpov R-5.)	PQ 34 Ost 38564; 20 km (12 mi) east of Apostolove	83♠	26 August 1944	11:08	Pe-2	PQ 25 Ost 11292; 20 km (12 mi) northeast of Sandomierz
39	28 March 1944	14:45	R-5?	PQ 24 Ost 98174; 40 km (25 mi) west-southwest of Balta	84♠	26 August 1944	11:12	Pe-2?	PQ 25 Ost 11323; 15 km (9.3 mi) south-southwest of Opatów
40	19 April 1944	13:48	P-39? (Note: According to Mathews and Foreman claimed as an Douglas A-20 Havoc, also known as "Boston".)	PQ 24 Ost 78674; 8 km (5.0 mi) north of Iași	85♠	26 August 1944	15:07	P-39	PQ 25 Ost 11189; 10 km (6.2 mi) west of Opatów
41	24 April 1944	18:00	Boston?	PQ 24 Ost 97343; 30 km (19 mi) north of Leipzig	86♠	26 August 1944	15:15	P-39	PQ 25 Ost 11331; 15 km (9.3 mi) south of Opatów
42	24 April 1944	18:20	Il-2 m.H.	PQ 24 Ost 87634; 20 km (12 mi) north-northwest of Leipzig	87♠	26 August 1944	17:15	Il-2	PQ 25 Ost 11324; 15 km (9.3 mi) south-southwest of Opatów
43	24 April 1944	18:26	Il-2 m.H.?	PQ 24 Ost 87632; 20 km (12 mi) north-northwest of Leipzig	88♠	26 August 1944	17:17	Il-2?	PQ 25 Ost 11357; 20 km (12 mi) south-southwest of Opatów
44	28 April 1944	11:00	P-39	PQ 24 Ost 78674; 8 km (5.0 mi) north of Iași	89♠	26 August 1944	17:18	P-39?	PQ 25 Ost 11379; 30 km (19 mi) northwest of Mielec
45	2 May 1944	10:35	P-39	PQ 24 Ost 68682; 15 km (9.3 mi) north of Târgu Frumos	90♠	26 August 1944	18:50	Il-2	PQ 25 Ost 11183; 10 km (6.2 mi) west of Opatów
46	2 May 1944	15:13	P-39	PQ 24 Ost 78741; 20 km (12 mi) north-northeast of Roman	91♠	26 August 1944	18:51	Il-2	PQ 25 Ost 11186; 10 km (6.2 mi) west of Opatów
47	2 May 1944	17:30	Il-2 m.H.?	PQ 24 Ost 68833, southwest of Târgu Frumos north of Târgu Frumos	92♠	26 August 1944	18:52	Il-2 m.H.	PQ 25 Ost 11189; 10 km (6.2 mi) west of Opatów
48	15 May 1944	18:15	Il-2 m.H.?	PQ 24 Ost 97131; 25 km (16 mi) west-northwest of Tiraspol	93♠	26 August 1944	18:54	Il-2 m.H.	PQ 25 Ost 11185; 10 km (6.2 mi) west of Opatów
49	15 May 1944	18:20	La-5?	PQ 24 Ost 97132; 25 km (16 mi) south-southeast of Grigoriopol	94	28 August 1944	12:30	Il-2 m.H.	PQ 25 Ost 11322; 15 km (9.3 mi) south-southwest of Opatów
50	17 May 1944	18:25	Il-2 m.H.?	PQ 24 Ost 97233; 15 km (9.3 mi) south of Grigoriopol	95	28 August 1944	12:31	Il-2 m.H.	PQ 25 Ost 11327; 15 km (9.3 mi) south-southwest of Opatów
51	30 May 1944	04:30	Il-2 m.H.?	PQ 24 Ost 78675; 15 km (9.3 mi) north of Iași	96	28 August 1944	12:32	Il-2 m.H.	PQ 25 Ost 11185; 10 km (6.2 mi) west of Opatów
52	30 May 1944	16:00	Il-2 m.H.?	PQ 24 Ost 78614; 15 km (9.3 mi) southeast of Țuțora	97♠	31 August 1944	12:54	Il-2 m.H.?	PQ 25 Ost 11185; 10 km (6.2 mi) west of Opatów
53	30 May 1944	16:05	La-5?	PQ 24 Ost 78684; 15 km (9.3 mi) north of Iași	98♠	31 August 1944	14:10	P-39?	PQ 25 Ost 11183; 10 km (6.2 mi) west of Opatów
54	31 May 1944	06:05	Il-2 m.H.	PQ 24 Ost 78685; 15 km (9.3 mi) southeast of Țuțora	99♠	31 August 1944	14:11	Il-2 m.H.	PQ 25 Ost 11185; 10 km (6.2 mi) west of Opatów
55	31 May 1944	11:36	Il-2 m.H.?	PQ 24 Ost 78821; 10 km (6.2 mi) south of Iași	100♠	31 August 1944	14:12	Il-2 m.H.	PQ 25 Ost 11189; 10 km (6.2 mi) west of Opatów
56	1 June 1944	12:35	Yak-9	PQ 24 Ost 78679; 30 km (19 mi) northeast of Silistra	101♠	31 August 1944	14:20	Il-2 m.H.	PQ 25 Ost 11177; 20 km (12 mi) west of Opatów
57	3 June 1944	11:50	Yak-9?	PQ 24 Ost 78674, north of Iași; 8 km (5.0 mi) north of Iași	102♠	31 August 1944	16:02	Il-2 m.H.	PQ 25 Ost 11185; 10 km (6.2 mi) west of Opatów
58	3 June 1944	12:05	Il-2 m.H.	PQ 24 Ost 78592	103♠	31 August 1944	16:03	Il-2 m.H.	PQ 25 Ost 11322; 15 km (9.3 mi) south-southwest of Opatów
59	4 June 1944	16:14	Il-2 m.H.?	PQ 24 Ost 78231	104♠	31 August 1944	16:04	Il-2 m.H.	PQ 25 Ost 11327; 15 km (9.3 mi) south-southwest of Opatów
60	4 June 1944	16:22	P-39?	PQ 24 Ost 78231; 15 km (9.3 mi) northwest of Iași	105♠	31 August 1944	16:08? (Note: According to Mathews and Foreman claimed at 16:09.)	Il-2 m.H.	PQ 25 Ost 11353; 20 km (12 mi) south-southwest of Opatów
61	6 June 1944	09:05? (Note: According to Mathews and Foreman claimed as a Bell P-39 Airacobra at 09:00.)	Yak-9?	PQ 24 Ost 78649; 10 km (6.2 mi) south of Țuțora	106♠	31 August 1944	17:50	Il-2 m.H.	PQ 25 Ost 11327; 20 km (12 mi) south-southwest of Opatów
62	26 June 1944	15:30	P-39	PQ 24 Ost 49655; 25 km (16 mi) southwest of Kolomea	107♠	31 August 1944	17:52	Il-2 m.H.	PQ 25 Ost 11353; 20 km (12 mi) south-southwest of Opatów
63	26 June 1944	15:33	P-39? (Note: According to Mathews and Foreman claimed as a North American B-25 Mitchell.)	PQ 24 Ost 49663; 20 km (12 mi) south-southwest of Kolomea	108♠	31 August 1944	17:54	Il-2 m.H.?	PQ 25 Ost 11362; 20 km (12 mi) south of Opatów
64	7 July 1944	16:55	B-25?	PQ 24 Ost 50598; 20 km (12 mi) south-southwest of Kovel	109♠	31 August 1944	19:01	P-39?	PQ 25 Ost 11185; 10 km (6.2 mi) west of Opatów
65	14 July 1944	12:00	P-39?	PQ 24 Ost 41822; 25 km (16 mi) northwest of Brody	110♠	1 September 1944	10:00	Il-2 m.H.	PQ 25 Ost 11411; 15 km (9.3 mi) west of Sandomierz
66	14 July 1944	12:05	Il-2 m.H.	PQ 24 Ost 51741; 10 km (6.2 mi) northeast of Zolkiew	111♠	1 September 1944	10:01	Il-2 m.H.	PQ 25 Ost 11415; 15 km (9.3 mi) west of Sandomierz
67	14 July 1944	12:08	Il-2 m.H.?	PQ 24 Ost 51751; 10 km (6.2 mi) northeast of Brody	112♠	1 September 1944	10:04	Il-2 m.H.	PQ 25 Ost 11418; 15 km (9.3 mi) west of Sandomierz
—	14 July 1944	14:00~	P-39?		113♠	1 September 1944	14:04	Il-2 m.H.	PQ 25 Ost 11181; 10 km (6.2 mi) west of Opatów
68	15 July 1944	16:40	Il-2 m.H.?	PQ 25 Ost 41681; 30 km (19 mi) northwest of Brody	114♠	1 September 1944	14:06	Il-2 m.H.?	PQ 25 Ost 11321; 15 km (9.3 mi) south-southwest of Opatów
69	15 July 1944	16:44	Yak-9?	PQ 25 Ost 41656; 40 km (25 mi) northwest of Brody	115	2 September 1944	10:00	P-39?	PQ 25 Ost 11181; 10 km (6.2 mi) west of Opatów
70	16 July 1944	11:02	Il-2 m.H.	PQ 25 Ost 41617; 60 km (37 mi) north of Busk	116	2 September 1944	10:03	Il-2 m.H.	PQ 25 Ost 11316; 25 km (16 mi) southwest of Opatów
71	16 July 1944	11:03	Il-2 m.H.?	PQ 25 Ost 41655; 40 km (25 mi) northwest of Brody	117? (Note: This claim is not listed by Prien, Stemmer, Balke and Bock.)	2 September 1944	10:06	P-51	
– 2. Staffel of Kommando "Nowotny" – Defense of the Reich — October – November 1944
—	7 October 1944	—	B-24	Magdeburg/Rothensee	120	8 November 1944	10:36	P-51	Bielefeld
118	28 October 1944	12:04	P-51	Coesfeld	121	8 November 1944	10:37	P-51	Osnabrück
119	6 November 1944	10:57	P-47	Schorlingborsteler Beeke; Lake Dümmer	122	8 November 1944	10:40	P-51	vicinity of Südmerzen
– 10. Staffel of Jagdgeschwader 7 – Defense of the Reich — March – 10 April 1945
123	18 March 1945	11:15	P-51	Nauen-Rathenow-Brandenburg-Potsdam	129	31 March 1945	08:37–09:32	Lancaster	Hamburg
124	19 March 1945	14:00+	B-17	vicinity of Chemnitz	130	31 March 1945	08:37–09:32	P-51	Hamburg
125	21 March 1945	09:15~	P-51	northwest of Dresden	131	4 April 1945	09:00+	P-51	south of Bremen
126	22 March 1945	12:45~	P-51	Cottbus-Bautzen-Dresden	132	9 April 1945	—	Lancaster	Hamburg
127	24 March 1945	11:36–12:28	B-17	vicinity of Wittenberg	133	10 April 1945	—	P-51	
128	25 March 1945	10:10	P-51						

=== Awards ===
- Iron Cross (1939)
  - 2nd Class (14 July 1943)
  - 1st Class (24 August 1943)
- Front Flying Clasp of the Luftwaffe in Gold (27 July 1943)
- Honor Goblet of the Luftwaffe on 20 March 1944 as Leutnant and pilot (Note: According to Obermaier on 22 February 1944.)
- German Cross in Gold on 20 March 1944 as Leutnant in the I./Jagdgeschwader 52
- Knight's Cross of the Iron Cross on 10 October 1944 as Leutnant and Staffelführer in the I./Jagdgeschwader 52 (Note: According to Scherzer as Staffelführer of the 3./Jagdgeschwader 52)
