= Karl Schnörrer =

German fighter ace and Knight's Cross recipient

- Karl Schnörrer
- Born: 22 March 1919; Nuremberg
- Died: 25 September 1979 (aged 60); Nuremberg
- Military career
- Allegiance: Nazi Germany
- Branch: Luftwaffe
- Rank: Leutnant (second lieutenant)
- Nickname: Quax
- Units: JG 54, Kommando Nowotny, JG 7
- Commands: 9./JG 7
- Conflicts: See battles World War II: Eastern Front; Defense of the Reich
- Awards: Knight's Cross of the Iron Cross

Karl "Quax" Schnörrer (22 March 1919 – 25 September 1979) was a German military aviator who served in the Luftwaffe during World War II. As a fighter ace, he claimed 46 enemy aircraft shot down in 536 combat missions, eleven of which while flying the Messerschmitt Me 262 jet fighter in Defense of the Reich.

Born in Nuremberg, Schnörrer served in the Luftwaffe of Nazi Germany. Following flight training, he was posted to Jagdgeschwader 54 (JG 54—54th Fighter Wing) in 1941, operating on the Eastern Front. He claimed his first aerial victory on 13 December 1941. In October 1942, Schnörrer became the wingman of his friend Walter Nowotny. In November 1943, he was severely wounded after he was shot down. After his convalescence, he was posted to Erprobungskommando 262, an experimental unit testing the Me 262 jet fighter. He then served with Kommando Nowotny, an operational test unit led by Nowotny, experimenting with the Me 262 under combat conditions. Following the death of his friend Nowotny on 8 November 1944, Schnörrer was posted to Jagdgeschwader 7 "Nowotny" (JG 7—7th Fighter Wing), the first jet fighter wing. Flying with this unit, he was awarded the Knight's Cross of the Iron Cross on 22 March 1945. On 30 March, Schnörrer was forced to bail out from his damaged aircraft, sustaining severe injuries to his leg which then had to be amputated. Schnörrer died on 25 September 1979 in Nuremberg.

== Early life and career ==
Schnörrer was born on 22 March 1919 in Nuremberg, at the time in Free State of Bavaria. Prior to joining the military service, Schnörrer worked as a photo reporter. Starting in May 1940, Schnörrer was trained as a fighter pilot at the Jagdfliegerschule 5 in Wien-Schwechat where he befriended Walter Nowotny. (Note: Flight training in the Luftwaffe progressed through the levels A1, A2 and B1, B2, referred to as A/B flight training. A training included theoretical and practical training in aerobatics, navigation, long-distance flights and dead-stick landings. The B courses included high-altitude flights, instrument flights, night landings and training to handle the aircraft in difficult situations.) He "earned" his nickname "Quax" by crashing the difficult-to-control Messerschmitt Bf 109 fighter plane three times during his flight-training. The name of a popular accident-prone cartoon character of the time, it was taken from the movie Quax the Crash Pilot released in 1941 with the famous German actor Heinz Rühmann as "Quax".

== World War II ==
World War II in Europe began on Friday, 1 September 1939, when German forces invaded Poland. Schnörrer arrived on the Eastern Front as an Unteroffizier, soon after German forces had launched Operation Barbarossa, the invasion of the Soviet Union. There, he was assigned initially to the Ergänzungsgruppe of Jagdgeschwader 54 (JG 54—54th Fighter Wing). The Ergänzungsgruppe was a supplementary training group attached to JG 54 under the command of Hauptmann Leo Eggers. There, he was again reunited with Nowotny. In July, he was posted to 1. Staffel (1st squadron) of JG 54. He claimed his first victory on 13 December 1941, which was not confirmed. On this mission, Schnörrer, against orders, had broken formation to attack the enemy aircraft. The Schwarm, flight of four aircraft, had been led by Horst Ademeit who later criticized Schnörrer for his behavior.

=== Eastern Front ===
Schnörrer claimed his first confirmed aerial victory on 12 May 1942 over a Yakovlev Yak-1. On 13 August, he shot down a Petlyakov Pe-2 bomber, his only other claim in 1942. At the time, 1. Staffel was commanded by Oberleutnant Heinz Lange and subordinated to I. Gruppe (1st group) headed by Hauptmann Hans Philipp. On 25 October, Nowotny was transferred from 3. Staffel to take command of 1. Staffel from Lange. Nowotny then chose his friend Schnörrer to be his wingman. In mid-December, I. Gruppe began converting to the Focke-Wulf Fw 190 A-4 fighter aircraft. On 16 January 1943, 1. Staffel was ordered to Heiligenbeil, present-day Mamonovo, where most of the pilots received the Fw 190 aircraft.

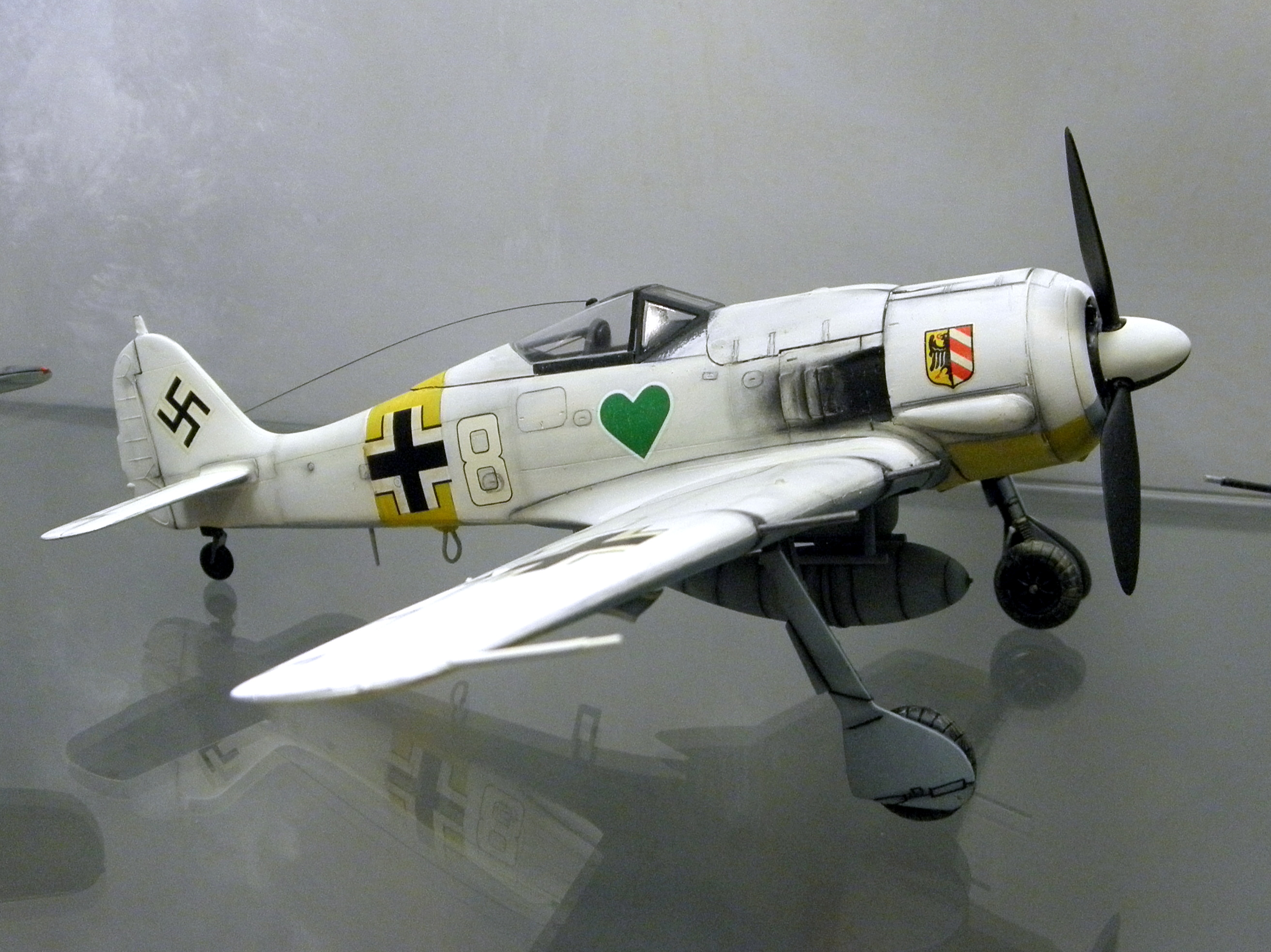
Scale model of Focke-Wulf Fw 190 A-4 JG 54.

As of 1 February, Nowotny, Schnörrer, Anton Döbele and Rudolf Rademacher, formed a team known as the "chain of devils" (Teufelskette) or the Nowotny Schwarm, which during the course of the war was credited with 524 combined aerial victories, making them the most successful team in the Luftwaffe. In February, I. Gruppe of JG 54 was fighting in the Siege of Leningrad. The combat area was predominantly in the east and southeast of Leningrad where Soviet forces had created a corridor to the city in Operation Iskra. On 23 February, Soviet forces launched an attack south of Leningrad as part of Operation Polyarnaya Zvezda. The attack was repelled by forces under the command of Generalleutnant Carl Hilpert. That day, all available aircraft of I. Gruppe flew missions in defense of this attack, predominantly attacking Soviet ground attack aircraft. By nightfall, the Gruppe reported 32 Soviet aircraft destroyed, including an Ilyushin Il-2 ground attack aircraft claimed by Schnörrer in the vicinity of Mga, southeast of Leningrad. On 15 March, Soviet forces attacked the German positions of the X. Armeekorps (10th Army Corps) south of Lake Ilmen, breaching the German lines south of Staraya Russa. Operating from an airfield at Gorodets, I. Gruppe claimed 21 aerial victories that day, including Schnörrer's fifth aerial victory. This victory was claimed over an Il-2 ground attack aircraft shot down southeast Staraya Russa.

On 1 April, the Gruppenkommandeur (group commander), Philipp was transferred and temporarily replaced by Hauptmann Gerhard Koall until Major Reinhard Seiler took command on 1 May. On 5 June, I. Gruppe flew combat air patrols in the area of Volkhov as well as escorting bombers from Kampfgeschwader 53 (KG 53—53rd Bomber Wing) attacking the locks in the harbor of Novaya Ladoga. There, the Gruppe fought against many Soviet fighter aircraft during the course of which Schnörrer claimed a Mikoyan-Gurevich MiG-3 fighter shot down. Three days later, I. Gruppe escorted bombers to the railroad bridges near Volkhovstroy. On this mission, Schnörrer claimed the destruction of a Lavochkin-Gorbunov-Gudkov LaGG-3 fighter aircraft. On 15 June, the Nowotny Schwarm was sent on a mission to the coastal area near Kronstadt. On this mission, Schnörrer claimed another LaGG-3 fighter shot down, his eighth aerial victory in total, while Nowotny claimed his 99th to 101st aerial victory. (Note: According to Held, Nowotny claimed his 100th aerial victory on 5 June 1943 on a mission to Novaya Ladoga.)

=== Operation Citadel ===
In early July, I. Gruppe of JG 54 was ordered to move to Oryol, in the southern sector of Army Group Centre, where it fought in Operation Citadel which initiated the Battle of Kursk. Subordinated to Luftflotte 6 (Air Fleet 6), the Gruppe began relocating on 2 July and arrived at the airfield name Panikowo, a makeshift airfield created for the attack on the Kursk salient, on 4 July. The next day, the Wehrmacht launched Operation Citadel and I. Gruppe supported the attack of the 9th Army on the northern sector of the salient, escorting bombers of Kampfgeschwader 4, 51 and KG 53 (KG 4, KG 51—4th, 51st Bomber Wing), as well as Junkers Ju 87 dive bombers of Sturzkampfgeschwader 1 (StG 1—1st Dive Bomber Wing) to their target areas. That day, I. Gruppe claimed 59 aerial victories, including a LaGG-3 fighter by Schnörrer in the vicinity of Maloarkhangelsk. The next day, I. Gruppe targeted the airspace near Ponyri and during multiple combat missions claimed 29 aerial victories which included a LaGG-3 shot down by Schnörrer at 14:33.

On 7 July, the Gruppe again operated over Ponyri where they claimed 35 aerial victories for no loss of their own, including a Douglas A-20 Havoc bomber, also known as "Boston", and a Lend-Lease Curtiss P-40 Warhawk fighter claimed by Schnörrer. By 14 July, Operation Citadel had failed after Soviet forces had launched Operation Kutuzov in the northern sector. Although in the southern sector, the offensive continued until 17 July in Operation Roland. That day, Schnörrer claimed an Il-2 ground attack aircraft and a LaGG-3 fighter destroyed. One of his opponents may have been a pilot from the Free French Régiment de Chasse Normandie-Niémen (Fighter Squadron 2/30 Normandie-Niemen). That day, Mayor Jean Tulasne led his unit on an Il-2 ground attack aircraft escort mission to Znamenskaya, 19 kilometers (12 miles) northwest of Oryol, losing three aircraft to I. and IV. Gruppe of JG 54. With German forces in retreat, Oryol was cleared on 5 August. Over the following days, I. Gruppe operated from an airfield at Karachev, located approximately halfway between Oryol and Bryansk, predominately flying over the combat area of Oryol. On 7 August, Schnörrer shot down two Il-2 ground attack aircraft in this area.

=== Battle at Kharkiv and Smolensk ===
On 9 August, I. Gruppe was ordered 400 kilometers (250 miles) south to Poltava Airfield where they were placed under the control of Luftflotte 4 (Air Fleet 4). The reason for this was a response to the successful Soviet Belgorod–Kharkiv offensive operation following the Battle of Kursk. On 11 August, Nowotny was temporarily appointed commander of I. Gruppe, a position he held until 15 September when he was officially assigned as Gruppenkommandeur. The next day, the Gruppe flew multiple combat air patrols and fighter escort for Ju 87 dive bombers in the area west of Kharkiv. On one of these missions, Schnörrer shot down a La-5 fighter. Over the following days, the Gruppe continued to escort for dive bombers to Grayvoron and Okhtyrka. On 16 August, Schnörrer shot down another La-5 fighter. Two days later, the Gruppe returned to Kharkiv and Okhtyrka where Schnörrer claimed a MiG-3 fighter shot down in the afternoon, his 20th claim. On 20 August, I. Gruppe again escorted Ju 87 dive bombers and Heinkel He 111 bombers to Okhtyrka. Without loss, I. Gruppe claimed 15 aerial victories, including a Pe-2 bomber and an Il-2 ground attack aircraft by Schnörrer. The next day, Schnörrer claimed another Il-2 ground attack aircraft shot down on a mission to Kharkiv.

On 27 August, I. Gruppe was withdrawn from the combat area of Kharkiv and ordered to the airfield Iwanowka which was located at Ordschonikidsegrad, present-day part of Bryansk, which again placed them under the control of Luftflotte 6. The reason for this relocation was Soviet success in the Battle of Smolensk and the pressure exerted on the 9th Army. Nowotny claimed his 200th aerial victory on 8 September. On 17 September, the Gruppe moved to Vitebsk. Schnörrer claimed his next aerial victory on 28 September, a LaGG-3 fighter. That day, I. Gruppe operated over Velizh, located approximately 75 kilometers (47 miles) northeast of Vitebsk. On 7 October, I. Gruppe again flew missions to combat area of Velizh where Schnörrer claimed a Bell P-39 Airacobra and P-40 fighter aircraft. Two days later, in combat near Nevel, he was credited with shooting down another P-39 fighter and an Il-2 ground attack aircraft.

On 14 October, to the southwest of Smolensk near Markovo, Nowotny became the first pilot to claim 250 aerial victories. That day, Schnörrer claimed his 33rd aerial victory, a P-40 shot down near Lyady. Schnörrer was awarded the German Cross in Gold (Deutsches Kreuz in Gold) on 21 October. On 11 November, the Nowotny Schwarm lost Döbele, who was killed in a mid-air collision with an Il-2 ground attack aircraft east of Vitebsk. The next day, Nowotny claimed his last aerial victory on the Eastern Front. A few minutes later Schnörrer shot down a Yakovlev Yak-9 attacking Nowotny for his own 35th victory claim. Schnörrer was then shot down in his Fw 190 A-5 (Werknummer 410021—factory number) south of Nevel by German anti-aircraft artillery. Bailing out at approximately 70 meters (230 feet), his parachute failed to deploy in time, and he crashed to the ground, breaking both legs and suffering a severe concussion. Schnörrer was then rescued by the German infantry and flown in a Junkers Ju 52 to a Luftwaffe hospital in Dölau, today part of Halle.

=== Flying the Messerschmitt Me 262 ===
Seven months later in June 1944, having recovered from his injuries, and commissioned as an officer, Leutnant Schnörrer was transferred to Erprobungskommando 262, a small unit doing flight-testing of the revolutionary new Messerschmitt Me 262 jet aircraft. In September, the fighter was ready to proceed to advanced combat-testing and his friend Nowotny was brought in to lead the project. On 26 September, the unit was re-designated Kommando Nowotny. But progress was slow and with the war-situation getting worse, an impatient General Adolf Galland arrived in early-November to get a personal report. On 8 November, in very poor weather conditions, Nowotny led a Schwarm of Me 262s into one of its first group combat missions and was killed in action, probably shot down after an engine flame-out left him defenceless. On 15 November, Schnörrer and Major Rudolf Schoenert, Oberst Gordon Gollob, Major Georg Christl, Hauptmann Heinz Strüning, Major Josef Fözö formed the guard of honor at Nowotny funeral at the Zentralfriedhof in Vienna. The eulogy was delivered by Generaloberst Otto Deßloch.

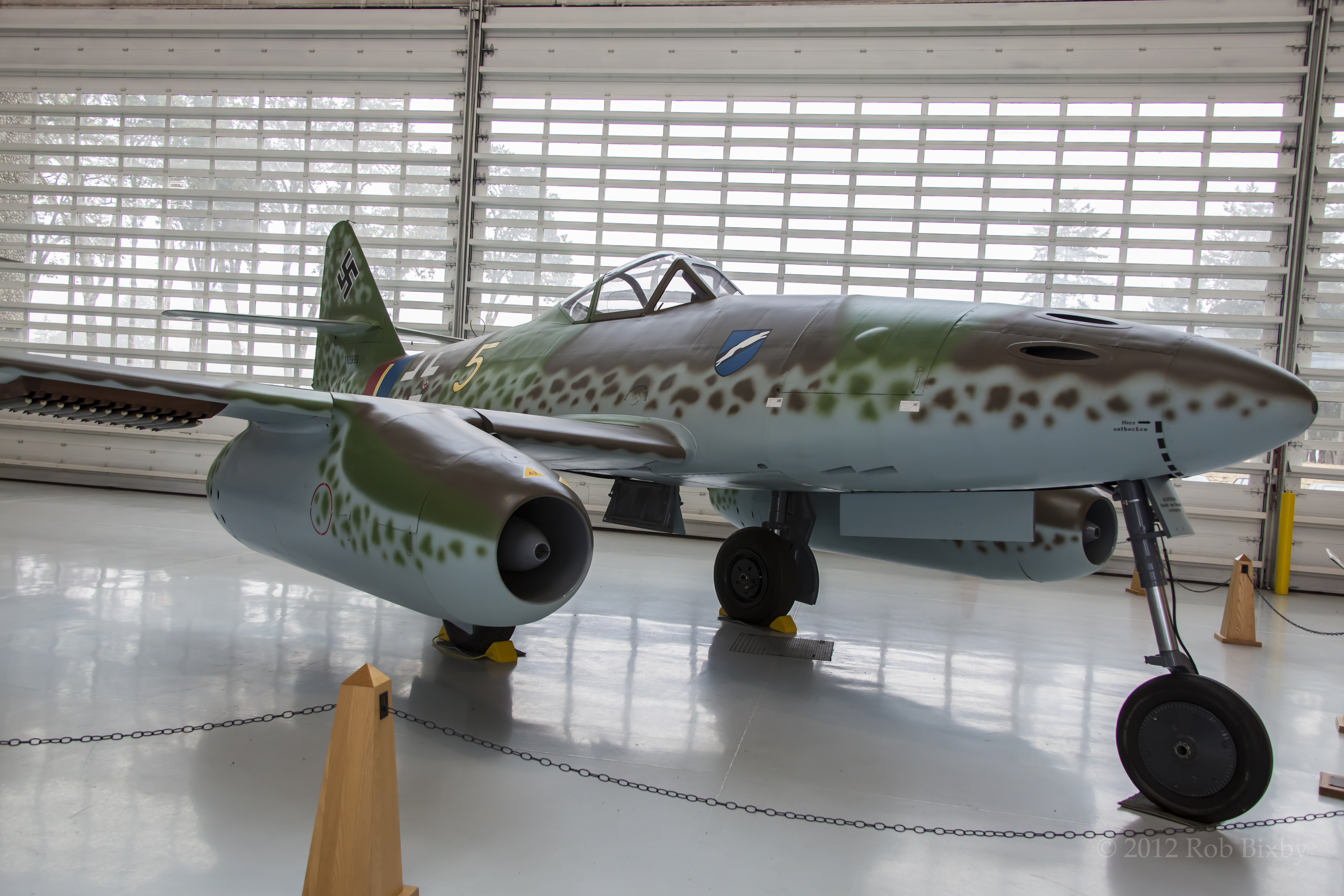
A Me 262 of JG 7 similar to those flown by Schnörrer on display at the Evergreen Aviation & Space Museum.

Following these events, Jagdgeschwader 7 "Nowotny" (JG 7—7th Fighter Wing) "Nowotny" was formed and placed under the command of Oberst Johannes Steinhoff. On 19 November, remnants of Kommando Nowotny was redesignated at Lechfeld Airfield to III. Gruppe of JG 7 and ordered to Brandenburg-Briest where they joined the Stab (headquarters unit). In consequence, the 1., 2. and 3. Staffel of Kommando Nowotny became the 9., 10, and 11. Staffel of III. Gruppe which Steinhoff had placed under the command of Major Erich Hohagen. Schnörrer was assigned to III. Gruppe of JG 7 flying in Defense of the Reich. (Note: Sources differ with respect to the Staffel Schnörrer was assigned to in III. Gruppe of JG 7. Smith and Creek place him in 9. Staffel. According to Forsyth, Schnörrer was assigned to 11. Staffel.) From February to March 1945, he claimed eleven aerial victories flying the Me 262 jet-fighter, making him one of the top jet-aces of the war. (Note: For a list of Luftwaffe jet aces see List of German World War II jet aces)

On 3 February 1945, the United States Army Air Forces (USAAF) Eighth Air Force attacked Brabag's synthetic fuel factory at Magdeburg. III. Gruppe of JG 7 was one of the Luftwaffe units scrambled to intercept the bombers. The USAAF lost 23 Boeing B-17 Flying Fortress bombers and seven North American P-51 Mustang fighters in the attack. Schnörrer was one of the Luftwaffe pilots to have claimed a B-17 shot down that day. On 9 February, over 1,200 heavy bombers of the Eighth Air Force attacked synthetic fuel factories, railroad and other targets. Close to Berlin, III. Gruppe intercepted a formation of B-17 bombers and their fighter escort. In this encounter, Schnörrer claimed the destruction of a P-51 fighter aircraft. (Note: According to Harvey, Schnörrer's opponent may have been Captain James William Browning from the 357th Fighter Group who was reported as missing in action that day. However, Chapis and Thomas state the Browning was killed in a mid-air collision with the Me 262 piloted by Oberst Volprecht Riedesel Freiherr zu Eisenbach, the Geschwaderkommodore (wing commander) of Kampfgeschwader 54(J) (KG 54(J)—54th Fighter Bomber Wing), who was also killed that day.) On 3 March 29 Me 262s from Stab and III. Gruppe intercepted USAAF heavy bombers heading for Magdeburg, Hannover, Hildesheim and Braunschweig. At approximately 10:15, Me 262s from 9. Staffel engaged in aerial combat with B-17 bombers between Braunschweig and Magdeburg. Schnörrer accounted for one of the B-17 bombers shot down that day.

On 18 March, the Eighth Air Force headed for various railway stations and tank factories in the greater Berlin area with 1,329 heavy bombers, escorted by 632 fighter aircraft. Flying from Parchim Airfield, 37 Me 262 fighters led by Major Theodor Weissenberger took off to intercept the bombers. For the first time, six of the Me 262 fighters were armed with the R4M unguided air-to-air rocket. Firing his rockets, Schnörrer shot down two B-17 bombers. On that mission, Oberleutnant Günther Wegmann, the Staffelkäpitan of 9. Staffel of JG 7, was wounded in aerial combat. In consequence, Schnörrer was temporary given command of 9. Staffel, a command position referred to as Staffelführer. The following day, 1,273 heavy bombers from the USAAF 3rd Air Division again attacked the synthetic fuel factories. The bombers were intercepted by 28 Me 262 fighters north of Chemnitz. In this encounter, Schnörrer shot down a B-17 bomber.

On 22 March, Schnörrer was awarded the Knight's Cross of the Iron Cross (Ritterkreuz des Eisernen Kreuzes) for 43 aerial victories claimed. On 30 March, the USAAF 3rd Air Division dispatched 1,320 heavy bombers, escorted by 852 fighter aircraft, to the U-boat pens and oil storage facilities at Hamburg, Bremen, Wilhelmshaven and Farge. Defending against this attack, Me 262s from I. and III. Gruppe of JG 7 were scrambled. The attack force was intercepted north of Lüneburg. At 13:30 Schnörrer shot down two B-17 bombers, his last aerial victories. He was then hit by crossfire from a third bomber. Pursued by P-51 fighters near Uelzen, he bailed out but his leg hit the tailplane on his exit. Although he landed safely his leg wounds were so serious that he had to have his leg amputated, thus ending his combat career. Command of 9. Staffel was then passed on to Oberleutnant Gustav Sturm

== Later life ==
After the war, Schnörrer worked as a photographer for the Deutsche Presse-Agentur (dpa). Schnörrer died on 25 September 1979 in Nuremberg, aged 60.

== Summary of career ==
=== Aerial victory claims ===
According to Obermaier, Schnörrer was credited with 46 aerial victories claimed in 536 combat missions. This figure includes 35 claims on the Eastern Front and 11 flying the Me 262 jet fighter over the Western Allies. Mathews and Foreman, authors of Luftwaffe Aces – Biographies and Victory Claims, researched the German Federal Archives and found records for 45 aerial victory claims, plus one further unconfirmed claim. This figure of confirmed claims includes 34 aerial victories on the Eastern Front and 11 on the Western Front flying the Me 262 jet fighter, including nine four-engined bombers.

Victory claims were logged to a map-reference (PQ = Planquadrat), for example "PQ 10662". The Luftwaffe grid map (Jägermeldenetz) covered all of Europe, western Russia and North Africa and was composed of rectangles measuring 15 minutes of latitude by 30 minutes of longitude, an area of about 360 square miles (930 km^{2}). These sectors were then subdivided into 36 smaller units to give a location area 3 km × 4 km (1.9 mi × 2.5 mi) in size.

Chronicle of aerial victories
This and the – (dash) indicates unconfirmed aerial victory claims for which Schnörrer did not receive credit.
Claim	Date	Time	Type	Location	Claim	Date	Time	Type	Location
– 1. Staffel of Jagdgeschwader 54 –
—	13 December 1941	—	unknown						
– 1. Staffel of Jagdgeschwader 54 – Eastern Front – 1 May 1942 – 3 February 1943
1	12 May 1942	14:45	Yak-1	PQ 10662; 35 km (22 mi) east of Lyuban	2	13 August 1942	20:40	Pe-2	PQ 02592
– 1. Staffel of Jagdgeschwader 54 – Eastern Front – 4 February – 31 December 1943
3	23 February 1943	07:07	Il-2	PQ 36 Ost 10181 east of Mga	19	18 August 1943	16:21	MiG-3	PQ 35 Ost 51862, Kantoschirow; 25 km (16 mi) east of Bohodukhiv
4	15 March 1943	08:12	Il-2	PQ 36 Ost 18251; 30 km (19 mi) southeast of Staraya Russa	20	19 August 1943	13:10	Pe-2	PQ 35 Ost 51362; 25 km (16 mi) northwest of Grayvoron
5	5 June 1943	12:18	MiG-3	PQ 36 Ost 21782; 15 km (9.3 mi) northwest of Volkhov	21	19 August 1943	15:50	Il-2	PQ 35 Ost 51544 northeast of Bohodukhiv
6	8 June 1943	16:18	LaGG-3	PQ 36 Ost 10283; 35 km (22 mi) west-southwest of Volkhov	22	20 August 1943	06:25	Il-2	PQ 35 Ost 51533 northeast of Bohodukhiv
7	15 June 1943	16:35	LaGG-3	PQ 26 Ost 90134, Borkij; 10 km (6.2 mi) west of Lomonosov	23	28 September 1943	08:25	LaGG-3	PQ 35 Ost 16513; 15 km (9.3 mi) southwest of Velizh
8	5 July 1943	15:42	LaGG-3	PQ 35 Ost 63591; 20 km (12 mi) south-southwest of Maloarkhangelsk	24	7 October 1943	16:17	P-39	PQ 35 Ost 17753; 25 km (16 mi) southwest of Toropets
9	6 July 1943	14:33	LaGG-3	PQ 35 Ost 63722; 35 km (22 mi) southwest of Maloarkhangelsk	25	7 October 1943	16:17	P-40	PQ 35 Ost 17781; 30 km (19 mi) southwest of Toropets
10	7 July 1943	14:12	Boston	PQ 35 Ost 63834; 55 km (34 mi) north-northwest of Kursk	26	9 October 1943	09:25	P-39	PQ 25 Ost 96232, southeast of Nevel
11	7 July 1943	14:20	P-40	PQ 35 Ost 63561; 10 km (6.2 mi) southwest of Maloarkhangelsk	27	9 October 1943	13:35	Il-2	east of Lugowskija
12	14 July 1943	15:50	La-5	PQ 35 Ost 54413; 40 km (25 mi) west-southwest of Belyov	28	11 October 1943	14:30	Il-2	PQ 35 Ost 06283, east of Kosadojewo
13	17 July 1943	17:03	Il-2 m.H. (Note: The "m.H." refers to an Ilyushin Il-2 with rear gunner (mit Heckschütze).)	PQ 35 Ost 54489; 20 km (12 mi) northwest of Bolkhov	29	12 October 1943	14:25	LaGG-3	PQ 35 Ost 15551, east of Leninsk; 20 km (12 mi) northwest of Gorki
14	17 July 1943	17:06	LaGG-3	PQ 35 Ost 54483; 20 km (12 mi) northwest of Bolkhov	30	13 October 1943	09:33	La-5	PQ 35 Ost 15542, south of Leninsk northeast of Lenin
15	7 August 1943	11:32	Il-2	PQ 35 Ost 54731; 25 km (16 mi) east-northeast of Karachev	31	13 October 1943	09:55	La-5	PQ 35 Ost 15521, northeast of Scheino
16	7 August 1943	13:54	Il-2	PQ 35 Ost 54732; 25 km (16 mi) east-northeast of Karachev	32	14 October 1943	11:18	P-40	PQ 35 Ost 15381, south of Lyady
17	12 August 1943	08:57	La-5	PQ 35 Ost 51854; 15 km (9.3 mi) east of Bohodukhiv	33	10 November 1943	14:30	Il-2	Lake Ordovo
18	16 August 1943	15:25	La-5	PQ 35 Ost 60132; Gulf of Finland, north of Kunda	34	12 November 1943	10:08	Yak-9	Lake Orowaz
– 9. Staffel of Jagdgeschwader 7 – Defense of the Reich – – 30 February March 1945
35	3 February 1945	—	B-17	vicinity of Berlin	41	21 March 1945	09:15~	B-17	northwest of Dresden
36	9 February 1945	—	P-51	vicinity of Berlin	42	22 March 1945	12:45~	B-17	Cottbus-Bautzen-Dresden
37	3 March 1945	10:15~	B-17	vicinity of Braunschweig	43	25 March 1945	10:10	P-51	
38	18 March 1945	11:20~	B-17	vicinity of Rathenow	44	30 March 1945	13:30~	B-17	vicinity of Hamburg
39	18 March 1945	11:20~	B-17	vicinity of Rathenow	45	30 March 1945	13:30~	B-17	vicinity of Hamburg
40	19 March 1945	—	B-17	vicinity of Chemnitz					

=== Awards ===
- Pilot's Badge (6 May 1941)
- Eastern Front Medal (6 August 1942)
- Wound Badge in Black (13 November 1943)
- Order of the Cross of Liberty 2nd Class (22 November 1942)
- Front Flying Clasp of the Luftwaffe in Gold for fighter pilots (14 November 1942)
- Iron Cross (1939)
  - 2nd Class (16 September 1942)
  - 1st Class (22 June 1943)
- Honor Goblet of the Luftwaffe on 1 November 1943 as Feldwebel and pilot (Note: According to Held on 18 October 1943.)
- German Cross in Gold on 21 October 1943 as Leutnant in the I./Jagdgeschwader 54
- Knight's Cross of the Iron Cross on 22 March 1945 as Leutnant of the Reserves and Staffelführer of the 11./Jagdgeschwader 7

== Notes ==
Military offices
Preceded by Oberleutnant Günther Wegmann	Squadron Leader of 9./JG 7; 19 March 1945 – 30 March 1945	Succeeded by Oberleutnant Gustav Sturm
