= List of German World War II jet aces =

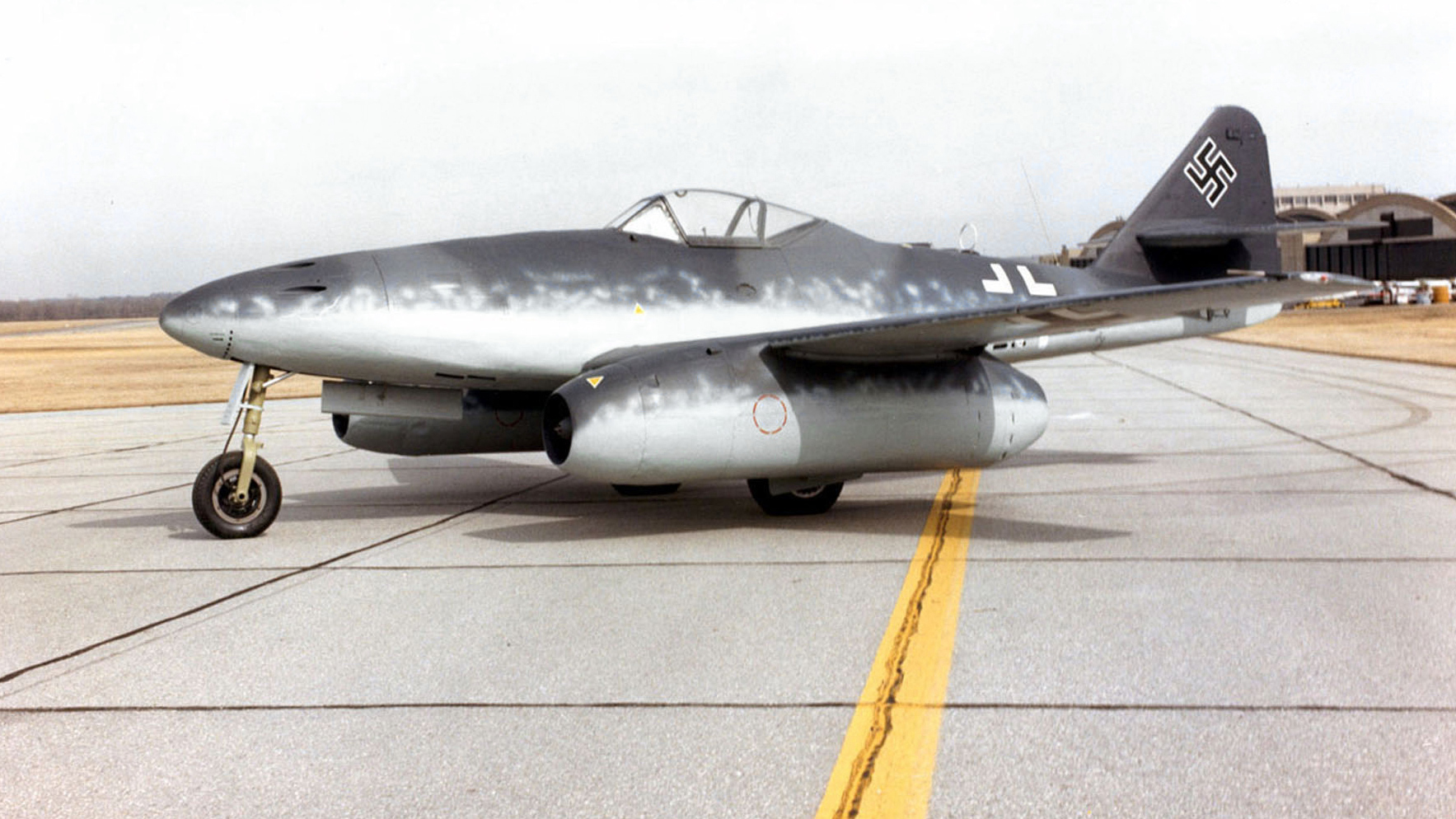
Messerschmitt Me 262A

This list of German World War II jet aces has a sortable table of notable German jet ace pilots during World War II.

== Background ==
A flying ace or fighter ace is a military aviator credited with shooting down five or more enemy aircraft during aerial combat, though the Germans traditionally set the threshold at 10 victories. During World War II, hundreds of German Luftwaffe fighter pilots achieved this feat flying contemporary piston engine fighter aircraft. However, only 28 pilots are credited with shooting down five or more enemy aircraft while flying a jet-powered aircraft.

Jet aircraft first engaged in air combat on 26 July 1944, when Leutnant Alfred Schreiber, flying Messerschmitt Me 262 A-1a W.Nr. 130 017 (German language: Werknummer – factory serial number), attacked an unarmed photo-reconnaissance De Havilland Mosquito PR Mk XVI, of No. 540 Squadron RAF, over the Alps. Some sources refer to this as the first victory in air combat by a pilot of a jet fighter, although the crew of the damaged Mosquito managed to return to an Allied airfield in Italy.

The first confirmed destruction of an enemy aircraft by an Me 262 pilot occurred on 8 August 1944, when Leutnant Joachim Weber shot down a Mosquito PR XVI from No. 540 Squadron, over Ohlstadt, in Bavaria.

On 15 August 1944, Schreiber took off to intercept a Mosquito PR XVI (NS520) of 60 Squadron, South African Air Force crewed by Captain S. Pienaar and Lieutenant A. Lockhart-Ross, who were tasked with photographing airfields in the Black Forest area. Schreiber caused severe damage in his first attack and made more than 10 passes at the Mosquito before low fuel levels cause him to break off. Pienaar and Lockhart-Ross survived a crash landing at San Severo in Italy; their reconnaissance film and debriefing provided the Allies with valuable intelligence on the Me 262.

During 1944–45, the Luftwaffe committed two other jet- or rocket-powered fighters to combat operations. In addition to the Me 262, the Messerschmitt Me 163 Komet and the Heinkel He 162 Volksjäger both become operational. Few claims were made by pilots of the Me 163 and He 162, and none achieved ace status on either of these types.

== German jet aces ==
This along with the * (asterisk), indicates that the pilot was either killed in action or killed in a flying accident.
This and the ! (exclamation mark) indicates those aerial victories listed by Hinchliffe, Morgan, and Weal.
This and the # (hash mark) indicates those aerial victories listed by Mathews and Foreman.
The list is initially sorted by the number of jet victories claimed.

Name	Rank	Claims flying jets!	Claims flying jets#	Jet fighter unit(s)	Total wartime claims	Notes
Kurt Welter	Oberleutnant	20+ (Note: According to Hinchliffe, Kurt Welter is credited in excess of 20 aerial victories while flying the Me 262, but the exact number is disputed.)	16	Kdo Welter, 10./NJG 11	63	Possible all-time leading jet ace.
Heinrich Bär	Oberstleutnant	16	18	EJG 2, JV 44	220	Started jet combat in 1945; flew the only Me 262 A-1a/U5 with 6-30mm MK108s
Franz Schall*	Hauptmann	14	16	Kdo Nowotny, JG 7	137	Killed in flying accident 10 April 1945
Hermann Buchner	Oberfeldwebel	12	12	Kdo Nowotny; JG 7	58	
Georg-Peter Eder	Major	12		Kdo Nowotny; JG 7	78	Wounded 16 February 1945
Erich Rudorffer	Major	12	12	JG 7	222	
Karl Schnörrer	Leutnant	11	11	EKdo 262; Kdo Nowotny; JG 7	46	Wounded 30 March 1945
Erich Büttner*	Oberfeldwebel	8	7	EKdo 262; Kdo Nowotny; JG 7	8	Killed in action 20 March 1945
Helmut Lennartz	Feldwebel	8	7+	EKdo 262; Kdo Nowotny; JG 7	13	First aerial victory over a B-17 Flying Fortress by a jet fighter on 15 August 1944.
Rudolf Rademacher	Leutnant	8	16	JG 7	126	
Walter Schuck	Oberleutnant	8	8	JG 7	206	
Günther Wegmann	Oberleutnant	8	8	EKdo 262; JG 7	14	Wounded 18 March 1945
Hans-Dieter Weihs	Leutnant	8		JG 7	8	Midair collision with Hans Waldmann on 18 March 1945, killing Waldmann.
Theodor Weissenberger	Major	8	8	JG 7	208	
Alfred Ambs	Leutnant	7	7	JG 7	7	
Heinz Arnold*	Oberfeldwebel	7	7	JG 7	49	Killed in action 17 April 1945; Arnold's Me 262 A-1a W.Nr.500491 "Yellow 7" of II./JG 7 bearing his personal victory marks is now on display at the Smithsonian Institution, Washington, DC.
Karl-Heinz Becker	Feldwebel	7	7	10./NJG 11	7	
Adolf Galland	Generalleutnant	7	6	JV 44	104	Assigned to create JV44 in March 1945. Wounded 26 April 1945
Franz Köster	Unteroffizier	7		EJG 2 JG 7 JV 44	7	
Fritz Müller	Leutnant	6	7	JG 7	22	
Johannes Steinhoff	Oberst	6	6	JG 7 JV 44	176	Wounded 18 April 1945
Helmut Baudach*	Oberfeldwebel	5	7	Kdo Nowotny; JG 7	20	Killed in action 22 February 1945
Heinrich Ehrler*	Major	5	8	JG 7	206	Killed in action 4 April 1945
Hans Grünberg	Oberleutnant	5	5	JG 7 JV 44	82	
Joseph Heim*	Gefreiter	5	5	JG 7	5	Killed in action 10 April 1945
Klaus Neumann	Leutnant	5		JG 7 JV 44	37	
Alfred Schreiber*	Leutnant	5		Kdo Nowotny; JG 7	5	First jet ace in aviation history Killed in flying accident 26 November 1944
Wolfgang Späte	Major	5	5	(JG 400); JV 44	99	
