= Heinz Arnold =

German World War II fighter pilot (1919–1945)

- Born: 12 February 1919; Flöha, Saxony, Weimar Republic
- Died: 17 April 1945 (aged 26) MIA
- Military career
- Allegiance: Nazi Germany
- Branch: Luftwaffe
- Rank: Oberfeldwebel (master sergeant)
- Units: JG 5, JG 7
- Conflicts: World War II

Heinz Arnold (12 February 1919 – 17 April 1945) was a German Luftwaffe fighter ace. He is credited with 49 aerial victories including seven victories claimed flying the Messerschmitt Me 262 jet fighter. (Note: For a list of Luftwaffe Jet aces see List of German World War II jet aces)

== Career ==
Arnold joined the Luftwaffe in September 1939, training for a technical role with the Kampffliegerschule at Tutow. Arnold began flying training in January 1940 with Flieger Ausbildungs Rgt. 12., before advanced training with Jagdfliegerschule 5 in late 1940. Arnold was then posted to Jagdgeschwader 5 (JG 5—5th Fighter Wing) on the Arctic Front.

On 15 June 1944, Arnold claimed two aerial victories, taking his total to 10. As part of the group expansion from three Staffeln per Gruppe to four Staffeln per Gruppe, Arnold's 7. Staffel was re-designated and became the 10. Staffel of JG 5 on 15 August. At the same time, the Staffel was placed under command of Leutnant Walter Schuck. On 26 September, defending against an attack on Vardø, Arnold claimed three Yakovlev Yak-9 fighters shot down, taking his total to 40 aerial victories.

=== Flying the Messerschmitt Me 262 ===
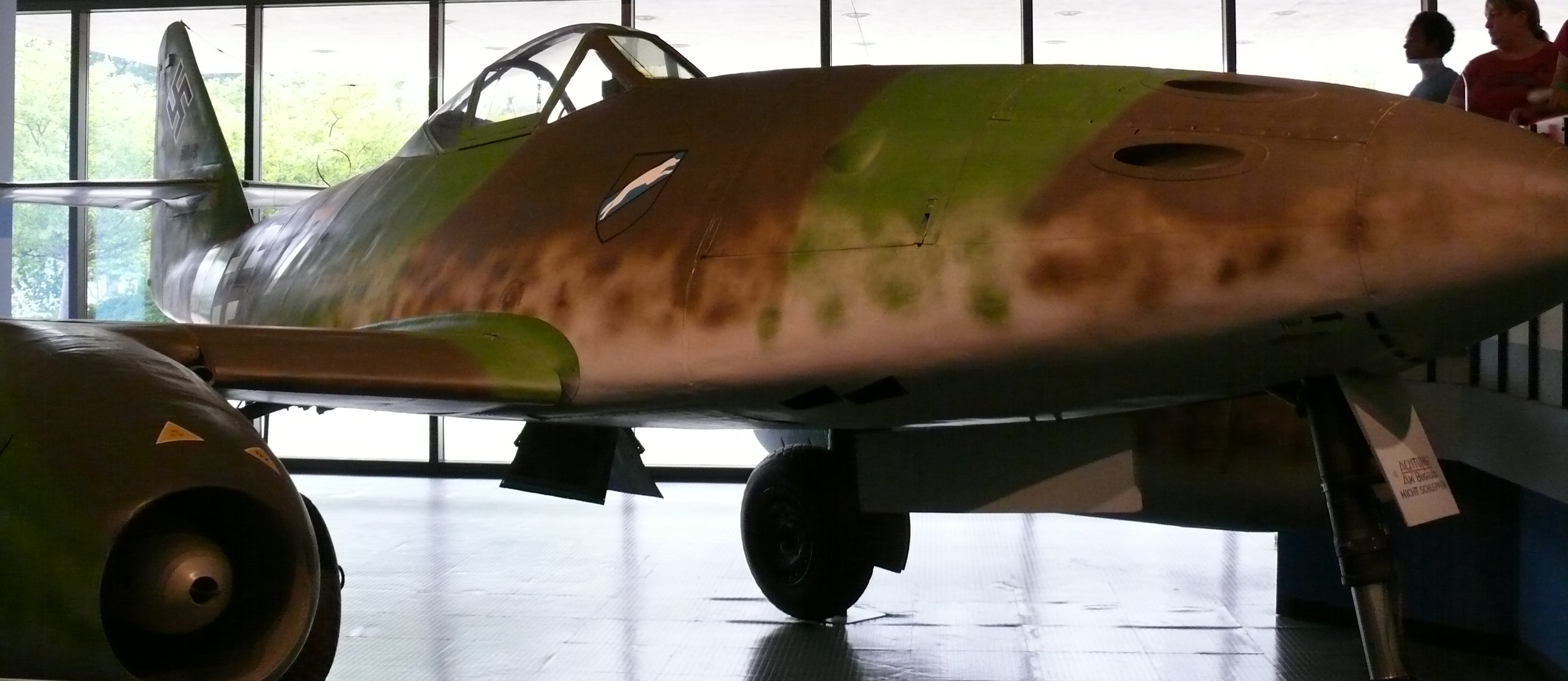
The Me 262 A Werknummer 500491 displays a figure 42 and seven vertical bars indicating Arnold's number of aerial victories.

Jagdgeschwader 7 "Nowotny" (JG 7—7th Fighter Wing) "Nowotny" was created from the experimental unit Kommando Nowotny in November 1944 and was equipped with the then revolutionary new Messerschmitt Me 262 jet aircraft. JG 7 was placed under the command of Oberst Johannes Steinhoff. On 19 November, remnants of Kommando Nowotny was redesignated at Lechfeld Airfield to III. Gruppe of JG 7 and ordered to Brandenburg-Briest where they joined the Stab (headquarters unit). In consequence, the 1., 2. and 3. Staffel of Kommando Nowotny became the 9., 10, and 11. Staffel of III. Gruppe which Steinhoff had placed under the command of Major Erich Hohagen. There, Arnold was assigned to 11. Staffel. At the time, the Staffel was commanded by Oberleutnant Günther Wegmann. From March to April 1945, he claimed seven aerial victories flying the Me 262 jet-fighter in Defense of the Reich, making him one of the top jet-aces of the war.

On 3 March 29 Me 262s from Stab and III. Gruppe intercepted United States Army Air Forces (USAAF) heavy bombers heading for Magdeburg, Hannover, Hildesheim and Braunschweig. Near Magdeburg, Me 262s from 10. and 11. Staffel intercepted the bombers of the 2nd Air Division and 3rd Air Division. During this encounter, Arnold claimed a Boeing B-17 Flying Fortress bomber and an escorting Republic P-47 Thunderbolt fighter shot down. On 18 March, Wegmann, the commander of 11. Staffel was wounded in combat. In consequence, Leutnant Karl Schnörrer was given command of the Staffel. The next day, Me 262s led by Schnörrer intercepted 374 B-17 bombers of the 3rd Air Division heading for the Carl Zeiss AG optical factories at Jena. On this mission, Arnold claimed a B-17 bomber shot down.

Arnold's Me 262 A-1a (Werknummer 500491—factory number) "Yellow 7" was unserviceable at Alt Lönnewitz when, on 17 April 1945, Arnold took a replacement Me 262 A-1a into an action from which he failed to return. Arnold went missing in action during a ground-attack mission in the Thuringian Forest area of Germany. Alternatively, Arnold may have been shot down by First Lieutenant James A. Steiger from the 357th Fighter Group during an attack on a B-17 of the 305th Bombardment Group on a mission to bomb Berlin.

His Me 262 (Werknummer 500491) bearing his personal victory marks is now on display at the Smithsonian Institution, Washington, D.C., USA.

== Aerial victory claims ==
Mathews and Foreman, authors of Luftwaffe Aces – Biographies and Victory Claims, researched the German Federal Archives and state that Arnold was credited with 48 aerial victories. This figure includes 41 claims made on the Eastern Front and seven on the Western Front, including five four-engined bombers, flying the Me 262 jet fighter.

Victory claims were logged to a map-reference (PQ = Planquadrat), for example "PQ 37 Ost PC-4/8". The Luftwaffe grid map (Jägermeldenetz) covered all of Europe, western Russia and North Africa and was composed of rectangles measuring 15 minutes of latitude by 30 minutes of longitude, an area of about 360 square miles (930 km^{2}). These sectors were then subdivided into 36 smaller units to give a location area 3 km × 4 km (1.9 mi × 2.5 mi) in size.

Chronicle of aerial victories
This and the ♠ (Ace of spades) indicates those aerial victories which made Arnold an "ace-in-a-day", a term which designates a fighter pilot who has shot down five or more airplanes in a single day. This and the ? (question mark) indicates information discrepancies listed by Prien, Stemmer, Rodeike, Balke, Bock, Mombeek, Mathews, and Foreman.
Claim	Date	Time	Type	Location	Claim	Date	Time	Type	Location
– 7. Staffel of Jagdgeschwader 5 – Eastern Front — 1 January – 15 August 1944
1	23 April 1944	10:38	Boston	PQ 37 Ost PC-4/8	16♠	17 June 1944	21:29	P-39	PQ 37 Ost RB-6/6
2	23 April 1944	10:45	Boston	PQ 37 Ost PC-7/6 north of Rybachy Peninsula	17♠	17 June 1944	21:30	Yak-9	PQ 37 Ost RB-8/1
3	11 May 1944	03:18	Il-2	PQ 37 Ost QE-8/1	18♠	17 June 1944	21:33	Boston	PQ 37 Ost RC-4/3
4	11 May 1944	03:21	Il-2	PQ 37 Ost RC-9/3	19♠	17 June 1944	21:38	Il-2	PQ 37 Ost RD-9/3
5	11 May 1944	07:44	Boston	PQ 37 Ost RC-1/1	20	27 June 1944	16:40	Yak-9	PQ 37 Ost SC-7/4
6	25 May 1944	21:42	P-40	northeast of Berlevåg northeast of Hamningberg	21	27 June 1944	16:44	Yak-9	PQ 37 Ost RB-7/1, northwest of Pummanki
7	25 May 1944	21:45	Boston	north-northeast of Berlevåg	22	27 June 1944	16:45	Boston	PQ 37 Ost RB-5/4
8	25 May 1944	21:46	Boston	north-northeast of Berlevåg	23	27 June 1944	23:58	P-39	PQ 37 Ost SB-3/1
9	15 June 1944	02:34	Yak-9	PQ 37 Ost RD-6/6	24♠	28 June 1944	00:11	P-39	PQ 37 Ost SU-2/6
10	15 June 1944	02:48	Yak-9	PQ 37 Ost RD-8/2	25♠	28 June 1944	00:13	Boston	PQ 37 Ost RC-3/7
11♠	17 June 1944	07:48	P-40	PQ 37 Ost PC-8/6	26♠	28 June 1944	00:15	P-39	PQ 37 Ost RC-4/6
12♠	17 June 1944	07:49	P-40	PQ 37 Ost PC-6/2	27♠	28 June 1944	03:48	Yak-9	PQ 37 Ost RD-4/7
13♠	17 June 1944	08:05	Boston	PQ 37 Ost QC-1/7	28♠	28 June 1944	03:49	P-40	PQ 37 Ost RD-7/7
14♠	17 June 1944	08:07	P-39	PQ 37 Ost QC-3/5	29♠	28 June 1944	03:51	Boston	PQ 37 Ost SB-9/2
15♠	17 June 1944	19:57? (Note: According to Mombeek claimed at 19:37.)	P-39	PQ 37 Ost RB-8/7	30♠	28 June 1944	04:01	Yak-9	PQ 37 Ost RC-9/4
– 10. Staffel of Jagdgeschwader 5 – Eastern Front — 15 August – 8 November 1944
31	15 September 1944	07:25	P-39	PQ 37 Ost RD-8/4	37♠	16 September 1944? (Note: According to Mombeek, Mathews and Foreman claimed on 17 September 1944.)	17:42	P-40	PQ 37 Ost RD-5/8
32	15 September 1944	07:32	P-39	PQ 37 Ost RD-7/6	38	26 September 1944	14:36	Yak-9	PQ 37 Ost RB-6/2
33♠	16 September 1944	12:05	P-39	PQ 37 Ost SA-3/4	39	26 September 1944	14:39	Yak-9	PQ 37 Ost RC-1/5
34♠	16 September 1944	12:08	Il-2	PQ 37 Ost SB-4/1	40	26 September 1944	14:43	Yak-9	PQ 37 Ost RD-4/4
35♠	16 September 1944?	17:30	P-40	PQ 37 Ost QA-6/9	41	27 September 1944	11:48	P-39	PQ 37 Ost QA-7/7
36♠	16 September 1944?	17:33	P-40	PQ 37 Ost QA-7/9					
– 11. Staffel of Jagdgeschwader 7 "Nowotny" – Defense of the Reich — March 1945
42	3 March 1945	—	P-47	vicinity of Genthin	46	21 March 1945	09:15±	B-17	vicinity of Dresden
43	3 March 1945	—	B-17	vicinity of Genthin	47	22 March 1945	12:45±	B-17	Cottbus—Bautzen—Dresden
44	7 March 1945	—	P-51	vicinity of Wittenberg	48	24 March 1945	12:45±	B-17	vicinity of Wittenberg
45	19 March 1945	—	B-17	north of Chemnitz					
