= Kommando Nowotny =

- Active: September 1944 – November 1944
- Country: Nazi Germany
- Branch: Luftwaffe
- Type: Fighter aircraft unit
- Role: Aerial warfare Air combat manoeuvring Air supremacy Airstrike
- Size: Air Force Gruppe

Commanders
- Notable commanders: Walter Nowotny; Erich Hohagen

Aircraft flown
- Fighter: Messerschmitt Me 262

Kommando Nowotny was a Luftwaffe fighter Gruppe formed during the last months of World War II for testing and establishing tactics for the Messerschmitt Me 262 jet fighter, and was created and first commanded by Walter Nowotny, from whom it drew its name.

== Formation ==
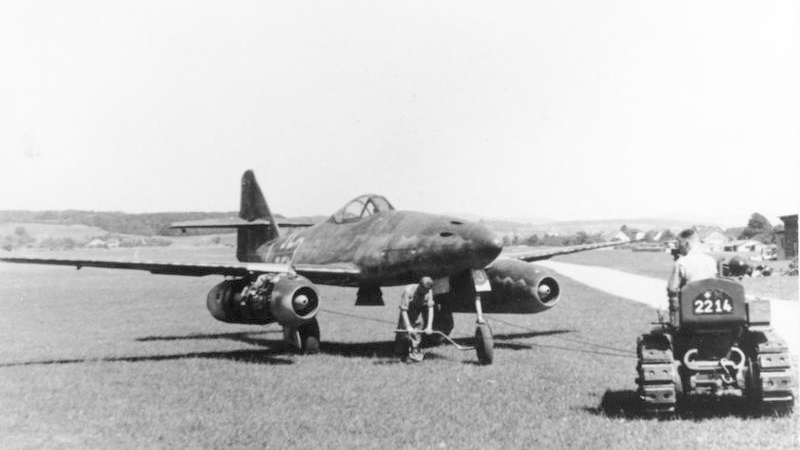
Me 262 A, similar to those flown by Kdo. Nowotny

Kommando Nowotny (Kdo. Nowotny—Commando Nowotny) was formed on 26 September 1944 following the disestablishment of the earlier Erprobungskommando 262 test unit at Lechfeld Airfield, sometimes also referred to as Kommondo Thierfelder which was named after its former commander Hauptmann Werner Thierfelder. Operational status was reached on 3 October at Achmer Airfield and Hesepe. The Stab (headquarters unit) of Kommando Nowotny was created from the Stab of III. Gruppe (3rd group) of Zerstörergeschwader 26 (ZG 26—26th Destroyer Wing). (Note: For an explanation of the meaning of Luftwaffe unit designation see Luftwaffe Organization) At first, III. Gruppe of ZG 26 was renamed to III. Gruppe of Jagdgeschwader 6 (JG 6—6th Fighter Wing). During this transition, 8. and 9. Staffeln (squadrons) of ZG 26 became 9. and 10. Staffel of JG 6. On 16 October, III. Gruppe was detached from JG 6 and was renamed to Kommando Nowotny.

In consequence, the Stab of III. Gruppe of JG 6 became the Stab of Kdo. Nowotny while 9. and 10. Staffel of JG 6 respectively became 1. and 2. Staffel of Kdo. Nowotny. On 5 November, the creation of a 3rd Staffel was ordered, to be completed by 30 November. The creation of a 4th Staffel was ordered on 12 November but never implemented. The objective of Kdo. Nowotny was to evaluate and establish tactics for the newly developed Messerschmitt Me 262 jet fighter. General der Jagdflieger (General of the Fighter Force) Adolf Galland had hoped that the Me 262 would compensate for the United States Army Air Forces (USAAF) numerical superiority. The units first commander and namesake was Major Walter Nowotny who had previously commanded I. Gruppe of Jagdgeschwader 54 (JG 54—54th Fighter Wing) on the Eastern Front and the training unit Jagdgeschwader 101 (JG 101—101st Fighter Wing).

== Operational history ==
After Nowotny took command of the Kommando, he submitted a demand for staff, requesting many former JG 54 pilots as possible. He replaced Oberleutnant Hans-Günter Müller, the commanding officer of the Staffel based at Hesepe, with Oberleutnant Alfred Teumer. Teumer received some training on the Me 262 at Rechlin. On 4 October, Teumer flew from Rechlin to Hesepe. During the landing approach, Teumer's aircraft suffered engine failure killing him in the resulting crash.

Following Nowotny's death on 8 November, the Kommando was withdrawn from combat operations and its pilots sent to Ergänzungs-Jagdgeschwader 2, a replacement training unit at Lechfeld Airfield, for further training. Jagdgeschwader 7 "Nowotny" (JG 7—7th Fighter Wing) "Nowotny" was then formed and placed under the command of Oberst Johannes Steinhoff. On 19 November, remnants of Kommando Nowotny was redesignated at Lechfeld Airfield to III. Gruppe of JG 7 and ordered to Brandenburg-Briest where they joined the Stab of JG 7. In consequence, the 1., 2. and 3. Staffel of Kdo. Nowotny became the 9., 10, and 11. Staffel of III. Gruppe of JG 7 which Steinhoff had placed under the command of Major Erich Hohagen. On 24 November, Kommando Nowotny was officially disbanded and ceased to exist as an independent unit. Due to the experimental nature of the unit, and the technical difficulties in operating the jet fighters, the unit had a less than illustrious record. In the time from 4 October to 24 November, a total of 24 enemy aircraft were claimed shot down for a loss of 28 Me 262s either damaged or destroyed.

== Losses ==
Date	Werknummer factory number	Fate	Pilot
4 October 1944	170044	Engine failure on landing at Hesepe, 75% damage	Oberleutnant Alfred Teumer killed in flying accident
4 October 1944	170047	Landing gear failure during landing at Braunschweig-Waggum, 25% damage	Hauptmann Franz Schall
5 October 1944	110405	Out fuel resulting in an emergency landing on the Autobahn near Braunschweig, 10% damage	Oberfeldwebel Helmut Baudach
7 October 1944	170307	Aerial combat near Achmer, crashed west of Bramsche, 100% damage	Oberleutnant Paul Bley bailed out
7 October 1944	110395	Strafed by North American P-51 Mustang fighters during takeoff, 100% damage	Oberfähnrich Heinz Russel wounded
7 October 1944	110405	Shot down during takeoff, exploded in midair, 100% damage	Leutnant Gerhard Kobert killed in action
12 October 1944	110388	Out fuel resulting in an emergency landing at Steenwijk, 15% damage	Oberleutnant Paul Bley
12 October 1944	110402	Out fuel resulting in an emergency landing at Bramsche, 10% damage	Oberfeldwebel Helmut Lennartz
12 October 1944	110399	Takeoff accident due to pilot error at Achmer, 99% damage	Oberingenieur Karl Leuthner, civilian test pilot killed in flying accident
13 October 1944	110401	Landing gear failure during landing, aircraft crashed and flipped over at Hesepe, 75% damage	Oberfähnrich Heinz Russel
28 October 1944	110481	Engine failure following a bird strike during takeoff and crashed at Achmer, 99% damage	Oberleutnant Paul Bley killed in flying accident
28 October 1944	110479	Landing gear failure during landing, aircraft crashed at Hesepe, 12% damage	Hauptmann Franz Schall
29 October 1944	110387	Mid-air collision with a Supermarine Spitfire, aircraft crashed near Sieringhoek-Bad Bentheim, 100% damage	Leutnant Alfred Schreiber bailed out
1 November 1944	110386	Aerial combat with North American P-51 Mustang and Republic P-47 Thunderbolt fighters near Arnhem and Zwolle, 99% damage	Oberfähnrich Willi Banzhaff bailed out
2 November 1944	110368	Engine failure, crashed during attempted emergency landing 3 kilometers (1.9 miles) southeast of Achmer, 99% damage	Unteroffizier Alois Söllner killed in flying accident
2 November 1944	170278	Crash landing at Achmer following combat mission, 30% damage	Oberfeldwebel Siegfried Göbel
4 November 1944	110403	Out fuel following aerial combat with Republic P-47 Thunderbolt fighters resulting in an emergency landing at Bohmte, 55% damage	Oberfeldwebel Siegfried Göbel
4 November 1944	170310	Emergency landing at Hesepe following aerial combat and engine failure, 95% damage	Oberfeldwebel Helmut Zander
4 November 1944	110483	Shot down in aerial combat near Hittfeld/Dibbersen/Eddelsen, 99% damage	Oberfähnrich Willi Banzhaff killed in action
6 November 1944	110389	Emergency landing at Lemwerder, ground collision following aerial combat and damage sustained by the German anti-aircraft artillery, 50% damage	Leutnant Herbert Spangenberg
6 November 1944	170045	Engine failure during maintenance flight resulting in an emergency landing at Hesepe, 25% damage	Oberfeldwebel Helmut Baudach
6 November 1944	110402	Out fuel following aerial combat resulting in an emergency landing at Ahlhorn, 30% damage	Oberfeldwebel Kreutzberg
6 November 1944	110490	Out fuel following aerial combat resulting in an emergency landing near Bassum, 30% damage	Oberfeldwebel Helmut Lennartz
8 November 1944	110400	Crash near Bramsche after aerial combat, 100% damage	Major Walter Nowotny killed in action
8 November 1944	110404	Engine flameout during aerial combat with North American P-51 Mustang fighters, crashed near Quakenbrück, 100% damage	Oberleutnant Franz Schall bailed out
8 November 1944	170293	Blown tire on takeoff at Hesepe, 35% damage	Feldwebel Erich Büttner
8 November 1944	—	Aerial combat with North American P-51 Mustang fighters near Dümmer See, 100% damage	Oberfeldwebel Helmut Baudach bailed out
16 November 1944	—	unknown cause and location	

== Commanding officers ==
=== Gruppenkommandeure ===
• Major Walter Nowotny	16 October	–	8 November 1944
• Major Erich Hohagen	November	–	24 November 1944

=== 1. Staffel of Kommando Nowotny ===
• Oberleutnant Paul Bley	16 October	–	28 October 1944
• Hauptmann Georg-Peter Eder	28 October	–	24 November 1944

=== 2. Staffel of Kommando Nowotny ===
• Oberleutnant Alfred Teumer	25 September	–	4 October 1944
• Oberleutnant Franz Schall	16 October	–	24 November 1944

=== 3. Staffel of Kommando Nowotny ===
• Leutnant Joachim Weber	16 October	–	24 November 1944
