= Jagdgeschwader 7 =

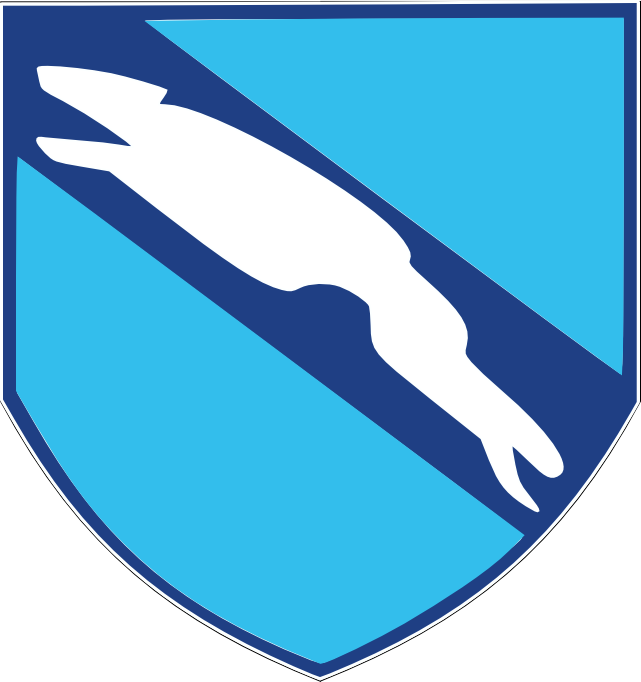
- Emblem of JG 7
- Active: 1944–45
- Country: Nazi Germany
- Branch: Luftwaffe
- Type: Fighter Aircraft
- Role: Air superiority
- Size: Air Force Wing
- Nickname(s): Nowotny
- Patron: Walter Nowotny
- Fighter Aircraft: Me 262
- Engagements: Defense of the Reich

Commanders
- Notable commanders: Johannes Steinhoff (1.12.44 – 26.12.44); Theodor Weissenberger (1.1.45 – 8.5.45)

Aircraft flown
- Fighter: Me 262

Jagdgeschwader 7 (JG 7) Nowotny was a Luftwaffe fighter wing during World War II and the first operational jet fighter unit in the world. It was created late in 1944 and served until the end of the war in May 1945.

== Formation ==
In August 1944, the Oberkommando der Luftwaffe (OKL—Air Force High Command) ordered the formation JG 7. Initially it was planned to equip the Geschwader with the Focke-Wulf Fw 190 radial engine powered fighter, formation and preparation was intended to be done at Königsberg in der Neumark, present-day Chojna in northwestern Poland. Due to lack of pilots and aircraft, formation had to be postponed. In October, the plan was changed and the Geschwaderstab (headquarters unit) was to receive the Messerschmitt Bf 109 G-14 fighter. This plan also had to be abandoned and in November the OKL ordered the formation of JG 7 with three Gruppen (groups), all of which equipped with the new Messerschmitt Me 262 jet fighter. On 1 December, Oberstleutnat Johannes Steinhoff was given command of JG 7 which transferred to Brandenburg-Briest in early December.

The creation of I. Gruppe of JG 7 was initiated on 25 August 1944 by reequipping the former II. Gruppe of Kampfgeschwader 1 "Hindenburg" (KG 1—1st Bomber Wing) with Fw 190 aircraft which was cancelled due to lack of resources. The OKL then ordered the detachment of the Gruppe which was then subordinated to Jagdgeschwader 3 "Udet" (JG 3—3rd Fighter Wing), becoming JG 3's new II. Gruppe while at the same time the former II. Gruppe of JG 3 became the new I. Gruppe of JG 7. This Gruppe was then placed under the command of Hauptmann Theodor Weissenberger which was based at Kaltenkirchen. The first formation of II. Gruppe of JG 7 was also ordered on 25 August. The idea was to transfer the disbanded II. Gruppe KG 1 and equip them with the Fw 190 fighter. Like I. Gruppe of JG 7, the plan was changed on 24 November and the Gruppe became the IV. Gruppe of Jagdgeschwader 301 (JG 301—301st Fighter Wing). On 12 January 1945, the General der Jagdflieger (General of Fighters) made a second attempt at creating a II. Gruppe of JG 7 and placed under the command of Major Hermann Staiger. III. Gruppe of JG 7 was formed from the remnants of Kommando Nowotny (Kdo. Nowotny—Commando Nowotny) on 24 November at Lechfeld Airfield under the command of Major Erich Hohagen. Kdo. Nowotny had been formed on 26 September 1944 under the command of Major Walter Nowotny to evaluate and establish tactics for the newly developed Me 262 jet fighter. Following Nowotny's death on 8 November, the Kommando was withdrawn from combat operations and its pilots sent to Ergänzungs-Jagdgeschwader 2, a replacement training unit at Lechfeld Airfield, for further training. On 19 November, remnants of Kdo. Nowotny was redesignated at Lechfeld Airfield to III. Gruppe of JG 7 and ordered to Brandenburg-Briest where they joined the Geschwaderstab of JG 7.

== Operational history ==
III./JG 7 was the only element of JG 7 ready to operate against the Allies. Throughout its existence JG 7 suffered from an irregular supply of new aircraft, fuel and spares. With such a radically new aircraft, training accidents were also common, with 10 Me 262s being lost in six weeks. Additionally, JG 7 operated Bf-109Gs. These Bf-109Gs likely operated as top cover for the Me-262s during takeoff and landing, as was common practice for other Luftwaffe jet units, such as Jagdverband 44. However, the numbers and exact usage of JG 7's Bf-109Gs are unknown, as there is no Luftwaffe documentation regarding these BF-109Gs. The allies captured Bf-109Gs with the same markings as JG 7's Me-262s, the blue and red tail band, but this does not confirm the Bf-109Gs purpose.

The technical troubles and material shortages meant initial tentative sorties were only in flight strength, usually no more than 4 or 6 aircraft. Flying from Brandenburg-Briest, Oranienburg and Parchim, the Geschwader flew intermittently against the USAAF bomber formations. On 3 February JG 7 intercepted USAAF bomber formations and 5 bombers were claimed shot down.

By the end of February 1945 JG 7 had claimed around 45 four-engined bombers and 15 fighters, but at this stage of war this success rate had no effect whatsoever on the Allied air offensive.

During March JG 7 began to deliver larger scale attacks against the Allied bombers. 3 March saw 29 sorties for 8 kills claimed (one jet was lost). On 18 March III./JG 7 conducted their biggest attack numerically thus far, some 37 Me 262s engaging a force of 1,200 American bombers and 600 fighters. This action also marked the first use of the new, unguided R4M rockets. 12 bombers and 1 fighter were claimed for the loss of 3 Me 262s.

The total numbers of aircraft shot down by JG 7 is difficult to quantify due to the loss of Luftwaffe records; between 136 and 420 Allied aircraft may have been claimed shot down.

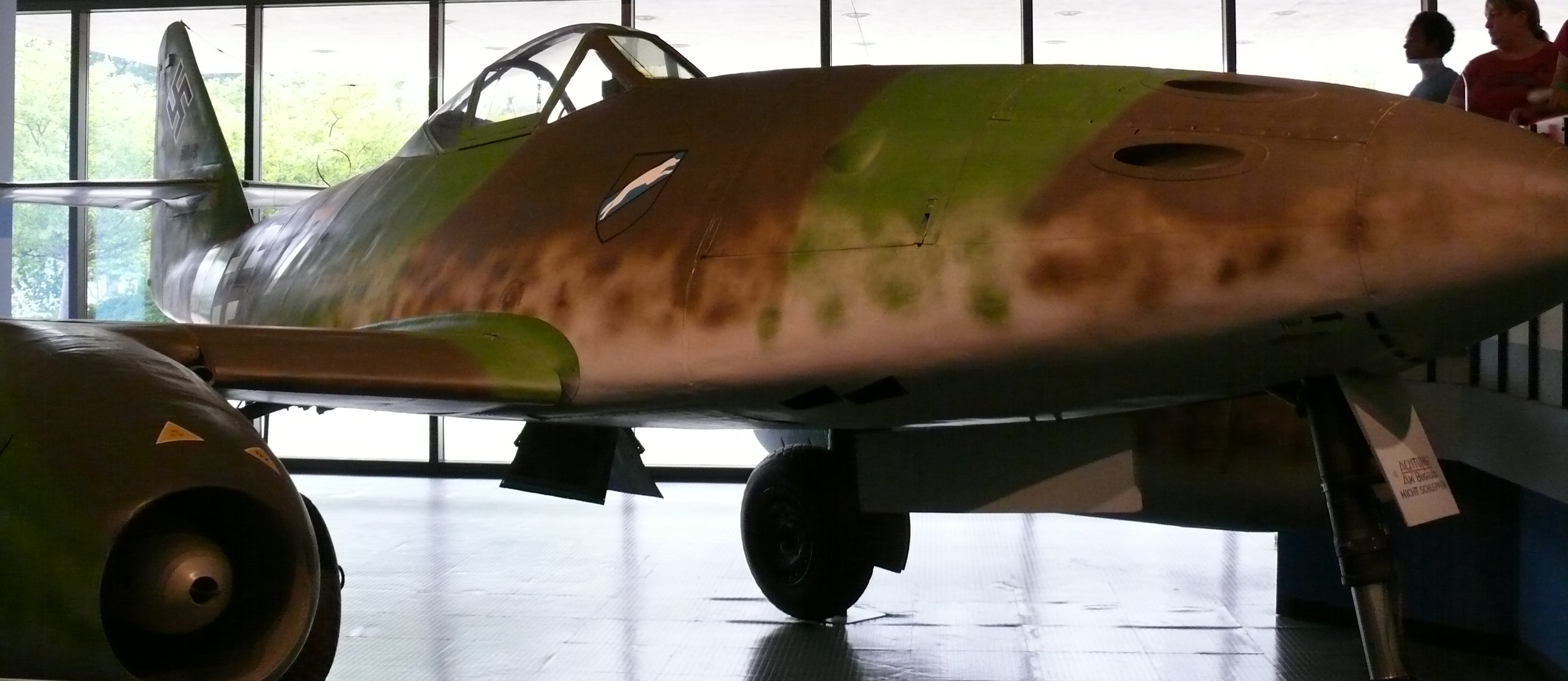
The NASM's Me 262A displaying JG 7's Windhund (Sighthound) emblem

=== March 1945 ===
- Sunday, 18 March 1945: Some 37 Me 262s engaged some 1,330 U.S. heavy bombers and over 700 fighters of the USAAF 8th Air Force destined for Berlin, known as "Mission 894" by the Americans, with some bombing undertaken using H2X radar due to inclement weather over the target area. The Me 262s were equipped for the first time with 24 of the new R4M air-to-air rockets. JG 7 claimed 12 bombers and one fighter though U.S. records indicate only eight heavy bombers lost. III./JG 7 lost three jet fighters in return. I./JG 7 was forced to takeoff in bad weather and lost Hans Waldmann in a mid-air collision with Hans-Dieter Weihs, and Günter Schrey following combat with U.S. fighters.
- 21 March 1945: JG 7 claimed 13 B-17s shot down (6 8th Air Force heavy bombers were lost to all causes).4 Me 262s were lost.
- 22 March 1945: 27 Me 262's of II./JG 7, led by Major Theodor Weissenberger, attacked B-17s over Leipzig. Weissenberger and Oberfeldwebel Heinz Arnold each claimed a B-17 downed of the 12 bombers claimed shot down by the unit (10 were lost by the 15th Air Force formation).
- 23 March 1945: Heavy bombers of the USAAF 15th Air Force attacked refineries at Ruhland, where fuel production ceased completely after the attack. The Luftwaffe countered this attack with 14 jet fighters claiming two confirmed and one probable victories during the course of 11 aerial combat over Chemnitz. Major Heinrich Ehrler was credited with two B-24s destroyed and Oberfeldwebel Reinhold a B-17 probably destroyed. American sources confirm these claims to attacking Me 262s in the area of operations.
- 24 March 1945: JG 7 intercepted a bomber formation of the 15th Air force and claimed 10 four-engined bombers.(US archives record only one of the 15th AF bombers was lost). JG 7 lost 4 Me 262s in return, to the escort fighters( who in turn claimed 8 Me 262s)
- 25 March 1945: JG 7 accurately claimed five B-24s shot down, although 5 Me 262s were lost from 25 sorties dispatched.
- 31 March 1945: 19 four-engined bombers and two fighters and the probable destruction of another bomber recorded a level of success which was never to be exceeded.

About 20 Me 262s of I. Gruppe and 7 of III. Gruppe took off during the early morning to intercept 460 RAF and RCAF Lancasters and Halifaxes bombing Hamburg, (including the RCAF units of No. 419 Squadron (Moose), No. 434 Squadron (Bluenose), No. 408 Squadron (Goose), No. 415 Squadron (Swordfish) and No. 425 Squadron (Alouette)).

Oberleutnant Sturm, Oberleutnant Hans Grünberg (2), Leutnant Todt (2), Leutnant Schenk (2), Oberleutnant Franz Schall (2), Fähnrich Ehrig (2), Leutnant Hans-Dieter Weihs (1 probable) and Flieger Gerhard Reiher had achieved 13 aerial victories without loss.

The days victory total was raised by at least six during the afternoon when Oberleutnant Stehle led a formation against one of the numerous Lancaster formations. The Staffelkapitän of 2./JG 7 Fritz Stehle shot down a Lancaster near Osnabrück. 11. Staffel and the Stabsschwarm engaged the 8th Air Force in the Zeitz, Brandenburg and Braunschweig areas. American records show the loss of 3 B-17s, 2 B-24s and 4 P-51s mostly to Me 262s. It is believed that Major Weissenberger, Oberfähnrich Windisch and Oberfeldwebel Pritzl each destroyed a B-17. Major Ehrler and Leutnant Rudolf Rademacher probably accounted for a Mustang each.

=== April 1945 ===
On 7 April JG 7 flew 59 sorties, the largest number in one day, though most failed to engage the Allies. The jets claimed five Allied aircraft destroyed for the loss of two of their own.

On 7 April 1945 elements of III./JG 7 and I.(J)/KG 54 (totaling some 60 Me 262s) were sent to intercept the fighter escorts accompanying 1,261 bombers over Northern Germany, while the 180-strong fighter formation of Sonderkommando Elbe attacked the bomber forces. The jets claimed some 18 victories but over 60 of the Bf 109 force was destroyed along with 27 Me 262s almost half of those committed. Some 19 pilots were killed or missing, while five were wounded. U.S. losses from all causes were 19 bombers and 8 escort fighters.

=== May 1945 ===
At 16:00 on 8 May 1945 fighters of the JG 7 fought the last aerial battle of World War II in Europe. At about 15:20 Oberleutnant Fritz Stehle and his wingman took off on Me 262 to intercept Soviet Yak-9 fighters and came upon the surprised enemy over Freiberg. Stehle claimed a Yak-9 but the plane shot down was probably an Airacobra. Actually Soviet records show that two P-39 - piloted by M.Lt Sergey Stepanov of 129 GIAP and Aleksey Ivanyuk of 152 GIAP - had been lost. Stehle's victory was anyway the last aerial victory by a German fighter pilot in World War II.

== Commanding officers ==
- Oberstleutnant Johannes Steinhoff, November 1944 – 26 December 1944
- Major Theodor Weissenberger, 1 January 1945
- Major Rudolf Sinner (acting), 19 February 1945

=== I. Gruppe of JG 7 ===
- Hauptmann Gerhard Bäker, August 1944
- Major Theodor Weissenberger, 25 November 1944
- Major Erich Rudorffer, 14 January 1945
- Oberleutnant Fritz Stehle (acting), April 1945
- Major Wolfgang Späte, April 1945

=== II. Gruppe of JG 7 ===
- Major Hermann Staiger, 12 January 1945
- Hauptmann Lutz-Wilhelm Burckhardt, February 1945
- Major Hans Klemm, 15 April 1945 – 8 May 1945

=== III. Gruppe of JG 7 ===
- Major Erich Hohagen, 19 November 1944
- Major Rudolf Sinner, 1 January 1945
- Hauptmann Johannes Naumann, 5 April 1945

=== IV. Gruppe of JG 7 ===
- Oberstleutnant Heinrich Bär, 3 May 1945

== See also ==
Organization of the Luftwaffe during World War II
