= Alfred Teumer =

German World War II flying ace

- Born: 11 February 1918; Neustadt am Rübenberge
- Died: 4 October 1944 (aged 26); Hesepe near Osnabrück
- Burial place: Bramsche, Evangelical Cemetery
- Military career
- Allegiance: Nazi Germany
- Branch: Luftwaffe
- Service years: 1934–1944
- Rank: Hauptmann (captain)
- Units: JG 54, Kdo Nowotny
- Commands: 5./JG 54, 2./JG 54, 7./JG 54, 2./Kdo Nowotny
- Conflicts: World War II
- Awards: Knight's Cross of the Iron Cross

Alfred Teumer (11 February 1918 – 4 October 1944) was a German Luftwaffe military aviator and fighter ace during World War II. He is credited with 76 aerial victories claimed in over 300 combat missions. This figure includes 66 aerial victories on the Eastern Front, and further ten claims over the Western Allies.

Born in Neustadt am Rübenberge, Teumer grew up in the Weimar Republic and Nazi Germany. In December 1941, he was posted to Jagdgeschwader 54 (JG 54—54th Fighter Wing) which was fighting on the Eastern Front. Flying with this wing, Teumer claimed his first aerial victory on 28 December 1941 during the Siege of Leningrad. Teumer was appointed Staffelkapitän (squadron leader) of 5. Staffel (5th squadron) of JG 54 in April 1943. He then commanded the newly created 10. Staffel of JG 54 before he was wounded in combat on 3 September 1943. Following his recovery, he was given command of 2. Staffel of JG 54 in December 1943. In April 1944, Teumer was transferred to 7. Staffel of JG 54 which was fighting in Defense of the Reich on the Western Front. On 19 August 1944, Teumer was awarded the Knight's Cross of the Iron Cross for 76 aerial victories claimed. He was then transferred to Kommando Nowotny, an experimental unit flying the Messerschmitt Me 262 jet fighter. Teumer was killed in a flying accident on 4 October 1944 at Hesepe airfield when his Me 262 suffered engine failure during the landing approach.

== Career ==
Teumer was born on 11 February 1918 in Neustadt am Rübenberge in the Province of Hanover of the German Empire. Following completion of flight and fighter pilot training, (Note: Flight training in the Luftwaffe progressed through the levels A1, A2 and B1, B2, referred to as A/B flight training. A training included theoretical and practical training in aerobatics, navigation, long-distance flights and dead-stick landings. The B courses included high-altitude flights, instrument flights, night landings and training to handle the aircraft in difficult situations.) he was posted to 3. Staffel (3rd squadron) of Jagdgeschwader 54 (JG 54—54th Fighter Wing) on 2 December 1941 during the final days of Operation Barbarossa holding the rank of Leutnant. At the time, 3. Staffel was temporarily commanded by Oberleutnant Max-Hellmuth Ostermann, who was substituting for Oberleutnant Hans Schmoller-Haldy. The Staffel was subordinated to Gruppe (1st group) of JG 54 headed by Hauptmann Erich von Selle and was based at Krasnogvardeysk, present-day Gatchina. The Gruppe fought in the northern sector of the Eastern Front in the aerial battles of the Siege of Leningrad.

=== War against the Soviet Union ===
On 28 December 1941, I. Gruppe flew combat air patrols along the Volkhov where German ground forces were retreating fighting against the Volkhov Front. During these missions, Teumer claimed his first aerial victory when he shot down a Petlyakov Pe-2 bomber. On 5 January 1942, command of I. Gruppe was given to Hauptmann Franz Eckerle when Selle was transferred. Teumer claimed his second aerial victory on 9 January over a I-26 fighter, an early war German designation for the Yakovlev Yak-1. That day, the Gruppe again flew missions in support of the Heer (army) along the Volkhov in the combat area southeast of Leningrad near Tosno. Two days later, flying over the same combat area, Teumer was credited with two I-18 fighters shot down, a reference to the Mikoyan-Gurevich MiG-1 fighter aircraft. The fighting along the Volkhov continued in the second half of January, predominately in the area between Leningrad and Shlisselburg. On 26 January, Teumer claimed his fifth aerial victory when he shot down a Pe-2 bomber. Then on 30 January, Teumer made an emergency landing in his Messerschmitt Bf 109 F-2 (Werknummer 9685—factory number) at Chudovo, damaging the aircraft to 40%. On 14 February, Eckerle was killed in action and command of I. Gruppe went to Hauptmann Hans Philipp. In early March, the Gruppe supported the German 18th Army which was fighting in the Battle of Lyuban. In these battles, Teumer claimed a Curtiss P-40 Warhawk fighter on 5 March. The next day, he was credited with another P-40 fighter and an I-18 fighter shot down.

On 9 February 1943, Teumer's Bf 109 G-2 (Werknummer 10321) was hit by anti-aircraft artillery and suffered engine failure, resulting in a forced landing at Sologubowka, approximately 70 kilometers (43 miles) southeast of Saint Petersburg. Teumer was appointed Staffelkapitän (squadron leader) of 5. Staffel of JG 54 in April 1943. He replaced Hauptmann Paul Steindl who was transferred. On 20 June, the creation of a newly formed IV. Gruppe (4th group) of JG 54 was ordered. Its first commander was Hauptmann Erich Rudorffer. Teumer was tasked with the creation of 10. Staffel in July, a squadron of IV. Gruppe. When Rudorffer was transferred on 1 August, Teumer was briefly tasked with leading the Gruppe until its new commander, Hauptmann Rudolf Sinner, took command on 14 September. On 3 September, he was wounded in aerial combat flying a Bf 109 G-6 northwest of Gatchina. He was replaced Oberleutnant Robert Weiß as commander of 10. Staffel while command of IV. Gruppe briefly went to Oberleutnant Siguurd Haala. During his convalescence, Teumer was awarded the German Cross in Gold (Deutsches Kreuz in Gold) on 17 October. After his recovery, he took command of 2. Staffel of JG 54 from Oberleutnant Otto Vinzent in December 1943. On 14 February, I. Gruppe moved to an airfield named Wesenberg near Rakvere, located approximately 60 kilometers (37 miles) north of Lake Peipus and 105 kilometers (65 miles) west of Narva. Here the Gruppe was subordinated to the 3. Flieger-Division (3rd Air Division) and fought in the Battle of Narva.

=== Western Front ===
Combat box of a 12-plane B-17 squadron. Three such boxes completed a 36-plane group box.: 1. Lead Element; 2. High Element; 3. Low Element; 4. Low Low Element

In April 1944, Teumer was transferred to 7. Staffel of JG 54. He took command of the Staffel from Oberleutnant Rudolf Klemm who had been wounded in aerial combat on 9 April. The Staffel was subordinated to III. Gruppe led by Major Werner Schröer. At the time, the Gruppe was based at Lüneburg Airfield and subordinated to 2. Jagd-Division (2nd Fighter Division) fighting in Defence of the Reich. On 20 April, III. Gruppe relocated to Landau an der Isar for conversion training to the Focke-Wulf Fw 190. In consequence of this relocation, the Gruppe came under the control of 7. Jagd-Division (7th Fighter Division). Conversion training was relatively short and the Gruppe flew its first mission on the Fw 190 against attacking United States Army Air Forces (USAAF) heavy bombers on 19 May. That day, Teumer was credited with an Herausschuss (separation shot)—a severely damaged heavy bomber forced to separate from its combat box which was counted as an aerial victory—over a Consolidated B-24 Liberator bomber. The Gruppe flew further missions on 22, 24, 25, 27, 28 and 29 May. On 24 May, Teumer was credited with shooting down a Boeing B-17 Flying Fortress bomber followed by another Herausschuss over a B-17 bomber on 27 May.

When Allied forces launched Operation Overlord, the invasion of German-occupied Western Europe on 6 June, III. Gruppe was immediately ordered to relocate to Villacoublay Airfield. That day, the Gruppe reached Nancy, arriving in Villacoublay the following day where it was subordinated to II. Fliegerkorps (2nd Air Corps). Its primary objective was to fly fighter-bomber missions in support of the German ground forces. The Gruppe flew its first missions on 7 June to the combat area east of Caen and the Orne estuary. Teumer claimed his first aerial victory in this combat area on 8 June when he shot down a USAAF North American P-51 Mustang fighter. Two days later, he was shot down in aerial combat near the Orne estuary. He managed to bail out of his Fw 190 A-8 ZY (Werknummer 730384) but was wounded in the encounter. In July, the Gruppe supported the German forces fighting in the Battle of Saint-Lô and the combat area near Paris predominantly under the control of Jagdgeschwader 26 "Schlageter" (JG 26—26th Fighter Wing). In these battles, Teumer claimed a Lockheed P-38 Lightning fighter on 26 July. In early August, combat shifted to Avranches, Mortain and Falaise. On 8 and 9 August, Teumer was credited with two further P-38 fighters shot down, one on each of these dates.

On 16 August, III. Gruppe was withdrawn from the front and sent to München Gladbach, present-day Mönchengladbach, for a period of rest and replenishment. There, Teumer was awarded the Knight's Cross of the Iron Cross (Ritterkreuz des Eisernen Kreuzes) on 19 August 1944 for 76 aerial victories claimed. During this period, Teumer served as acting Gruppenkommandeur (group commander) of III. Gruppe until 17 September. Teumer, who was childhood friend of Martin Drewes, took command of 2. Staffel of Kommando Nowotny, flying the Messerschmitt Me 262 jet fighter. The unit was named after Major Walter Nowotny and was tasked with testing the Me 262 under operational conditions. Teumer, who had received some training on the Me 262 at Rechlin, was killed in a flying accident on 4 October 1944 at Hesepe airfield. His Me 262 A-1a (Werknummer 170044) had suffered engine failure during the landing approach.

== Summary of career ==
=== Aerial victory claims ===
According to US historian David T. Zabecki, Teumer was credited with 76 aerial victories. Spick also lists him with 76 aerial victories, 66 of which on the Eastern Front and ten on the Western Front, claimed in over 300 combat missions, and a mission-to-claim ratio of 3.95. Mathews and Foreman, authors of Luftwaffe Aces — Biographies and Victory Claims, researched the German Federal Archives and found records for 74 aerial victory claims. This figure includes 67 aerial victories on the Eastern Front and seven over the Western Allies, including three four-engined bombers.

Victory claims were logged to a map-reference (PQ = Planquadrat), for example "PQ 00283". The Luftwaffe grid map (Jägermeldenetz) covered all of Europe, western Russia and North Africa and was composed of rectangles measuring 15 minutes of latitude by 30 minutes of longitude, an area of about 360 square miles (930 km^{2}). These sectors were then subdivided into 36 smaller units to give a location area 3 km × 4 km (1.9 mi × 2.5 mi) in size.

Chronicle of aerial victories
This and the ♠ (Ace of spades) indicates those aerial victories which made Teumer an "ace-in-a-day", a term which designates a fighter pilot who has shot down five or more airplanes in a single day. This along with the * (asterisk) indicates an Herausschuss (separation shot)—a severely damaged heavy bomber forced to separate from his combat box which was counted as an aerial victory. This and the ? (question mark) indicates information discrepancies listed by Prien, Stemmer, Rodeike, Bock, Mathews and Foreman.
Claim	Date	Time	Type	Location	Claim	Date	Time	Type	Location
– 3. Staffel of Jagdgeschwader 54 – Eastern Front — 6 December 1941 – 30 April 1942
1	28 December 1941	10:45? (Note: According to Matthews and Foreman claimed at 10:43.)	Pe-2		5	26 January 1942	13:20	Pe-2	
2	9 January 1942	15:20	I-26 (Yak-1)		6	5 March 1942	11:55	P-40	
3	11 January 1942	15:02	I-18 (MiG-1)		7	6 March 1942	17:17	P-40	
4	11 January 1942	15:06	I-18 (MiG-1)		8	6 March 1942	17:22	I-18 (MiG-1)	
– 1. Staffel of Jagdgeschwader 54 – Eastern Front — 1 May 1942 – 3 February 1943
9	2 September 1942	12:23? (Note: According to Matthews and Foreman claimed at 12:22.)	Yak-1	PQ 00283; 20 km (12 mi) west of Mga	16♠	14 January 1943	08:08	Yak-1	PQ 10191 east of Mga
10	12 January 1943	10:55	Il-2	PQ 10251; 15 km (9.3 mi) west-southwest of Shlisselburg	17♠	14 January 1943	12:20	I-16	PQ 00292; 10 km (6.2 mi) southwest of Mga
11	12 January 1943	11:02	Il-2	PQ 0024	18♠	14 January 1943	12:22	I-16	PQ 00292; 10 km (6.2 mi) southwest of Mga
12	12 January 1943	12:45	Yak-1	PQ 00253; 15 km (9.3 mi) west-southwest of Shlisselburg	19	27 January 1943	11:27	LaGG-3	PQ 00263; 10 km (6.2 mi) southwest of Shlisselburg
13	12 January 1943	12:48	Yak-1	PQ 00432; 10 km (6.2 mi) southwest of Mga	20	27 January 1943	14:10	MiG-3	PQ 10153 southeast of Shlisselburg
14♠	14 January 1943	07:57	Yak-1	PQ 10232 vicinity of Mga	21	27 January 1943	14:20	LaGG-3	PQ 10162 southeast of Shlisselburg
15♠	14 January 1943	07:59	Yak-1	PQ 10174 vicinity of Mga					
– 1. Staffel of Jagdgeschwader 54 – Eastern Front — 4 February – April 1943
22	9 February 1943	09:34	P-40	PQ 36 Ost 10181 east of Mga	26	20 March 1943	09:10	Il-2	PQ 36 Ost 00414; 10 km (6.2 mi) east of Pushkin
23	16 March 1943	09:07	LaGG-3	PQ 35 Ost 18223; 25 km (16 mi) east-southeast of Staraya Russa	27	23 March 1943	08:05	Yak-1	PQ 36 Ost 00334; Pushkin
24	16 March 1943	14:10	LaGG-3	PQ 35 Ost 18219; 20 km (12 mi) east-southeast of Staraya Russa	28? (Note: This claim is not listed by Prien, Stemmer, Rodeike and Bock.)	8 April 1943	14:26	LaGG-3	10 km (6.2 mi) east of Pushkin
25	19 March 1943	17:14? (Note: According to Matthews and Foreman claimed at 17:04.)	I-16	PQ 36 Ost 00414; 10 km (6.2 mi) east of Pushkin	29	8 April 1943	14:27	LaGG-3	PQ 36 Ost 00413; 10 km (6.2 mi) east of Pushkin
– 5. Staffel of Jagdgeschwader 54 – Eastern Front — May – July 1943
30	4 May 1943	06:00	La-5	PQ 36 Ost 20474; 40 km (25 mi) south-southeast of Volkhov	34	30 May 1943	20:20	P-40	PQ 36 Ost 10162 southeast of Shlisselburg
31	26 May 1943	19:25	La-5	PQ 26 Ost 81141; Gulf of Finland, north of Hungerburg	35	1 June 1943	05:09	LaGG-3	PQ 36 Ost 20153 southwest of Volkhov
32	27 May 1943	19:53	LaGG-3	PQ 36 Ost 20153 southwest of Volkhov	36	7 July 1943	16:27	I-153	PQ 36 Ost 21893
33	27 May 1943	19:55	LaGG-3	PQ 36 Ost 20114 west of Volkhov					
– 10. Staffel of Jagdgeschwader 54 – Eastern Front — August – 3 September 1943
37	17 August 1943	14:37	Yak-9	Leningrad	42	27 August 1943	17:02	Il-2	PQ 36 Ost 00173; 10 km (6.2 mi) north of Selo
38	19 August 1943	10:33	LaGG-3	PQ 36 Ost 10473; 25 km (16 mi) northeast of Lyuban	43	29 August 1943	17:58	La-5	PQ 36 Ost 00411; 10 km (6.2 mi) east of Pushkin
39	19 August 1943	16:27	I-16	PQ 36 Ost 10141 south of Shlisselburg	44	31 August 1943	17:48	La-5	PQ 36 Ost 00272; 15 km (9.3 mi) northeast of Pushkin
40	21 August 1943	11:42	Il-2	PQ 36 Ost 00264; 10 km (6.2 mi) southwest of Shlisselburg	45	2 September 1943	16:32	La-5	PQ 26 Ost 90164; 10 km (6.2 mi) southwest of Lomonosov
41	21 August 1943	18:17	Il-2	PQ 36 Ost 10114 vicinity of Shlisselburg	46	3 September 1943	16:57	Pe-2	PQ 36 Ost 00444; 10 km (6.2 mi) southeast of Slutsk
– 2. Staffel of Jagdgeschwader 54 – Eastern Front — December 1943 – April 1944
47	15 December 1943	09:45	La-5	PQ 35 Ost 06341	58	7 February 1944	10:25	La-5	PQ 35 Ost 05134
48	16 December 1943	09:42	La-5	PQ 25 Ost 96494 north of Gorodok	59	24 February 1944	15:12	Yak-9	PQ 26 Ost 80712; 20 km (12 mi) south of Narva
49	16 December 1943	12:02	Il-2	PQ 35 Ost 06521	60	25 February 1944	10:23	Yak-9	PQ 26 Ost 70694; 15 km (9.3 mi) southwest of Narva
50	16 December 1943	12:03	Il-2	PQ 35 Ost 06522	61	26 February 1944	15:00? (Note: According to Matthews and Foreman claimed at 15:08.)	Il-2	PQ 26 Ost 60674; Gulf of Finland, southwest of Kunda
51	23 December 1943	11:48	Il-2	PQ 35 Ost 06763	62	26 February 1944	15:29	Il-2	PQ 26 Ost 60591 southwest of Kunda
52	4 January 1944	09:58	Il-2	PQ 25 Ost 96561; 20 km (12 mi) southwest of Gorodok	63	26 February 1944	15:31	Yak-1	PQ 26 Ost 60592 southwest of Kunda
53	8 January 1944	09:33	La-5	PQ 35 Ost 06711	64	2 April 1944	11:43	Yak-9	PQ 26 Ost 70452; Baltic Sea, northwest of Hungerburg
54	8 January 1944	09:35	La-5	PQ 25 Ost 96692; 20 km (12 mi) south of Gorodok	65	2 April 1944	15:33	LaGG-3	PQ 26 Ost 70433; Baltic Sea, 40 km (25 mi) northeast of Kunda
55	8 January 1944	09:40	La-5	PQ 35 Ost 06884	66	3 April 1944	17:12	Yak-9	PQ 26 Ost 70273; Baltic Sea, 65 km (40 mi) northeast of Kunda
56	8 January 1944	12:55	Il-2	PQ 35 Ost 06583	67	4 April 1944	09:42	La-5	PQ 26 Ost 60481 northeast of Kunda
57	12 January 1944	08:45	La-5	PQ 35 Ost 06877					
– 7. Staffel of Jagdgeschwader 54 – Western Front — May – August 1944
68	19 May 1944	13:21	B-24*	PQ 15 Ost JB south of Wittingen	72	26 July 1944	14:55	P-38	PQ 04 Ost N/BA-2; Le Merlerault
69	24 May 1944	11:57	B-17	PQ 15 Ost DD 2 Prignitz Heath	73	8 August 1944	14:31	P-38	PQ 15 Ost S/BT-4; Mortain
70	27 May 1944	12:19	B-17*	PQ 15 Ost DP; Elzach/Black Forest	74	9 August 1944	13:32	P-38	PQ 14 Ost N/AU-5; Falaise
71	8 June 1944	06:27	P-51	PQ 15 West S/TU-9/2; Dives-sur-Mer					

=== Awards ===
- Iron Cross (1939) 2nd and 1st Class
- Honor Goblet of the Luftwaffe on 12 April 1943 as Oberleutnant and pilot
- German Cross in Gold on 17 October 1943 as Oberleutnant in the VI./Jagdgeschwader 54
- Knight's Cross of the Iron Cross on 19 August 1944 as Oberleutnant and Staffelkapitän of the 7./Jagdgeschwader 54 (Note: According to Scherzer as Staffelkapitän in the III./Jagdgeschwader 54.)
