= Achmer Aerodrome =

Achmer Airport Flugplatz Achmer
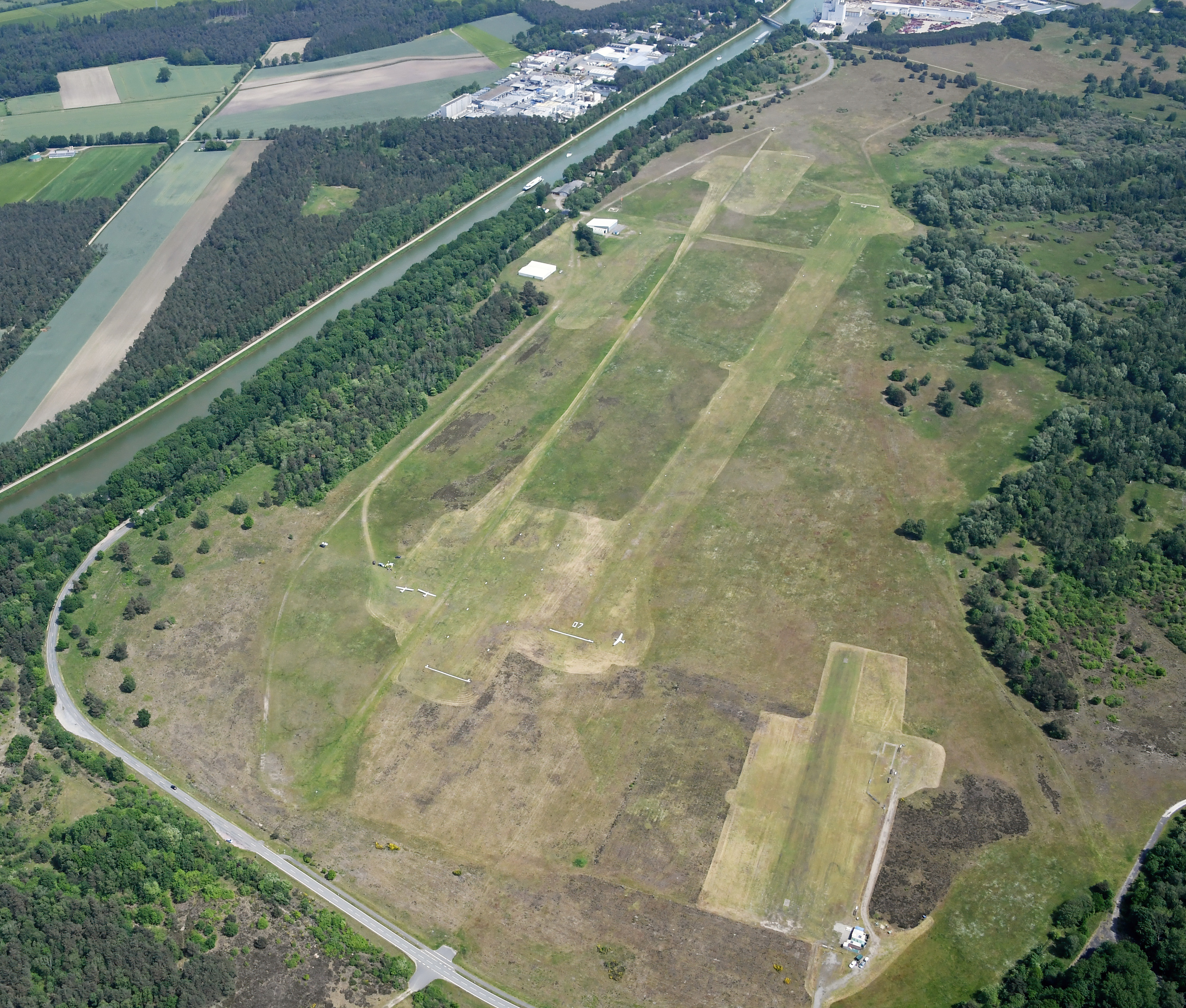
- IATA: none; ICAO: EDXA

Summary
- Operator: Osnabrücker Verein für Luftfahrt e.V.
- Location: Bramsche, Lower Saxony, Germany
- Elevation AMSL: 177 ft / 54 m
- Coordinates: 52°22.65′N 007°54.81′E

Map
- Location of airport in Lower Saxony, Germany

Runways
Direction	Length		Surface
Direction	m	ft	Surface
07/25	940	2,297	Grass
- Source: Osnabrücker Verein für Luftfahrt e.V.

Achmer Airport (German: Flugplatz Achmer) (ICAO: EDXA) is a regional airport located 4 km (2 nautical miles) southwest of Bramsche, a town in the district of Osnabrück in Lower Saxony, Germany. It supports general aviation with no commercial airline service scheduled.

== History ==
During World War II, the airport was used by the German Luftwaffe and after their withdrawal also by British Royal Air Force as Advanced Landing Ground B-110 Achmer.

== Facilities ==
The airport resides at an elevation of 177 feet (54 m) above mean sea level. It has a grass runway designated 07/25 which measures 940 by 30 metres (3,084 ft × 98 ft).

== See also ==
- Transport in Germany
- List of airports in Germany
