= Parchim International Airport =

Coordinates: 53°25′43″N 11°46′55″E

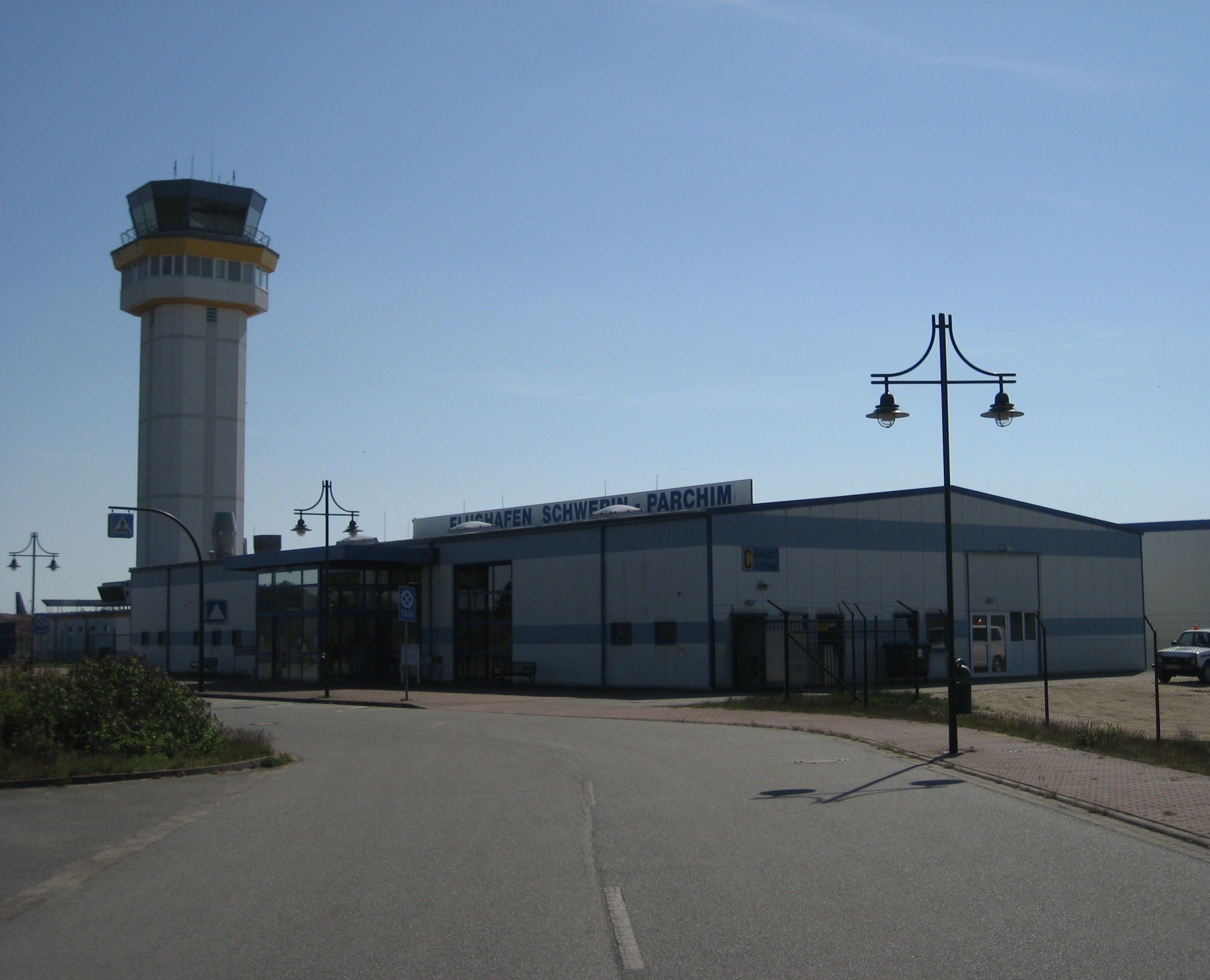
- IATA: SZW; ICAO: EDOP

Summary
- Serves: Parchim and Schwerin, Germany
- Elevation AMSL: 166 ft / 51 m
- Website: parchim-airport.com
- Interactive map of Parchim International Airport

Parchim International Airport (IATA: SZW, ICAO: EDOP) is an unscheduled airport in North-Eastern Germany, serving Schwerin and Parchim in the west of Mecklenburg-Vorpommern.

== History ==
Originally a Third Reich-era Luftwaffe air force base, hosting the pioneering JG 7 jet fighter wing before May 1945, it saw scheduled cargo flights operated by Air Cargo Germany in 2009 and 2010. As of June 2015, a Chinese investor wanted to extend logistic operations. However its subsequent role has been the storage of surplus airliners, predominantly Airbus models formerly registered in China.
