= Ergänzungs-Jagdgeschwader =

Luftwaffe training unit

Replacement Fighter Wing
- Ergänzungs-Jagdgeschwader
- Country: Nazi Germany
- Branch: Luftwaffe

A Ergänzungs-Jagdgeschwader (EJG) were Luftwaffe replacement training units which were part of a larger operational Jagdgeschwader. The Germans were sometimes forced to undertake operations and training simultaneously. In 1944, the Luftwaffe formed two of these units, EJG 1 and EJG 2, by combining various training and experimental units. Its commanders included Viktor Bauer and Werner Andres.

== Ergänzungs-Jagdgeschwader 1 ==
The Geschwader EJG 1 was formed in early 1944 from Ergänzungs-Jagdgruppe West, Ergänzungs-Jagdgruppe Nord and Ergänzungs-Jagdgruppe Ost. The Geschwaderstab (headquarters unit) was based in Märkisch Friedland, present-day Mirosławiec in Poland, while the Staffeln (squadrons) were based on airfields in Pomerania, Brandenburg, Lausitz, present-day Lusatia, and Silesia. Initially, the unit was conceived as a training unit for fighter pilots. The deteriorating war situation forced Luftwaffe training units into combat operations. In January 1945, an Einsatzgruppe, an operational combat group, was created and deployed on the Oder where they fought in the Vistula–Oder offensive. In March/April 1945, the unit was disbanded and its pilots were assigned to other Jagdgeschwader.

== Ergänzungs-Jagdgeschwader 2 ==
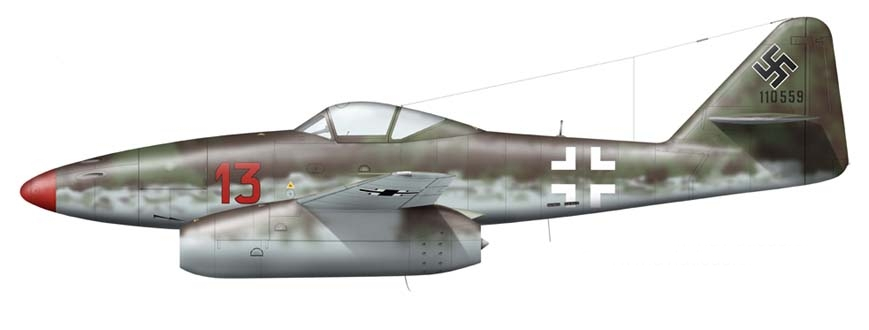
Me 262 A-1a – EJG 2 flown by Bär

In late 1944, EJG 2 was formed from various Erprobungskommandos, experimental test units, primarily for conversion training to the Messerschmitt Me 262 jet fighter, the Messerschmitt Me 163 rocket fighter and Heinkel He 162 jet fighter. The Geschwaderstab was based at Sprottau, present-day Szprotawa in western Poland. The unit had been formed with three Gruppen (groups). I. Group was equipped with the Messerschmitt Bf 109 and Focke-Wulf Fw 190 piston engine fighters and based at airfields northwest of Berlin. II. Gruppe, a "blind" or bad weather flying unit, was located at Ludwigslust. III. Gruppe was equipped with the Me 262 jet aircraft and was based at Lechfeld Airfield. The Geschwader was led by Major Werner Andres. On 13 February 1945, Oberstleutnant Heinrich Bär was given command of III. Gruppe. On 23 April, Bär relocated III. Gruppe of EJG 2 to Munich-Riem Airfield where Jagdverband 44 (JV 44—44th Fighter Detachment), led by the former General der Jagdflieger Adolf Galland, was based. There, III./EJG 2 was disbanded and its pilots assigned to JV 44.
