= Erprobungskommando =

Variety of Luftwaffe special-purpose unit

An Erprobungskommando (EKdo) ("Testing-command") was a variety of Luftwaffe special-purpose unit tasked with the testing of new aircraft and weaponry under operational conditions. Similarly-named Erprobungs-prefixed squadron (staffel) and group (gruppe) sized units also existed at various times in the Luftwaffe during 1939-1944 to service-test new designs, usually numbered with the RLM aircraft designation system airframe number matching the aircraft they were meant to test, with the three digit number following the "8-xxx" RLM airframe number designating the unit, as with Erprobungsstaffel 177 (contracted to E-Staffel 177), charged with testing the A-0 production prototypes of the Heinkel He 177A heavy bomber. The similarly-prefixed Erprobungsgruppe 210 was meant to have service-tested the Messerschmitt Me 210 twin-engined "destroyer" and light bomber, but that design's early aerodynamic problems caused the unit's transformation and expansion into SKG 210, a dedicated "fast bomber" unit using Bf 110s instead.

== Kommandos ==
=== Erprobungskommando 16 ===
Erprobungskommando 16 was formed March 1943 in Peenemünde-West, as a test unit for the new Messerschmitt Me 163 rocket fighter, and later based at the Luftwaffe airfield in Bad Zwischenahn for a considerable period of time. The unit was disbanded on 14 February 1945.

==== Commanding officers ====
- Major Wolfgang Späte, February 1943 – May 1944
- Hauptmann Toni Thaler, May 1944 – February 1945

=== Erprobungskommando 154 ===
Erprobungskommando 154 was formed in November 1943 in Langenhagen, to test the new Focke-Wulf Ta 154 night fighter.

=== Erprobungskommando 162 ===
Erprobungskommando 162 was formed in January 1945 in Rechlin-Roggenthin, to test the new Heinkel He 162 jet fighter.

==== Commanding officers ====
- Major Heinrich Bär, January 1945 – May 1945

=== Erprobungsgruppe 210 ===
Erprobungsgruppe 210 was formed on 1 July 1940 in Köln-Ostheim, to test the Messerschmitt Bf 109 and Bf 110 in a ground attack role. On 24 April 1941 the unit was redesignated I./Schnellkampfgeschwader 210.

==== Commanding officers ====
- Hauptmann Walter Rubensdörffer, 1 July – 15 August 1940
- Hauptmann Hans von Boltenstern, 24 August – 4 September 1940
- Hauptmann Martin Lutz, 7–27 September 1940
- Oberleutnant Werner Weymann (Acting-Gruppenkommandeur) -5 October 1940 (KIA)
- Major Wilhelm-Otto Lessmann, 1 November 1940 – April 1941

=== Erprobungskommando 262 ===
Erprobungskommando 262 was formed in April 1944 at Lechfeld Air Base to test the new Messerschmitt Me 262. The unit was disbanded on 26 September 1944 and used to form Kommando Nowotny.

==== Commanding officers ====
- Hauptmann Werner Thierfelder, April 1944 – 18 July 1944
- Major Walter Nowotny, 19 July 1944 – 26 September 1944

=== Kommando Welter ===
Kommando Welter was initially formed in November 1944 in Burg bei Magdeburg as Kommando Stamp, flying the Me 262A-1a, as an experimental nightfighter unit, but was soon renamed Kommando Welter. The unit was redesignated 10. Staffel of Nachtjagdgeschwader 11 on 25 January 1945.

==== Commanding officers ====
- Oberleutnant Gerhard Stamp, November 1944
- Oberleutnant Kurt Welter (for whom the unit was named), November 1944 – January 1945

=== Zirkus Rosarius ===
Zirkus Rosarius (also known as the Wanderzirkus Rosarius) was an Erprobungskommando-style special test unit of the Luftwaffe, specifically of the Luftwaffe High Command, tasked with testing captured British and American aircraft, all of which were repainted in German markings.
