= Kurt Welter =

German World War II fighter pilot (1916–1949)

- Kurt Welter
- Born: 25 February 1916; Cologne-Lindenthal, German Empire
- Died: 7 March 1949 (aged 33); Leck, Allied-occupied Germany
- Military career
- Allegiance: Nazi Germany
- Branch: Luftwaffe
- Service years: 1934–1945
- Rank: Oberleutnant (first lieutenant)
- Units: JG 301, JG 300, NJGr 10, Kdo Stamp, Kdo Welter and NJG 11
- Commands: Kdo Welter, 10./NJG 11
- Conflicts: World War II: Defense of the Reich
- Awards: Knight's Cross of the Iron Cross with Oak Leaves

Kurt Welter (25 February 1916 – 7 March 1949) was a German Luftwaffe fighter ace and the most successful Jet Expert of World War II. (Note: For a list of Luftwaffe jet aces see List of German World War II jet aces) A flying ace or fighter ace is a military aviator credited with shooting down five or more enemy aircraft during aerial combat. He claimed a total of 63 aerial victories—that is, 63 aerial combat encounters resulting in the destruction of the enemy aircraft—achieved in 93 combat missions. He recorded 56 victories at night, including 33 Mosquitos, and scored more aerial victories from a jet fighter aircraft than anyone else in World War II and possibly in aviation history. However this score is a matter of controversy; research of Royal Air Force losses suggests Welter overclaimed Mosquito victories considerably. Against this, Luftwaffe claims were very strict, requiring confirmation and proof by witnesses: The remains of aircraft shot down and crashed would be verifiable and recorded on the ground in the sector claimed.

Welter was born in Cologne-Lindenthal on 25 February 1916. He joined the military service of the Luftwaffe in 1934 and was trained as a pilot. He showed a strong natural ability as a pilot and was subsequently selected for flight instructor training and served many years as a flight instructor. In 1943 Welter transferred to an operational night fighter unit flying contemporary piston engine fighter aircraft. On 18 October 1944, after 40 combat missions, Welter was awarded the Knight's Cross of the Iron Cross. In early 1945, Welter transferred to an experimental jet night fighter unit flying the Messerschmitt Me 262. On 11 March 1945 he was awarded the Knight's Cross of the Iron Cross with Oak Leaves for 48 aerial victories. Welter survived the war and was killed in an accident at a railroad crossing on 7 March 1949.

== Early life and career ==
Welter was born on 25 February 1916 in Cologne-Lindenthal. He was the son of merchant Julius Welter and his wife Gertrud, née Morian. On 29 February, he was baptised into the Catholic Church with the full name of Kurt Johann Franz Ludwig Welter. The family moved to Brühl where Welter Volksschule on 1 April 1922. On 1 April 1929, he transferred to the boys school St. Antonius in Aachen, graduating from this school on 1 April 1930. On 1 May 1930, Welter attended the private Rohloff merchant school (see August Rackow) in Cologne from which he graduated on 31 March 1931. In parallel, he worked in his father's company. According to Streetly, Welter was a member of the Nazi Party.

On 1 April 1931, Welter started his merchant apprenticeship with the Cologne-based sales office of the Lausitzer Glaswerke AG, a manufacturer of glass. In parallel, he attended the Berufsschule (vocational school) and finished his vocational education on 31 March 1934. Welter then joined the Landespolizei (state police) on 1 October 1934. On 23 May 1935, he volunteered for 4 1/2 years of military service in the Luftwaffe of which his service with the Landespolizei was accounted for. He first served with the staff of the Neubrandenburg Airfield and was made a Gefreiter (lance corporal) on 1 November 1935. On 26 September 1936, Welter signed up for 12 years and was accepted for flight service.

From December 1936 to September 1937, Welter served with Fliegerersatzabteilung 27 (27th Flier Replacement Unit) at Halberstadt where was promoted to Unteroffizier (subordinate officer or sergeant) on 1 April 1937. On 1 October, he was posted to the student company of Flugkommando Berlin (Berlin Flight Commando) and in December to the 2. Company of the Flugzeugführerschule A/B 21 (FFS A/B 21—flight school for the pilot license) in Magdeburg. (Note: Flight training in the Luftwaffe progressed through the levels A1, A2 and B1, B2, referred to as A/B flight training. A training included theoretical and practical training in aerobatics, navigation, long-distance flights and dead-stick landings. The B courses included high-altitude flights, instrument flights, night landings and training to handle the aircraft in difficult situations.) From Magdeburg, he was transferred to Flugzeugführerschule A/B 51 (FFS A/B 51—flight school) based at Nohra near Weimar. There, he completed his Pilot Badge (Flugzeugführerabzeichen) on 7 May 1938. On 31 October 1938, Welter was awarded the Wehrmacht Long Service Award 4th Class (Wehrmacht-Dienstauszeichnung 4. Klasse) for four years of service. At the time, he was assigned to the Fliegerersatzabteilung 13 (13th Flier Replacement Unit) which in later 1938 became Fliegerersatzabteilung 51 (51st Flier Replacement Unit) both based in Nohra.

== World War II ==
World War II in Europe had begun on Friday, 1 September 1939, when German forces invaded Poland. At the time, Welter served with Flieger-Ausbildungsregiment 71 (71st Flight Training Regiment) which was based in Sorau, present-day Żary, and Guben, now the Cottbus-Drewitz Airport. Flieger-Ausbildungsregiment 71 was subordinated to the Flugzeugführerschule A/B 3 (FFS A/B 3—flight school) where Welter served as a flight instructor.

On 19 March 1940, Welter was transferred to Flieger-Ausbildungs-Regiment 63 (63rd Flight Training Regiment) which was based in Marienbad, present-day Mariánské Lázně, as an instructor. There, he was promoted to Feldwebel (sergeant) on 1 August 1940. In November, Welter married Ingrid Katharina Emma Green. The marriage produced two children, a daughter and a son. For his service as a flight instructor, he was awarded the War Merit Cross 2nd Class with Swords (Kriegsverdienstkreuz zweiter Klasse mit Schwertern) on 23 March 1941. In June 1942, he transferred to Flugzeugführerschule A/B 121 (FFS A/B 121—flight school) at Straubing. Here, Welter was promoted to the rank of Oberfeldwebel (staff sergeant) on 1 October 1942 and again served as a flight instructor until 10 August 1943 when he was transferred to Blindflugschule 10 (school for instrument flight training) in Altenburg. At Altenburg, he also received his pilot license for night flying (Blindflugschein), required for flying night fighter missions.

=== Night fighter career ===
A map of part of the Kammhuber Line. The 'belt' and night fighter 'boxes' are shown.

Following the 1939 aerial Battle of the Heligoland Bight, Royal Air Force (RAF) attacks shifted to the cover of darkness, initiating the Defence of the Reich campaign. By mid-1940, Generalmajor (Brigadier General) Josef Kammhuber had established a night air defense system dubbed the Kammhuber Line. It consisted of a series of control sectors equipped with radars and searchlights and an associated night fighter. Each sector named a Himmelbett (canopy bed) would direct the night fighter into visual range with target bombers. In 1941, the Luftwaffe started equipping night fighters with airborne radar such as the Lichtenstein radar. This airborne radar did not come into general use until early 1942.

On 2 September 1943, Welter was transferred to 5. Staffel (5th squadron) of Jagdgeschwader 301 (JG 301—301st Fighter Wing), a night fighter squadron that experimented with the use of largely radar-less single-seat Focke-Wulf Fw 190 A-5 and Fw 190 A-6 fighter aircraft by night, often equipped with the FuG 350 Naxos radar detector, used in the form of German night-fighter operations without AI radar — due to Düppel interference from RAF Bomber Command aircraft. These free ranging interception operations were called Wilde Sau (wild boar). On his first Wilde Sau intercept mission against Allied bombers on the night of 22/23 September 1943, Welter claimed two Allied four-engine bombers shot down in the vicinity of Hanover. He shot down two further bombers on his third mission on the night of 3/4 October 1943. That night, he was credited with the destruction of two Handley Page Halifax bombers near Kassel.

The 30. Jagddivision (30th Fighter Division) submitted Welter for a preferential promotion to Leutnant (second lieutenant) on 7 January 1944. The recommendation was approved and as of 1 February 1944, Welter served as an officer. By the beginning of April, he had accumulated 17 victories in only 15 missions. Subsequently, on 10 May 1944 Welter was awarded the German Cross in Gold (Deutsches Kreuz in Gold). Welter was transferred to 5. Staffel of Jagdgeschwader 300 (JG 300—300th Fighter Wing) on 7 July 1944.

In July, Welter claimed two United States Army Air Forces (USAAF) Boeing B-17 Flying Fortress four-engined bombers and three North American P-51 Mustangs, two of which claimed on 19 July between Munich and Memmingen, shot down by day. From 25 July 1944, Welter served with 1. Staffel of Nachtjagdgruppe 10 (NJGr 10) performing further Wilde Sau missions. On the night of 25/26 August, Welter claimed his first de Havilland Mosquito twin-engine bomber shot down. That night, the RAF did not report the loss of a Mosquito over Germany. However, the combat report of No. 692 Squadron of that night shows that Mosquito serial MM140 on its mission to bomb Berlin came under attack by a Messerschmitt Bf 109 which hit the starboard wing, bursting the tire. Although the Mosquito returned to England, the aircraft crash landed at RAF Woodbridge and was damaged beyond repair. Welter then claimed four RAF Avro Lancaster four-engine heavy bombers shot down on the night of 29/30 August 1944. All four victories were claimed west of Stettin, two of which were not confirmed.

Welter transferred to 10. Staffel of JG 300 on 4 September 1944. 10. Staffel of JG 300 was established to counter intrusions by the RAF's fast Mosquito twin-engined bombers, flying specially optimized for speed Bf 109 G-6/AS fighters. In September, Welter claimed seven Mosquitos downed, including one by ramming. It is thought that during his service with 1./NJG 10 and 10./JG 300, Welter recorded 12 victories in only 18 missions. The ramming incident occurred on 13 September when Welter attacked and collided or deliberate rammed Mosquito serial MM280 near Salzwedel. The Mosquito managed to fly back to Allied territory and made a forced landing near Brussels-Melsbroek Airfield, destroying the aircraft.

On the night of 19 September 1944, according to Hinchliffe, Welter may have shot down Wing Commander Guy Gibson who was leading a 300-bomber attack on Mönchengladbach and Rheydt. Gibson's Mosquito crashed near Steenbergen in the Netherlands. Welter was the only German pilot to have claimed a Mosquito. The claim is unlikely. Welter submitted his victory claim north of Wittenberg in eastern Germany, some hundreds of miles away from the place Gibson's Mosquito was found. Recent research suggests that his victim was Mosquito VI serial PZ177 of No. 23 Squadron RAF which was shot down at 8,000 metres (26,000 ft) west of Bad Münder, Holzminden. The crew, F/O. K. Eastwood and Navigator F/L. G.G. Rogers were both killed. Welter was awarded the Knight's Cross of the Iron Cross (Ritterkreuz des Eisernen Kreuzes) on 18 October 1944 for 33 victories in just 40 missions.

=== Flying the Messerschmitt Me 262 ===
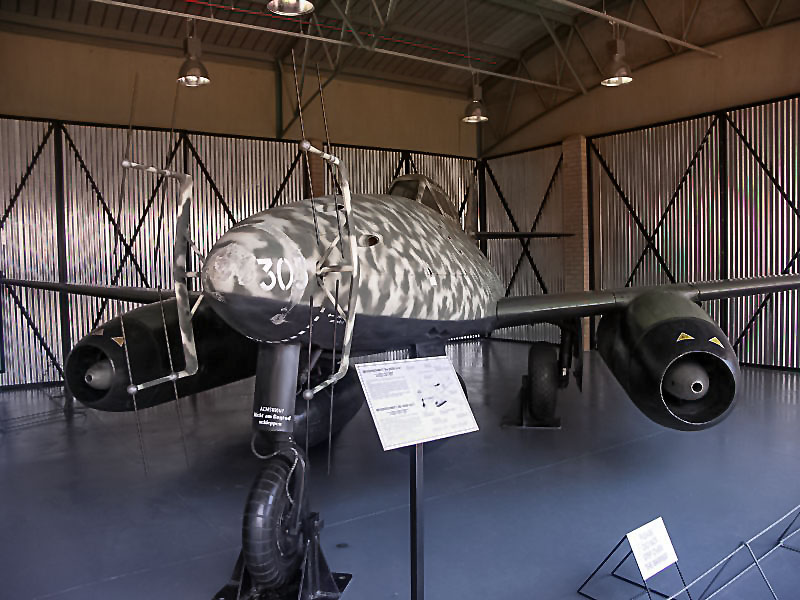
Neptun radar-equipped Me 262B-1a/U1 in the South African National Museum of Military History.

On 2 November 1944, Welter was transferred to II. Gruppe of Nachtjagdgeschwader 11 (NJG 11), a reformation of his former unit. Here he was given command of a special Kommando subordinate to II./NJG 11, set up on 11 November 1944 at Erprobungsstelle Rechlin's southern Lärz airbase (2 November 1944 – 28 January 1945), and dedicated to performing nocturnal interception with the Messerschmitt Me 262 jet fighter of RAF Mosquitos attacking the Berlin area. Welter was promoted to Oberleutnant (first lieutenant) on 1 December 1944.

According to some sources, Welter added a Lancaster to his growing list of Mosquitos on the night of 12 December 1944, the first night victory by a jet fighter. Other sources state that his first aerial victory flying the Me 262 was claimed either on the night of 2 January 1945 or 5 January 1945. On 15 December, Welter recruited Feldwebel Karl-Heinz Becker whom he had known from their mutual tenure with FFS A/B 121. On 28 January 1945, the unit initially known as Sonderkommando Stamp, named after its founder Major Gerhard Stamp and then Sonderkommando Welter, was re-designated 10. Staffel of NJG 11 and transferred to the airfield at Burg near Magdeburg (28 January 1945 – 12 April 1945). The unit was equipped with Me 262 jet fighters, and tasked with intercepting Mosquito bomber aircraft of No. 8 Group RAF in the Berlin area. The Me 262 were not fitted with radar and used the aid of ground control and the searchlight defences, partially a Wilde Sau form of night combat. Welter had claimed three aerial victories while flying the Me 262 by early February 1945.

Thereafter, Welter made a string of questionable air combat claims against Mosquito aircraft in the Berlin area – three on the night of 21 February 1945 (no Mosquitoes recorded lost), and another three on the night of 2 March 1945 (one Mosquito damaged in aerial combat). 10./NJG 11 made further claims against Mosquito aircraft attacking Berlin on the nights of 21 March 1945 (three claims; one Mosquito lost), 23 March 1945 (three claims; one Mosquito lost, another damaged in aerial combat), 24 March 1945 (two claims; one Mosquito damaged in aerial combat), 27 March 1945 (two claims; two Mosquitos lost), 30 March 1945 (four claims; one Mosquito lost and another damaged in aerial combat), 2 April 1945 (one claim; one Mosquito lost), 3 April 1945 (two claims; one Mosquito lost and another damaged in aerial combat), and 19 April 1945 (two claims, no Mosquitos lost). The last known aerial combat claim by Welter occurred on the night of 3 April 1945, when a Mosquito of No. 139 Squadron RAF, was shot down over Berlin. Welter was awarded the Knight's Cross of the Iron Cross with Oak Leaves (Ritterkreuz des Eisernen Kreuzes mit Eichenlaub) on 11 March 1945 for 48 victories.

In early May 1945, 10./NJG 11 relocated to Schleswig Airfield, its last relocation before the German surrender. There, Welter was taken prisoner of war by British forces and interrogated by the RAF. The RAF published two reports which contained information regarding the use of the Me 262 in a night fighter role. The first "Report on G.A.F. Night Fighter System" does not mention Welter directly by name but rather refers to him as "Commander of the Me 262 Flight". A further report named "Report on G.A.F. Night Fighting from the interrogation of Prisoners" contains a detailed report of Welter's interrogation. In mid-1945, Welter was released from captivity.

== Later life and death ==
Following his release, Welter returned to the Rhineland where he lived in Badorf, part of Brühl. He initially worked for a sugar manufacturer and from 1 November 1946 to August 1948, he worked for a leather firm in Brühl. He then became managing director of Sanitätshaus Green, the medical supply store in Neustadt in Holstein which belonged to his father-in-law. Welter was killed on 7 March 1949 in Leck in Schleswig-Holstein waiting at a level crossing, when logs falling from an improperly loaded passing train crushed his car.

== Summary of career ==
=== Aerial victory claims ===
According to US historian David T. Zabecki, Welter was credited with 63 aerial victories and with 26 claims flying the Me 262 is the world's highest scoring jet-ace. Foreman, Mathews and Parry, authors of Luftwaffe Night Fighter Claims 1939 – 1945, list 58 nocturnal victory claims, numerically ranging from 1 to 59, omitting the tenth claim. In addition to the nocturnal victory claims, authors Lorant and Goyat of Jagdgeschwader 300 "Wilde Sau" list five further day-time claims. Mathews and Foreman, authors of Luftwaffe Aces — Biographies and Victory Claims, also researched the German Federal Archives and found records for over 49 aerial victories, plus seven further unconfirmed claims. This number of confirmed aerial victories were all claimed on the Western Front and includes 43 by night and two four-four engine bombers by day. The authors list him 16 aerial victories claimed while flying the Me 262.

Victory claims were logged to a map-reference (PQ = Planquadrat), for example "PQ 14 Ost N/NB". The Luftwaffe grid map (Jägermeldenetz) covered all of Europe, western Russia and North Africa and was composed of rectangles measuring 15 minutes of latitude by 30 minutes of longitude, an area of about 360 square miles (930 km^{2}). These sectors were then subdivided into 36 smaller units to give a location area 3 km × 4 km (1.9 mi × 2.5 mi) in size.

Chronicle of aerial victories
This and the – (dash) indicates unconfirmed aerial victory claims for which Welter did not receive credit. This and the ? (question mark) indicates information discrepancies listed by Heaton, Lewis, Lorant, Goyat, Matthew, Foreman and Parry.
| Claim (total) | Claim (nocturnal) | Date | Time | Type | Location | Serial No./Squadron No. |
– 5. Staffel of Jagdgeschwader 301 –
| 1 | 1 | 22 September 1943 | 23:04 | Lancaster | Hannover | |
| 2 | 2 | 22 September 1943 | 23:12 | B-24 Liberator | Hannover | |
| 3 | 3 | 3 October 1943 | 22:29 | Handley Page Halifax | southwest Kassel | |
| 4 | 4 | 3 October 1943 | 22:41 | Halifax | east-southeast Kassel | |
– II. Gruppe of Jagdgeschwader 301 –
| 5 | 5 | 22 October 1943 | 21:04 | four-engined bomber | 4 km (2.5 mi) northwest Kassel | |
| 6 | 6 | 22 October 1943 | 21:14 | four-engined bomber | 18 km (11 mi) north Kassel | |
| 7 | 7 | 22 October 1943 | 21:24 | four-engined bomber | 28 km (17 mi) north Kassel | |
– 5. Staffel of Jagdgeschwader 301 –
| 8 | 8? (Note: According to Mathews and Foreman, Luftwaffe Aces — Biographies and Victory Claims, this claim is unconfirmed.) | 2 January 1944 | 02:55 | four-engined bomber | west Berlin | |
| 9 | 9? | 5 January 1944 | 03:46 | four-engined bomber | west Stettin | |
| 10 | — (Note: This unconfirmed claim is not listed in Luftwaffe Night Fighter Claims 1939 – 1945.) | 11 January 1944 | 04:11 | four-engined bomber | west of Stettin | |
| 11 | 11? | 28/29 January 1944 | — | Halifax | Berlin | |
| 12 | 12 | 20 February 1944 | 03:27 | Lancaster | Berlin | |
| 13 | 13 | 20 February 1944 | 04:16 | Lancaster | Leipzig | |
| 14 | 14? | 18/19 March 1944 | — | Lancaster | | |
| 15 | 15? | 18/19 March 1944 | — | Lancaster | | |
| 16 | 16? | 24/25 March 1944 | — | Lancaster | near Berlin | |
| 17 | 17 | 24 March 1944 | 22:44 | Lancaster | near Berlin | |
– 5. Staffel of Jagdgeschwader 300 –
| 18? (Note: According to Lorant and Goyat this claim is unconfirmed.) | | 18 July 1944 | 10:47 | P-51 Mustang | PQ 14 Ost N/NB, Füssen-Forggensee | |
| 19 | | 18 July 1944 | 10:55 | P-51 | near Schongau | |
| 20 | | 19 July 1944 | 09:37 | P-51 | PQ 14 Ost N/EA-2, Ottobeuren | |
| 21 | | 19 July 1944 | 09:43 | B-17 Flying Fortress | PQ 14 Ost N/DB-3, Lechfeld | |
| 22 | | 20 July 1944 | 11:15 | B-17 | PQ 15 Ost S/OE-5, Greiz-Reichenbach | |
– 10. Staffel of Jagdgeschwader 300 –
| 23 | 18 | 26 August 1944 | 00:38 | Mosquito | PQ FF, Friesack-Falkenrehde near Nienburg | Mosquito MM140/No. 692 Squadron RAF |
| 24 | 19? | 30 August 1944 | 02:05 | Lancaster | PQ BJ-CJ, Pasewalk-Greifenhagen/Ueckermünde-northwest of Stettin | |
| 25 | 20 | 30 August 1944 | 02:10 | Lancaster | PQ BJ-CJ, Pasewalk-Greifenhagen/Ueckermünde-northwest of Stettin | Lancaster PB131/No. 115 Squadron RAF |
| 26 | 21 | 30 August 1944 | 02:12 | Lancaster | PQ BJ-CJ, Pasewalk-Greifenhagen/Ueckermünde-northwest of Stettin | Lancaster PD273/No. 12 Squadron RAF |
| 27 | 22? | 30 August 1944 | 02:15 | Lancaster | PQ BJ-CJ, Pasewalk-Greifenhagen/Ueckermünde-northwest of Stettin | |
| 28 | 23 | 11 September 1944 | 22:58 | Mosquito | PQ FG-4, 15 km (9.3 mi) east of Nauen | Mosquito KB227/No. 139 Squadron RAF |
| 29 | 24 | 12 September 1944 | 23:14? (Note: According to Mathews and Foreman claimed at 23:10.) | Mosquito | PQ GG-2-3, Berlin-Dahlem-Tempelhof; Hopsten-Bramsche | |
| 30 | 25 | 12 September 1944 | 23:25 | Mosquito | PQ GM-GD, Angern; Tangerhütte | |
| 31 | 26 | 16 September 1944 | 02:03 | Mosquito | PQ 15 Ost S/GG-2, Berlin-Dahlem south Berlin | |
| 32 | 27 | 16 September 1944 | 02:30 | Mosquito | PQ 15 Ost S/GC-GB, Oebisfeld-Haldensleben/Wolfsburg; 5 km (3.1 mi) north Aachmer | |
| 33 | 28 | 18 September 1944 | 23:05 | Mosquito | PQ HF-JF, Lütte-Jüterbog/Jüterbog-Bergwitz north Wittenberg | Mosquito DZ635/No. 627 Squadron RAF |
| 34 | 29 | 6 October 1944 | 20:30 | Mosquito | Berlin | |
| 35 | 30 | 27/28 October 1944 | 01:20 | Mosquito | PQ FG-3, near Berlin | |
– II. Gruppe of Nachtjagdgeschwader 11 –
| 36 | 31 | 11/12 December 1944 | — | Mosquito? (Note: According to Heaton and Lewis claimed as an Avro Lancaster bomber.) | | Mosquito MM190/No. 128 Squadron RAF |
| 37 | 32? (Note: This claim is not listed by Mathews and Foreman in Luftwaffe Aces — Biographies and Victory Claims.) | 2/3 January 1945 | — | Mosquito | | Mosquito KB222/No. 139 Squadron RAF |
| 38 | 33? | 5/6 January 1945 | — | Mosquito | | |
| 39 | 34? | 10/11 January 1945 | — | Mosquito | | |
| 40 | 35? | 16/17 January 1945 | — | Lancaster | | |
| 41 | 36? | 16/17 January 1945 | — | Lancaster | | |
| 42 | 37 | 21/22 February 1945 | — | Mosquito | | |
| 43 | 38 | 21/22 February 1945 | — | Mosquito | | |
| 44 | 39 | 22/23 February 1945 | — | Mosquito | | |
| 45 | 40? | 22/23 February 1945 | — | Mosquito | | |
| 46 | 41 | 2/3 March 1945 | — | Mosquito | | |
| 47 | 42 | 2/3 March 1945 | — | Mosquito | | |
| 48 | 43? | 2/3 March 1945 | — | Mosquito | | |
| 49 | 44? | 6/7 March 1945 | — | Mosquito | | |
| 50 | 45? | 17/18 March 1945 | — | Mosquito | | |
| 51 | 46? | 17/18 March 1945 | — | Mosquito | | |
| 52 | 47 | 21 March 1945 | 21:38 | Mosquito | | |
| 53 | 48 | 21 March 1945 | 22:04 | Mosquito | | |
| 54 | 49 | 24/25 March 1945 | — | Mosquito | | |
| 55 | 50 | 27/28 March 1945 | — | Mosquito | | |
| 56 | 51 | 30/31 March 1945 | — | Mosquito | | |
| 57 | 52 | 30/31 March 1945 | — | Mosquito | | |
| 58 | 53 | 3/4 April 1945 | — | Mosquito | | |
| 59 | 54 | 10/11 April 1945 | — | Mosquito | | |
| 60 | 55 | 11/12 April 1945 | — | Mosquito | | Mosquito KB502/No. 163 Squadron RAF |
| 61 | 56 | 13/14 April 1945 | — | Mosquito | | Mosquito NT494/No. 85 Squadron RAF |
| 62 | 57 | 14/15 April 1945 | — | Mosquito | | |
| 63 | 58 | 15 April 1945 | — | Mosquito | | |
| 64 | 59 | 17/18 April 1945 | — | Mosquito | | |

=== Controversy over aerial victory claims ===
Much of the controversy surrounding Welter's claims for success in nocturnal aerial combat with the Me 262 stems from a memorandum written by Welter on 29 May 1945 for his British captors. In this memorandum Welter stated that between December 1944 and the end of January 1945, as the sole pilot of Kommando Welter, he flew seven Me 262 sorties and achieved three victories against Mosquito aircraft and two victories against Lancaster aircraft. Welter further stated that from the formation of 10./NJG 11 on 28 January 1945 to the end of the war, 10./NJG 11 flew around another 63 operational sorties and claimed a further 38 victories against Mosquito aircraft at night and five victories against Mosquito aircraft by day; his share being 20 Mosquitos at night and two during the day. Thus, according to the memo, a total of 25 Mosquitoes and two Lancasters were claimed in aerial combat by Welter, flying the Me 262 with the Kommando/Staffel, while other pilots of the Staffel claimed a further 21 kills (of which three were achieved with the two-seater Me 262). Official Luftwaffe documents show that by 4 April 1945, 10./NJG 11 had claimed 34 aerial victories, of which only one was claimed in a two-seater Me 262. (Note: According to Boiten and Mackenzie 2008, a radar-equipped Me 262B-1a/U1 two-seater night fighter, flown by Lt. Herbert Altner and his radar operator Unteroffizier Lommatsch, was first used operationally on the night of 27 March 1945, and was never flown in combat by Welter.) Research of RAF records show that at most 15 Mosquitoes could have been possibly destroyed by Kommando Welter—10./NJG 11.

Officially Kurt Welter was credited with 63 victories in 93 missions, of which 56 victories were achieved at night and seven by day. Among his claimed 63 victories are up to 33 Mosquitos. Thus, there remains some controversy about the exact number of victories achieved while flying the Me 262, with only three of the Mosquito kills coinciding with RAF records; the rest might be overclaiming.

=== Awards ===
- Wehrmacht Long Service Award 4th Class (31 October 1938)
- War Merit Cross 2nd Class with Swords (23 March 1941)
- Honour Goblet of the Luftwaffe (Ehrenpokal der Luftwaffe) on 24 April 1944 as Fahnenjunker-Oberfeldwebel and pilot (Note: According to Obermaier on 20 March 1944.)
- German Cross in Gold on 10 May 1944 as Fahnenjunker-Oberfeldwebel in the 5./JG 301
- Iron Cross (1939)
  - 2nd Class (5 October 1943)
  - 1st Class (28 October 1943)
- Knight's Cross of the Iron Cross with Oak Leaves
  - Knight's Cross on 18 October 1944 as Leutnant and pilot in the 10./JG 300 (Note: According to Fellgiebel and Von Seemen as Leutnant and pilot in the 2./NJG 11.)
  - 769th Oak Leaves on 11 March 1945 as Oberleutnant and Staffelkapitän of the 10./NJG 10
