= Karl-Heinz Becker (pilot) =

Luftwaffe jet pilot (1918–2006)

- Born: 30 December 1918
- Died: 20 April 2006 (aged 87)
- Military career
- Allegiance: Nazi Germany; West Germany
- Branch: Luftwaffe; German Air Force
- Service years: 1938–1945; 1956–1971
- Rank: Feldwebel (Technical Sergeant)
- Unit: II./NJG 11
- Conflicts: World War II: Defense of the Reich

Karl-Heinz Becker (30 December 1918 – 20 April 2006) was a Luftwaffe flying ace. He is credited with seven aerial victories flying the Messerschmitt Me 262 jet fighter, making him one of only 28 jet aces of World War II. Becker and his radio operator claimed six de Havilland Mosquitos in two weeks, two within three minutes of each other on the night of 23 March 1945.

== Career ==
Becker was born on 30 December 1918 and joined the military service of the Luftwaffe in 1938. In 1939, he attended the Kriegsschule (war academy) in Potsdam. Following flight training, (Note: Flight training in the Luftwaffe progressed through the levels A1, A2 and B1, B2, referred to as A/B flight training. A training included theoretical and practical training in aerobatics, navigation, long-distance flights and dead-stick landings. The B courses included high-altitude flights, instrument flights, night landings and training to handle the aircraft in difficult situations. For pilots destined to fly multi-engine aircraft, the training was completed with the Luftwaffe Advanced Pilot's Certificate (Erweiterter Luftwaffen-Flugzeugführerschein), also known as the C-Certificate.) Becker served as a flight instructor with the Flugzeugführerschule A/B 121 (FFS A/B 121—flight school for the pilot license) in Straubing. On 15 December 1944, he received a call from Oberleutnant Kurt Welter asking him to join Sonderkommando Welter. This unit was subordinated to II. Gruppe (2nd group) of Nachtjagdgeschwader 11 (NJG 11) based at Erprobungsstelle Rechlin's southern Lärz airbase. The Sonderkommando Welter was dedicated to performing nocturnal interception with the Messerschmitt Me 262 jet fighter of Royal Air Force (RAF) Mosquitos attacking the Berlin area.

On 17 December, Becker made his first training flight on the Me 262. Together with Welter in the instructor seat, he flew the Me 262 B-1a two-seat trainer variant. Following three further flights on the Me 262, he completed his conversion training the next day, having logged 37 minutes flight time. On 30/31 December, Sonderkommando Welter received four Me 262 A-1 single-seat fighter aircraft. Becker flew this variant for the first time on 20 January 1945 for 14 minutes, and again the following day, his first flights on the Me 262 since his initial training flights with Welter.

=== Flying the Messerschmitt Me 262 in combat ===
On 25 January 1945, Sonderkommando Welter was re-designated 10. Staffel (10th squadron) of NJG 11. The unit then transferred to the airfield at Burg near Magdeburg (28 January 1945 – 12 April 1945). Becker claimed his first aerial victory on 15 February over a F-5E, the aerial reconnaissance variant of the Lockheed P-38 Lightning. That day, First Lieutenant Ross Madden from 7th Photographic Group was on a mission to Berlin. Becker was ordered to take off at approximately 14:30 and vectored by a Jägerleitoffizier (fighter pilot control officer) to a point of intercept. Becker initially failed to find the P-38 and was already planning to return to Burg when he spotted the P-38 approximately 1,500 meters (4,900 feet) below left in a head-on direction. Becker went into a left, utilizing the superior speed of his Me 262 caught up to the P-38 from below and behind. He fired two short bursts into the F-5E (registration 44-24271) which exploded. Madden managed to bail out and was taken prisoner of war while Becker flew into the debris of the F-5E which damaged his left engine. The Jägerleitoffizier first instructed Becker to attempt a landing at Paderborn before recommending a landing at Münster-Handorf Airfield. Failing to find Münster-Handorf Airfield, Becker made a crash landing in a field, damaging his Me 262 (Werknummer 500075—factory number) further.

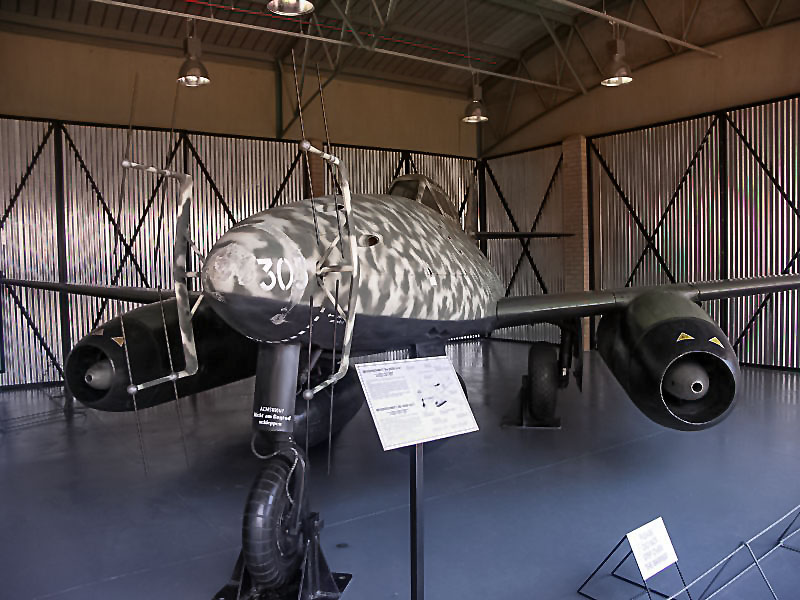
Neptun radar-equipped Me 262B-1a/U1 in the South African National Museum of Military History.

Becker claimed his first nocturnal and second overall aerial victory on the night of 21/22 March. That night, the RAF had sent 142 Mosquito twin-engined bombers to Berlin of which 20 aircraft belonged to No. 692 Squadron. Following their bomb run at 21:20, Becker intercepted the Mosquito PF392 in the area of Marienfelde and east of Potsdam at 21:32. The Mosquito crashed a little further south. The crew, Warrant Officer Ian Malcom MacPhee and Flight Sergeant Albert Victor Sullivan, were killed in action at Stangenhagen, present-day part of Trebbin. Two nights later, the RAF attacked Berlin with 65 Mosquitos. The 1. Jagd-Division (1st Fighter Division) countered this attack with three Me 262s from 10./NJG 11 which claimed two definite and one probable aerial victories, including two by Becker. Mosquito KB390 from No. 139 (Jamaica) Squadron very likely was shot down by Becker, the exact location is unknown. The navigator, Flight Lieutenant Norman Chesworth Berrisford, is buried on the Berlin 1939–1945 War Cemetery while the pilot, Flight Lieutenant Stanley Oliver Searles, remains missing in action. His second claim of the night may have been Mosquito KB367 also from No. 139 (Jamaica) Squadron which may have been damaged by Becker over Berlin before it crashed near Heesch in the Netherlands. The crew, pilot Flight Lieutenant Robert Ogilvie Day was killed and is buried at Heesch while the navigator Flight Lieutenant Thomas Treby is missing in action.

On the night of 24/25 March, Becker claimed his fifth aerial victory. The RAF had sent 67 Mosquitos to Berlin that night. His opponent could have been Mosquito MM133 from No. 692 Squadron which was hit by a 30 mm caliber round in the vertical stabilizer but managed to return to England. On the night of 27/28 March, Becker shot down Mosquito MM131 from No. 139 (Jamaica) Squadron north of Brandenburg an der Havel near Pessin. The pilot Flight Lieutenant Andreas Antonius Johannes van Amsterdam is missing in action while Squadron Leader Harry Forbes survived and was taken prisoner of war. Becker claimed his seventh and last aerial victory on the night of 30/31 March. His victim was Mosquito RV341 from No. 692 Squadron which crashed north-north west of Berlin. The crew, Flight Sergeant Walter Campey and Flight Sergeant Joseph Rabiner remain missing in action. Becker flew a mission on the night of 2/3 April without engaging in aerial combat. In early May 1945, 10./NJG 11 relocated to Schleswig Airfield, its last relocation before the German surrender. There Becker became a prisoner of war be British forces.

Following World War II, Becker joined the post-war German Air Force, at the time referred to as the Bundesluftwaffe, in 1956 and retired in March 1971. He was also interviewed several times and appeared on television programs related to air war over Germany. Becker died on 20 April 2006.

== Aerial victory claims ==
According to Aders, Becker was credited with seven nocturnal victories. Morgan and Weal list him with seven aerial victories flying the Me 262. This made him the second most successful Me 262 night fighter pilot. Foreman, Mathews and Parry, authors of Luftwaffe Night Fighter Claims 1939 – 1945, researched the German Federal Archives and found records for eight nocturnal victory claims. Mathews and Foreman also published Luftwaffe Aces — Biographies and Victory Claims, listing Becker with seven claims.

Victory claims were logged to a map-reference (PQ = Planquadrat), for example "PQ 15 Ost S/GG-5". The Luftwaffe grid map (Jägermeldenetz) covered all of Europe, western Russia and North Africa and was composed of rectangles measuring 15 minutes of latitude by 30 minutes of longitude, an area of about 360 square miles (930 km^{2}). These sectors were then subdivided into 36 smaller units to give a location area 3 km × 4 km (1.9 mi × 2.5 mi) in size.

Chronicle of aerial victories
This and the ? (question mark) indicates information discrepancies listed by Luftwaffe Night Fighter Claims 1939 – 1945, Luftwaffe Aces — Biographies and Victory Claims, and Heaton, Lewis and Zapf.
Claim	Date	Time	Type	Location	Serial No./Squadron No.
– 10. Staffel of Nachtjagdgeschwader 11 –
1	15 February 1945	15:46	P-38	5 km (3.1 mi) north of Spremberg	F-5E 44-24271/7th Photographic Group
2	21 March 1945	21:34	Mosquito	PQ 15 Ost S/GG-5; 10 km (6.2 mi) southwest of Berlin	Mosquito PF392/No. 692 Squadron RAF
3? (Note: This claim is not listed in Luftwaffe Night Fighter Claims 1939 – 1945 nor in Luftwaffe Aces — Biographies and Victory Claims.)	23 March 1945	23:50	Mosquito	PQ 15 Ost S/GG-2	Mosquito KB390/No. 139 Squadron RAF
4? (Note: This claim is not listed by Heaton and Lewis nor in Luftwaffe Night Fighter Claims 1939 – 1945 or Luftwaffe Aces — Biographies and Victory Claims.)	23 March 1945	23:53	Mosquito	PQ 15 Ost S/FG-8	Potentially Mosquito KB367 from No. 139 Squadron RAF which may have been damaged by Becker over Berlin before it crashed near Heesch in the Netherlands.
5	24 March 1945	21:32	Mosquito	PQ 15 Ost S/EF-8; 3 km (1.9 mi) south of Fehrbellin	Potentially Mosquito MM133 from No. 692 Squadron RAF which was hit by a 30 mm caliber round in the vertical stabilizer but managed to return to England.
6? (Note: This claim is not listed by Zapf.)	24 March 1945	21:32	Mosquito	3 km (1.9 mi) south of Fehrbellin	
7	27 March 1945	21:38	Mosquito	PQ 15 Ost S/FF-5; 10 km (6.2 mi) west of Nauen	Mosquito MM131/No. 139 Squadron RAF
8? (Note: This claim is not listed by Heaton and Lewis nor by Zapf.)	27 March 1945	21:38	Mosquito	10 km (6.2 mi) west of Nauen	
9? (Note: This claim is not listed by Heaton and Lewis nor in Luftwaffe Aces — Biographies and Victory Claims.)	30 March 1945	21:52	Mosquito	PQ 15 Ost S/FG-5	Mosquito RV341/No. 692 Squadron RAF
10? (Note: This claim is not listed by Zapf.)	31 March 1945	21:52	Mosquito	Tegel (Berlin)	
