= Friedrich-Karl Müller =

Friedrich-Karl Müller may refer to:

- Friedrich-Karl "Tutti" Müller, (1916 – 1944), German fighter pilot with JG 53 and JG 3
- Friedrich-Karl "Nasen" Müller, (1912 – 1987), German fighter pilot with KG z.b.V 172, KG 50, NJ Kdo, JG Hermann, JG 300, NJGr 10, NJG 11
