= Friedrich-Karl "Nasen" Müller =

German World War II fighter pilot

Friedrich-Karl Müller
- Born: 4 December 1911; Sulzbach, Germany
- Died: 2 November 1987 (aged 75); Germany
- Military career
- Allegiance: Nazi Germany
- Branch: Luftwaffe
- Service years: 1934–1945
- Rank: Major
- Nickname: Die Nase
- Units: KGz.b. V 172, KG 50, NJ Kdo, JG Hermann, JG 300, NJGr 10, NJG 11
- Commands: I./NJG 11
- Conflicts: World War II: Western Front
- Awards: Knight's Cross of the Iron Cross

Friedrich-Karl Müller — "Nasen-Müller" — (4 December 1911 – 2 November 1987) was a Luftwaffe night fighter ace during World War II. (Note: For a list of Luftwaffe night fighter aces see List of German World War II night fighter aces) He was a recipient of the Knight's Cross of the Iron Cross. The Knight's Cross of the Iron Cross, and its variants were the highest awards in the military and paramilitary forces of Nazi Germany during World War II.

== Early career ==
He first received flying training in 1934 and joined the German airline Deutsche Lufthansa. At the beginning of World War ΙΙ, Müller was posted to Kampfgruppe zur besonderen Verwendung 172 (KGr.z.b.V. 172—Fighting Group for Special Use) as a transport pilot flying the Junkers Ju 52. He was promoted to Feldwebel and assigned to 5. Staffel (5th squadron) of KG z.b.V. 172. After participating in the Invasion of Poland, in February 1940, Müller became an instructor at Blindflugschule 4 and promoted to Leutnant. He served with Blindflugschule 7 from September until December 1942, when he moved to I. Gruppe (1st group) of Kampfgeschwader 50 (KG 50—50th Bomber Wing) as Technical Officer, the unit being equipped with the new Heinkel He 177 heavy bomber.

== Night fighting ==
A map of part of the Kammhuber Line. The 'belt' and night fighter 'boxes' are shown.

Following the 1939 aerial Battle of the Heligoland Bight, bombing missions by the Royal Air Force (RAF) shifted to the cover of darkness, initiating the Defence of the Reich campaign. By mid-1940, Generalmajor (Brigadier General) Josef Kammhuber had established a night air defense system dubbed the Kammhuber Line. It consisted of a series of control sectors equipped with radars and searchlights and an associated night fighter. Each sector, named a Himmelbett (canopy bed), would direct the night fighter into visual range with target bombers. In 1941, the Luftwaffe started equipping night fighters with airborne radar such as the Lichtenstein radar. This airborne radar did not come into general use until early 1942.

In summer 1943, Müller joined Hajo Herrmann as part of the latter's experimental Wilde Sau single-engine night fighting unit Stab/Versuchskommando Herrmann. Herrmann considered Müller an ideal candidate for the role because of his blind flying instructing experience.

On the night of 3/4 July, Müller recorded his first Wilde Sau victory, a Halifax near Cologne. On the night of 22 October, Müller's fighter suffered engine failure, and he was slightly injured after baling out. In mid August Müller was appointed Technical Officer of Jagdgeschwader 300 (JG 300—300th Fighter Wing).

He claimed two victories on 11 August 1943, both Halifax bombers near Heidelberg. Two Lancasters was claimed near Swinemünde on 17 August 1943 and two Stirlings were claimed downed over Berlin on 24 August 1943. Müller then claimed a Lancaster SE of Munich on 7 September 1943. On the night of 8/9 October 1943 Müller claimed a Halifax northwest of Hannover. This was probably Halifax V LK900 "ZL-D" of No. 427 Squadron RCAF (piloted by Sgt FJ Kelly, the crew were all killed.)

By November 1943, Müller was Staffelkapitän of 1. Staffel of JG 300 and had 19 night victories to his credit. In January 1944, Müller was appointed Gruppenkommandeur of 1. Staffel of Nachtjagdgruppe 10 (NJGr 10—10th Night Fighter Group) and was charged with evaluating all aspects of technical and tactical experimentation concerning single-engined night fighting, especially countering operations by the RAF's Mosquito fast bomber. Hauptmann Müller was awarded the Knight's Cross of the Iron Cross (Ritterkreuz des Eisernen Kreuzes) on 27 July 1944 for 23 victories.

Müller then became commander of I. Gruppe of Nachtjagdgeschwader 11 (NJG 11) on 26 August 1944. Müller continued to fly against the RAF night bomber streams, allegedly sometimes flying a personal Bf 109G-14 uniquely fitted with an oblique-mounted MG 151/20 cannon in a Schräge Musik installation behind the cockpit, although has yet to be verified. Müller claimed a Mosquito near Eindhoven on 23 August 1944 and a Lancaster over Frankfurt on 12 September 1944. The Mosquito was Mark B-XX, KB242 of No. 608 Squadron RAF, based at Downham Market. Flown by Flt Lt SD Webb RCAF and navigator F/O John Campbell RAFVR, the badly damaged Mosquito crash landed at RAF Woodbridge at 01:10 hours. The crew escaped unhurt. A double victory was claimed over Lancasters on 4 December 1944.

By late 1944 and into 1945, Müller flew numerous nocturnal ground attack missions against Allied railway targets and supply columns. His last known victories were both on 21 February 1945.Towards the end of the war, I./NJG 11 received a few Messerschmitt Me 262 jet fighters to experiment with in night interceptions. Müller died on 2 November 1987. Müller was one of the leading single-seat night fighter aces with 30 night victories (and three unconfirmed) claimed in 52 missions.

== Summary of career ==
=== Aerial victory claims ===
According to Obermaier, Müller was credited with 30 nocturnal aerial victories claimed in Wilde Sau night fighter operations. He flew 52 combat missions. Boiten lists him with 14 confirmed plus 15 further unconfirmed aerial victories. Foreman, Mathews and Parry, authors of Luftwaffe Night Fighter Claims 1939 – 1945, list 30 nocturnal victory claims. Mathews and Foreman also published Luftwaffe Aces — Biographies and Victory Claims, also listing Müller with 30 claims, including one Mosquito.

Chronicle of aerial victories
Claim	Date	Time	Type	Location	Serial No./Squadron No.
– Versuchskommando Herrmann –
1	4 July 1943	01:28	Halifax	near Cologne	
– I./Versuchskommando Herrmann –
2	11 August 1943	00:44	Halifax	35 km (22 mi) north-northeast Biblis	
3	11 August 1943	00:45	Halifax	area north Heidelberg	
– Stab/Jagdgeschwader Herrmann –
4	18 August 1943	01:45	Lancaster	Swinemünde	
5	18 August 1943	01:58	Lancaster	10 km (6.2 mi) northwest Swinemünde	
– Stab/Jagdgeschwader 300 –
6	24 August 1943	00:15	Halifax	Gassen near Genheim	
7	24 August 1943	00:58	Stirling	Berlin	
8	24 August 1943	01:15	Stirling	Berlin	
9	28 August 1943	02:12	Lancaster	10–15 km (6.2–9.3 mi) west Nuremberg	
10	6 September 1943	00:07	Halifax	near Mannheim	
11	6 September 1943	00:37	Stirling	10 km (6.2 mi) north Speyer	
12	7 September 1943	00:37	Lancaster	15 km (9.3 mi) southeast Munich	
13	7 September 1943	00:48	Lancaster	Munich	
14	27 September 1943	23:09	Lancaster	Hildesheim	
15	2 October 1943	23:34	Halifax	mid-Munich	
16	3 October 1943	22:41	four-engined bomber	10–15 km (6.2–9.3 mi) southeast Kassel	
17	4 October 1943	21:35	Halifax	Hülst	
18	9 October 1943	01:29	Halifax	northwest Hanover	
19	18 October 1943	20:24	Lancaster	near Hildesheim	LM326/No. 207 Squadron
– 1/Nachtjagdgruppe 10 –
20	20 February 1944	04:14	Lancaster	Leipzig	
21	23 May 1944	00:54	Halifax	10–15 km (6.2–9.3 mi) north Dortmund	
22	23 May 1944	01:16	Lancaster	north Bonn	
23	25 May 1944	01:06	four-engined bomber	Roermond	
24	23 August 1944	23:25	Mosquito	Eindhoven	KB242/No. 608 Squadron
– I/Nachtjagdgeschwader 11 –
25	12 September 1944	23:06	Lancaster	northwest Frankfurt am Main	
26	4 December 1944	19:35	Lancaster	Wörth-Lautersbach	
27	4 December 1944	19:43	Lancaster	southwest Karlsruhe	
28	14 January 1945	—	Lancaster		
29	21 February 1945	—	four-engined bomber		
30	21 February 1945	—	four-engined bomber		

=== Awards ===
- Iron Cross (1939) 2nd and 1st Class
- Honour Goblet of the Luftwaffe (Ehrenpokal der Luftwaffe) on 13 December 1943 as Hauptmann and pilot (Note: According to Obermaier on 26 November 1943.)
- German Cross in Gold on 25 November 1943 as Hauptmann in the Stab/Jagdgeschwader 300
- Knight's Cross of the Iron Cross on 27 July 1944 as Hauptmann and Staffelkapitän of the 1./Nachtjagdgruppe 10
