= No. 193 Squadron RAF =

Defunct flying squadron of the Royal Air Force

No. 193 (Fellowship of the Bellows) Squadron RAF
- Active: 18 December 1942 – 31 August 1945
- Country: United Kingdom
- Branch: Royal Air Force
- Part of: RAF Fighter Command
- Nickname: Fellowship of the Bellows
- Mottos: Latin: Aera et Terram Imperare ("To govern the air and the earth")

Insignia
- Squadron Badge heraldry: A Montagu's harrier volant carrying a grenade – fired
- Squadron Codes: DP (Dec 1942 – Aug 1945)

No. 193 Squadron RAF was a fighter squadron of the Royal Air Force during World War II.

== History ==
No. 193 Squadron was formed at RAF Harrowbeer, Devon on 18 December 1942 as a fighter/ground attack unit. Although designated to operate the new Hawker Typhoon, the squadron at first used the Hawker Hurricane until the Typhoon was declared operational in April 1943.

In November 1943 the squadron was used to attack the German V-1 launch sites. The squadron then moved base in the south of England a number of times supporting the buildup for invasion. From 6 June 1944 the squadron was busy supporting the invasion force in the close-support fighter-bomber role. It was based on the Continent from 11 September 1944 as it continued to support the advancing armies in France, Belgium and Germany. The squadron disbanded on 31 August 1945 at Hildesheim.

== Trivia ==
Some of the squadron's Typhoon aircraft were paid for by the Brazilian branch of the Fellowship of the Bellows, which were a loosely organised international groups formed during World War II to collect funds for the purchase of aircraft for the Royal Air Force.

== Aircraft operated ==
From	To	Aircraft	Variant
Jan 1943	Feb 1943	Hawker Hurricane	Mk.IIb
Jan 1943	Aug 1945	Hawker Typhoon	Mk.Ib

== See also ==
- Cap Arcona
- List of Royal Air Force aircraft squadrons
