= Fellowship of the Bellows =

The Fellowships of the Bellows was a fundraising organisation active in Latin America during World War II aimed at raising money to purchase aircraft for the Royal Air Force. Its name, organisation and rituals parodied masonic-like fraternities. Raul Lopez Henriquez from Venezuela received the Fellow certificate #876 in Maracaibo on July 17th of 1941

== Fellowship of the Bellows groups ==
=== Argentina ===
The idea of collecting "funds through fun" for assisting the war effort was conceived at a meeting of four members of the British/Anglo Argentine community in a Buenos Aires bar. The RAF was chosen as the beneficiary because at that time almost all the volunteers from Argentina had enrolled in the RAF; with losses already having been suffered it was an emotive matter in the local community. Within a short time they publicised the concept and called an open meeting at the English Club in Buenos Aires on 14 October 1940 and the ideas were outlined from behind a curtain in order to preserve their anonymity. The meeting appointed them as a committee of "Servants", and the "Fellowship of the Bellows" (for More Air Force) took off. The "Servants" consisted of the High Wind (what he says blows), who gathered round him: Secretaries – the Whirlwinds (always in a flap); Cashier – Receiver of Windfalls; Treasurer – Keeper of the Windbag; and a Lady Member – The Windlass (very easy on the air).

The concept spread and from the start employed British humour and advertising copy-writing skills, with plays on words. The pressing need at that time was for MORE AIR FORCE, so clearly BELLOWS were needed to increase the AIR FORCE; thousands of BELLOWS to RAISE THE WIND. The funds raised were sent to the Ministry of Aircraft Production. The initiative proved to be outstandingly successful and within a very short time many other countries set up their own similar "Fellowships".

The rules they devised were (a) the Servants must remain anonymous; (b) various levels of "fellow" were created, and promotion was based on payment of one’s selected contribution multiplied by the number of confirmed enemy aircraft destroyed during the previous month, as published by the UK Air Ministry; (c) the appeal must be within the reach of everyone, with a joining fee of 1 Argentine Peso (then about £1/16th), and each "fellow" setting their own level of pledged contribution, with a minimum of 1 cent (about £1/1600th) – office boy and boss would therefore progress at the same speed, having paid up their selected rate of contribution for each plane destroyed; (d) anyone missing a monthly payment ("Blow in") could make up their arrears when they had the funds to do so, and promotion would then be achieved; (e) it must be couched in a humorous vein ("funds through fun").

Enrolment was effected by payment of the joining fee at which point one ceased being a "Snuff" ("infinitely worse than being a cross-eyed toad with athlete's foot") and became a Fellow with the rank of PUFF (Soplito) and given a badge of a particular colour, depicting a bellows, to wear in his buttonhole or brooch on her blouse. The Fellow then paid his pledged amount for each enemy plane brought down during the month. Setting the minimum so low was a masterstroke, which would enable many more potential "Snuffs" to become Fellows.

Upon joining one was issued with an official booklet which contained: one's name and Fellowship Number for accounting purposes; information on how the fellowship worked; how to make the salute for greeting "fellow bellows" (upward spiral motion of first finger of right hand depicting an eddy of wind); tear-out slips for handing in with contributions so that it could be recorded by the servants (receipts were given); a chart on the back page for monitoring one's own progress towards promotion. The Fellows were encouraged to continue to contribute because after 1,000 planes had been certified by the Air Ministry and paid for, the Fellow was promoted from PUFF (Soplito) to GUST (Rafaga) and given another distinctive badge. And so the quest for funds through fun went on: with 2,500 planes down and paid for, the GUST became a GALE (Vendaval); 5,000 planes created a HURRICANE (Huracán), 6,500 a TORNADO (Tornado) and 8,000 a TYPHOON (Tifón). With each promotion, a further distinctive badge was issued. 10,000 planes downed and paid for entitled Fellows to obtain the honour: THE ORDER OF THE BELLOWS and were given their wings; wings were added to a special badge depicting a bellows. It was a further masterstroke that the incentive of promotion encouraged continuing monthly payments.

The Fellowship of the Bellows spread with such enthusiasm and speed that the initial target of £100,000 was reached and submitted to the Air Ministry, so the Servants of the Bellows quickly created new and still more exalted ranks of promotion at each additional 2,000 plane mark, each with its winged badge, in order to keep up the momentum (Air speed). The full range of badges with their descriptions is shown below:

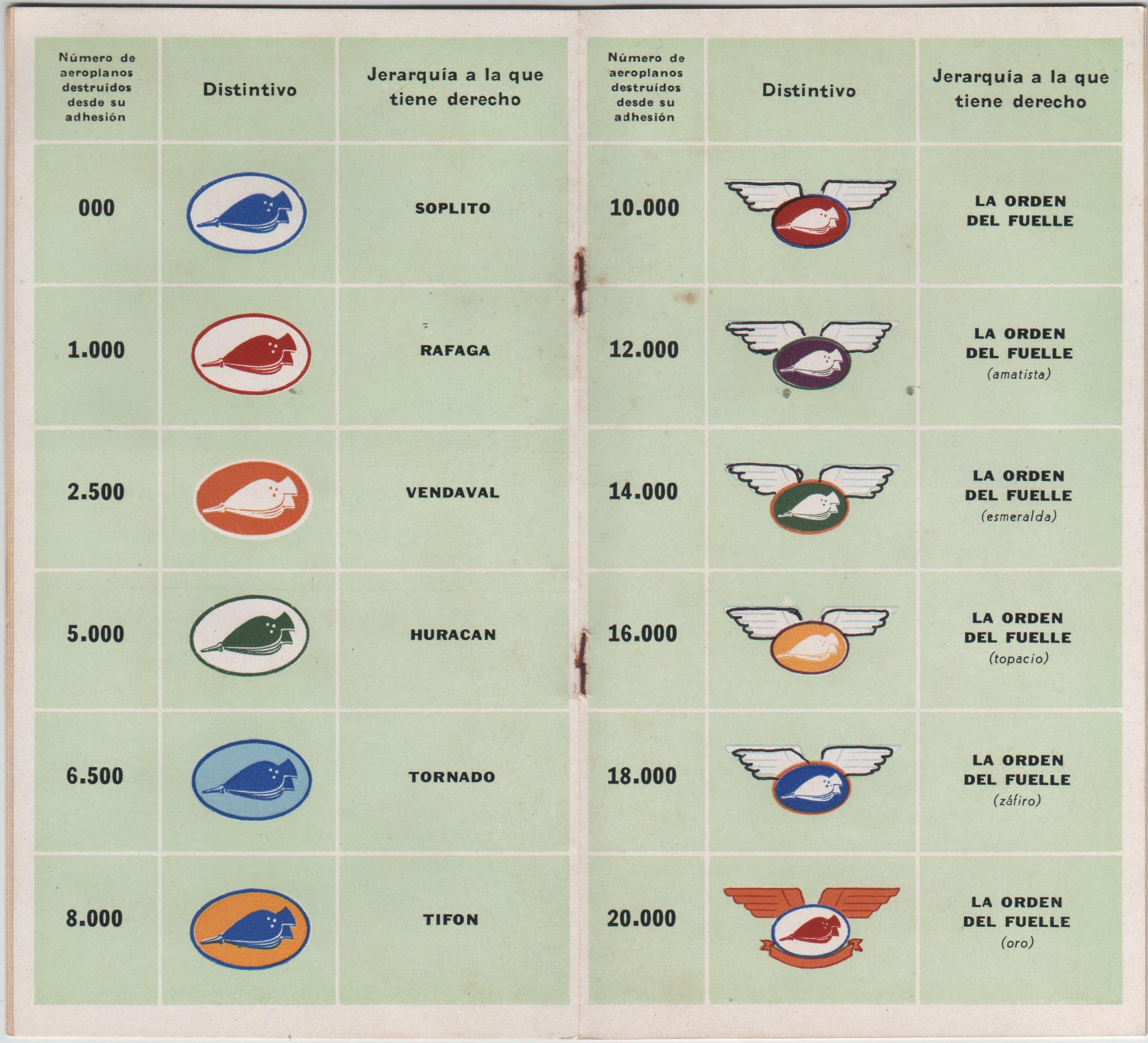
Badges of the Fellowship of the Bellows

Badges of the Fellowship of the Bellows (La Fraternidad del Fuelle) from publicity booklet in Spanish.

On 30 December 1940 Time magazine published an article entitled "Whiffs, Puffs and Snuffs" relating to the Fellowship. The Servants were horrified that their names were "leaked" in the article, obliging them thereafter to categorically deny their involvement, in accordance with their principle of anonymity.

The first Bellows plane took to the air labelled BELLOW ARGENTINA No. 1 in March 1941 after only 4½ months. Plane after plane was added, and in July 1942, 263 Squadron took delivery of 20 Westland Whirlwind fighters and the squadron adopted the nickname "Fellowship of the Bellows".

The contributions (blow-ins) were collected by an appointed "Airpocket" in every town and village and passed on to the Cashier (Receiver of Windfalls) who then took them to the Bank where the Treasurer (Keeper of the Windbag) saw that the funds were sent to the Ministry of Aircraft Production – by Airmail of course. The Fellowship spread from Argentina very rapidly to the neighbouring countries of Uruguay, Chile, Peru, Bolivia and Brazil where it was taken up most enthusiastically resulting in the creation of Squadron 193, the "Brazilian Squadron". It spread further to Colombia, Venezuela, Ecuador, Mexico, Curaçao, Aruba, Jamaica, Cuba, Nicaragua, Falkland Islands, Guatemala, El Salvador and even to Hong Kong.

Contributions generally went towards aircraft production. On 10 November 1944 another Bellows squadron was formally presented to Air Chief Marshal Sir Arthur Harris at Godmanchester Airfield, from funds raised by the Fellowship worldwide. This became Squadron 692 and consisted of 31 Mosquito bombers. The handover was done on behalf of the Fellowship by the High Wind and the Windlass, who by this time were in UK serving in the RNVR and WAAF. When the Fellowship of the Bellows was wound up the total amount collected was Pesos 9,542,734.58 (approx. £600,000) of which Argentina was responsible for Pesos 3,140,000.00 (approx. £200,000). This had been sent to the Ministry of Aircraft Production through the British Patriotic Fund. In addition, Pesos 747,228.60 (approx. £50,000) was sent to the RAF Benevolent Fund, and Pesos 16,298 (approx. £1,000) was used to assist Argentine scholars abroad. The total number of Fellows was estimated to be over 200,000 including 56,000 in Argentina and 35,000 in Uruguay.

On 7 September 1945, the "Fellowships of the Bellows" blew themselves out at a mammoth "Deflation Party" at the Plaza Hotel, Buenos Aires attended by more than 1,000 "fellow bellows", including specially selected young ladies to represent each of the many Latin American countries that had raised funds in this way. Nearly 10 million Pesos (approx. £600,000) had been raised at a time when a Spitfire cost £5,000.

The founders of the Fellowship of the Bellows maintained their anonymity throughout their lives and eschewed any publicity. However, the identity of the principals can now (2014) formally be made public. The High Wind was E A (Bill) Rumboll, who was with Ernst Berg & Cia (Advertising Agency) and also worked for British Intelligence in Buenos Aires until he had to flee to Britain when his cover was blown. Then in the latter part of the war, operating out of London, he ran the escape routes through Spain to enable British servicemen to reach Gibraltar and return to Britain. Some RAF crew, who had escaped capture, returned via this route and saw active service again within 24 hours of reaching Britain. The Whirlwinds (Secretaries) were George Ward and Alan Murray of London & South America Investment Trust. The Receiver of Windfalls (Cashier) was Colin Shearer and the Keeper of the Windbag (Treasurer) was George Collins.

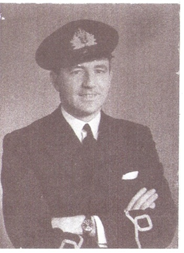
EA (Bill) Rumboll in his British Naval Uniform

The Royal Air Force Museum Archive and Library collections contain more than eighty items relating to the Fellowship of the Bellows comprising letters, membership documents and photographs. Copies of much original material (including a montage of badges) was given to the library of the Royal Air Force Museum in January 1999, in the name of the Servants of the Bellows. Copies are kept by J W E Rumboll (second son of E A (Bill) Rumboll (1910-1978), the High Wind), who made the decision that the identity of the Servants of the Bellows should be confirmed as above.

=== Brazil ===
Similarly in Brazil some British citizens looked for a way to help the British war effort. An initial "Spitfire Fund" was started, and donations bought Spitfires for the RAF. These aircraft purchased were identified with the names of the fundraisers which were painted on the side of the engine or under the canopy. Seeking to widen the scope of the campaign, the owner of Sloper's department store, with the help of the Brazilian Telephone Company, began a telephone campaign to obtain more donations. Also known as the "Fellowship of the Bellows" this was a complete success:

The main body of the group were students and shop workers. Each member of the Bellows paid a monthly subscription. The club eventually reach ten Brazilian States and in 1942 raised the amount of £80,000 sterling.

The Fellowship helped with the purchase of de Havilland Mosquitos for No. 692 Squadron RAF shortly after it was formed in January 1944.

=== Curaçao ===
In Curaçao in the Dutch West Indies the Rotary Club founded the Curaçao chapter of the Fellowship of the Bellows, and in addition it spearheaded a drive to acquire a Red Cross lifeboat and helped establish the Prins Bernhard Foundation. Each of these channeled financial help to the mother country (the Netherlands) and Britain. Aruba in the same island group had a similar group.

=== Other groups ===
Other places in the Americas with such groups were:

- Chile
- Falkland Islands
- Mexico
- New Orleans
- Paraguay
- Peru
- Uruguay
- Venezuela

== Fellowship of the Bellows RAF squadrons ==
Aircraft purchased through groups of Fellowship of the Bellows went in particular to these squadrons:

- No. 193 Squadron RAF
- No. 263 Squadron RAF
- No. 692 Squadron RAF
