= Night fighter =

Fighter aircraft adapted or designed for use at night

Night fighter / All-weather fighter
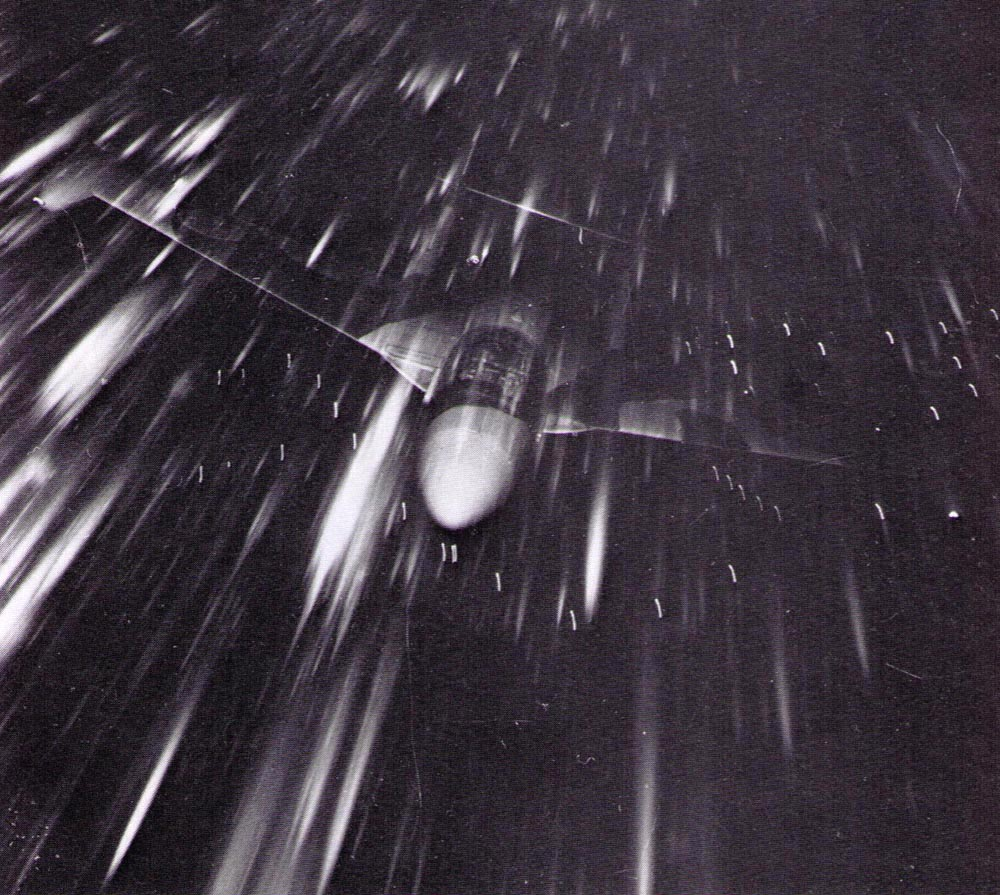
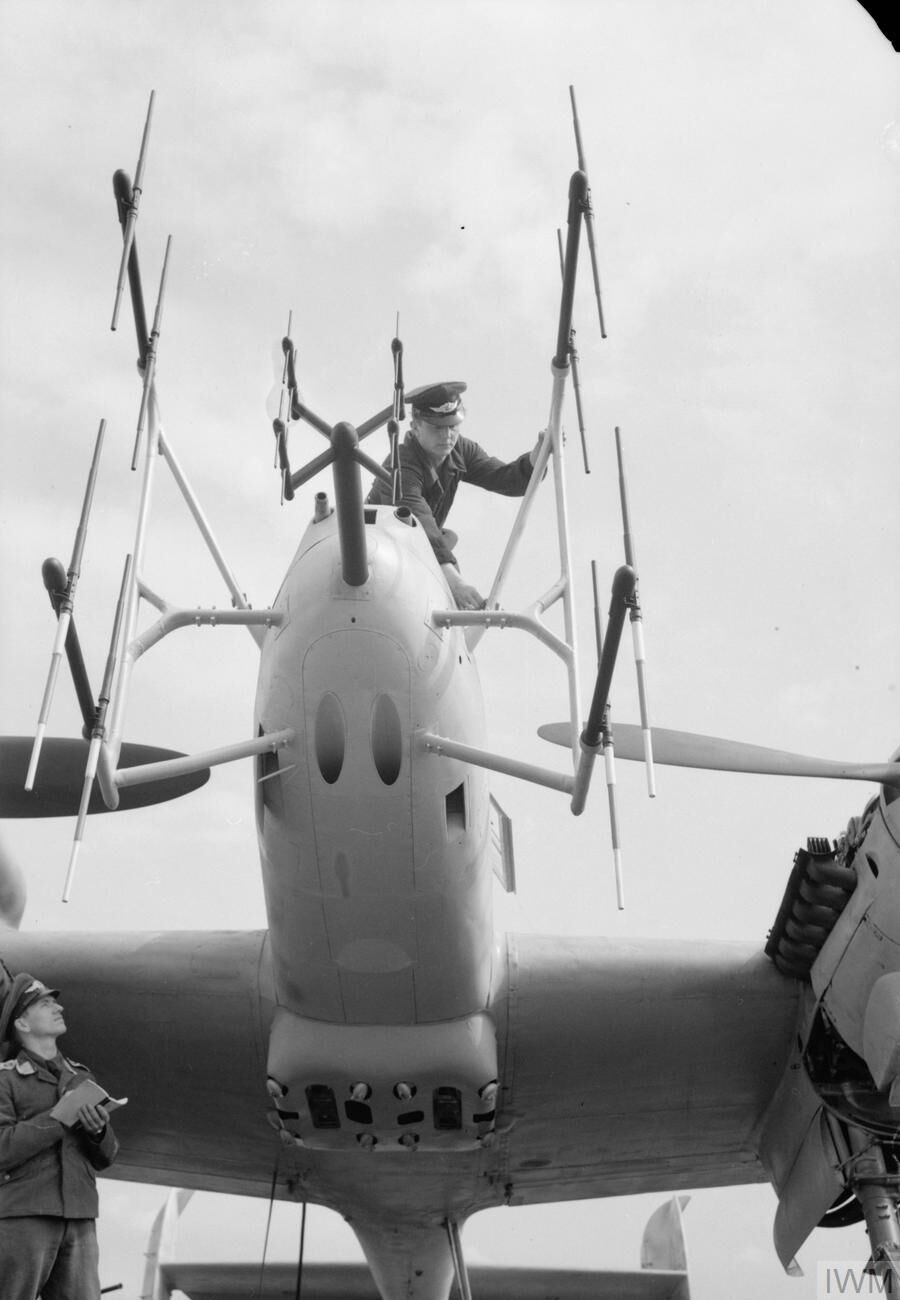
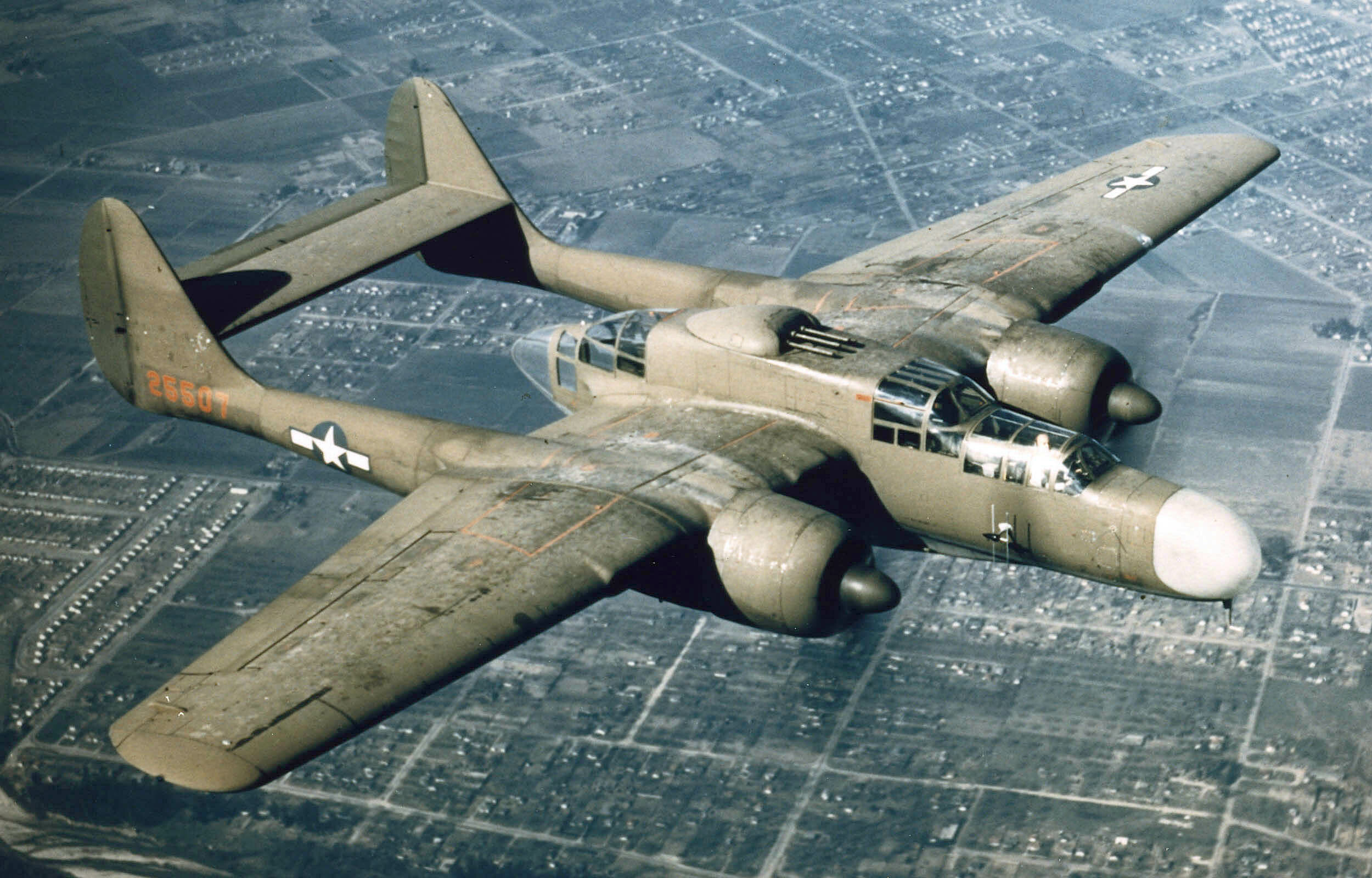
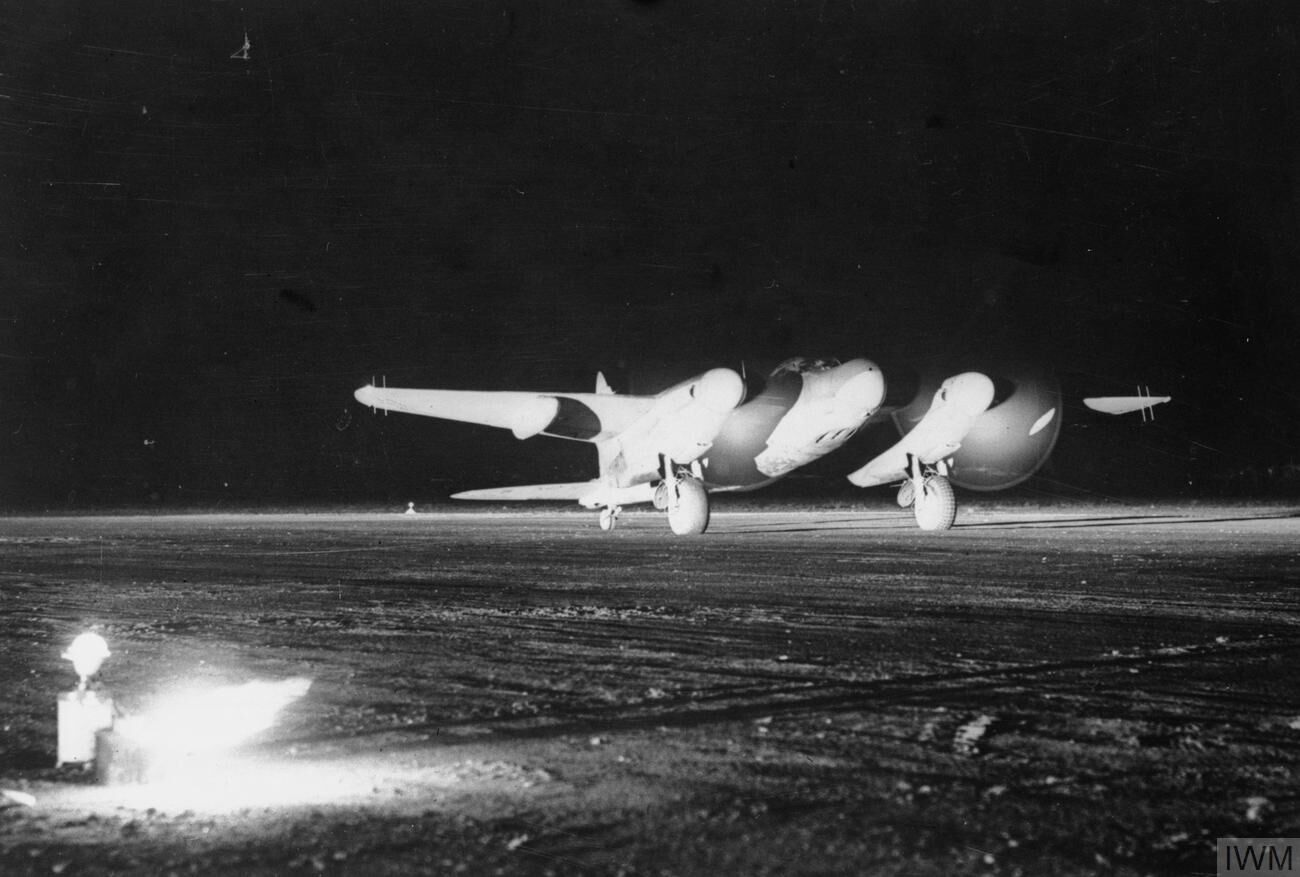
- Top left: Swedish de Havilland Venom NF.51 (J 33), during night operation 1954
- Top right: The nose of a German Lichtenstein radar-equipped Messerschmitt Bf 110 G-4 night fighter
- Bottom left: American Northrop P-61 Black Widow night fighter with a radome nose for its radar
- Bottom right: A de Havilland Mosquito night fighter, with centimetric radar in nose radome

A night fighter (later known as all-weather fighter or all-weather interceptor post-Second World War) is a largely historical term for a fighter or interceptor aircraft adapted or designed for effective use at night, during periods of adverse meteorological conditions, or in otherwise poor visibility. Such designs were in direct contrast to day fighters: fighters and interceptors designed primarily for use during the day or during good weather. The concept of the night fighter was developed and experimented with during the First World War but would not see widespread use until WWII. The term would be supplanted by "all-weather fighter/interceptor" post-WWII, with advancements in various technologies permitting the use of such aircraft in virtually all conditions.

During the Second World War, night fighters were either purpose-built night fighter designs, or more commonly, heavy fighters or light bombers adapted for the mission, often employing radar or other systems for providing some sort of detection capability in low visibility. Many night fighters of the conflict also included instrument landing systems for landing at night, as turning on the runway lights made runways into an easy target for opposing intruders. Some experiments tested the use of day fighters on night missions, but these tended to work only under very favourable circumstances and were not widely successful. The war would see the first aircraft ever that was explicitly designed from the outset to function as a night fighter, the Northrop P-61 Black Widow.

Avionics systems were greatly miniaturised over time, allowing the addition of radar altimeter, terrain-following radar, improved instrument landing system, microwave landing system, Doppler weather radar, LORAN receivers, GEE, TACAN, inertial navigation system, GPS, and GNSS in aircraft. The addition of greatly improved landing and navigation equipment combined with radar led to the use of the term all-weather fighter or all-weather fighter attack, depending on the aircraft capabilities. The use of the term night fighter gradually faded away as a result of these improvements making the vast majority of fighters capable of night operation.

== History ==
=== Early examples ===
At the start of the First World War, most combatants had little capability of flying at night, and little need to do so. The only targets that could be attacked with any possibility of being hit in limited visibility would be cities, an unthinkable target at the time. The general assumption of a quick war meant no need existed for strategic attacks.

Things changed on 22 September and 8 October 1914, when the Royal Naval Air Service bombed the production line and hangars of the Zeppelin facilities in Cologne and Düsseldorf. Although defences had been set up, all of them proved woefully inadequate. As early as 1915, (Note: "October 13th 1915... [Second Lieutenant John Slessor] lifted his BE2c into the blackness to search for the intruder.") a number of B.E.2c aircraft (the infamous "Fokker Fodder") were modified into the first night fighters. After lack of success while using darts and small incendiary bombs to attack Zeppelins from above, ultimately a Lewis gun loaded with novel incendiary ammunition, was mounted at an angle of 45° to fire upwards, to attack the enemy from below. This technique proved to be very effective.

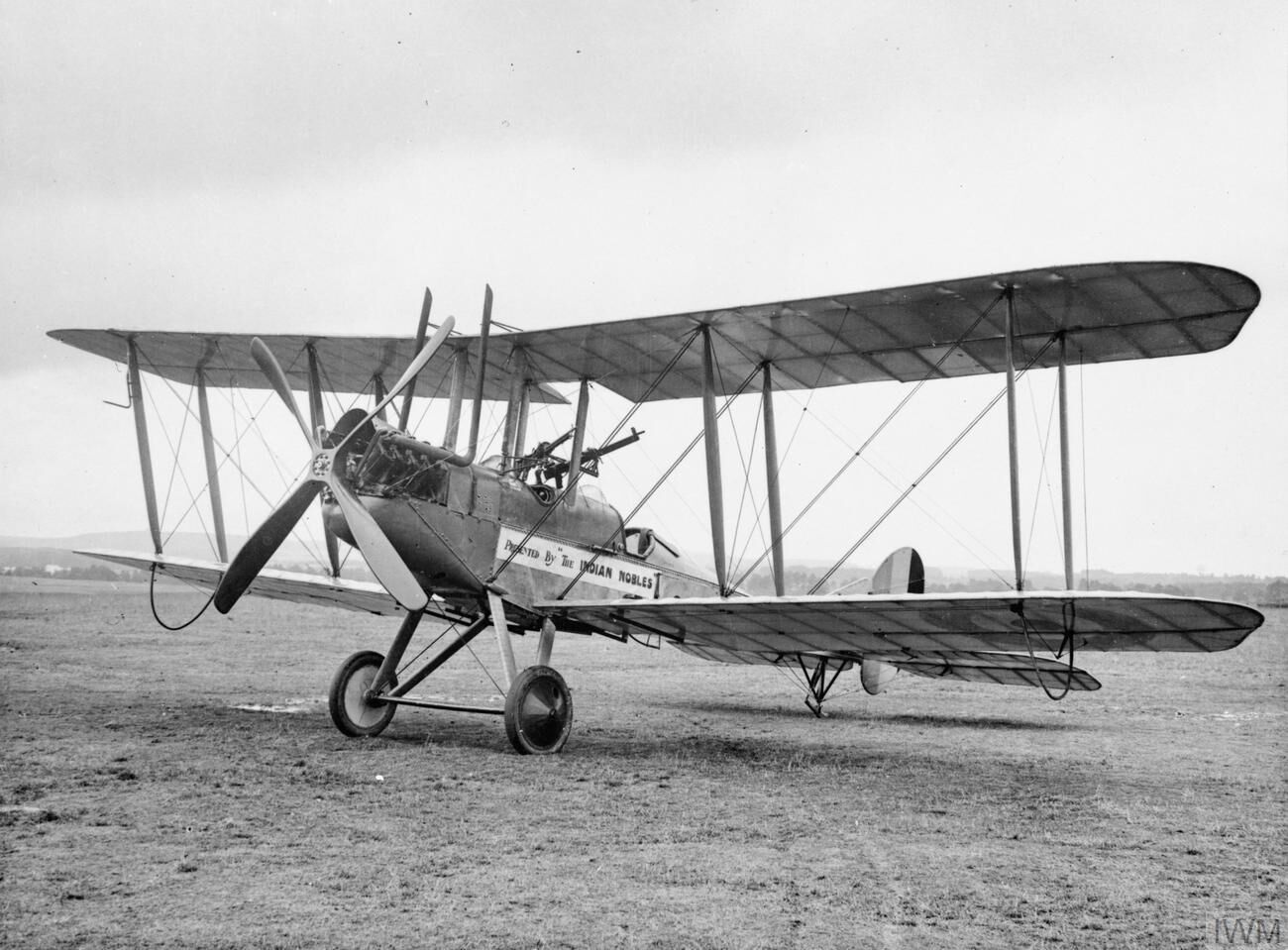
Operational B.E.2c with RAF 1a engine, "V" undercarriage, streamlined cowling on sump, and cut-out in upper centre section to improve field of fire for gunner

After over a year of night Zeppelin raids, on the night of 2–3 September 1916, a BE2c flown by Captain William Leefe Robinson downed the SL 11, the first German airship to be shot down over Britain. This action won the pilot a Victoria Cross and cash prizes totaling £3,500 put up by a number of individuals. This downing was not an isolated victory; five more German airships were similarly destroyed between October and December 1916, and caused the airship campaign to gradually be diminished over the next year with fewer raids mounted. (Note: By 1918, only four Zeppelin raids against London were mounted.)

Because of airships' limitations, the Luftstreitkräfte began to introduce long-range heavy bombers, starting with the Gotha G.IV aircraft that gradually took over the offensive. While their early daylight raids in May 1917 were able to easily evade the weak defenses of London, the strengthening of the home defence fighter force led to the Germans switching to night raids from 3 September 1917. To counter night attacks, Sopwith Camel day fighters were deployed in the night fighter role. The Camels' Vickers guns were replaced by Lewis guns mounted over the wings, as the flash from the Vickers tended to dazzle the pilot when they were fired, and synchronised guns were considered unsafe for firing incendiary ammunition. Further modification led to the cockpit being moved rearwards. The modified aircraft were nicknamed the "Sopwith Comic". To provide suitable equipment for Home Defence squadrons in the north of the UK, Avro 504K trainers were converted to night fighters by removing the front cockpit and mounting a Lewis gun on the top wing.

=== Interwar period ===
With little money to spend on development, especially during the Great Depression, night-fighting techniques changed little until just prior to World War II.

In the meantime, aircraft performance had improved tremendously; compared to their First World War counterparts, modern bombers could fly about twice as fast, at over twice the altitude, with much greater bomb loads. They flew fast enough that the time between detecting them and the bombers reaching their targets left little time to launch interceptors to shoot them down. Higher altitude bombers also required extremely large and heavy antiaircraft guns to attack them, badly limiting the number of guns available. At night, or with limited visibility, these problems were compounded. The widespread conclusion was that "the bomber will always get through", and the Royal Air Force invested almost all of their efforts in developing a night bomber force, with the Central Flying School responsible for one of the most important developments in the period by introducing "blind flying" training.

The Spanish Republican Air Force used some Polikarpov I-15s as night fighters. Pilot José Falcó had equipped his fighter with a radio receiver for land-based guidance for interception. One of the I-15s configured for night operations, fitted with tracer and explosive .30 rounds, scored a daylight double victory against Bf 109s in the closing stages of the war.

Nevertheless, some new technologies appeared to offer potential ways to improve night-fighting capability. During the 1930s, considerable development of infrared detectors occurred among all of the major forces, but in practice, these proved almost unusable. The only such system to see any sort of widespread operational use was the Spanner Anlage system used on the Dornier Do 17Z night fighters of the Luftwaffe. These were often also fitted with a large IR searchlight to improve the amount of light being returned.

Immediately prior to the opening of the war, radar was introduced operationally for the first time. Initially, these systems were unwieldy, and development of IR systems continued. Realizing that radar was a far more practical solution to the problem, Robert Watson-Watt handed the task of developing a radar suitable for aircraft use to 'Taffy' Bowen in the mid-1930s. In September 1937, he gave a working demonstration of the concept when a test aircraft was able to detect three Home Fleet capital ships in the North Sea in bad weather.

The promising implications of the test were not lost on planners, who reorganised radar efforts and gave them increased priority. This led to efforts to develop an operational unit for aircraft interception (AI). The size of these early AI radars required a large aircraft to lift them, and their complex controls required a multiperson crew to operate them. This naturally led to the use of light bombers as the preferred platform for aircraft interception radars, and in May 1939, the first experimental flight took place, on a Fairey Battle.

=== Second World War ===
The war opened on 1 September 1939, and by this time, the RAF were well advanced with plans to build a radar – then called 'RDF' in Britain – equipped night-fighter fleet. The Aircraft Interception Mk. II radar (AI Mk. II) was being fitted experimentally to a small number of Bristol Blenheim aircraft, having been selected for this role as its fuselage was sufficiently roomy to accommodate the additional crew member and radar apparatus; the first prototype system went into service in November 1939, long before the opening of major British operations. These early systems had significant practical problems, and while work was underway to correct these flaws, by the time the Blitz opened in August 1940, the night fighter fleet was still in its infancy.

Through this period, the RAF experimented with many other aircraft and interception methods in an effort to get a working night fighter force. One attempt to make up for the small number of working radars was to fit an AI to a Douglas Havoc bomber which also carried a searchlight in its nose. These Turbinlite aircraft were intended to find the targets and illuminate them with the searchlight, allowing Hurricanes adapted for night flying to shoot them down visually. This proved almost impossible to arrange in practice, and the Cat Eye fighters had little luck during the closing months of 1940. The Turbinlite squadrons were disbanded in early 1943.

By early 1941, the first examples of a production-quality radar, AI Mk. IV, were beginning to arrive. This coincided with the arrival of the Beaufighter, which offered significantly higher performance than the pre-war Blenheims; it was the highest performance aircraft capable of carrying the bulky early aircraft interception radars used for night fighter operations, and quickly became invaluable as a night fighter. Over the next few months, more and more Beaufighters arrived and the success of the night fighters roughly doubled every month until May, when the Luftwaffe ended their bombing efforts. Although night bombing never ended, its intensity was greatly decreased, giving the RAF time to introduce the AI Mk. VIII radar working in the microwave band, and the de Havilland Mosquito to mount it. (Note: The Mosquito increased German night-fighter losses to such an extent the Germans were said to have awarded two victories for shooting one down.) This combination remained the premier night fighter until the end of the war.

As the German effort wound down, the RAF's own bombing campaign was growing. The Mosquitos had little to do over the UK, so a number of squadrons were formed within No. 100 Group RAF and fitted with special systems, such as Perfectos and Serrate, for homing-in on German night fighters. The British also experimented with mounting pilot-operated AI Mark 6 radar sets in single-seat fighters, and the Hurricane II C(NF), a dozen of which were produced in 1942, became the first radar-equipped, single-seat night fighter in the world. It served with 245 and 247 Squadrons briefly and unsuccessfully before being sent to India to 176 Squadron, with which it served until the end of 1943. A similarly radar-equipped Hawker Typhoon was also developed, but no production followed.

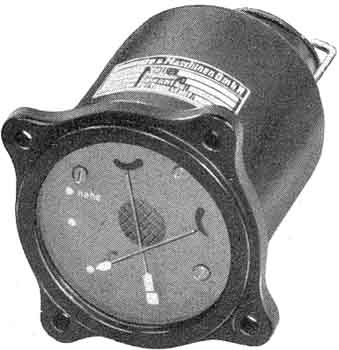
Luftwaffe instrument landing system indicator, built 1943

German aircraft interception radar efforts at this point were about two years behind the British. Unlike in Britain, where the major targets lay only a few minutes' flight time from the coast, targets in Germany after the occupation of France in 1940 were far from Allied airbases, which gave German air defenses long times to deal with intruding bombers. Instead of airborne radar, they relied on ground-based systems; the targets would first be picked up by radar assigned to a "cell", the radar would then direct a searchlight to "paint" the target, allowing the fighters to attack them without on-board aids. The searchlights were later supplanted with short-range radars that tracked both the fighters and bombers, allowing ground operators to direct the fighters to their targets. By July 1940, this system was well developed as the Kammhuber Line, and proved able to deal with the small raids by isolated bombers the RAF was carrying out at the time.

At the urging of R.V. Jones, the RAF changed their raid tactics to gather all of their bombers into a single "stream". This meant that the ground-based portion of the system was overwhelmed; with only one or two searchlights or radars available per "cell", the system was able to handle perhaps six interceptions per hour. By flying all of the bombers over a cell in a short period, the vast majority of the bombers flew right over them without ever having been plotted, let alone attacked. German success against the RAF plummeted, reaching a nadir on 30/31 May 1942, when the first 1,000-bomber raid attacked Cologne, losing only four aircraft to German night fighters.

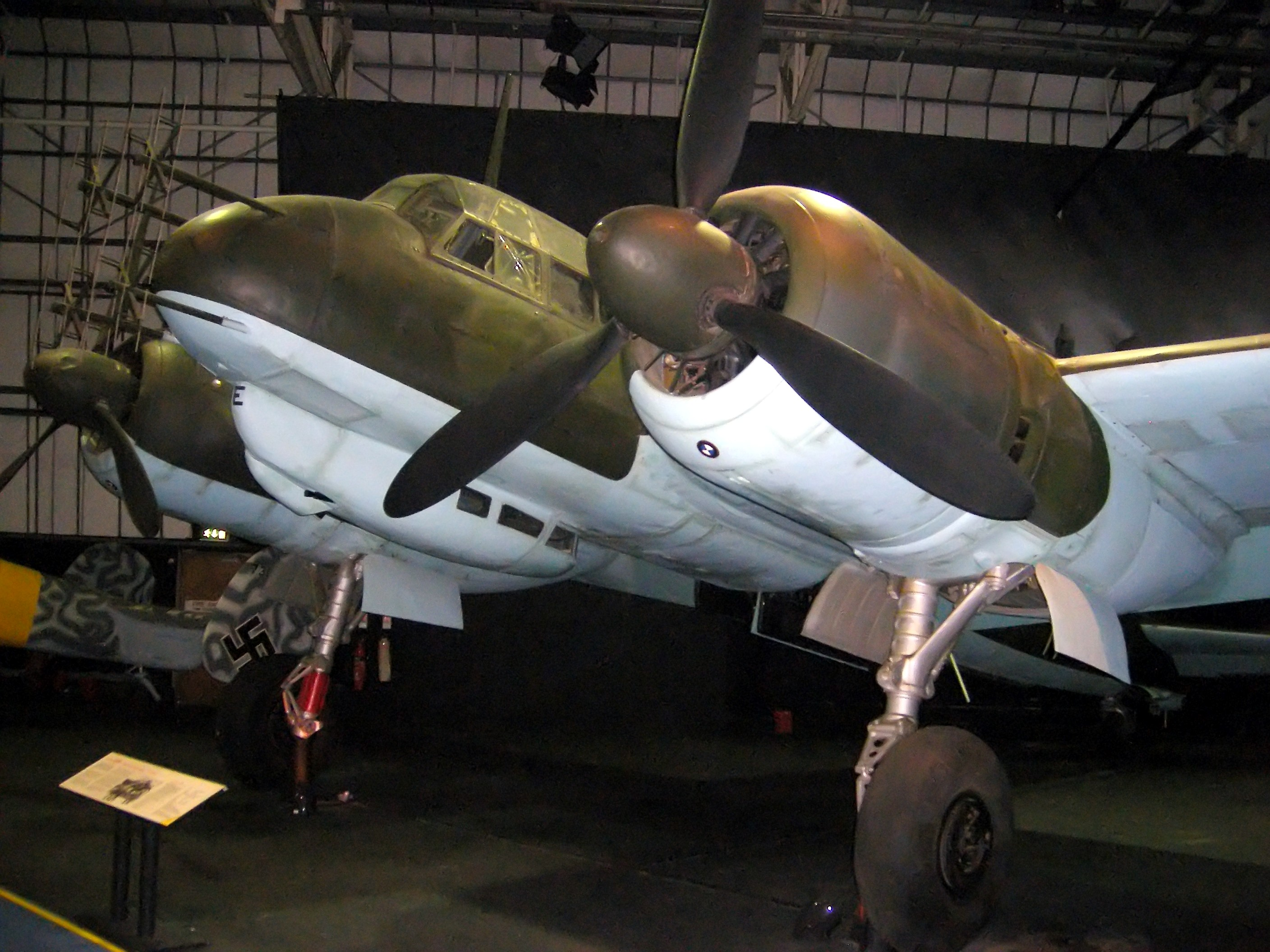
The Ju 88R-1 night fighter captured by the RAF in April 1943

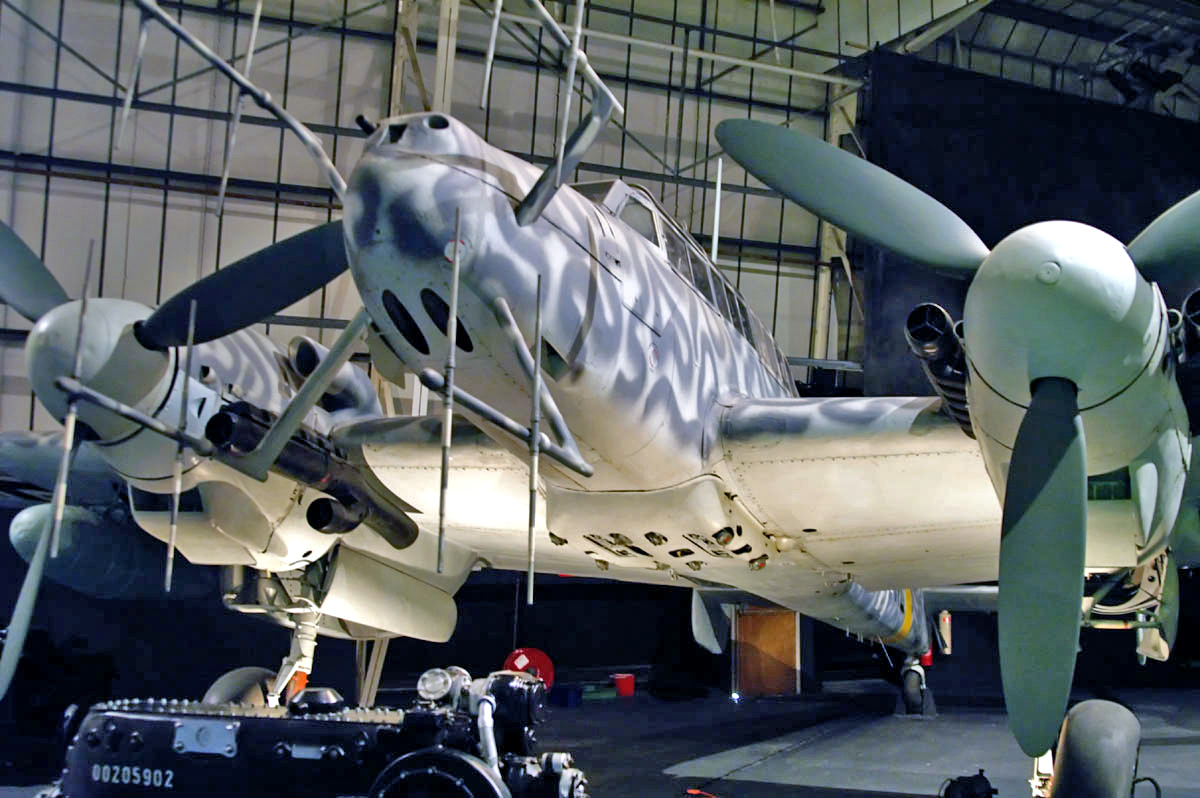
A restored Bf 110G night fighter with the VHF-band SN-2 radar antennae

In 1942, the Germans first started deploying the initial B/C low UHF-band version of the Lichtenstein radar, and in extremely limited numbers, using a 32-dipole element Matratze (mattress) antenna array. This late date, and slow introduction, combined with the capture of a Ju 88R-1 night fighter equipped with it in April 1943 when flown to RAF Dyce, Scotland, by a defecting Luftwaffe crew, allowed British radio engineers to develop jamming equipment to counter it. A race developed with the Germans attempting to introduce new sets and the British attempting to jam them. The early Lichtenstein B/C was replaced by the similar UHF-band Lichtenstein C-1, but when the German night fighter defected and landed in Scotland in April 1943, that radar was quickly jammed. The low VHF-band SN-2 unit that replaced the C-1 remained relatively secure until July 1944, but only at the cost of using huge, eight-dipole element Hirschgeweih (stag's antlers) antennae that slowed their fighters as much as 25 mph, making them easy prey for British night fighters that had turned to the offensive role. The capture in July 1944 of a Ju 88G-1 night fighter of NJG 2 equipped with an SN-2 Lichtenstein set, flown by mistake into RAF Woodbridge, revealed the secrets of the later, longer-wavelength replacement for the earlier B/C and C-1 sets.

The Luftwaffe also used single-engined aircraft in the night-fighter role, starting in 1939 with the Arado Ar 68 and early Messerschmitt Bf 109 models, which they later referred to as Wilde Sau (wild boar). In this case, the fighters, typically Focke-Wulf Fw 190s, were equipped only with a direction finder and landing lights to allow them to return to base at night. For the fighter to find their targets, other aircraft, which were guided from the ground, would drop strings of flares in front of the bombers. In other cases, the burning cities below provided enough light to see their targets. Messerschmitt Bf 109G variants had G6N and similar models fitted with FuG 350 Naxos "Z" radar receivers for homing in on the 3-gigahertz band H2S emissions of RAF bombers – the April 1944 combat debut of the American-designed H2X bomb-aiming radar, operating at a higher 10 GHz frequency for both RAF Pathfinder Mosquitos and USAAF B-24 Liberators that premiered their use over Europe, deployed a bombing radar that could not be detected by the German Naxos equipment. The Bf 109G series aircraft fitted with the Naxos radar detectors also were fitted with the low- to mid-VHF band FuG 217/218 Neptun active search radars, as were Focke-Wulf Fw 190 A-6/R11 aircraft: these served as radar-equipped night-fighters with NJGr 10 and NJG 11. A sole Fw 190 A-6 Wk.Nr.550214 fitted with FuG 217 is a rare survivor.

The effective Schräge Musik (Note: Schräge Musik was derived from the German colloquialism for "Jazz Music" (the German word "schräg" literally means "slanted" or "oblique"; it also has a secondary meaning of "weird", "strange", "off-key", or "abnormal" as in the English "queer")) offensive armament fitment was the German name given to installations of upward-firing autocannon mounted in large, twin-engined night fighters by the Luftwaffe and both the Imperial Japanese Navy Air Service and Imperial Japanese Army Air Service during World War II, with the first victories for the Luftwaffe and IJNAS each occurring in May 1943. This innovation allowed the night fighters to approach and attack bombers from below, where they were outside the bomber crew's field of view. Few bombers of that era carried defensive guns in the ventral position. An attack by a Schräge Musik-equipped fighter was typically a complete surprise to the bomber crew, who would only realise that a fighter was close by when they came under fire. Particularly in the initial stage of operational use until early 1944, the sudden fire from below was often attributed to ground fire rather than a fighter.

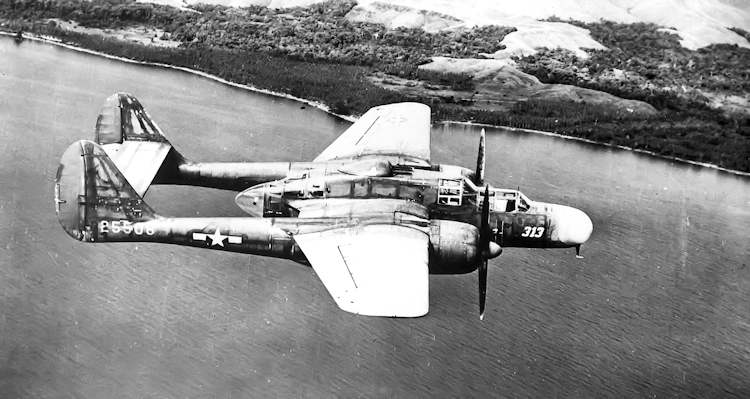
A wartime P-61A in flight

Rather than nighttime raids, the US Army Air Forces were dedicated to daytime bombing over Germany and Axis allies, that statistically were much more effective. The British night-bombing raids showed a success rate of only one out of 100 targets successfully hit. At the urging of the British, who were looking to purchase US-made aircraft, US day fighters were initially adapted to a night role, including the Douglas P-70 and later Lockheed P-38M "Night Lightning". The only purpose-built night fighter design deployed during the war, the American Northrop P-61 Black Widow was introduced first in Europe and then saw action in the Pacific, but it was given such a low priority that the British had ample supplies of their own designs by the time it was ready for production. The first USAAF unit using the P-61 did not move to Britain until February 1944; operational use did not start until the summer, and was limited throughout the war. Colonel Winston Kratz, director of night-fighter training in the USAAF, considered the P-61 as adequate in its role, "It was a good night fighter. It did not have enough speed".

The United States Navy (USN) Project Affirm was established at Naval Air Station Quonset Point on 18 April 1942 to develop night fighting equipment and tactics. Aircraft selection was limited to single-engine, single-seat planes by the requirement to be capable of operating from aircraft carriers. Urgency for the night-fighting role increased when Japanese aircraft successfully harassed naval forces on night raids in the Solomon Islands. The Japanese Navy had long screened new recruits for exceptional night vision, using the best on their ships and aircraft instead of developing new equipment for this role. VF(N)-75 was established as the first USN night fighter squadron on 10 April 1943. Six pilots with six aircraft were sent to the South Pacific on 1 August 1943. A Night Fighter Training Unit (NFTU) was established at Charlestown, Rhode Island, on 25 August 1943 using radar-equipped Douglas SBD Dauntless training aircraft to allow instructors to accompany student pilots. USN carrier-launched fighter combat missions began in January 1944 with six-plane detachments of single-engined Grumman F6F Hellcat (Note: The Hellcat proved to be the best single-engined night fighter deployed in World War II.) and Vought F4U Corsair fighters fitted with compact, microwave-band radar sets in wing-mounted pods. The specially trained night fighter and torpedo planes of Night Air Group 41 (NAG-41) began flying from USS Independence (CVL-22) in August 1944. NAG-41 achieved full night status on 1 October 1944 in time to participate in the Battle of Leyte Gulf. Night fighter patrols effectively countered kamikaze attacks timed to arrive during twilight conditions at dawn or dusk. In several cases these USN aircraft were used on raids of their own.

=== Postwar ===
Even while the war raged, the jet engine so seriously upset aircraft design that the need for dedicated jet-powered night fighters became clear. Both the British and Germans spent some effort on the topic, but as the Germans were on the defensive, their work was given a much higher priority. The Messerschmitt Me 262, the first operational jet fighter in the world, was adapted to the role, such as the installation of on-board FuG 218 Neptun high-VHF band radar and Hirschgeweih ("stag's antlers") antennae; intercepts were generally or entirely made using Wilde Sau methods, rather than AI radar-controlled interception. Several Me 262 pilots were able to attain a high number of kills in the type such as Oberleutnant Kurt Welter, who claimed a total of 25 Mosquitos downed during nighttime missions.

Other forces did not have the pressing need to move to the jet engine; Britain and the US were facing enemies with aircraft of even lower performance than their existing night fighters. However, the need for new designs was evident, and some low-level work started in the closing stages of the war, including the US contract for the Northrop F-89 Scorpion. When the Soviet plans to build an atomic bomb became known in the west in 1948, this project was still long from being ready to produce even a prototype, and in March 1949, they started development of both the North American F-86D Sabre and Lockheed F-94 Starfire as stop-gap measures. All of these fighters entered service during the early 1950s.

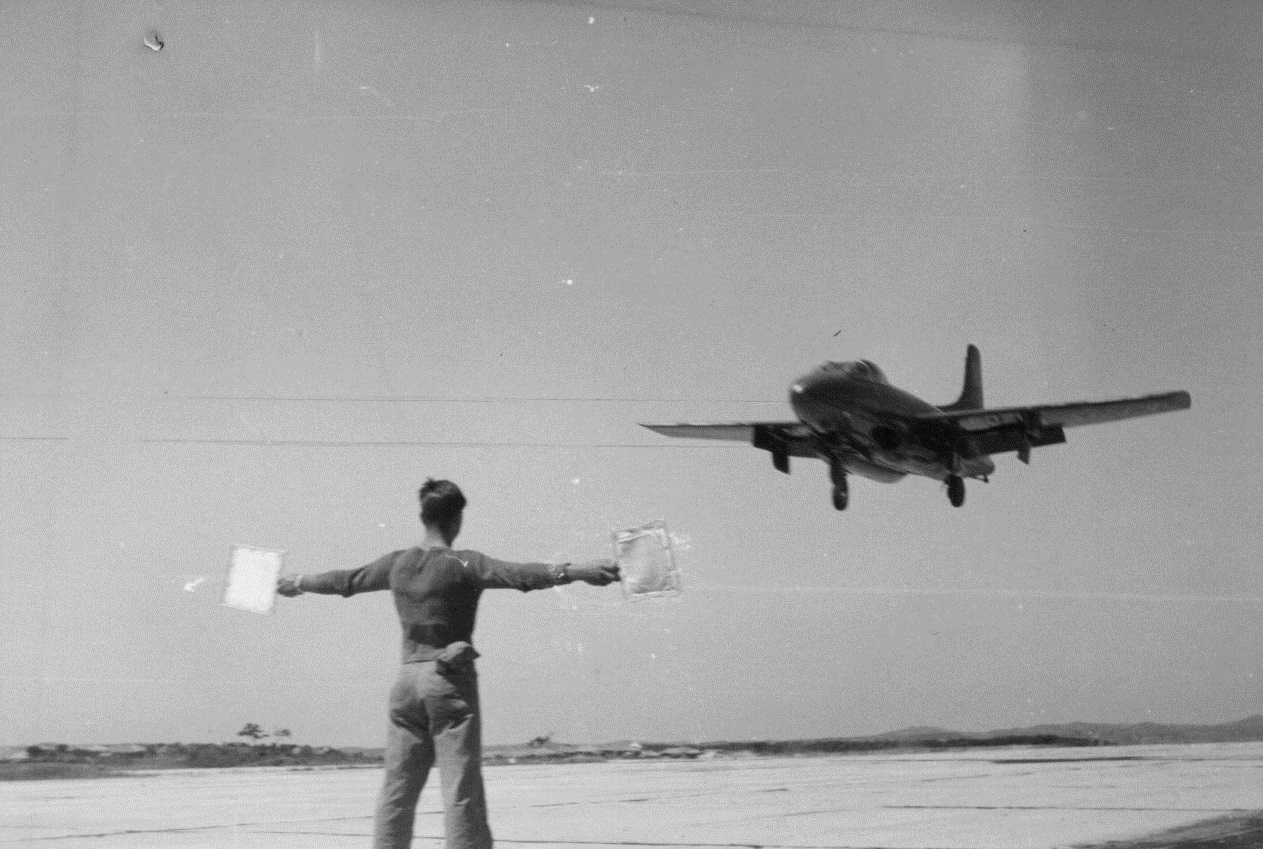
An F3D from VC-4 DET44(N) landing at K-6 airbase in Korea

In the Korean War, after the Starfire proved to be ineffective against the latest Soviet-supplied aircraft, Marine Corps Douglas F3D Skyknights shot down six aircraft, including five Mikoyan-Gurevich MiG-15s without loss, as the MiG-15s lacked radar to shoot down individual fighters, though they were effective against bomber formations at night.

During the immediate postwar era, the RAF launched studies into new fighter designs, but gave these projects relatively low priority. By the time of the Soviet bomb test, the night-fighter design was still strictly a paper project, and the existing Mosquito fleet was generally unable to intercept the Tupolev Tu-4 bomber it was expected to face. This led to rushed programs to introduce new, interim night-fighter designs; these efforts led to several night-fighter versions of the ubiquitous Gloster Meteor to replace the Mosquitos during the early 1950s. A similar conversion of the de Havilland Vampire was also introduced; this was originally developed by the company as a private venture and initially ordered by Egypt, instead the RAF took over the order to serve an interim measure between the retirement of the Mosquito night fighter and the Meteor night fighter's introduction. These types were also widely exported; Meteor night fighters were acquired by France, Syria, Egypt and Israel amongst others.

Both the Meteor and Vampire conversions were rapidly followed by a more capable night fighter in the form of the de Havilland Venom, the first model of which having been introduced during 1953. More advanced night fighter models of the Venom would follow, as well as of the navalised de Havilland Sea Venom, which served with the Royal Navy and other operators. An advanced night-fighter design was eventually introduced to RAF service in 1956 in the form of the Gloster Javelin, a delta wing aircraft capable of performing rapid ascents and attaining an altitude of 45,000 feet. Due to rapid advances in aircraft capabilities, the Javelin quickly became considered to be outdated and the type was retired during 1968. In Canada, Avro Canada developed its own night fighter, the CF-100 Canuck, which entered service with the Royal Canadian Air Force (RCAF) during 1952.

Into the 1960s, night fighters still existed as a separate class of aircraft. As they continued to grow in capability, radar-equipped interceptors could take on the role of night fighters, thus the class went into decline. Examples of these latter-day interceptor/night-fighters include the Avro Arrow, Convair F-106 Delta Dart, and English Electric Lightning.

During this transition period, the McDonnell Douglas F-4 Phantom II was offered to the US Navy; at the time, the Vought F-8 Crusader had already been accepted as a "day" dogfighter, while the subsonic McDonnell F3H Demon was the Navy's all-weather fighter. The Phantom was developed as the Navy's first supersonic, all-weather, radar-equipped fighter armed with radar-guided missiles. Compared to early air-superiority designs such as the F-100 or F-8, the massive Phantom had enough power from its twin J79 engines to prove adaptable as the preferred platform for fighting agile MiG-17 and MiG-21 fighters over the skies of Vietnam, as well as replacing the US Air Force Convair F-102 Delta Dagger and Convair F-106 Delta Dart for continental interception duties and the Republic F-105 Thunderchief as a medium fighter-bomber. The need for dogfighting spelled the end for the specialised Grumman F-111B, which was armed only with long-range AIM-54 Phoenix missiles for fleet defense against bombers. The Navy instead developed the Grumman F-14 Tomcat, which on top of the heavy Phoenix, retained the Phantom's versatility and improved agility for dogfighting. The McDonnell Douglas F-15 Eagle was also an interceptor with enhanced agility, but did not carry the Phoenix in preference to the role of an air-superiority fighter.

The reduced size and costs of avionics have allowed even smaller modern fighters to have night-interception capability. In the US Air Force's lightweight fighter program, the F-16 was originally envisaged as inexpensive day fighter, but quickly converted to an all-weather role. The similar McDonnell Douglas F/A-18 Hornet in its CF-18 variant for the RCAF, was ordered with a 0.6 Mcd night-identification light to enhance its night-interception capabilities.

== First World War ==
- Royal Aircraft Factory B.E.2 Night fighter
- Sopwith Camel "Comic" Night fighter
- Sopwith 1½ Strutter Night fighter
- Supermarine Nighthawk

== Second World War ==
=== Germany ===
- Arado Ar 68E-1
- Dornier Do 217J/N
- Focke-Wulf Ta 154
- Heinkel He 219
- Junkers Ju 88C/G
- Messerschmitt Bf 110D/F-4/G-4
- Messerschmitt Me 262 A-1a/U2, B-1a/U1
- Focke-Wulf Fw 189 A-1
- Focke-Wulf Fw 190 A-5/R11

=== Italy ===
- Fiat CR.42CN Falco
- CANT Z.1018/CN "Leone"
- Caproni-Vizzola F-5/CN
- Reggiane Re.2001CN Serie I, II, III "Falco"

=== Japan ===
- Aichi S1A Denko
- Kawasaki Ki-45 KAIc
- Mitsubishi Ki-46-III KAI
- Mitsubishi Ki-109
- Nakajima C6N1-S
- Nakajima J1N1-S
- Yokosuka D4Y2-S
- Yokosuka P1Y1-S

=== Hungary/Romania ===
- FIAT CR.42 "Falco"
- MÁVAG Héja
- Messerschmitt Bf 109F
- Messerschmitt Bf 110G-4d
- Messerschmitt Me 210Ca-1/N

=== Soviet Union ===
- Petlyakov Pe-3bis
- Yakovlev Yak-9M PVO

=== United Kingdom ===
- Douglas Havoc (US-built)
- Douglas Havoc (Turbinlite) (US-built)
- Boulton Paul Defiant Mk II
- Bristol Beaufighter
- Bristol Blenheim Mk IF
- de Havilland Mosquito NF series
- Fairey Firefly NF Mk 5
- Supermarine Spitfire

=== United States ===
- Douglas P-70
- Bristol Beaufighter (British supplied)
- Grumman F6F-3E/F6F-3N/F6F-5N Hellcat
- Lockheed P-38M "Night Lightning"
- Northrop P-61 Black Widow
- Vought F4U-2/F4U-4E/F4U-4N Corsair

=== France ===
- Mureaux 114/CN2
- Morane-Saulnier M.S. 408/CN
- Potez 631 C3/N

== Post-war ==
=== Canada ===
- Avro Canada CF-100

=== United Kingdom ===
- de Havilland Mosquito NF 36/38
- de Havilland Sea Hornet NF 21
- de Havilland Vampire NF 10/54
- de Havilland Venom NF 2/2A/3/51/54
- Gloster/Armstrong-Whitworth Meteor NF 11/12/14
- Gloster Javelin

=== United States ===
- Douglas F3D Skyknight
- Grumman F7F-1N/2N Tigercat
- Lockheed F-94 Starfire
- McDonnell F2H-2N/F2H-4 Banshee
- McDonnell F-101 Voodoo
- North American F-82F/G/H Twin Mustang
- North American F-86D/K/L Sabre
- Northrop F-89 Scorpion
- Vought F4U-5N/F4U-5NL Corsair/Goodyear FG-1E Corsair

== See also ==
- Heavy fighter
- Interceptor aircraft
