= Genheim =

- Ortsteil of Waldalgesheim
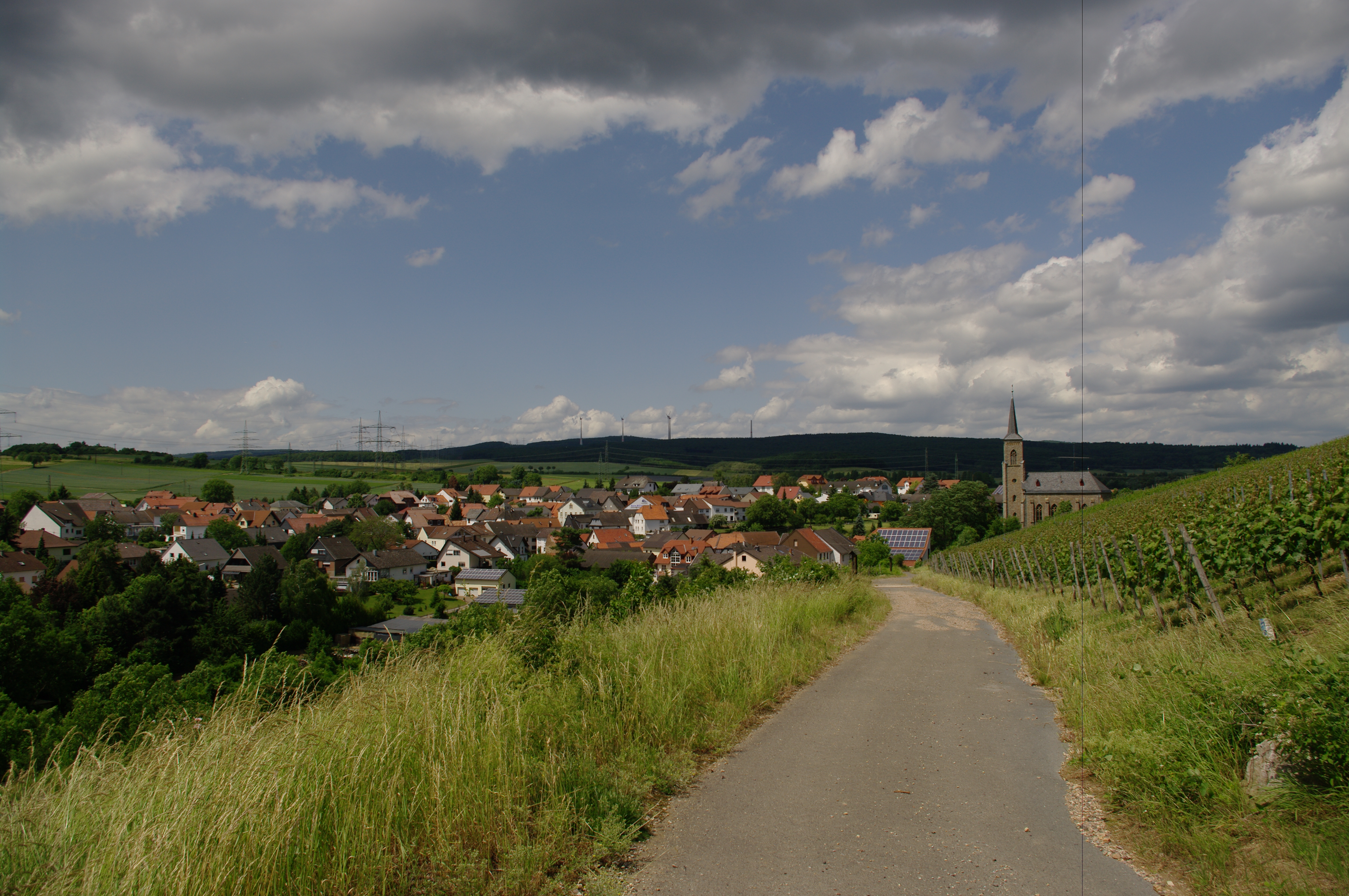
- Interactive map of Genheim
- Location within Germany Location within Rhineland-Palatinate
- Coordinates: 49°56′22″N 7°48′59″E
- Country: Germany
- State: Rhineland-Palatinate
- District: Mainz-Bingen
- Municipality: Waldalgesheim

Area
  - Total: 6.01 km^{2} (2.32 sq mi)
- Elevation: 243 m (797 ft)

Population
  - Total: 525
  - Density: 87.4/km^{2} (226/sq mi)
- Time zone: UTC+01:00 (CET)
  - Summer (DST): UTC+02:00 (CEST)
- Postal codes: 55425
- Dialling codes: 06724

Genheim is a village and an Ortsteil (subdivision) of the municipality Waldalgesheim in the district Mainz-Bingen in Rhineland-Palatinate, Germany.

== Geography ==
=== Location ===
Genheim is located on the southeast edge of the Hunsrück between Koblenz and Bad Kreuznach, south of the Bingen Forest (Binger Wald) and the west of the river Nahe, some 6 km west of Bingen.

=== Neighbouring villages ===
Genheim's neighbours are Waldalgesheim, Waldlaubersheim, Roth and Schweppenhausen.

== History ==
The first documented mention in the Lorsch codex was in 767 A.D. Formerly an independent municipality, it is part of the municipality Waldalgesheim since 1970.
