= Nachtjagdgruppe 10 =

- Active: 1944–1945
- Country: Nazi Germany
- Branch: Luftwaffe
- Type: Night Fighter
- Role: Experimental Unit

Commanders
- Notable commanders: Major Rudolf Schoenert

Insignia
- Identification symbol: Gruppenkennung of 1L

Nachtjagdgruppe 10 (NJGr 10) was a German Luftwaffe night fighter gruppe (group) during World War II. It was formed on 1 January 1944 at Werneuchen with 3 Staffel (squadrons). It was subordinated to the 1. Jagd-Division (1st fighter division), stationed at Döberitz. On 6 March 1945, NJGr 10 transferred to Liebenwalde and disbanded in April 1945. The remnants of NJGr 10 were absorbed by Nachtjagdgeschwader 5 (5th Night Fighter Wing). Its main task was to explore new and revised tactical deployment of night fighters, test the latest search and detection equipment in conjunction with the test site for radar equipment under combat conditions (Erprobung von Radarsysteme für die Nachtjagd), and place the anti-Mosquito effort under a more centralised command.

== 1./NJGr 10 ==
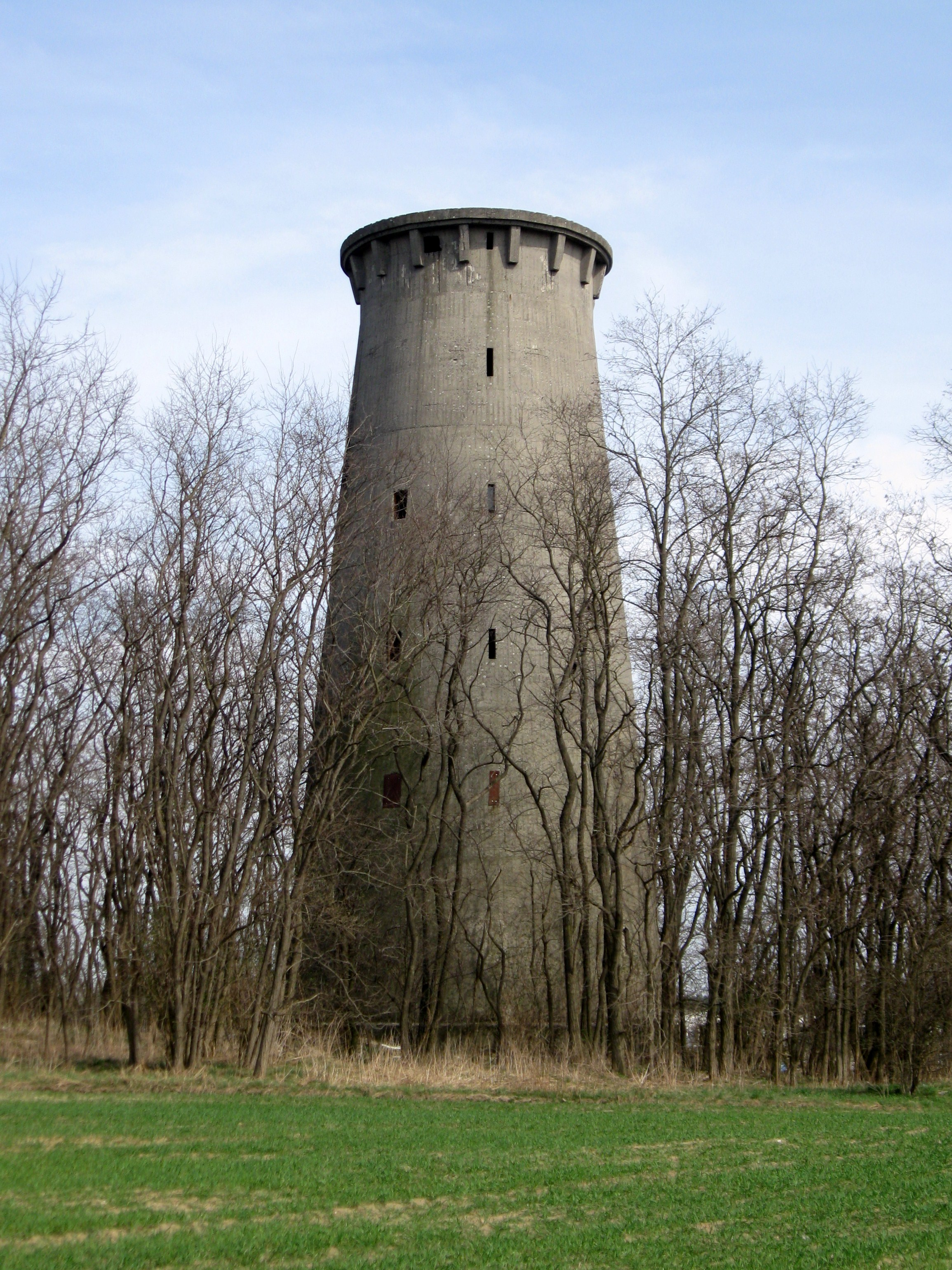
The radar tower of Weesow, part of the borough of Werneuchen, built in 1943/44.

1st Staffel was formed from parts of I/Jagdgeschwader 300 (1st Group of 300th Fighter Wing) and commanded by Hauptmann Friedrich-Karl Müller. 1/NJGr 10 was stationed in Werneuchen, flying both Focke-Wulf Fw 190 equipped with FuG 217 Neptun (Neptune) radar and Messerschmitt Bf 109 fighter aircraft and used Bonn-Hangelar as a forward airfield. On 28 August 1944 half of 1/NJGr 10 was redesignated 2/Nachtjagdgeschwader 11 (NJG 11—11th Night Fighter Wing). The remaining half was then based at Bonn-Hangelar and Darmstadt-Biblis. On 27 October 1944, the remainder of 1/NJGr 10 was redesignated 3/NJG 11, and a new 1/NJGr 10 was formed at Bonn-Hangelar.

== 2./NJGr 10 ==
2nd Staffel was stationed in both Werneuchen and Finow flying Bf 110s and Ju 88s.

== 3./NJGr 10 ==
3rd Staffel was stationed in Finsterwalde flying the He 219s and later the Ta 154. In November 1944 3/NJGr 10 relocated to Jüterbog.

== Commanding officers ==
- Major Rudolf Schoenert, 1 January 1944 – 6 March 1945
- Major Lüdtke, 6 March 1945 – 30 April 1945
