= Nachtjagdgeschwader 11 =

- Active: 1944 – 1945
- Country: Nazi Germany
- Branch: Luftwaffe
- Type: Night Fighter
- Role: Air superiority
- Size: Air Force Wing
- Engagements: World War II

Nachtjagdgeschwader 11 (NJG 11) was a Luftwaffe night fighter-wing of World War II. NJG 11 was formed on 20 August 1944 with one Gruppe (group) consisting of 2 Staffeln.

== Formation ==
1 staffel was formed from elements of 6./JG 300 and in January 1945 redesignated 7./NJG 11. 2 staffel and 3 staffel formed from 1./NJGr 10 and in January 1945 redesignated 1./NJG 11 and 8./NJG 11 respectively.

II./NJG 11 was formed in November 1944 from 10./JG 300. III./NJG 11 was formed in January 1945 and in March 1945 redesignated 2. NJG 11.

10. Staffel was formed on 28 January 1945 at Burg-Magdeburg from Sonderkommando Welter flying Messerschmitt Me 262 jet fighters.

NJG 11 was the Luftwaffe's only Nachtjagdgeschwader to exclusively fly single-engine, single-seat fighter aircraft in the Wilde Sau role. (excepting 10 staffel). During its existence the gruppen operated independently of each other

NJG 11 was reorganized on 30 March 1945. The Stab was disbanded and the Gruppen reduced to Staffeln which were assigned to Nachtjagdgeschwader 3 (NJG 3) and Nachtjagdgeschwader 5 (NJG 5).

== Operations 1944–45 ==
Earlier in 1944 the specialised units of JG 300 and NJGr 10 were tasked with countering the growing threat of the RAF de Havilland Mosquito units. The radar equipped fighter versions equipping No. 100 Group, Bomber Command were taking an increasing toll of the Luftwaffe's night fighters, and the 'Oboe'-equipped Pathfinder and light bomber versions were also proving difficult to intercept and shoot down. NJG 11 brought together the various single-seat high speed units into one Nachtjagdgeschwader to unify these efforts.

The Focke-Wulf Fw 190 A-8 and A-9 equipped with the FuG 217 or FuG 218 Neptun V radars were utilised by the unit, though several Bf 109 G-6, G-10 and G-14 models were also used.

Thus November saw the fighters of NJG 11 take up specialised high-speed high altitude interception operations against the RAF's Mosquito fighters, target markers and light bombers. Concentrating efforts over the Ruhr and Berlin, tactics were to create lighter conditions by setting up searchlight boxes, forming 'light horizons' to enable pilots to make visible contact with the enemy aircraft. Results were poor however, with only two Mosquitoes claimed over Berlin.

In December 1944 the piston-engined elements of NJG 11 gave up sustained anti-Mosquito operations and confined itself to illuminated target defence night fighting against the heavy bombers of the RAF.

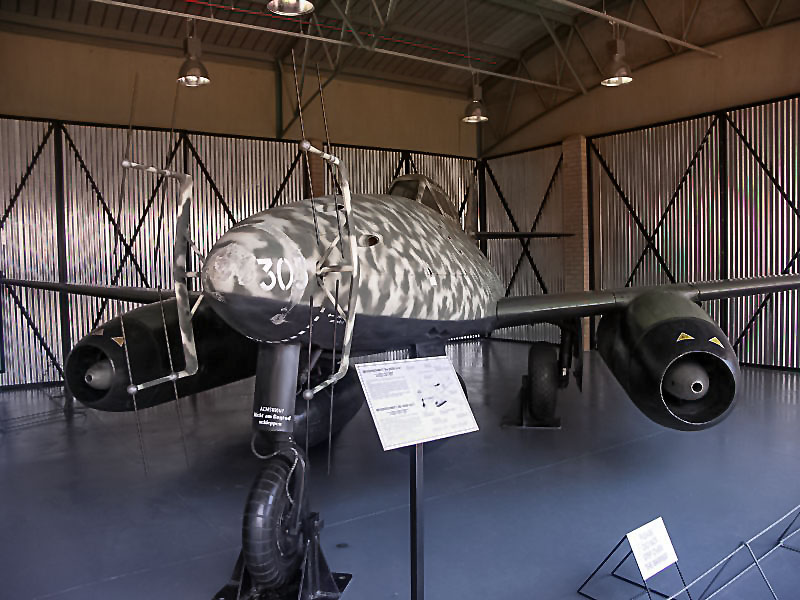
Radar equipped Me 262B-1a/U1 in the South African national museum of military history.

10./NJG 11 under Hauptmann Kurt Welter, an experienced Wilde Sau ace, commenced operations using a handful of single-seat Me 262 jets in December 1944. Seven two-seat conversion night fighter variants, designated Me 262B-1a/U1, were available by April 1945. To make room for the radar operator fuselage fuel capacity was sacrificed, and a pair of undernose hardpoints, one either side of the nosewheel well, for fitment of a pair of standard Luftwaffe 300 litre (79 US gallon) drop tanks were fitted. Following trials with radar fitted to a single-seater the two-seaters were equipped with the mid-VHF band FuG 218 Neptun V radar, with prominent Hirschgeweih (stag's antlers) eight-dipole aerials on the nose reducing the top speed by about 30 mph.

According to some sources from January 1945 to the end of the war the Me 262's of 10./NJG 11 claimed some 43 Mosquitoes by night and 5 P-38 and Mosquito photo-reconnaissance aircraft by day, although these figures do not tally with known Allied aircraft losses. Among them six Mosquitos by Feldwebel Karl-Heinz Becker and his radio operator in two weeks, two within three minutes of each other on the night of 23 March 1945.

The last kill by III./NJG 11 came on the 21 February 1945, when Obfw Frank in a Bf 109 G-14 shot down a Lancaster near Krefeld.
