= No. 692 Squadron RAF =

Defunct flying squadron of the Royal Air Force

No. 692 (Fellowship of the Bellows) Squadron RAF
- Active: 1 January 1944 – 20 September 1945
- Country: United Kingdom
- Branch: Royal Air Force
- Role: Light Bomber Squadron
- Part of: No. 8 Group RAF, Bomber Command
- Nickname: Fellowship of the Bellows
- Mottos: Latin: Polus Dum Sidera Pascet (Translation: "So long as the sky shall feed the stars")

Commanders
- Notable commanders: S/Ldr. (then) S.D. Watts, the first pilot to drop a 4,000 lbs "Cookie".

Insignia
- Squadron Badge heraldry: In front of a pair of wings conjoined in base, a dagger, point downwards
- Squadron Codes: P3 (Jan 1944 – Jun 1945)

Aircraft flown
- Bomber: de Havilland Mosquito

No. 692 Squadron RAF was a light bomber squadron of the Royal Air Force during the Second World War.

== History ==
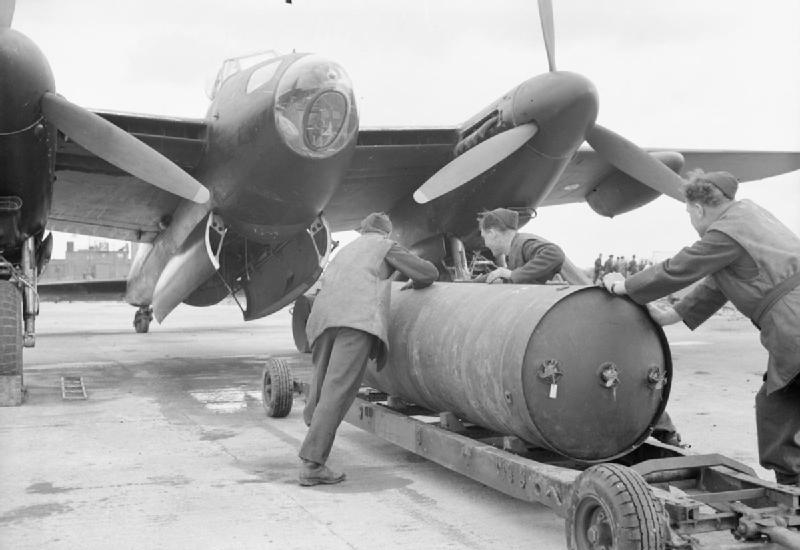
Loading a 4,000-lb "Cookie" onto a Mosquito B Mk IV at RAF Graveley

The squadron was formed on 1 January 1944 at RAF Graveley, Huntingdonshire as a light bomber unit, equipped with Mosquito Mk.IV bombers, as part of the Light Night Striking Force of No. 8 Group RAF in Bomber Command. It re-equipped with Mosquito Mk.XVI bombers from March 1944 and by June 1944 the squadron had completely switched over to the newer variant.

It was the first squadron to carry 4,000 lb bombs in Mosquitos, used in an attack on Düsseldorf. The squadron was also the first Mosquito unit to carry out minelaying operations. Most operations were at low level, including one mission when the squadron dropped 4,000 lb bombs into the mouth of tunnels in the Ardennes. At the end of the war the squadron was disbanded on 20 September 1945 at RAF Gransden Lodge, Cambridgeshire. The squadron had carried out 3,237 operational sorties (though one source claims a far lower number of sorties, 1,457) for the loss of 17 aircraft.

== Aircraft operated ==
Aircraft operated by no. 692 Squadron RAF, data from
| From | To | Aircraft | Variant |
|---|---|---|---|
| January 1944 | June 1944 | de Havilland Mosquito | Mk.IV |
| March 1944 | September 1945 | de Havilland Mosquito | Mk.XVI |

== Commanding officers ==
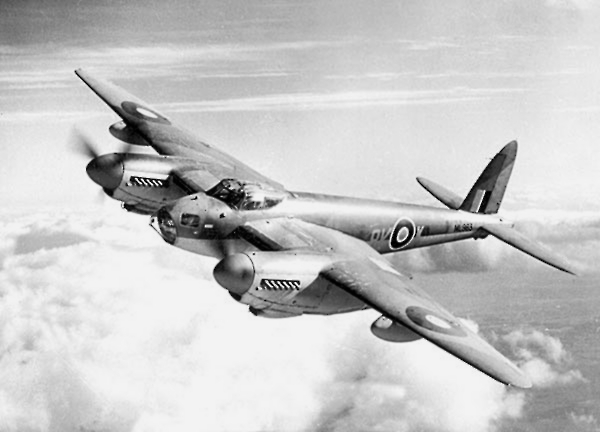
Though bearing the squadron markings of 571 Squadron here, this aircraft, Mosquito Mk.XVI ML963, was first issued to 109 Squadron on 9 March 1944, going on to 692 squadron on the 24 of the same month.

Officers commanding no. 692 Squadron RAF, data from
| From | To | Name |
|---|---|---|
| January 1944 | March 1944 | W/Cdr. W.G. Lockhart, DSO, DFC |
| March 1944 | July 1944 | W/Cdr. S.D. Watts, DFC (RNZAF) |
| July 1944 | September 1945 | W/Cdr. J. Northrop, DFC, AFC |

== Squadron Airfields ==
Stations and airfields used by No. 692 Squadron RAF, data from
| From | To | Name | Remark |
|---|---|---|---|
| 1 January 1944 | 4 June 1944 | RAF Graveley, Huntingdonshire | Formed here |
| 4 June 1944 | 20 September 1945 | RAF Gransden Lodge, Cambridgeshire | Disbanded here |

== See also ==
- List of Royal Air Force aircraft squadrons
