= Georg-Peter Eder =

German World War II flying ace (1921–1986)

- Eder as a Hauptmann
- Born: 8 March 1921; Oberdachstetten, Weimar Republic
- Died: 11 March 1986 (aged 65); Wiesbaden, West Germany
- Military career
- Allegiance: Nazi Germany
- Branch: Luftwaffe
- Service years: 1939–1945
- Rank: Major (major)
- Nickname: Schorsch
- Units: JG 51, JG 2, JG 1, JG 26, EKdo 262, Kommando Nowotny, JG 7
- Conflicts: See battles World War II: Operation Barbarossa; Western Front; Defense of the Reich; Invasion of Normandy
- Awards: Knight's Cross of the Iron Cross with Oak Leaves

Georg-Peter "Schorsch" Eder (8 March 1921 – 11 March 1986) was a German Luftwaffe military aviator and fighter ace during World War II. He is credited with 78 aerial victories achieved in 572 combat missions, including 150 combat missions with the Messerschmitt Me 262 jet fighter. This figure includes 10 aerial victories on the Eastern Front, and further 68 victories over the Western Allies, including 36 four-engined bombers.

Born in Oberdachstetten, Eder grew up in the Weimar Republic and Nazi Germany. He joined the military service in the Luftwaffe in 1939. Following flight training, he was posted to Jagdgeschwader 51 (JG 51—51st Fighter Wing) in late 1940. Flying with this wing, Eder claimed his first aerial victory on 22 June 1941, the first day of Operation Barbarossa, the German invasion of the Soviet Union. Following a ground accident in August 1941, he was assigned to a fighter pilot. In November 1942, Eder was posted to Jagdgeschwader 2 "Richthofen" (JG 2—2nd Fighter Wing) fighting on the Western Front. He was made Staffelkapitän (squadron leader) of 12. Staffel (12th squadron) of JG 26 in September 1941 and in February 1943. In November 1943, he was transferred to Jagdgeschwader 1 (JG 1—1st Fighter Wing) where he was given command of 6. Staffel, a position he held briefly until he was appointed Gruppenkommandeur (group commander) of II. Gruppe of JG 2 on 11 November. On 24 June 1944, he was awarded the Knight's Cross of the Iron Cross. In October, Eder was transferred to Kommando Nowotny, a Me 262 jet fighter unit tasked with testing its operational readiness. Following further aerial victories, he was awarded the Knight's Cross of the Iron Cross with Oak Leaves on 25 November 1944. He ended the war flying with Jagdgeschwader 7 (JG 7—7th Fighter Wing), the first operational jet fighter wing. After the war, Eder became a businessman and died on 11 March 1986 in Wiesbaden.

== Early life and career ==
Eder was born on 8 March 1921 in Oberdachstetten in Bavaria. After he attended the Grundschule, an elementary school, and Oberrealschule, a secondary school, he joined the military service of the Luftwaffe on 15 November 1939. Posted to the 4. Kompanie (4th company) of Fliegerausbildungs-Regiment 62 (62nd Flight Training Regiment) in Quedlinburg in the Harz region, he then attended the Luftkriegsschule 2 (LKS 2—2nd air war school) at Berlin-Gatow. On 1 April 1940, he was accepted as a Fahnenjunker (candidate). During his flight training, he was promoted to Fähnrich (officer cadet) on 1 September 1940.

== World War II ==
World War II in Europe began on Friday 1 September 1939 when German forces invaded Poland. Eder was posted to 4. Staffel (4th squadron) of Jagdgeschwader 51 (JG 51—51st Fighter Wing), a squadron of II. Gruppe, on 1 December 1940. At the time, II. Gruppe of JG 51 was undergoing a period of rest and replenishment at Mannheim-Sandhofen Airfield following the Battle of Britain. There, the Gruppe received the Messerschmitt Bf 109 E-7. The Gruppe returned to France on 14 February 1941 and was commanded by Hauptmann Josef Fözö while Eder's 4. Staffel was headed by Oberleutnant Erich Hohagen.

=== Operation Barbarossa ===
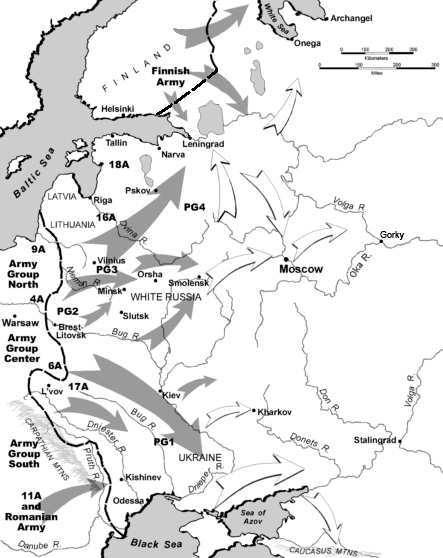
Barbarossa's attack plan

II. Gruppe of JG 51 was withdrawn from the Channel Front in early June 1941 and ordered to Dortmund where the unit was reequipped with the Bf 109 F series. On 10 June, II. Gruppe began transferring east and was located at Siedlce. On 22 June, German forces launched Operation Barbarossa, the German invasion of the Soviet Union. JG 51, under the command of Oberstleutnant Werner Mölders, was subordinated to II. Fliegerkorps (2nd Air Corps), which as part of Luftflotte 2 (Air Fleet 2). JG 51 area of operation during Operation Barbarossa was over the right flank of Army Group Center in the combat area of the 2nd Panzer Group as well as the 4th Army.

On the first day of the invasion, Eder claimed his first two aerial victories, a Polikarpov I-16 fighter and a Tupolev SB bomber shot down 09:23 and 09:35 respectively. For this feat, Eder received the Iron Cross 2nd Class (Eisernes Kreuz 2. Klasse) on 26 June. Eight days later, he shot down an Ilyushin DB-3 bomber for his third aerial victory in combat in the area of Babruysk. The German Army crossed the Berezina River on 4 July, and II. Gruppe was moved forward to an airfield at Babruysk, fighting on the Stalin Line in the area of Vitebsk-Orsha-Mogilev. On 11 July, Eder was awarded the Iron Cross 1st Class (Eisernes Kreuz 1. Klasse). German forces breached the Stalin Line and II. Gruppe was moved to an airfield at Stara Bychow, approximately 50 kilometres (31 miles) south of Mogilev on the Dnieper on 12 July. That day, the Gruppe flew multiple combat air patrols in support of the German beachhead on the eastern bank of the Dnieper in the area between Mogilev and Smolensk. That day, Eder claimed a Petlyakov Pe-2 bomber shot down. On 13 July, he claimed two aerial victories, a DB-3 bomber shot down at 10:07 and an I-16 fighter at 10:23, followed by another DB-3 bomber on 14 July. Eder was credited with another Pe-2 bomber shot down on 26 July and an I-16 fighter destroyed on 31 July.

On 5 August, II. Gruppe was moved to an airfield at Schatalowka, present-day Shatalovo air base, 40 kilometers (25 miles) southeast of Smolensk. On 9 August, Eder was credited with his tenth and last aerial victory on the Eastern Front when he claimed an I-18 shot down at 16:50. The German designation I-18 refers to the Mikoyan-Gurevich MiG-1 fighter. On 10 August, Eder's Bf 109 F-2 (Werknummer 9184—factory number) collided with a Junkers Ju 52 on the ground at Ponjatowka. Eder suffered a skull fracture and following convalescence, he was posted to the Jagdfliegerschule 2 (fighter pilot school) at Zerbst on 1 November 1941.

=== Western Front ===
Combat box of a 12-plane B-17 squadron. Three such boxes completed a 36-plane group box.: 1. Lead Element; 2. High Element; 3. Low Element; 4. Low Low Element

On 1 November 1942, Eder was posted to 7. Staffel (7th squadron) of Jagdgeschwader 2 "Richthofen" (JG 2—2nd Fighter Wing), a squadron of III. Gruppe of JG 2 named after the World War I fighter ace Manfred von Richthofen. That day, Oberleutnant Egon Mayer was appointed Gruppenkommandeur (group commander) of III. Gruppe while command of 7. Staffel was given to Hohagen who also joined the Geschwader that day. JG 2 was based in northern France and fought against the United States Army Air Forces (USAAF) under the leadership of Geschwaderkommodore (wing commander) Major Walter Oesau. At the time, III. Gruppe was equipped with the Focke-Wulf Fw 190 A-4 and some older A-3s. The Gruppe operated from various airfields in Brittany, France, providing fighter protection for the German U-boat bases along the Atlantic coast. Eder claimed his first aerial victory on the Western Front on 30 December when he shot down a Boeing B-17 Flying Fortress bomber on a mission to bomb Lorient.

Together with Mayer, Eder developed the head-on attack as the most effective tactic against the Allied daylight heavy combat box formations of B-17s and Consolidated B-24 Liberator bombers. The concept was based on a Kette (chain), three aircraft flying in a "V" formation, attacking from ahead and to the left. When in range, the attackers opened fire with a deflection burst, aiming in front of the enemy aircraft. Following the attack, the pilots would pull up sharply to the left or right. This gave the attacking fighters the best chance of avoiding the massed firepower of the bombers' guns.

On 3 January 1943, the USAAF VIII Bomber Command attacked the U-boat base at Saint-Nazaire. III. Gruppe managed to fend off some of the bombers, claiming sixteen B-17 bombers shot down over sea, including one by Eder. The USAAF reported the loss of seven bombers during the attack. The U-boat base at Lorient was the target of the VIII Bomber Command on 23 January. III. Gruppe, supported by 9. Staffel of Jagdgeschwader 26 "Schlageter" (JG 26—26th Fighter Wing), claimed seven aerial victories, of which one B-17 was claimed shot down by Eder. On 9 February, the Gruppenstab (headquarters unit) of III. Gruppe, 7. Staffel and 9. Staffel were ordered to Berck-sur-Mer where they were placed under the command of JG 26. On 13 February, the Royal Air Force (RAF) Fighter Command targeted the west coast of Pas-de-Calais with three "Rodeos" and one "Circus". In defense of this attack, Eder claimed a RAF Supermarine Spitfire fighter shot down northwest of Boulogne.

=== Squadron leader ===
In February, a new 12. Staffel of JG 2 was created at the airfield at Beaumont-le-Roger. On 15 February, Eder was appointed its Staffelkapitän (squadron leader) of this newly created Staffel and tasked with bringing it to operational readiness. The plan was to equip this Staffel with a full complement of 16 pilots and Bf 109 Gs. Initially, Eder was given eight Fw 190 A-2 and A-3s, as well as two Bf 109 G-1 aircraft, and subordinated and accountable to the Stab of JG 2. On 8 March, Eder claimed the first aerial victory credited to the 12. Staffel when he shot down a Spitfire near Le Petit-Quevilly. That day, VIII Bomber Command sent 54 B-17 bombers to Rennes and 16 B-24 bombers to the Rouen railroad yards. The attack on Rouen was protected by 16 RAF Spitfire squadrons, supported by a Spitfire sweep of the 4th Fighter Group. On 12 March, he shot down another Spitfire 38 km (24 mi) northwest of Fécamp.

On 28 March, VIII Bomber Command dispatched 70 B-17 bombers on a mission to bomb the Rouen railroad yards again. The escorting Spitfire fighters missed their rendezvous point with the bombers, leaving the bombers unprotected. II. Gruppe of JG 26 and Eder's 12. Staffel of JG 2 intercepted the bombers, damaging nine and one was shot down by Eder. Following combat with a B-17, he was injured by the return fire but managed to make a forced landing of his Bf 109 G-4 (Werknummer 14988) at Beaumont-le-Roger airfield. By end of April, 12. Staffel had received their full complement of 16 Bf 109 G-6 fighters. Recovered from his injuries, Eder led his Staffel against a USAAF attack on the Potez aircraft plant at Albert. 12. Staffel operated autonomously from other Luftwaffe units and claimed a B-17 bomber and a Republic P-47 Thunderbolt fighter shot down for the loss of three aircraft and two pilots killed in action. Eder was credited with the destruction of the P-47, shot down west of Étaples.

On 29 May, the USAAF targeted Rennes, Saint-Nazaire and La Pallice. Defending against this attack, 12. Staffel claimed three B-17 bombers shot down in combat over sea off Paimpol, including one claim by Eder. He was awarded the Honour Goblet of the Luftwaffe (Ehrenpokal der Luftwaffe) on 25 June. The next day, he was credited with the destruction of a Spitfire 40 km (25 mi) north of Fécamp. On 29 June, Eder led his Staffel against USAAF bombers, losing two aircraft, one pilot killed in action and two further were wounded, while Eder claimed a B-17 shot down north of Saint-Valery.

Eder shot down a Hawker Typhoon west of Hesdin on 29 August. Two days later, he was awarded the German Cross in Gold (Deutsches Kreuz in Gold). On 5 September 1943, he was transferred to 5. Staffel of JG 2, taking command of the Staffel after its former commander Leutnant Kurt Goltzsch was wounded the day before. On 5 November, Eder was forced to bail out of his Bf 109 G-6 (Werknummer 20733) after engine failure near Mons, Belgium and was again injured.

=== Defense of the Reich ===
Following his recovery from injuries sustained on 5 November 1943, Eder was posted to the II. Gruppe of Jagdgeschwader 1 (JG 1—1st Fighter Wing) under the command of Hauptmann Hermann Segatz in February 1944. The Gruppe, which was fighting in Defense of the Reich, was based in Wunstorf in northern Germany. Following the death of Segatz, Major Heinrich Bär was given command of the Gruppe on 9 March. Bär, who had previously commanded 6. Staffel, was then in consequence succeeded by Eder. Eder claimed his first aerial victory with JG 1 on 8 April when the USAAF Eighth Air Force, formerly known as VIII Bomber Command, attacked German airfields in northwestern Germany as well as the German aircraft industry in Braunschweig. II. Gruppe attacked the bombers in the vicinity of Salzwedel where Eder shot down one of the B-24 bombers.

On 11 April, Eder claimed an aerial victory over a B-17 near Fallersleben. That day, the USAAF Eighth Air Force had sent 917 heavy bombers against the German aircraft industry in Oschersleben, Bernburg, Halberstadt, Sorau, present-day Żary, Poland, Cottbus and Arnimswalde, present-day Załom, Poland.He bailed out of his Fw 190 A-7 (Werknummer 430645) during combat with P-47 fighters over Göttingen on 19 April. On 8 May, he claimed a B-24 shot down but made a forced landing at Vechta in his Fw 190 A-8 (Werknummer 170071).

=== Group commander ===
On 11 May 1944, the Geschwaderkommodore of JG 1, Oberst Oesau, who had commanded JG 1 since November 1943, was killed in action. The following day, Bär was temporarily appointed as his successor. In consequence, Eder was given the position Gruppenkommandeur of II. Gruppe. In preparation of the Normandy landings, Eighth Air Force targeted the German fuel industry on 12 May. That day, 886 heavy-bombers escorted by 980 fighter aircraft, targeted the hydrogenation factories at Leuna, Merseburg, Böhlen, Zeitz and Brüx, present-day Most in the Czech Republic. Eder vectored his Gruppe in a consolidated attack on the bombers. The Gruppe claimed five bombers shot down plus a further P-47 destroyed, for the price of five pilots killed in action. Eder accounted for one of the bombers destroyed when he shot down a B-24 in the area of the Eifel. Following the attack, his Fw 190 had engine problems resulting in an emergency landing at Mannheim-Sandhofen Airfield. The USAAF targeted the German aircraft industry on 29 May. The Eighth Air Force sent 993 heavy bombers, escorted by 1,265 fighters, to factories in Leipzig, Sorau, and Posen, to the airfield at Tutow, as well as the hydrogenation factory at Pölitz. At the same time, the Fifteenth Air Force attacked similar targets in southern Germany and Austria. JG 1 was scrambled shortly after 11:00 and met up near Dessau. In frontal attack, pilots of I. and II. Gruppe claimed nine B-17 bombers shot down. While I. Gruppe came away unscathed, II. Gruppe lost one pilot killed in action and two further were wounded. Eder, who had shot down a B-17 in the vicinity of Görlitz, crashed his Fw 190 A-8 (Werknummer 730386) during the landing at Cottbus. The airfield was under attack at the time of the landing and Eder collided with a parked Siebel aircraft.

The Western Allies of World War II launched the invasion of Normandy in the early morning o 6 June 1944. At 16:25, II. Gruppe of JG 1, with a strength of 32 Fw 190 fighters under the leadership of Eder, relocated from Störmede to an airfield at Montdidier, France. That evening, II. Gruppe was then ordered to Le Mans Airfield. The following day, the Gruppe flew its first combat missions during the Normandy campaign, losing two aircraft without claiming any aerial victories. On 8 June, Eder headed II. Gruppe in an anti shipping mission against the Allied landing fleet near Deauville and Trouville on southern bank of the Baie de la Seine. On 24 June, Eder received the Knight's Cross of the Iron Cross (Ritterkreuz des Eisernen Kreuzes).

On 11 August 1944, Eder temporarily took command of 6. Staffel of JG 26, replacing Leutnant Adolf Glunz who was off operations at the time. Attacking Allied armour near Dreux on 17 August Eder shot down a Spitfire at low level; it crashed between two M4 Sherman tanks, destroying them. Shortly after that he shot down another Spitfire, which crashed on another tank, setting it on fire.

On 4 September, Eder was appointed Gruppenkommandeur II. Gruppe of JG 26 after the unit's former Gruppenkommandeur Hauptmann Emil Lang was killed in action against USAAF Thunderbolts over St Trond. On 8 October, Eder was transferred to Kommando Nowotny, the first operational Messerschmitt Me 262 jet fighter unit named after its commander Major Walter Nowotny. He was replaced by Major Anton Hackl as commander of II. Gruppe of JG 26. (Note: According to Forsyth, Eder had already been transferred to Erprobungskommando 262 in September 1944. This experimental test unit later formed the nucleus of Kommando Nowotny.)

=== Flying the Messerschmitt Me 262 ===
Kommando Nowotny was made up of three Staffeln and based at Achmer Airfield. 1. Staffel was headed by Oberleutnant Paul Bley, 2. Staffel by Oberleutnant Alfred Teumer, and Eder was given command of 3. Staffel. By late September 1944, Kommando Nowotny had approximately 30 Me 262s. As a unit, the Kommando flew three combat missions between 3 October and 24 October.

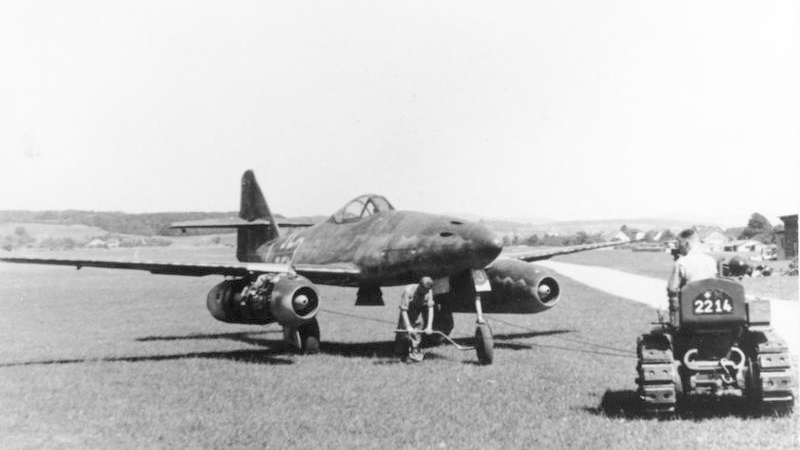
Me 262 A, circa 1945

It is difficult to establish the exact number of aerial victories claimed by Eder while flying the Me 262 as various sources provide contradicting information. Heaton and Lewis list him with two B-17 bombers shot down on 4 October, B-17 (serial number 44-8586) from the 97th Bombardment Group and B-17 (serial number 44-8043) from the 2nd Bombardment Group - however these claims are highly doubtful as 44-8586 returned to base after a partial crew-bail out over Munich, with 44-8043 was a clear flak kill. According to Harvey, Eder claimed his first aerial victory on the Me 262 on 6 October when he shot down a Lockheed P-38 Lightning F-5 reconnaissance aircraft from the 7th Photographic Group. Authors Morgan and Weal, credit Eder with his first victory on the Me 262 on 13 November 1944. In this account, Eder flew a mission from Achmer Airfield and encountered a P-38. Misjudging the closing speed, he collided with the P-38. The damage to his Me 262 was minimal while the P-38 crashed near Schleißheim. Without an exact date, Boehme indicates that Eder was credited with eleven aerial victories flying the Me 262 in the timeframe 1 October 1944 until 1 January 1945, including the claim over a P-38, bringing his total to 64 claims. Bley was killed in a flying accident on 28 October when his Me 262 A-1 (Werknummer 110481) suffered engine failure following a bird strike during takeoff. In consequence, Eder was given command of 1. Staffel of Kommando Nowotny.

Nowotny was killed in action on 8 November which marked the end of Kommando Nowotny. Following Nowotny's death, Eder then briefly led the Kommando until it was renamed to III. Gruppe of Ergänzungs-Jagdgeschwader 2 and withdrawn from combat. Harvey states that on 11 November, leading five Me 262s, Eder claimed two B-17 bombers and a North American P-51 Mustang escort fighter in combat near Frankfurt. On 19 November, the pilots of Kommando Nowotny formed the nucleus of III. Gruppe of Jagdgeschwader 7 (JG 7—7th Fighter Wing), the first operational jet fighter wing. Now based at Lechfeld Airfield, III. Gruppe was placed on the command of Major Hohagen, Eder's former Staffelkapitän with JG 51. The three Staffeln of Kommando Nowotny were redesignated to 9., 10., and 11. Staffel of JG 7, with Eder in command of the 9. Staffel.

Eder was awarded the Knight's Cross of the Iron Cross with Oak Leaves (Ritterkreuz des Eisernen Kreuzes mit Eichenlaub) on 25 November 1944 for some 60 victories. He was the 663rd member of the German armed forces to be so honored. On 17 January 1945, Eder claimed a B-17 shot down. This B-17 may have been from the 351st Bombardment Group on mission to Paderborn. (Note: According to Boehme, this claim may also have been dated on 14 or 17 January.) Eder may have shot down two P-47 fighters on 3 February. On 9 February, during an attack of the Eighth Air Force on synthetic oil plants and transportation, Eder shot down a B-17 bomber.

On 17 February, Eder, together with Oberfeldwebel Helmut Zander and Oberfeldwebel Hermann Buchner took off from Parchim to intercept a bomber formation. They intercepted the bomber formation south of Bremen when his Me 262 was hit by the defensive gunfire in the left engine, setting the engine and wing on fire. Forced to bail out, Eder struck his head and leg on the aircraft. He was picked up and taken to a hospital with a broken leg and head injuries. Following convalescence, Eder was back with III. Gruppe of JG 7 and claimed a B-17 shot down near Berlin on 17 April 1945. The B-17 was named The Towering Titan and belonged to the 305th Bombardment Group. According to Harvey, this was his 25th claim flying the Me 262.

== Later life ==
After World War II, Eder became a businessman in Wiesbaden. Eder befriended and confirmed two aerial victories claimed by First Lieutenant Urban L. Drew of the USAAF 375th Fighter Squadron. Drew had claimed two Me 262 fighters shot down on 7 October 1944. These two aerial victories were not confirmed at the time. Eder, who had observed the combat from the ground, confirmed these two claims after the war, resulting in the presentation of the Air Force Cross in May 1983. Eder died on 11 March 1986 in Wiesbaden.

== Summary of career ==
=== Aerial victory claims ===
According to US historian David T. Zabecki, Eder was credited with 78 aerial victories. Obermaier states that he flew 572 combat missions of which 150 were with the Messerschmitt Me 262. On the Eastern Front, he claimed 10 victories and on the Western Front 68, of which 36 were four-engined bombers. Mathews and Foreman, authors of Luftwaffe Aces — Biographies and Victory Claims, researched the German Federal Archives and state that he claimed 75 aerial victories. The authors list 48 aerial victories plus further ten unconfirmed claims. This figure includes ten claims on the Eastern Front, more than 41 claims on the Western Front, including more than 23 four-engined bombers. It is possible that Eder claimed more than 21 victories flying the Me 262. According to Boehme, Eder was credited with eleven aerial victories flying the Me 262 in the timeframe 1 October 1944 until 1 January 1945, bringing his total to 64 claims.

Victory claims were logged to a map-reference (PQ = Planquadrat), for example "PQ 14 West 4857". The Luftwaffe grid map (Jägermeldenetz) covered all of Europe, western Russia and North Africa and was composed of rectangles measuring 15 minutes of latitude by 30 minutes of longitude, an area of about 360 square miles (930 km^{2}). These sectors were then subdivided into 36 smaller units to give a location area 3 km × 4 km (1.9 mi × 2.5 mi) in size.

Chronicle of aerial victories
This and the – (dash) indicates unconfirmed aerial victory claims for which Eder did not receive credit. This along with the * (asterisk) indicates an Herausschuss (separation shot)—a severely damaged heavy bomber forced to separate from his combat box which was counted as an aerial victory. This along with the & (ampersand) indicates an endgültige Vernichtung (final destruction)—a coup de grâce inflicted on an already damaged heavy bomber. This and the ? (question mark) indicates information discrepancies listed by Forsyth, Prien, Stemmer, Rodeike, Bock, Mathews and Foreman.
Claim	Date	Time	Type	Location	Claim	Date	Time	Type	Location
– 4. Staffel of Jagdgeschwader 51 – Operation Barbarossa — 22 June – 9 August 1941
1	22 June 1941	09:23	I-16		6	13 July 1941	10:23? (Note: According to Mathews and Foreman claimed at 10:25.)	I-16	
2	22 June 1941	09:35	SB-2		7	14 July 1941	11:15	DB-3	
3	30 June 1941	17:31	DB-3		8	26 July 1941	18:43	Pe-2	
4	12 July 1941	07:45	Pe-2		9	31 July 1941	08:35	I-16	
5	13 July 1941	10:07	DB-3		10	9 August 1941	16:50	I-18? (Note: According to Mathews and Foreman claimed as a Polikarpov I-16.)	
– 7. Staffel of Jagdgeschwader 2 "Richthofen" – Western Front — December 1942
11	30 December 1942	11:55	B-17	PQ 14 West 4857					
– 7. Staffel of Jagdgeschwader 2 "Richthofen" – Western Front — 1 January – 15 February 1943
12	3 January 1943	11:35	B-17	PQ 14 West 3883	14	13 February 1943	09:57	Spitfire	northwest of Boulogne
13	23 January 1943	13:55	B-17	east of Pontivy; PQ 14 West 3978					
– 12. Staffel of Jagdgeschwader 2 "Richthofen" – Western Front — 15 February – 5 September 1943
— ? (Note: This unconfirmed claim is not listed by Prien, Stemmer, Rodeike and Bock.)	15 February 1943	14:07	B-17		23	10 July 1943	08:28	Spitfire	northwest of Fécamp; PQ 05 Ost 0015
15	8 March 1943	14:02	Spitfire	Le Petit-Quevilly	24	10 July 1943	08:32	B-17	northwest of Le Havre; PQ 05 Ost 0186
16	12 March 1943	13:05	Spitfire	38 km (24 mi) northwest of Fécamp	25	14 July 1943	07:52	B-17	PQ 05 Ost 1077, east of Berck; PQ 05 Ost 1077
17	28 March 1943	13:05	B-17	northwest of Dieppe; PQ 05 Ost 1887	— ? (Note: According to Mathews and Foreman this claim is confirmed as a shared aerial victory.)	14 July 1943	08:15	B-17&	Goussainville
18	13 May 1943	16:35	P-47	west of Étaples; PQ 05 Ost 1139	26	16 July 1943	20:25	Spitfire	25 km (16 mi) west of the Somme Estuary; PQ 05 Ost 1172
19	29 May 1943	17:46	B-17	PQ 15 West 3072; PQ 14 West 1746	27	30 July 1943	10:50	P-47	PQ 05 Ost 3225; PQ 05 Ost 3225
20	26 June 1943	18:02	Spitfire	40 km (25 mi) north of Fécamp; PQ 05 Ost 0175	28	30 July 1943	11:30? (Note: According to Mathews and Foreman claimed at 11:00.)	B-17*	PQ 05 Ost 3211; PQ 05 Ost 3211
21	29 June 1943	20:39	B-17	north of Saint-Valery; PQ 05 Ost 0168	29	29 August 1943	—	Typhoon	west of Hesdin
22	4 July 1943	12:32	B-17	PQ 14 West 0951, Alençon; PQ 05 Ost 0951					
– 5. Staffel of Jagdgeschwader 2 "Richthofen" – Western Front — 5 September – 5 November 1943
30? (Note: This claim is not listed by Mathews and Foreman.)	6 September 1943	13:25	B-17	5 km (3.1 mi) northwest of Fécamp	32?	2 October 1943	—	Spitfire	
31?	8 September 1943	10:40	Spitfire	5 km (3.1 mi) northeast of Berck	33?	3 October 1943	—	Spitfire	Dieppe
– 6. Staffel of Jagdgeschwader 1 – Defense of the Reich — 5 September – 5 November 1943
34	8 April 1944	13:51	B-24	PQ 15 Ost S/EF/EB, southwest of Salzwedel	39? (Note: According to Mathews and Foreman this claim is unconfirmed.)	22 April 1944	18:56	P-47	PQ 05 Ost S/JQ-8, north of Hamm
35	9 April 1944	10:58	B-24	PQ 15 Ost N/SB, Bay of Kiel	40	24 April 1944	12:47	B-17*	PQ 04 Ost N/AQ/BR, vicinity of Strasbourg
36	9 April 1944	11:10	P-47	PQ 15 Ost N/SA/SB, Bay of Kiel	41	29 April 1944	10:58	B-17	PQ 15 Ost S/GB-7, east of Braunschweig
37	11 April 1944	11:00	B-17	PQ 15 Ost S/FB, 15 km (9.3 mi) north of Fallersleben	42	29 April 1944	11:05	P-47	PQ 15 Ost S/HB-1, southeast of Braunschweig
38	13 April 1944	13:40? (Note: According to Mathews and Foreman claimed at 13:57.)	B-17	PQ 05 Ost S/RS, vicinity of Darmstadt	43	8 May 1944	09:38	B-24	PQ 05 Ost S/FS/ET, southwest of Verden
– Stab II. Gruppe of Jagdgeschwader 1 – Defense of the Reich — 5 September – 5 November 1943
44	12 May 1944	12:18	B-24	PQ 05 S/PO/PN, in the area of the Eifel	47	19 May 1944	13:55? (Note: According to Mathews and Foreman claimed at 12:55.)	P-47	PQ 05 Ost S/FT/GT, vicinity of Nienburg
45	19 May 1944	12:45	B-24	PQ 05 Ost S/FQ/FR, vicinity of Quakenbrück	48	22 May 1944	13:10	P-38	PQ 15 Ost N/SA/SB, Bay of Kiel
46	19 May 1944	12:55	P-47	PQ 05 Ost S/FT/GT, vicinity of Nienburg	49	29 May 1944	12:35	B-17	PQ 15 Ost S/KJ/KM//MJ/MM, vicinity of Görlitz/Bautzen
– 6. Staffel of Jagdgeschwader 26 "Schlageter" – Defense of the Reich — 11 August – 3 September 1944
50	15 August 1944	12:38	P-47	Rambouillet (BD)	52	17 August 1944	11:53	Spitfire	Rambouillet (BC6-BD4)
51	15 August 1944	12:40	P-47	Rambouillet (BD)	53	17 August 1944	11:53	Spitfire	Rambouillet (BC6-BD4)
– Erprobungskommando 262 – Defense of the Reich — September – October 1944
?	12 September 1944	—	B-17		?	24 September 1944	—	B-17	
?	12 September 1944	—	B-17		?	28 September 1944	—	B-17	
?	12 September 1944	—	B-17		?	4 October 1944	—	B-17	
?	24 September 1944	—	B-17		?	4 October 1944	—	B-17	
?	24 September 1944	—	B-17						
– Kommando Nowotny – Defense of the Reich — October – November 1944
—	6 October 1944	—	P-38		—	11 November 1944	—	B-17	
—	9 November 1944	—	P-51		—	11 November 1944	—	B-17	
—	9 November 1944	—	P-51		—	11 November 1944	—	P-51	
– 9. Staffel of Jagdgeschwader 7 – Defense of the Reich — January – February 1945
—	1 January 1945	—	B-17		?	3 February 1945	—	P-47	
—	1 January 1945	—	B-17		?	3 February 1945	—	P-47	
—	14 January 1945	—	B-17		?	9 February 1945	—	B-17	vicinity of Berlin
	17 January 1945	—	B-17						
– III. Gruppe of Jagdgeschwader 7 – Defense of the Reich — 11 August – 3 September 1944
?	17 April 1945	—	B-17						

=== Awards ===
- Iron Cross (1939)
  - 2nd Class (26 June 1941)
  - 1st Class (11 July 1941)
- Honour Goblet of the Luftwaffe on 25 June 1943 as Leutnant and pilot (Note: According to Obermaier on 16 June 1943.)
- German Cross in Gold on 31 August 1943 as Oberleutnant in the 12./Jagdgeschwader 2
- Knight's Cross of the Iron Cross with Oak Leaves
  - Knight's Cross on 24 June 1944 as Oberleutnant and Staffelkapitän of the 6./Jagdgeschwader 1
  - 663rd Oak Leaves on 25 November 1944 as Hauptmann and Staffelkapitän of the 6./Jagdgeschwader 1

=== Promotions ===
1 April 1940:	Fahnenjunker (Cadet)
1 September 1940:	Fähnrich (Ensign)
1 February 1941:	Oberfähnrich (Senior Ensign)
1 April 1941:	Leutnant (Second Lieutenant)
1 July 1943:	Oberleutnant (First Lieutenant)
1 July 1944:	Hauptmann (Captain)
1 February 1945:	Major (Major) with a rank age backdated to 1 December 1944
