= Urban L. Drew =

Fighter pilot in the United States Army Air Force; WWII flying ace

Urban Leonard Drew
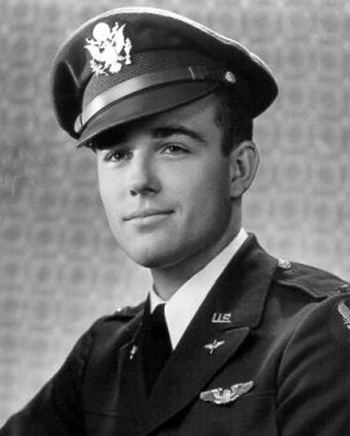
- Born: March 21, 1924; Detroit, Michigan, U.S.
- Died: April 3, 2013 (aged 89); Vista, California, U.S.
- Burial place: Arlington National Cemetery
- Military career
- Allegiance: United States
- Branch: United States Army Air Forces; United States Air Force; Michigan Air National Guard
- Service years: 1942–1950
- Rank: Major
- Nickname: Ben
- Units: 361st Fighter Group; 414th Fighter Group
- Commands: 375th Fighter Squadron
- Conflicts: World War II
- Awards: Air Force Cross; Distinguished Flying Cross (2); Air Medal (14)

Urban Leonard Drew (March 21, 1924 – April 3, 2013), known as Ben Drew, was a fighter pilot in the United States Army Air Forces and a flying ace of World War II. He was the first and the only Allied pilot to shoot down two Luftwaffe jet-powered Me 262 aircraft in a single mission while flying a propeller-driven North American P-51 Mustang. He received the Air Force Cross for the mission in 1983.

== Early life ==
Drew was born in Detroit, Michigan in 1924 and raised along with a younger brother by their schoolteacher mother. His father died when Drew was at the age of 3. He received his education at Wayne University and the University of Michigan, graduating with a degree in Political Science.

Three months after the attack on Pearl Harbor, at the age of eighteen, Drew joined the United States Army Air Forces and commenced pilot training.

== Military service ==
=== World War II ===
He enlisted in the United States Army Air Forces on May 14, 1942, and entered the Aviation Cadet Program in October 1942. Drew was commissioned a 2d Lt and awarded his pilot wings in Marianna Army Field on October 1, 1943, and began training as an instructor pilot for the North American P-51 Mustang at Bartow Field and then served as a P-51 Mustang instructor pilot with the 56th Fighter Squadron of the 54th Fighter Group.

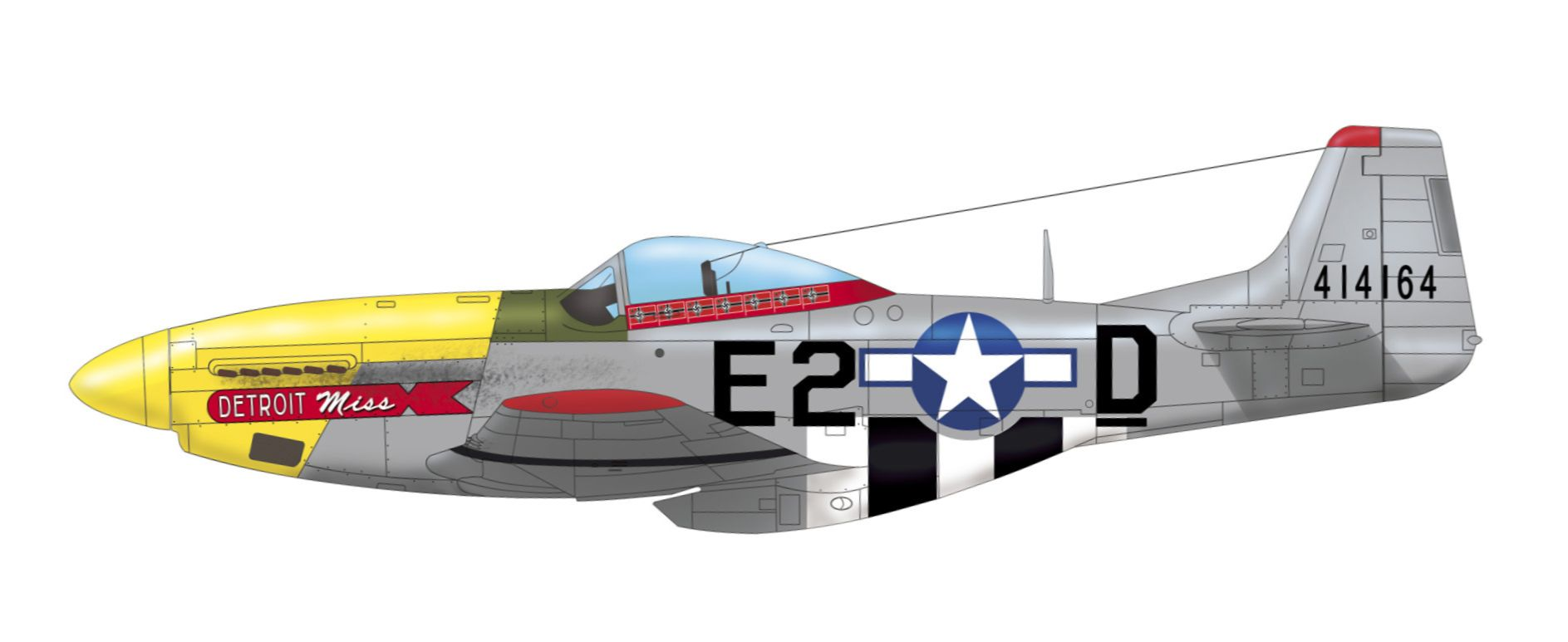
P-51 Mustang 'Detroit Miss'

He went overseas in May 1944 and was assigned to the 375th Fighter Squadron of the 361st Fighter Group, which was stationed at RAF Bottisham and later at RAF Little Walden. During his tour with the 361st Fighter Group, which was commonly known as "Yellowjackets", Drew completed 75 missions, rising to command of "A" Flight and the 375th Fighter Squadron. He would be officially credited with six aerial victories during his combat tour. "Detroit Miss", coded E2-D was his personal P-51, during his tour with 361st Fighter Group.

He was credited with 6 aerial victories, 1 ground victory, 1 damaged and 1 water kill, in which he and his wingman sank and burned the largest aircraft in world, the Blohm & Voss BV238-V1 on 18 September 1944. Hitler was going to use it to bomb Washington and New York City. The Water kill regarding the Blohm & Voss BV 238 has since been proven to be discredited.

=== October 7 mission ===
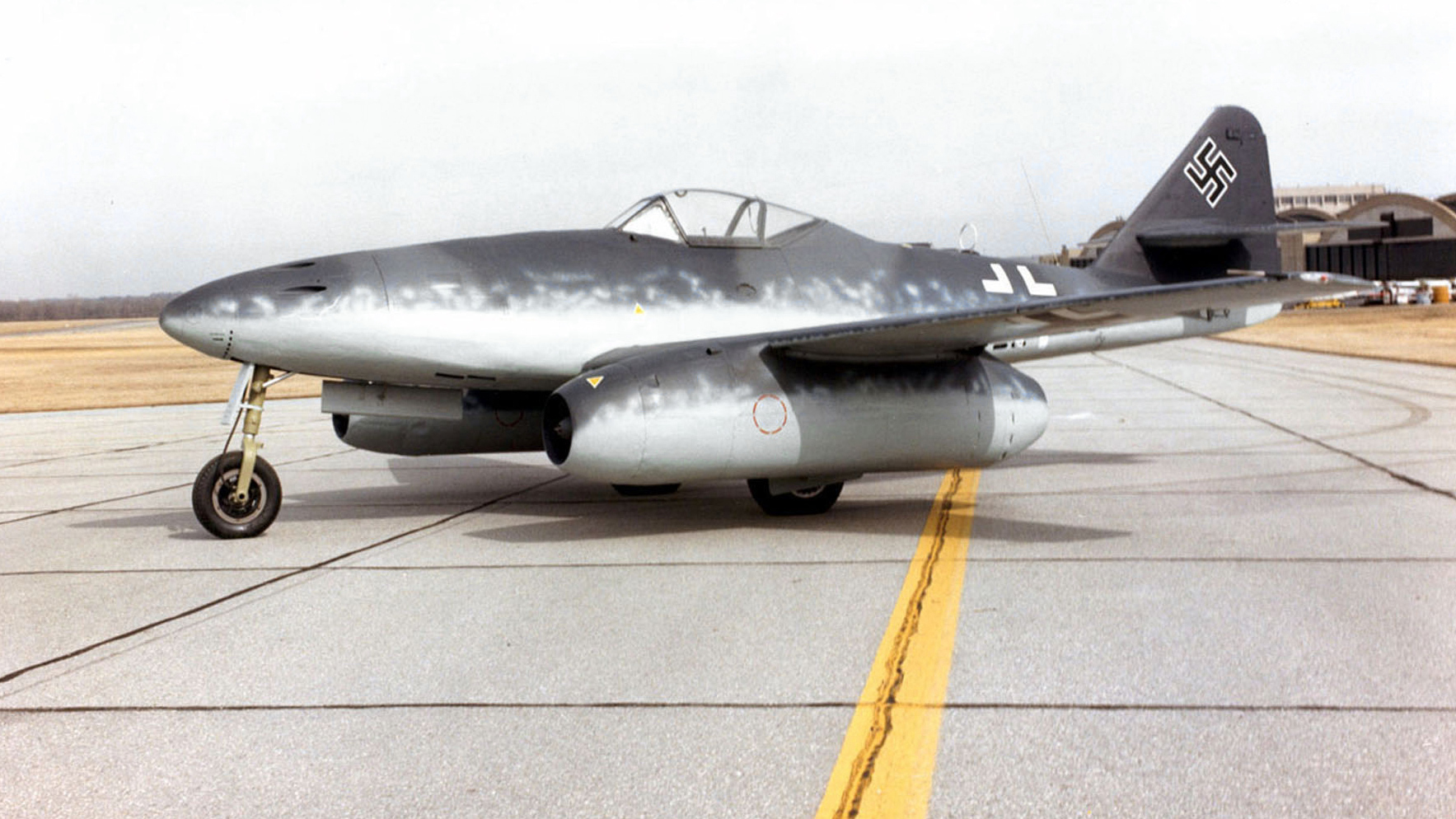
Messerschmitt Me 262

His biggest day was on October 7, 1944, when he shot down 2 jet-powered Me 262s on a single mission while leading an attack on Achmer Aerodrome.

His appeal for the Distinguished Service Cross was denied, because of the lack of evidence for his kills; the gun camera of his P-51 had jammed and his wingman, 2nd Lt. Robert McCandliss was shot down and became a prisoner of war. However, he was awarded the Air Force Cross many years later in 1983.

=== Post-mission ===
After his service in Europe, Drew was transferred to various training bases in the U.S. In 1945 he was assigned to the 413th Fighter Squadron of 414th Fighter Group, flying P-47 Thunderbolts at Iwo Jima in the Bonin Islands, where he flew B-29 Superfortress escorts over Japan and strafing missions on hangars, barracks, ammunition dumps, trains, marshalling yards and shipping.

After the war, Drew helped organize the 127th Fighter Group of Michigan Air National Guard. He became deputy group commander and later was appointed the first Air Adjutant General of the State of Michigan. He served this position till he left active duty in 1950.

=== Belated recognition ===
More than 40 years later, an Air Force clerk noticed Drew's claim for two Me 262 victories on the same mission. She contacted a custodian of German war records who knew former Luftwaffe pilots who might be able to shed light on the claim. Georg-Peter Eder had been set to lead the Me 262s of JG 7 that day, but when his aircraft had problems taking off the two-ill-fated pilots took off to lead JG 7. Eder says he saw a yellow-nosed P-51 dive on the Me 262s and shoot them down. Eder couldn't read "Detroit Miss" on the nose of the P-51 Mustang, but his account was sufficient to confirm Drew's two Me 262 victories.

After the total story was confirmed by both the German Luftwaffe archives and the United States Air Force archives, the Air Force Board for the Correction of Military Records recommended that Drew and his wife were flown in an Air Force C-141 Starlifter from Johannesburg, South Africa for the ceremony.

The Secretary of the Air Force, Verne Orr presented the Air Force Cross on May 12, 1983. He is one of the only three airmen to receive the Air Force Cross for actions in World War II.

== Aerial victory credits ==
Date	#	Type	Location	Aircraft flown	Unit Assigned
June 25, 1944	1	Messerschmitt Bf 109	Lisieux, France	P-51B	375 FS, 361 FG
August 25, 1944	1	Bf 109	Rostock, Germany	P-51B	375 FS, 361 FG
September 11, 1944	1	Bf 109	Göttingen, Germany	P-51D	375 FS, 361 FG
September 18, 1944	1	Heinkel He 111	Fehmarn Belt	P-51D	375 FS, 361 FG
October 7, 1944	2	Messerschmitt Me 262	Achmer, Germany	P-51D	375 FS, 361 FG

SOURCE: Air Force Historical Study 85: USAF Credits for the Destruction of Enemy Aircraft, World War II

== Awards and decorations ==
Drew's decorations include:

USAF Pilot Badge
Air Force Cross
Distinguished Flying Cross with 1 bronze oak leaf cluster	Air Medal with 2 silver and 2 bronze oak leaf clusters	Air Medal (second ribbon required for accouterment spacing)
American Campaign Medal	Asiatic-Pacific Campaign Medal	European-African-Middle Eastern Campaign Medal with 4 bronze campaign stars
World War II Victory Medal	National Defence Service Medal	Air Force Longevity Service Award

=== Air Force Cross citation ===

Drew, Urban L.
Major (then First Lieutenant), U.S Army Air Forces
375th Fighter Squadron, 361st Fighter Group, 8th Air Force
Date of Action: October 7, 1944

Citation:

The President of the United States of America, authorized by Title 10, Section 8742, United States Code, takes pleasure in presenting the Air Force Cross to Major (Air Corps) (then First Lieutenant) Urban L. "Ben" Drew, United States Army Air Forces, for extraordinary heroism in military operations against an armed enemy of the United States as Pilot of a P-51 Fighter Airplane and Leader of Blue Flight, 375th Fighter Squadron, 361st Fighter Group, EIGHTH Air Force in action near Hamm, Germany, on 7 October 1944. On that date, Lieutenant Drew became the first Allied pilot to shoot down in combat two Me 262 aircraft. Through his extraordinary heroism, superb airmanship, and aggressiveness in the face of the enemy, and in the dedication of his service to his country, Lieutenant Drew reflected the highest credit on himself and the United States Air Force.

== Later life ==
After his retirement from military life, Drew established an aviation business in United Kingdom and South Africa.

Drew died on April 3, 2013, at Vista, California and is buried at Arlington National Cemetery.

== See also ==
- Harrison B. Tordoff

== Works ==
- Powell, R.; Drew, Ben (2001). The Katzenjammer Ace. iUniverse. ISBN 978-0595206384.
