= 413th Regiment =

413th Regiment may refer to:

- 413th Regiment (United States)
- 413th Regiment of Unmanned Systems, Ukraine
- 413th (Fife) Coast Regiment, Royal Artillery

== See also ==
- 413th (disambiguation)
