= 413th =

413th may refer to:

- 413th Fighter-Interceptor Squadron, inactive United States Air Force unit
- 413th Flight Test Group, United States Air Force Air Force Reserve Command unit
- 413th Flight Test Squadron (413 FLTS), part of the 46th Test Wing, based at Hurlburt Field, Florida

== See also ==
- 413 (number)
- 413, the year 413 (CDXIII) of the Julian calendar
- 413 BC
