= 533d Air Defense Group =

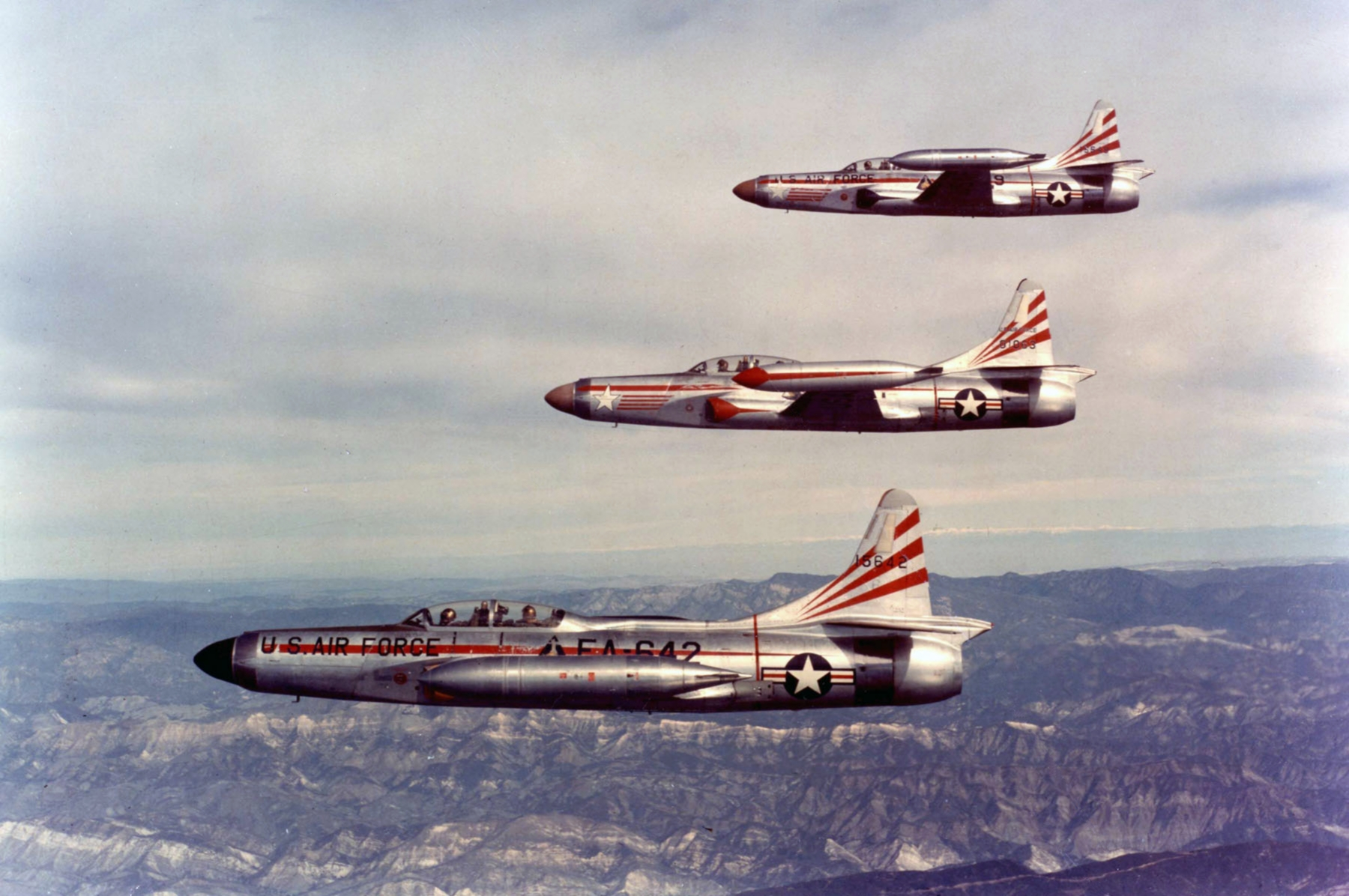
- F-94 Starfires of the group's 354th Fighter-Interceptor Squadron (Note: Aircraft are Lockheed F-94C-1-LO Starfires, serials 51-5642 (sent to the Military Aircraft Storage and Disposition Center (MASDC) on 13 November 1957, salvaged 4 June 1959), 50-1063 (transferred to the Minnesota Air National Guard, sent to MASDC on 23 April 1959, salvaged 4 June 1959), and 51-5549 (salvaged at Bunker Hill AFB in February 1959). Baugher, Joe (7 April 2023). "1950 USAF Serial Numbers". Joe Baugher.; Baugher, Joe (7 April 2023). "1951 USAF Serial Numbers". Joe Baugher.)
- Active: 1945; 1953–1955
- Country: United States
- Branch: United States Air Force
- Type: Fighter interceptor
- Role: Air defense

The 533d Air Defense Group is a disbanded United States Air Force organization. Its last assignment was with the 27th Air Division at Oxnard Air Force Base, California, where it was inactivated on 18 August 1955. The group was originally activated as the 533d Air Service Group, a support unit for the 483d Bombardment Group at the end of World War II in Italy.

The group was activated once again in 1953, when Air Defense Command (ADC) established it as the headquarters for a dispersed fighter-interceptor squadron and the medical, aircraft maintenance, and administrative squadrons supporting it. It was replaced in 1955 when ADC transferred its mission, equipment, and personnel to the 414th Fighter Group in a project that replaced air defense groups commanding fighter squadrons with fighter groups with distinguished records during World War II.

== History ==
=== World War II ===
The group was activated at Sterparone Airfield, Italy as the 533d Air Service Group shortly after VE Day in a reorganization of Army Air Forces (AAF) support groups in which the AAF replaced service groups that included personnel from other branches of the Army and supported two combat groups with air service groups including only Air Corps units. It was designed to support a single combat group. Its 959th Air Engineering Squadron provided maintenance that was beyond the capability of the combat group, its 783rd Air Materiel Squadron handled all supply matters, and its Headquarters & Base Services Squadron provided other support. The 533d supported the 483d Bombardment Group in Italy in 1945 until it was inactivated in the fall. The group was disbanded in 1948.

=== Cold War ===
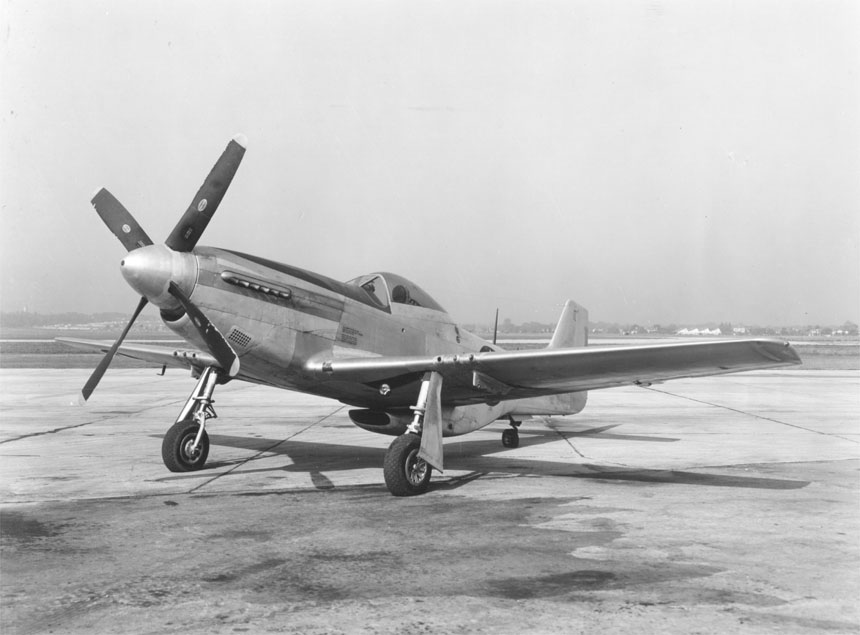
F-51D as flown by the 354th FIS until July 1953

The group was reconstituted, redesignated as the 533d Air Defense Group, and activated at Oxnard Air Force Base, California in 1953 with responsibility for air defense of Southern California. Assigned the 354th Fighter-Interceptor Squadron (FIS), which was already stationed at Oxnard, and flying World War II era North American F-51 Mustangs as its operational component. The 354th FIS had been assigned directly to the 27th Air Division. The 354th upgraded to Lockheed F-94 Starfires in July 1953. The group also replaced the 90th Air Base Squadron as USAF host organization at Oxnard. The group was assigned three squadrons to perform its support responsibilities.

The 533d was inactivated and replaced by the 414th Fighter Group (Air Defense) in 1955 as part of Air Defense Command's Project Arrow, which was designed to bring back on the active list the fighter units which had compiled memorable records in the two world wars. the group was disbanded once again in 1984.

== Lineage ==
- Activated as 533rd Air Service Group on 28 May 1945

Inactivated on 25 September 1945
Disbanded on 8 October 1948

- Reconstituted and redesignated as 533d Air Defense Group on 21 January 1953

Activated on 16 February 1953
Inactivated on 18 August 1955
Disbanded on 27 September 1984

=== Assignments ===
- Unknown, 28 May 1945 – 25 September 1945 (Note: Probably XV Air Force Service Command.)
- 27th Air Division, 16 February 1953 – 18 August 1955

=== Stations ===
- Sterperone Airfield, Italy, 28 May 1945 – May 1945
- Pisa, Italy, May 1945 – 25 September 1945
- Oxnard Air Force Base, California, 16 February 1953 – 18 August 1955

=== Components ===
Operational Squadron

- 354th Fighter-Interceptor Squadron, 16 February 1953 – 18 August 1955

Support Units

- 533rd Air Base Squadron, 16 February 1953 – 18 August 1955
- 533rd Materiel Squadron, 16 February 1953 – 18 August 1955
- 533rd Medical Squadron (later 533rd USAF Dispensary), 16 February 1953 – 18 August 1955
- 783rd Air Materiel Squadron, 28 May 1945 – 25 September 1945
- 959th Air Engineering Squadron, 28 May 1945 – 25 September 1945

=== Aircraft ===
- North American F-51D Mustang, 1953
- Lockheed F-94C Starfighter, 1953–1955

== See also ==
- Aerospace Defense Command Fighter Squadrons
- F-94 Starfire units of the United States Air Force
