= Saint-Valery =

- Commune
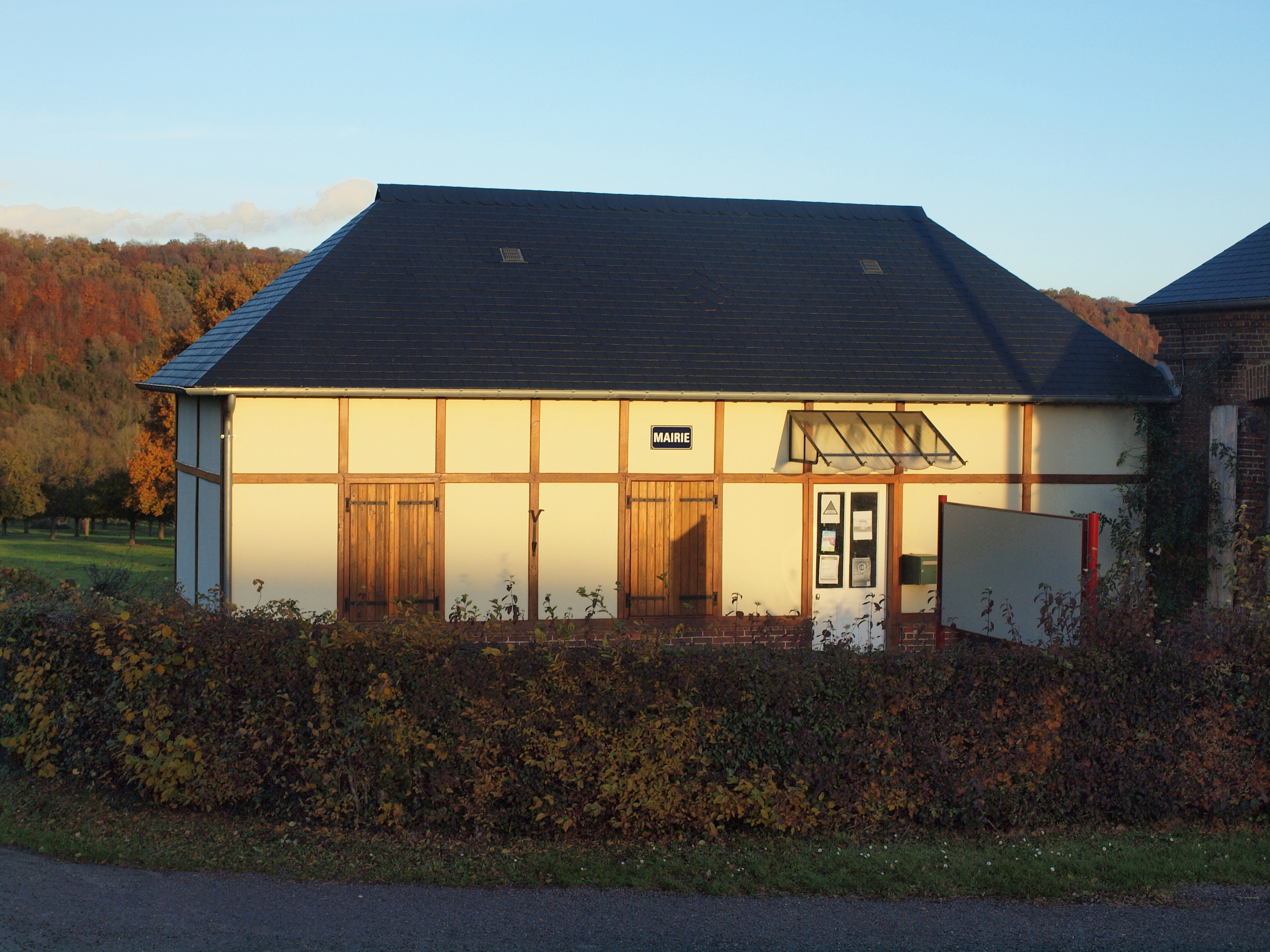
- The town hall in Saint-Valéry
- Location of Saint-Valery
- Location within France Location within Hauts-de-France
- Coordinates: 49°43′36″N 1°44′07″E
- Country: France
- Region: Hauts-de-France
- Department: Oise
- Arrondissement: Beauvais
- Canton: Grandvilliers
- Intercommunality: Picardie Verte

Government
  - Mayor (2020–2026): Olivier Genty
- Area^{1}: 4.52 km^{2} (1.75 sq mi)
- Elevation: 180 m (590 ft)
- Highest elevation: 219 m (719 ft)
- Lowest elevation: 135 m (443 ft)
- Population (2023): 53
  - Density: 12/km^{2} (30/sq mi)
- Time zone: UTC+01:00 (CET)
  - Summer (DST): UTC+02:00 (CEST)
- INSEE/Postal code: 60602 /60220
- ^{1} French Land Register data, which excludes lakes, ponds, glaciers > 1 km^{2} (0.386 sq mi or 247 acres) and river estuaries.

Saint-Valery (French pronunciation: [sɛ̃ valʁi]) is a commune in the Oise department in northern France.

== See also ==
- Communes of the Oise department
