= Oberdachstetten =

- Municipality
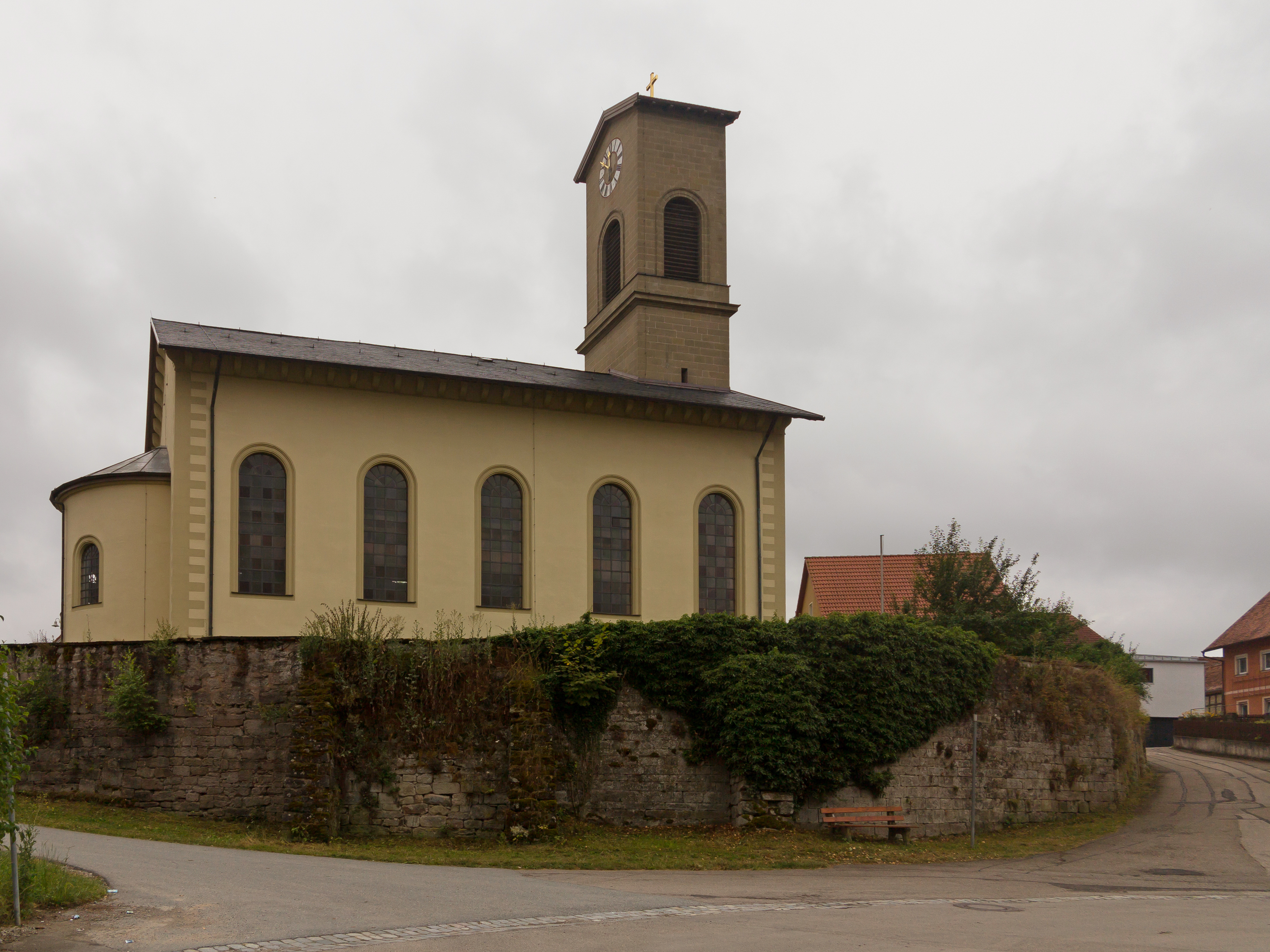
- Lutheran Church of Saint Bartholomew in Oberdachstetten

- Coat of arms

- Location of Oberdachstetten within Ansbach district
- Interactive map of Oberdachstetten
- Location within Germany Location within Bavaria
- Coordinates: 49°24.93′N 10°25.39′E
- Country: Germany
- State: Bavaria
- Admin. region: Mittelfranken
- District: Ansbach
- Subdivisions: 10 Ortsteile

Government
  - Mayor (2020–26): Martin Assum (CSU)

Area
  - Total: 23.66 km^{2} (9.14 sq mi)
- Elevation: 416–534 m (1,365–1,752 ft)

Population (2025-12-31)
  - Total: 1,598
  - Density: 67.54/km^{2} (174.9/sq mi)
- Time zone: UTC+01:00 (CET)
  - Summer (DST): UTC+02:00 (CEST)
- Postal codes: 91617
- Dialling codes: 09845, 09829 (Berglein, Dörflein, Mitteldachstetten)
- Vehicle registration: AN, DKB, FEU, ROT
- Website: www.oberdachstetten.de

Oberdachstetten (East Franconian: Dōchschdedn) is a municipality in the district of Ansbach in Bavaria in Germany.

== Gallery ==
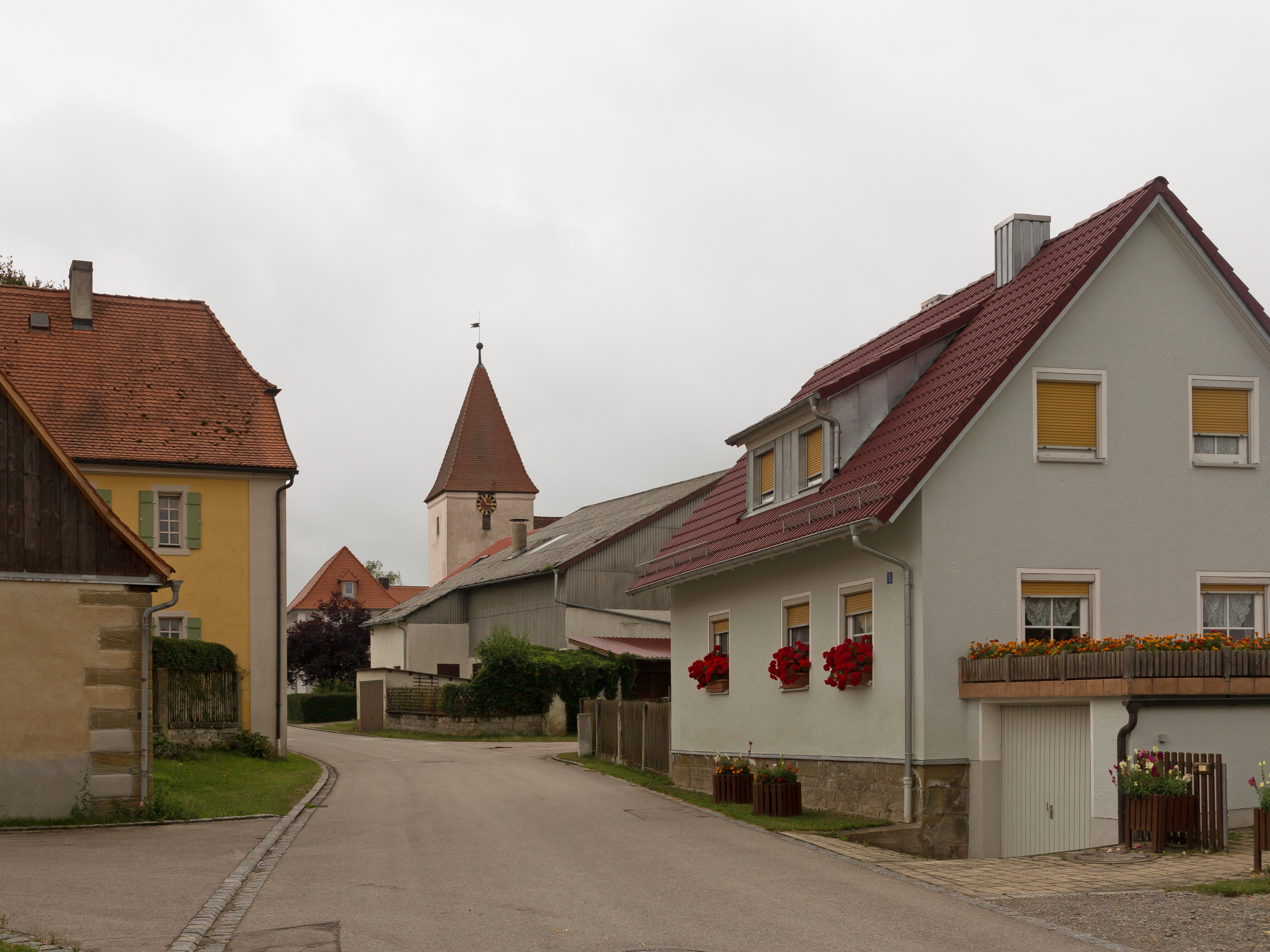
Mitteldachstetten, view to a street with churchtower

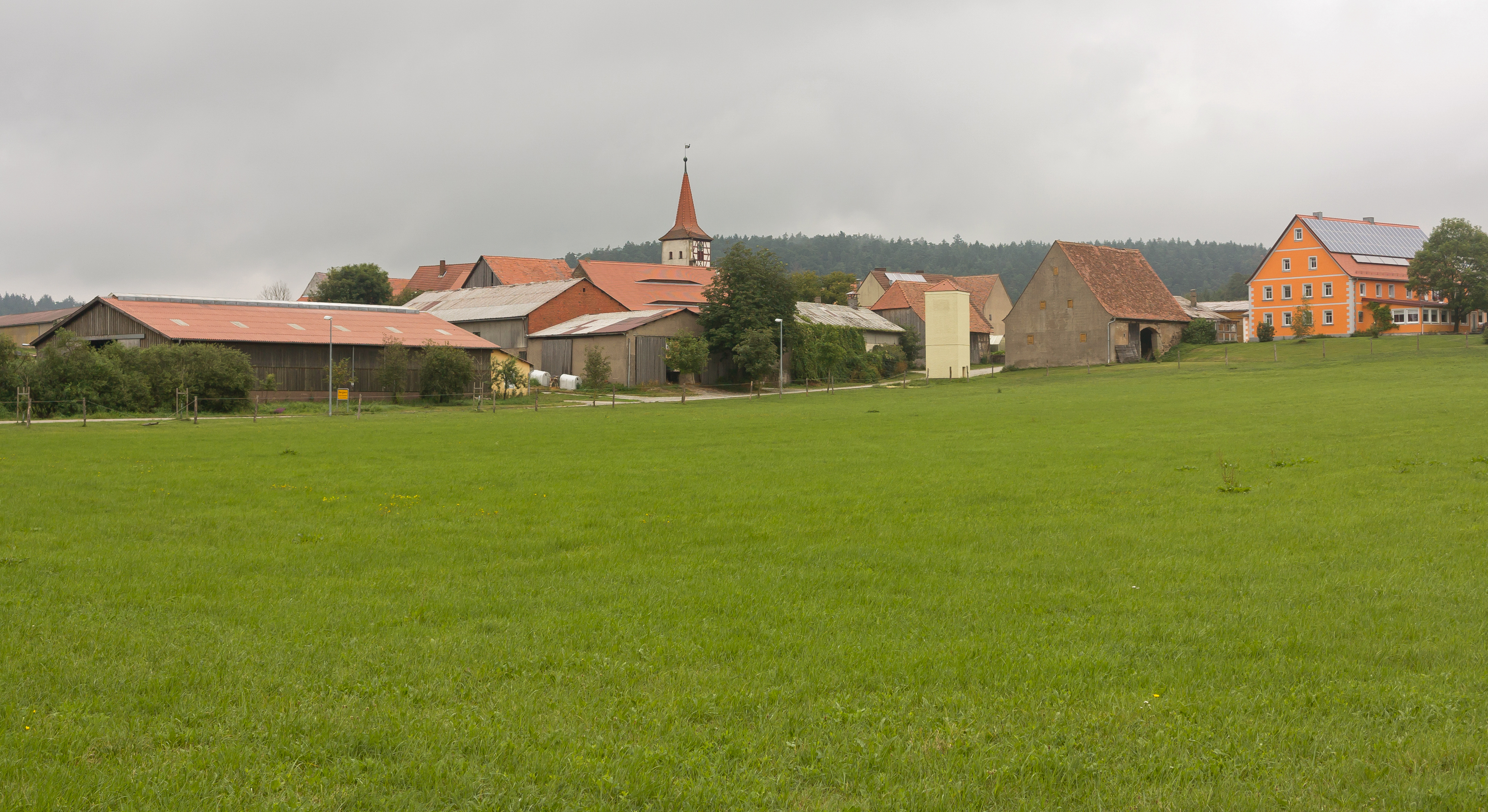
Berglein, view to the village

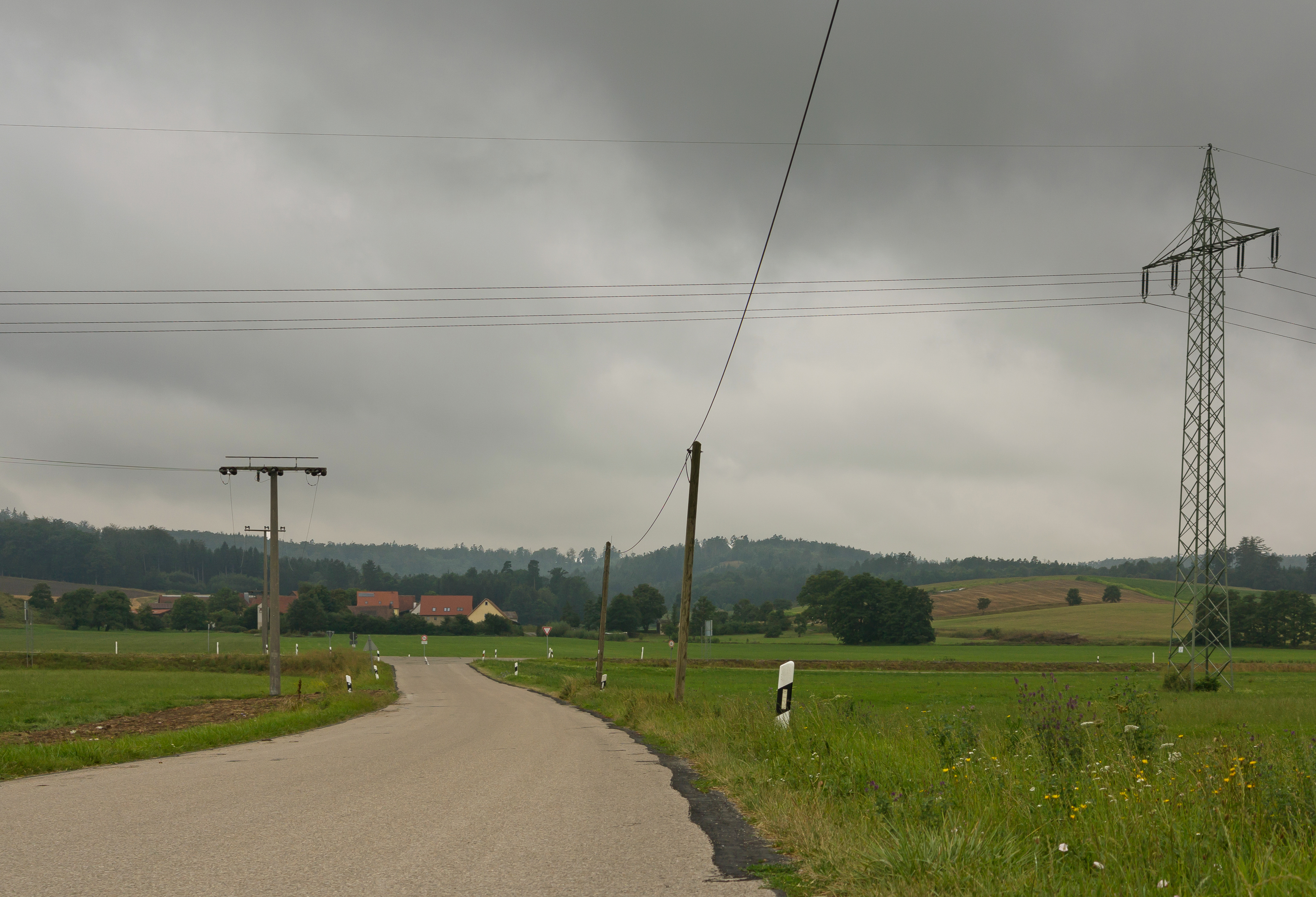
between Möckenau and Oberdachstetten, transmission towers in panorama

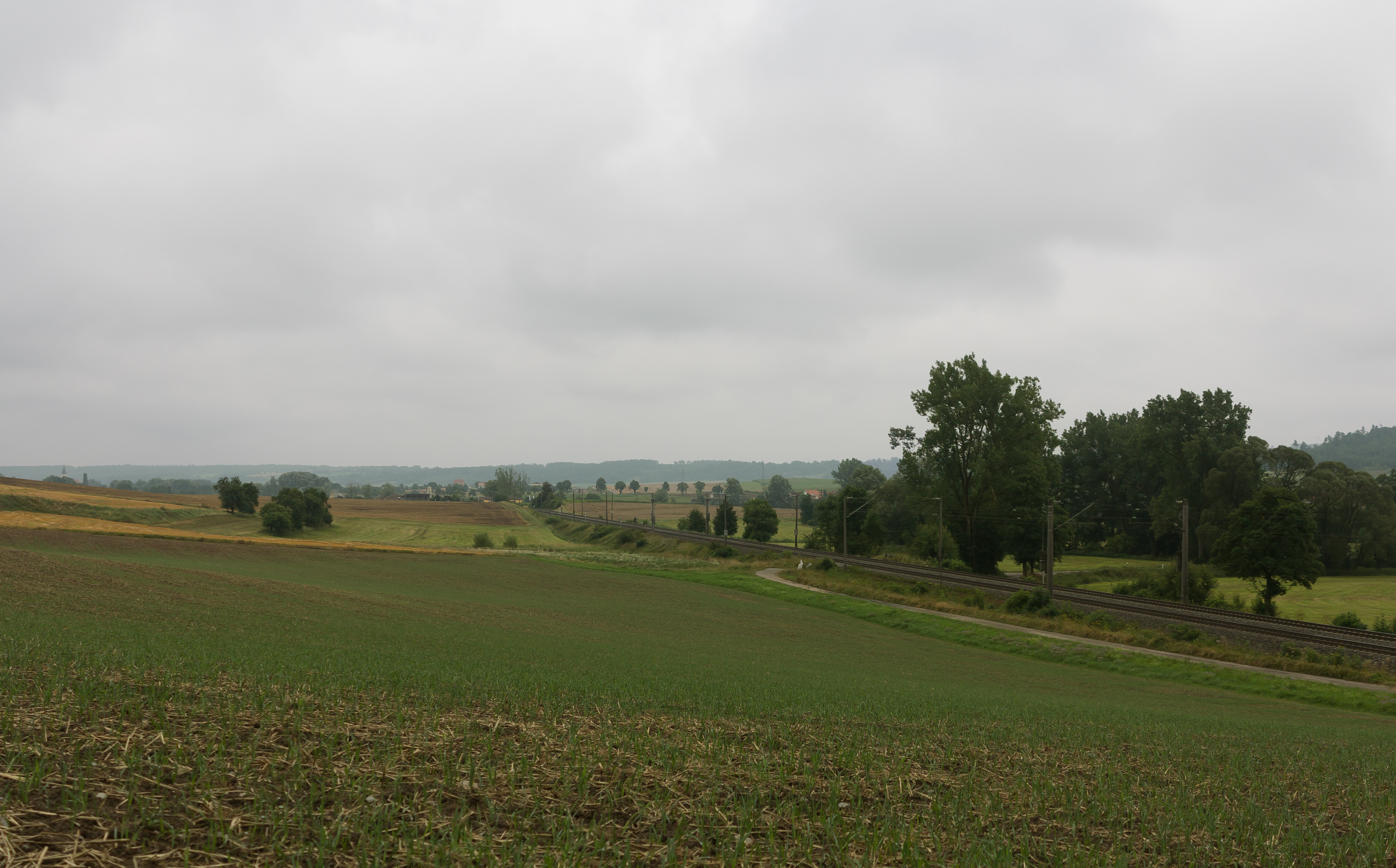
between Kellern and Lehrberg, railway in panorama
