= 414th Fighter Group =

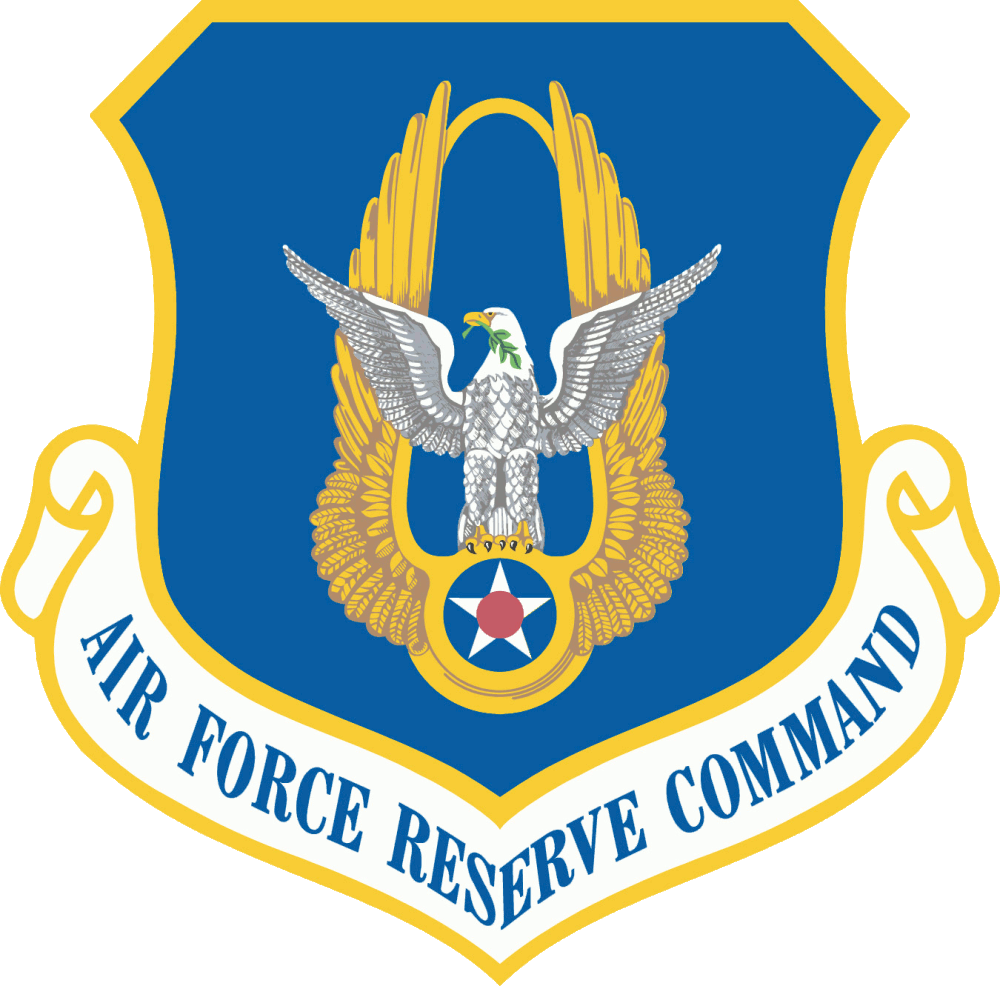
414th Fighter Group

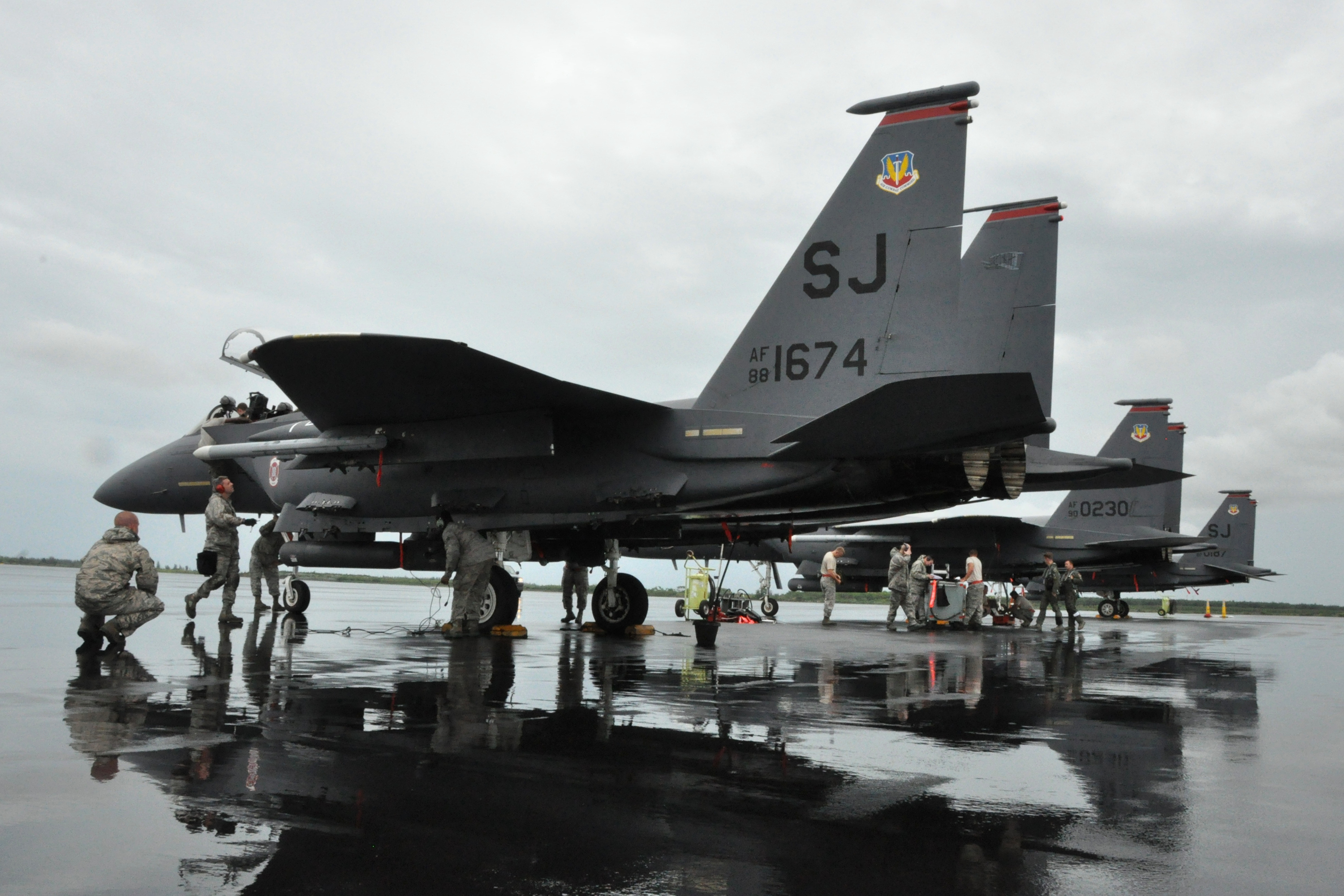
- 414th Fighter Group F-15E Strike Eagle (Note: Aircraft is McDonnell Douglas F-15E-45-MC Strike Eagle, serial 88-1674.)
- Active: 1944–1946; 1955–1969; 2010–present
- Country: United States
- Branch: United States Air Force
- Role: Fighter/Attack
- Size: 250 full and part time reservists
- Part of: Air Force Reserve Command
- Garrison/HQ: Seymour Johnson Air Force Base, North Carolina
- Engagements: Pacific Ocean theater of World War II
- Decorations: Air Force Outstanding Unit Award

Commanders
- Current commander: Colonel Timothy Foery

Insignia
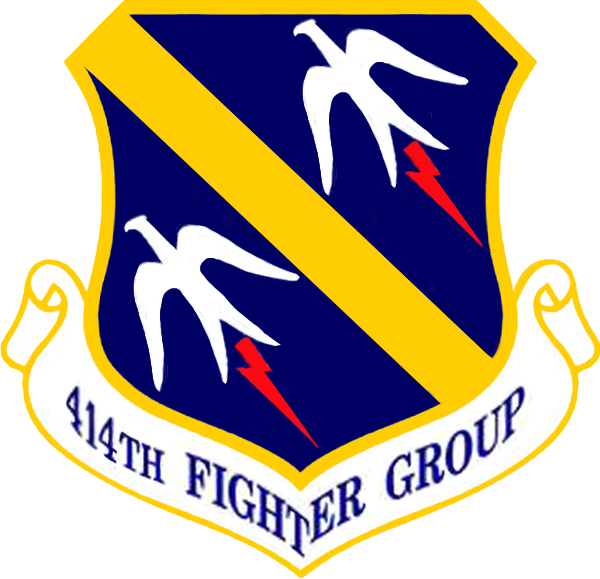
- 414th Fighter Group emblem (Note: Approved 28 July 1956. Description: Azure, a bend or, between two martlets volant azure, lightning bolts gules streaming from each of their tails.)

Aircraft flown
- Fighter: F-15E Strike Eagle

The 414th Fighter Group is an Air Reserve Component of the United States Air Force. It is assigned to the 944th Fighter Wing of Tenth Air Force, Air Force Reserve Command, stationed at Seymour Johnson Air Force Base, North Carolina.

The group was first activated in the fall of 1944 as a long-range fighter unit. It moved to the Pacific Ocean Theater, where it saw limited combat as an element of Twentieth Air Force. After the surrender of Japan, it moved to Clark Field in the Philippines, where it was part of Thirteenth Air Force until its planes were transferred to another group and it was inactivated in September 1946.

The 414th was activated again in the summer of 1955 at Oxnard Air Force Base, California as part of the air defenses of the Pacific coast. It was the United States Air Force host organization at Oxnard and provided logistical support to Air Defense Command radar stations nearby. It flew various interceptor aircraft at Oxnard through 1969 when it was inactivated in a reduction of manned interceptors as the United States faced a reduced threat from Soviet bombers.

The group was activated in its current role as an associate unit in 2010, flying and maintaining the same aircraft as the regular Air Force 4th Fighter Wing.

== Mission ==
The 414th Fighter Group was activated as an Air Force Reserve Command associate unit in July 2010. The group is an associate unit of the 4th Fighter Wing of Air Combat Command (ACC) and if mobilized the wing is gained by ACC. The role of the new group is to help Seymour Johnson Air Force Base produce more qualified McDonnell Douglas F-15E Strike Eagle aircrew and provide skilled maintainers to assist in the maintenance of the F-15E aircraft.

== History ==
=== World War II ===
The 414th Fighter Group as activated on 15 October 1944 at Seymour Johnson Field and equipped with Republic P-47 Thunderbolts. Most of the pilots had been flying Curtiss P-40 Warhawks at Harris Neck Army Air Field, Georgia. The group consisted of three squadrons, the 413th, 437th and 456th Fighter Squadrons.

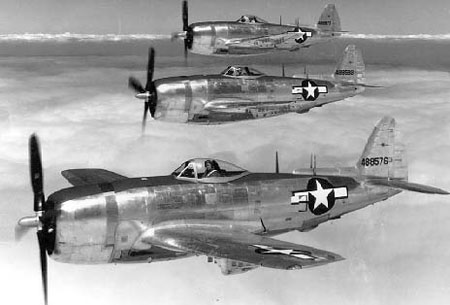
3-ship formation of Very Long Range P-47N Thunderbolts

In November 1944 the group relocated to Selfridge Field, Michigan where they transitioned into long-range P-47N Thunderbolts. On 19 March 1945, the Group moved to Bluethenthal Field, North Carolina in preparation for their departure to the Pacific war zone.

An advance echelon left in May 1945 and the remainder of the group left for the Pacific on converted aircraft carriers. The first element left from the Pacific Coast in June on USS Cape Esperance, with 49 planes for Iwo Jima, arriving on 7 July. USS Casablanca, with 60 planes departed on 7 July 1945 and arrived at Guam on 22 July 1945. On arrival in the Pacific, the 414th Group was assigned to the 301st Fighter Wing of VII Fighter Command, part of Twentieth Air Force. The air echelon that was based temporarily on Guam flew two missions from Harmon Field to Truk, one of the Caroline Islands, beginning on 13 July intending to attack Japanese planes, but found none. The group suffered its first combat loss on these missions.

The portion of the group on Iwo Jima began operations with an attack against a radar station on Chichi Jima with guns and rockets on 29 July. Operations during August were directed primarily against enemy airfields in Japan but the group also strafed hangars, barracks, ammunition dumps, trains, marshalling yards and shipping. A raid on Okazaki was diverted due to visibility and the secondary target, Nagoya Airfield, had no planes, so the group's fighters strafed buildings on the field.

Boeing B-29 Superfortress navigation "pathfinders" led the Thunderbolts to and from Japan. If the rendezvous with the pathfinder for the return journey was missed, it was a daunting prospect to find the way back to Iwo Jima 600 miles away. On return from one of the group's first operations supporting B-29s over Kyūshū on 8 August, the fuel supplies of several Thunderbolts were exhausted and pilots bailed out near Navy ships patrolling the route. Lt. Robert Dunnavant, of the 437th Fighter Squadron, spent 8 hours and 45 minutes in the air in his Thunderbolt. Rather than trying to land at North Field he landed at a small Navy airstrip on the island's coast because of his lack of fuel.

On 12 August 1945, the portion of the group at Guam attempted to join the rest of the unit on Iwo Jima, but severe weather forced them to divert to Tinian and Saipan. Two pilots, Roy Abbott, and George W. Caka, were lost on this flight due to the weather. On 16 August, they again departed from Guam, where they had re-gathered, and flew the 720 miles to Iwo. No attack missions to Japan were flown by the group after 14 August. In total, the group flew five missions to Japan from Iwo Jima.

The group's final mission was in a show of force on 30 August 1945, three days before V-J Day. Their fighters and B-29s flew over Tokyo as the instrument of surrender was being finalized by General Douglas MacArthur on USS Missouri.

The group was reassigned to Thirteenth Air Force at Clark Field in the Philippines in late December 1945. The Group flew a mix of P-47Ns, North American P-51 Mustangs, and then a few Lockheed P-80 Shooting Stars. Most of the group's aircraft were moved to Floridablanca Airfield in 1946, where they were used to equip the 18th Fighter Group. The 414th was inactivated at the end of September.

=== Air Defense Command ===
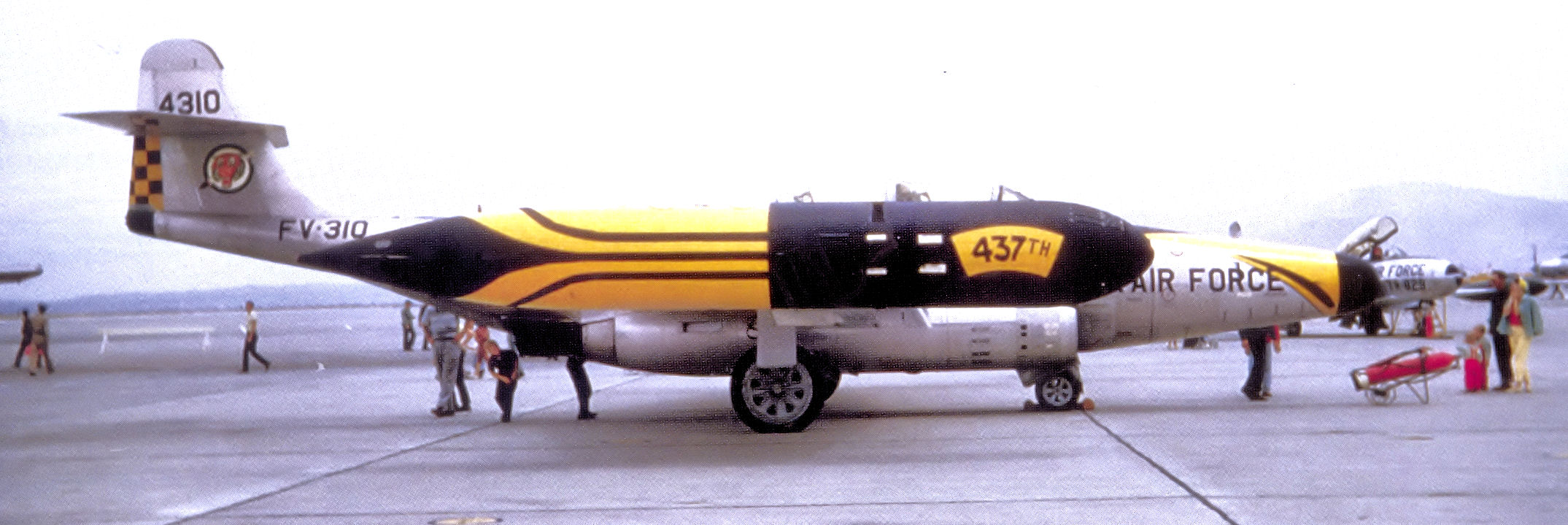
437th Fighter-Interceptor Squadron F-89 Scorpion in 1956 (Note: Aircraft is Northrop F-89H-1-NO Scorpion, serial 54–0310. This aircraft was destroyed after an aborted takeoff from Oxnard, resuting in the pilot's death. Dirkx, Marco (8 July 2024). "1954 USAF Serial Numbers". Joe Baugher’s Serial Number List.)

The 414th Fighter Group (Air Defense) was activated in 1955 at Oxnard Air Force Base, California as part of Project Arrow, which was designed to bring back on the active list the fighter units which had compiled memorable records in the two world wars. The group assumed the air defense mission, personnel, and equipment of the 533d Air Defense Group, which was simultaneously inactivated. Because Project Arrow was also designed to reunite World War II groups and their historic components, the 437th Fighter-Interceptor Squadron moved on paper from Otis Air Force Base, Massachusetts to Oxnard and took over the Lockheed F-94C Starfires of the 533d's 354th Fighter-Interceptor Squadron, which left Oxnard for McGhee-Tyson Airport, Tennessee.

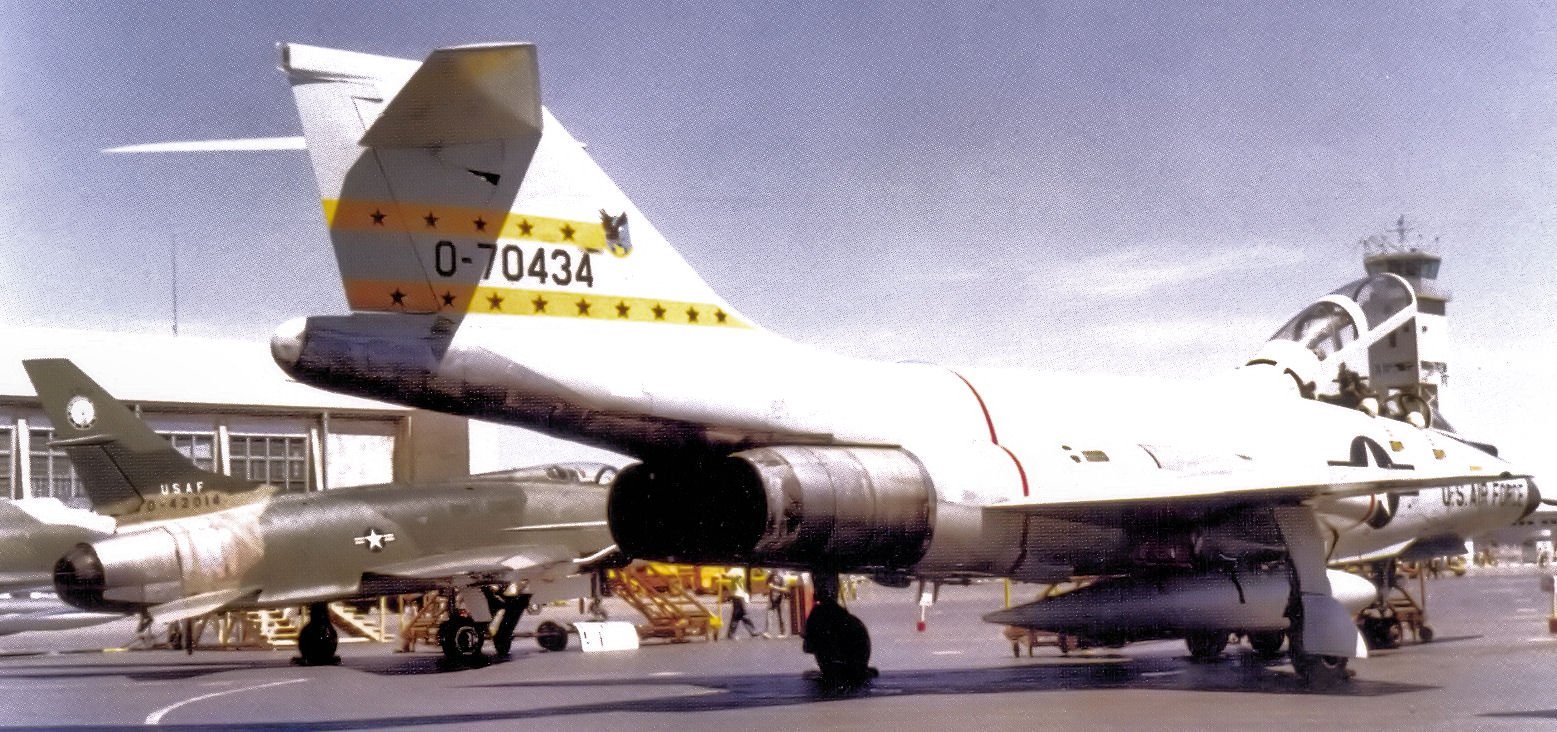
437th Fighter-Interceptor Squadron F-101B Voodoo in 1967 (Note: Aircraft is McDonnell F-101B-100-MC, serial 57-0434. This airplane was transferred to the Canadian Armed Forces in 1971. It crashed into the sea on 5 uly 1976 with the loss of both crewmembers. Dirkx, Marco (23 September 2025). "1957 USAF Serial Numbers". Joe Baugher’s Serial Number List.)

The 414th became the USAF host organization for Oxnard and was assigned several support organizations to carry out this mission. The 414th also provided logistical support for Air Defense Command Air Force Stations (radar sites) in the vicinity of Oxnard. The group mission was "to provide [the] southern California area with combat ready aircraft and crews to repel an enemy force attempting to strike against the United States."

By April 1956, the group traded in its F-94s for Northrop F-89D Scorpions. Like the F-94 it replaced, the F-89D was armed with Mighty Mouse rockets. Within a month, the squadron began to receive F-89H aircraft alongside its D models. The H model was capable of carrying AIM-4 Falcon guided missiles in addition to its unguided rockets. In the spring of 1958 the squadron converted to the most recent Scorpion, the F-89J, which was capable of carrying the nuclear capable AIR-2 Genie as its armament.

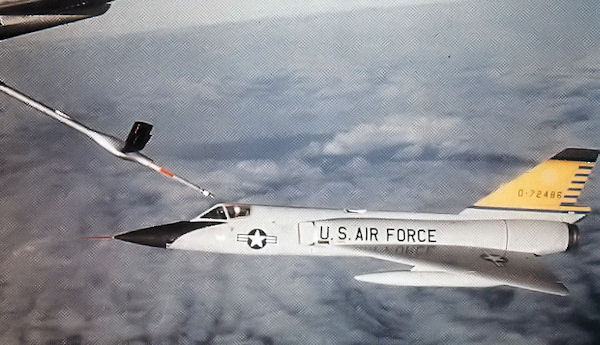
460th Fighter-Interceptor Squadron Convair F-106A refueling from a KC-135 September 1968 (Note: Aircraft is Convair F-106A-90-CO Delta Dart, serial 57-2486. Aircraft crashed 14 December 1972.)

In December 1957, the 66th Fighter-Interceptor Squadron moved from Alaska to Oxnard and was assigned to the group. However, the squadron was inactivated the following month without being assigned personnel or aircraft. In January 1960 the group began to receive its first supersonic "Century Series" fighter, the McDonnell F-101B Voodoo. It continued to fly the Voodoo until September 1968 when the 437th Squadron was inactivated and replaced by the 460th Fighter-Interceptor Squadron, which was equipped with the Convair F-106 Delta Dart. The F-106s for this conversion came from the inactivating 456th Fighter-Interceptor Squadron at Castle Air Force Base, California. The group operated this interceptor until the end of 1969 when it was inactivated as ADC reduced its manned interceptor force in view of the reduced threat to the United States from Soviet bomber aircraft. All its components were inactivated as well, except for the 460th, which moved to Kingsley Field, Oregon, where it replaced the 59th Fighter-Interceptor Squadron, a Convair F-102 Delta Dagger unit.

=== Air Force Reserve ===
The 414th was activated in 2010 as an associate fighter group with the 4th Fighter Wing of Air Combat Command, once again at Seymour Johnson Air Force Base, North Carolina, where it had first been activated in 1944. This time its mission was to train aircrew and assist in maintaining the F-15E. It was assigned the 307th Fighter Squadron and the 414th Maintenance Squadron to carry out this mission.

== Lineage ==
- Constituted as 414th Fighter Group, Single Engine on 5 October 1944

Activated on 15 October 1944
Inactivated on 30 September 1946

- Redesignated 414th Fighter Group (Air Defense) on 20 June 1955

Activated on 18 August 1955
Inactivated on 31 December 1969

- Redesignated 414th Tactical Fighter Group on 31 July 1985 (remained inactive)
- Redesignated 414th Fighter Group on 22 June 2010

Activated on 15 July 2010

=== Assignments ===
- First Air Force: 15 October 1944
- 301st Fighter Wing: 28 October 1944
- Twentieth Air Force: 5 August 1945
- Thirteenth Air Force: 23 December 1945
- XIII Fighter Command: 1 January 1946 – 30 September 1946
- 27th Air Division: 18 August 1955
- Los Angeles Air Defense Sector: 1 October 1959
- 27th Air Division: 1 April 1966
- Tenth Air Force: 19 November 1969 – 31 December 1969
- 482d Fighter Wing: 15 July 2010
- 944th Fighter Wing: 1 October 2012 – present

=== Subordinate Units ===
Operational Squadrons

- 66th Fighter-Interceptor Squadron, 1 December 1957 – 8 January 1958
- 307th Fighter Squadron, 14 July 2010 – present
- 413th Fighter Squadron. 15 October 1944 – 30 September 1946
- 437th Fighter Squadron (later 437th Fighter-Interceptor Squadron), 15 October 1944 – 30 September 1946; 18 August 1955 – 30 September 1968
- 456th Fighter Squadron, 15 October 1944 – 25 August 1946
- 460th Fighter-Interceptor Squadron, 30 September 1968 – 1 December 1969

Support Units

- 414th USAF Infirmary (later 414th USAF Dispensary), 18 August 1955 – 31 December 1969
- 414th Air Base Squadron (later 414th Combat Support Squadron), 18 August 1955 – 31 December 1969
- 414th Consolidated Aircraft Maintenance Squadron (later 414th Maintenance Squadron), 8 July 1957 – 31 December 1969; 15 July 2010 – present
- 414th Materiel Squadron, 18 August 1955 – 1 August 1964
- 414th Supply Squadron, 1 August 1964 – 31 December 1969

=== Stations ===
- Seymour Johnson Field, North Carolina, 15 October 1944
- Selfridge Field, Michigan, 15 November 1944
- Bluethenthal Field, North Carolina, 19 March – 11 May 1945
- North Field, Iwo Jima, Volcano Islands, 7 July 1945
- Clark Field, Luzon, Philippines 23 December 1945 – 30 September 1946
- Oxnard Air Force Base, California, 18 August 1955 – 31 December 1969
- Seymour Johnson Air Force Base, North Carolina, June 2010 – present

=== Aircraft ===
- Republic P-47D Thunderbolt, 1944–1945
- Republic P-47N Thunderbolt, 1945–1946
- North American P-51 Mustang, 1946
- Lockheed P-80 Shooting Star, 1946
- Lockheed F-94C Starfire, 1952–1956
- Northrop F-89D Scorpion, 1956–1958
- Northrop F-89H Scorpion, 1956–1958
- Northrop F-89J Scorpion, 1958–1960
- McDonnell F-101B Voodoo, 1960–1968
- McDonnell F-101F Voodoo, 1960–1968
- Convair F-106 Delta Dart, 1968–1969
- McDonnell Douglas F-15E Strike Eagle, 2010–present

=== Awards and campaigns ===
Award streamer	Award	Dates	Notes
	Air Force Outstanding Unit Award	1 July 1966-30 June 1968	414th Fighter Group (Air Defense)

Campaign Streamer	Campaign	Dates	Notes
	Air Offensive, Japan	7 July 1945 – 2 September 1945	414th Fighter Group, Single Engine
	Eastern Mandates	7 July 1945 – 2 September 1945	414th Fighter Group, Single Engine

== See also ==
- List of United States Air Force Aerospace Defense Command Interceptor Squadrons
