= 413 BC =

413 BC in various calendars
- Gregorian calendar: 413 BC; CDXIII BC
- Ab urbe condita: 341
- Ancient Egypt era: XXVII dynasty, 113
- Pharaoh: Darius II of Persia, 11
- Ancient Greek Olympiad (summer): 91st Olympiad, year 4
- Assyrian calendar: 4338
- Balinese saka calendar: N/A
- Bengali calendar: −1006 – −1005
- Berber calendar: 538
- Buddhist calendar: 132
- Burmese calendar: −1050
- Byzantine calendar: 5096–5097
- Chinese calendar: 丁卯年 (Fire Rabbit); 2285 or 2078 — to — 戊辰年 (Earth Dragon); 2286 or 2079
- Coptic calendar: −696 – −695
- Discordian calendar: 754
- Ethiopian calendar: −420 – −419
- Hebrew calendar: 3348–3349
- Hindu calendars
- Vikram Samvat: −356 – −355
- Shaka Samvat: N/A
- Kali Yuga: 2688–2689
- Holocene calendar: 9588
- Iranian calendar: 1034 BP – 1033 BP
- Islamic calendar: 1066 BH – 1065 BH
- Javanese calendar: N/A
- Julian calendar: N/A
- Korean calendar: 1921
- Minguo calendar: 2324 before ROC 民前2324年
- Nanakshahi calendar: −1880
- Thai solar calendar: 130–131
- Tibetan calendar: མེ་མོ་ཡོས་ལོ་ (female Fire-Hare) −286 or −667 or −1439 — to — ས་ཕོ་འབྲུག་ལོ་ (male Earth-Dragon) −285 or −666 or −1438

Year 413 BC was a year of the pre-Julian Roman calendar. At the time, it was known as the Year of the Consulship of Cossus and Medullinus (or, less frequently, year 341 Ab urbe condita). The denomination 413 BC for this year has been used since the early medieval period, when the Anno Domini calendar era became the prevalent method in Europe for naming years.

== Events ==
=== By place ===
==== Greece ====
- After suffering a defeat in which the Athenian commander Lamachus is killed, Demosthenes suggests that they immediately give up the siege of Syracuse and return to Athens, where they are needed to defend against a Spartan invasion of Attica. Nicias refuses, but the Syracusans and Spartans under Hermocrates are able to trap the Athenians in the harbour and the Athenians sustain heavy losses in the Battle of Syracuse. Demosthenes is ambushed by the Syracusans and is forced to surrender. Nicias is soon captured as well, and both are executed, with most of the surviving Athenian soldiers sent to work in the Sicilian quarries. Ten proboulos (including Sophocles) are elected to help run Athens.
- Tissaphernes, the Persian satrap of Lydia and Caria, forms an alliance with Sparta. The Spartans, with strategic advice from Alcibiades and limited assistance from the Persians under Pharnabazus, advance almost to the gates of Athens. King Agis II leads the Spartan force that occupies Decelea in Attica.
- Archelaus I becomes King of Macedonia following the death of his father, King Perdiccas II. Archelaus seizes the throne after murdering his uncle, his cousin, and his half brother, the legitimate heir.

=== By topic ===
==== Drama ====
- Euripides' play Electra is performed.

== Deaths ==
- Demosthenes, Athenian general
- Nicias, Athenian soldier and statesman (b. 470 BC)
- Perdiccas II, Macedonian king
