= 413th Fighter-Interceptor Squadron =

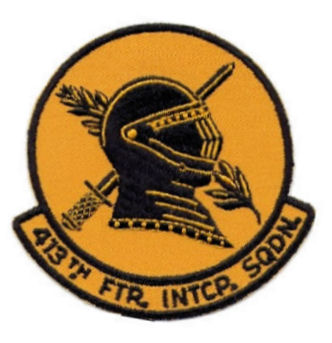
- Emblem of the 413th Fighter-Interceptor Squadron
- Active: 1944–1955
- Country: United States
- Branch: United States Air Force
- Type: Fighter-Interceptor

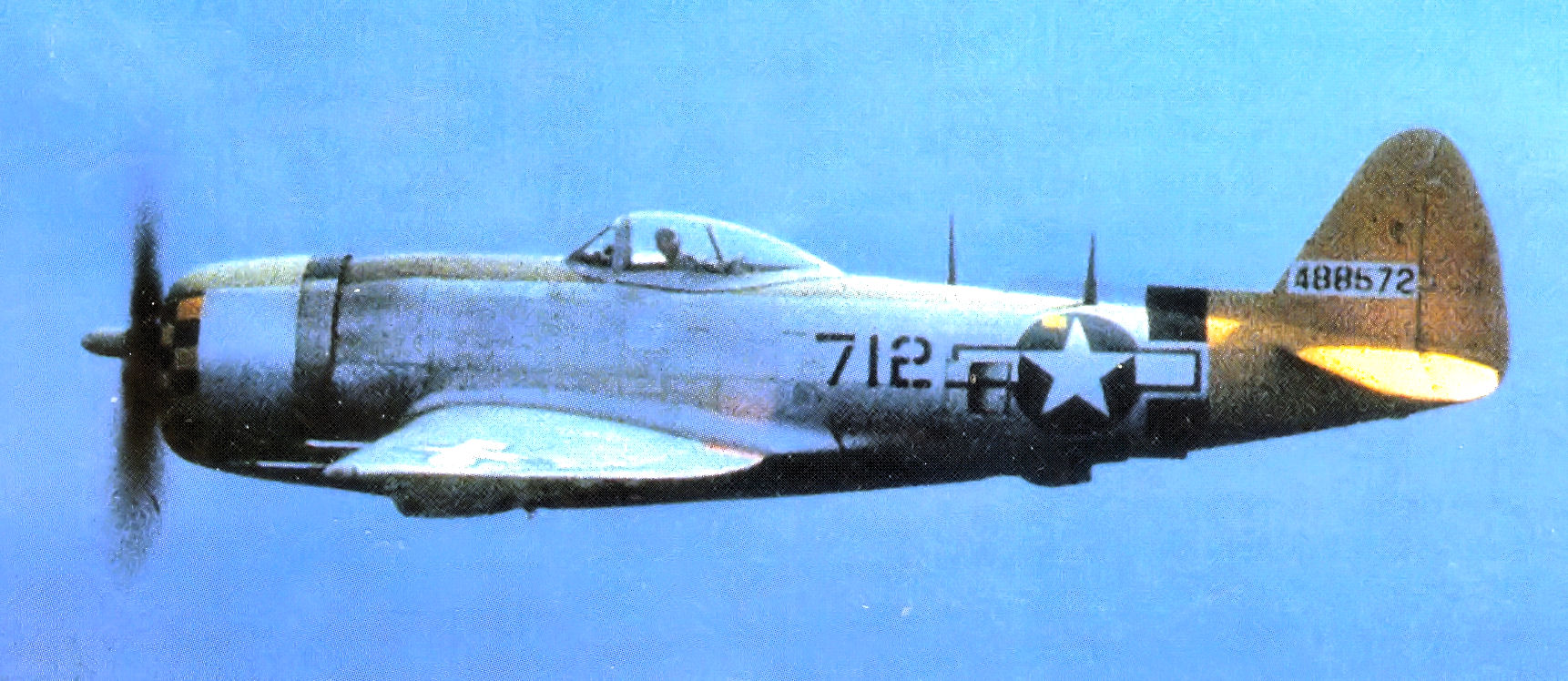
413th Fighter Squadron Republic P-47N-5-RE Thunderbolt 44-88572, 1945 flying over the Philippines

The 413th Fighter-Interceptor Squadron is an inactive United States Air Force unit. Its last assignment was with the 28th Air Division, stationed at Travis AFB, California. It was inactivated on 18 August 1955.

== History ==
Combat in Western Pacific, 13 July – 14 August 1945. Air Defense of central West Coast; 1954–1955.

== Lineage ==
- Constituted 413th Fighter Squadron on 5 October 1944

Activated on 15 October 1944
Inactivated on 30 September 1946

- Redesignated 413th Fighter-Interceptor Squadron on 23 March 1953

Activated on 8 July 1954
Inactivated on 18 August 1955.

=== Assignments ===
- 414th Fighter Group, 15 October 1944 – 30 September 1946
- 28th Air Division, 8 July 1954 – 18 August 1955.

=== Stations ===
- Seymour Johnson Field, North Carolina, 15 October 1944
- Selfridge Field, Michigan, 20 November 1944
- Bluethenthal Field, North Carolina, 19 March – 5 June 1945
- North Field, Iwo Jima, 7 July 1945
- Clark Field, Luzon, 23 December 1945
- Floridablanca Airfield, Luzon, unknown-30 September 1946
- Travis AFB, California, 8 July 1954 – 18 August 1955.

=== Aircraft ===
- P-47 Thunderbolt, 1944–1946
- F-86D Sabre Interceptor, 1954–1955
