= Messerschmitt Me 262 =

First operational jet-powered fighter aircraft

Me 262 Schwalbe
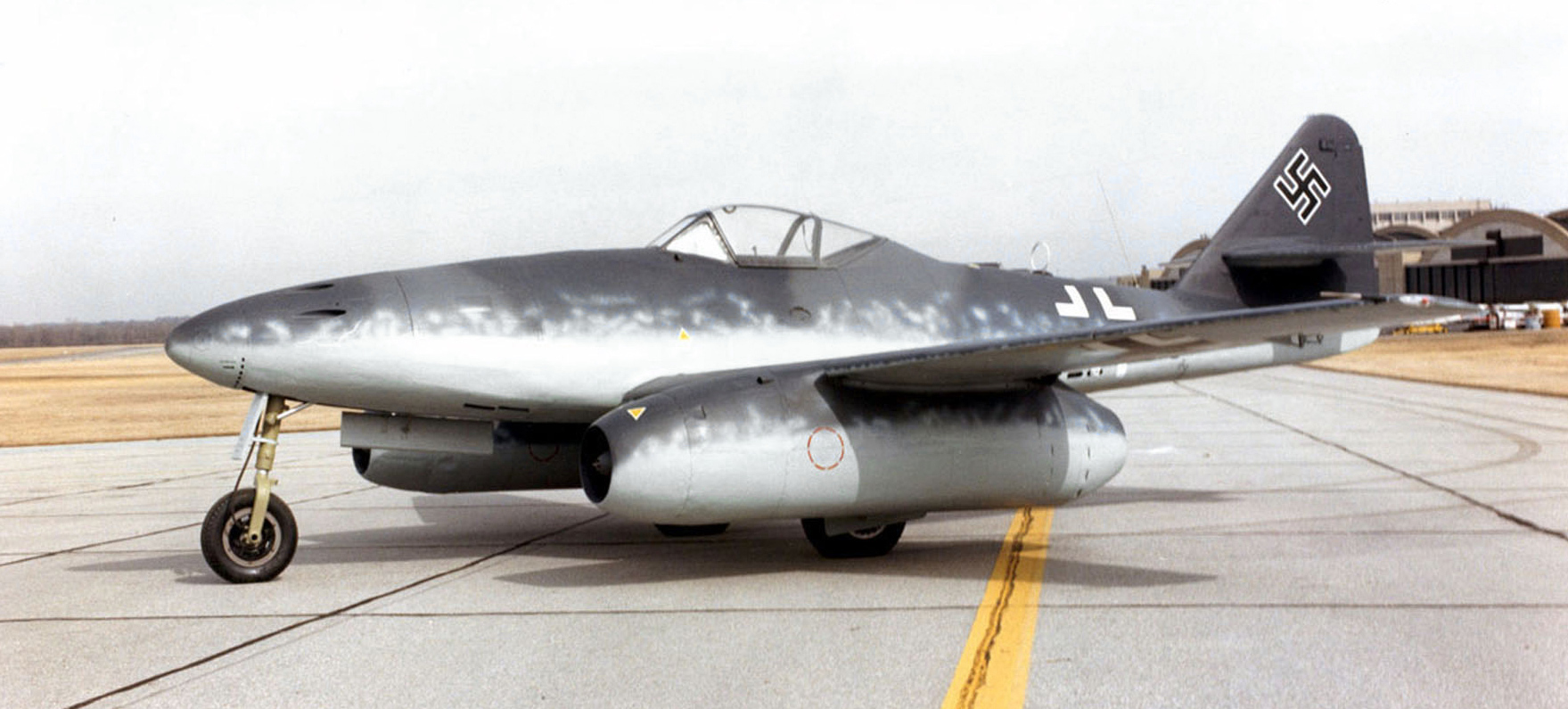
- Messerschmitt Me 262 A-1a late production model

General information
- Type: Fighter aircraft and fighter-bomber
- Manufacturer: Messerschmitt
- Primary users: Luftwaffe Czechoslovak Air Force (S-92)
- Number built: 1,430

History
- Introduction date: April 1944
- First flight: 18 April 1941 with piston engine (Junkers Jumo 210); 18 July 1942 with jet engines (Junkers Jumo 004)
- Retired: 1945, Germany; 1951, Czechoslovakia
- Developed into: Messerschmitt P.1099

The Messerschmitt Me 262, nicknamed Schwalbe (German for "Swallow") in fighter versions, or Sturmvogel ("Storm Bird") in fighter-bomber versions, is a fighter aircraft and fighter-bomber that was designed and produced by the German aircraft manufacturer Messerschmitt. It was the world's first operational jet-powered fighter aircraft and one of two jet fighter aircraft types to see air-to-air combat in World War II, the other being the Heinkel He 162.

The design of what would become the Me 262 started in April 1939, before World War II. It made its maiden flight on 18 April 1941 with a piston engine, and its first jet-powered flight on 18 July 1942. Progress was delayed by problems with engines, metallurgy, and interference from Luftwaffe chief Hermann Göring and Adolf Hitler. The German leader demanded that the Me 262, conceived as a defensive interceptor, be redesigned as ground-attack/bomber aircraft. The aircraft became operational with the Luftwaffe in mid-1944. The Me 262 was faster and more heavily armed than any Allied fighter, including the British jet-powered Gloster Meteor. The Allies countered by attacking the aircraft on the ground and during takeoff and landing.

One of the most advanced World War II combat aircraft, the Me 262 operated as a light bomber, reconnaissance aircraft, and experimental night fighter. The Me 262 proved an effective dogfighter against Allied fighters; German pilots claimed 542 Allied aircraft were shot down, although higher claims have sometimes been made. (Note: Morgan and Weal estimate that jet fighters of all types produced 745 victories.) The aircraft had reliability problems because of strategic materials shortages and design compromises with its Junkers Jumo 004 axial-flow turbojet engines. Late-war Allied attacks on fuel supplies also reduced the aircraft's readiness for combat and training sorties. Armament production within Germany was focused on more easily manufactured aircraft. Ultimately, the Me 262 had little effect on the war because of its late introduction and the small numbers that entered service.

Although German use of the Me 262 ended with World War II, the Czechoslovak Air Force operated a small number until 1951. Also, Israel may have used between two and eight Me 262s. These were supposedly built by Avia and supplied covertly, and there has been no official confirmation of their use. (Note: "According to Egyptian and British intelligence, a jet fighter of unknown type exploded in flight inside Israeli airspace during April 1950. The British thought that it might be a de Havilland Vampire of unknown origin, while the Egyptians stated that they had information revealing that the IAF had secretly taken delivery of eight crated Avia S.92 jets. The S.92 was the Messerschmitt Me 262A-1A built in Czechoslovakia during the initial years of the postwar era.) The aircraft heavily influenced several prototype designs, such as the Sukhoi Su-9 (1946) and Nakajima Kikka. Many captured Me 262s were studied and flight-tested by the major powers, and influenced the designs of production aircraft such as the North American F-86 Sabre, MiG-15, and Boeing B-47 Stratojet. Several aircraft have survived on static display in museums. Some privately built flying reproductions have also been produced; these are usually powered by modern General Electric CJ610 engines.

== Design and development ==
=== Origins ===
Before World War II, the Germans saw the potential for aircraft powered by the jet engine constructed by Hans von Ohain in 1936. After the successful test flights of the world's first jet aircraft—the Heinkel He 178—within a week of the invasion of Poland which started the conflict, they adopted the jet engine for an advanced fighter aircraft. As a result, the Me 262 was already under development as Projekt 1065 (or P.1065) before the start of the war. The project had originated with a request by the Reichsluftfahrtministerium (RLM, Ministry of Aviation) for a jet aircraft capable of one hour's endurance and a speed of at least 850 km/h (530 mph; 460 kn). Woldemar Voigt headed the design team, with Messerschmitt's chief of development, Robert Lusser, overseeing.

During April 1939, initial plans were drawn up; these were very different from the aircraft that eventually entered service. Specifically, it had wing-root-mounted engines, rather than podded ones. The progression of the original design was delayed greatly by technical problems with the new jet engine. Originally designed with straight wings, problems arose when the long delayed engines proved heavier than originally promised. While waiting for the engines, Messerschmitt moved the engines from the wing roots to underwing pods, allowing them to be changed more readily if needed. That turned out to be important, both for availability and maintenance.

When it became apparent that the BMW 003 jets would be significantly heavier than anticipated, on 1 March 1940, it was decided that instead of moving the wing backward on its mount, the outer wing would be swept slightly rearwards to 18.5 degrees, to accommodate the change in the centre of gravity and to position the centre of lift properly relative to the centre of mass. (The original 35° sweep, proposed by Adolf Busemann, was not adopted.)

Initially the inboard leading edge retained the straight profile as did the trailing edge of the midsection of the wing.

Based on data from the AVA Göttingen and wind tunnel results, the inboard section's leading edge (between the nacelle and wing root) was later swept to the same angle as the outer panels, from the "V6" sixth prototype onward throughout volume production.

The shallow leading edge sweep of 18.5° may have inadvertently provided an advantage by slightly increasing the critical Mach number however, its Tactical (usable) Mach number remained a relatively modest at Mach 0.82 and both German and British test pilots found that it suffered severe controllability problems as it approached Mach 0.86.

The jet engine program was impeded by a lack of funding, which was primarily due to the prevailing attitude amongst high-ranking officials that the conflict could be won easily with conventionally powered aircraft. Among these was Hermann Göring, head of the Luftwaffe, who cut the engine development program to just 35 engineers in February 1940 (the month before the first wooden mock-up was completed). The aeronautical engineer Willy Messerschmitt sought to maintain mass production of the piston-powered, 1935-origin Bf 109 and the projected Me 209. Major General Adolf Galland had supported Messerschmitt through the early development years, flying the Me 262 himself on 22 April 1943. By that time, the problems with engine development had slowed production of the aircraft considerably. One particularly acute problem was the lack of an alloy with a melting point high enough to endure the temperatures involved, a problem that had not been adequately resolved by the end of the war. After a November 1941 flight (with BMW 003s) ended in a double flameout, the aircraft made its first successful flight entirely on jet power on 18 July 1942, propelled by a pair of Jumo 004 engines.

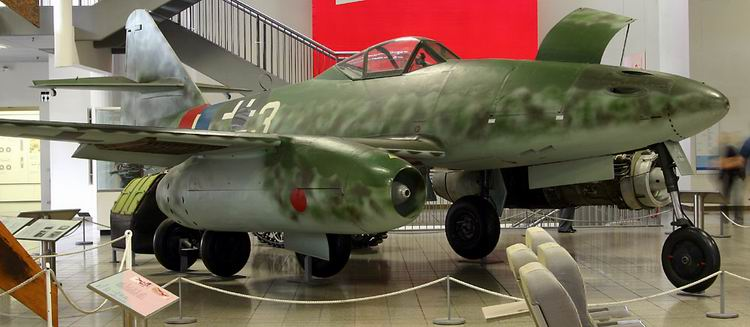
Hans Guido Mutke's Me 262 A-1a/R7 on display at the Deutsches Museum in Munich

Ludwig Bölkow was the principal aerodynamicist assigned to work on the design of the Me 262. He initially designed the wing using NACA airfoils modified with an elliptical nose section. Later in the design process, these were changed to AVL derivatives of NACA airfoils, the NACA 00011-0.825-35 being used at the root and the NACA 00009-1.1-40 at the tip. The elliptical nose derivatives of the NACA airfoils were used on the horizontal and vertical tail surfaces. Wings were of single-spar cantilever construction, with stressed skins, varying from 3 mm (0.12 in) skin thickness at the root to 1 mm (0.039 in) at the tip. To expedite construction, save weight, and use fewer strategic materials late in the war, the wing interiors were not painted. The wings were fastened to the fuselage at four points, using a pair of 20 mm (0.79 in) and forty-two 8 mm (0.31 in) bolts.

During mid-1943, Adolf Hitler envisioned the Me 262 as a ground-attack/bomber aircraft rather than a defensive interceptor. The configuration of a high-speed, light-payload Schnellbomber ("fast bomber") was intended to penetrate enemy airspace during the expected Allied invasion of France. His edict resulted in the development of (and concentration on) the Sturmvogel variant. Hitler's interference helped to extend the delay in bringing the Schwalbe into operation; (other factors contributed too; in particular, there were engine vibration problems which needed attention). In his memoirs, Albert Speer, then Minister of Armaments and War Production, claimed Hitler originally had blocked mass production of the Me 262, before agreeing in early 1944. Similar criticisms were voiced by Lieutenant General Adolf Galland. Hitler rejected arguments that the aircraft would be more effective as a fighter against the Allied bombers destroying large parts of Germany and wanted it as a bomber for revenge attacks. According to Speer, Hitler felt its superior speed compared to other fighters of the era meant it could not be attacked, and so preferred it for high altitude straight flying. Claims that Hitler's edict delayed operational deployment of the aircraft for several months, are, however incorrect. In fact, his decree delayed the operational introduction of the Me 262 in the first fighter unit, Kommando Nowotny, by less than three weeks. The most significant factor was the short running life of the Jumo 004 turbojet; even in spring 1945 the Jumo 004 was still not fully reliable.

=== Test flights ===
Test flights began on 18 April 1941, at Augsburg, piloted by Fritz Wendel with the Me 262 V1 example, bearing its Stammkennzeichen radio code letters of PC+UA. But since its intended BMW 003 turbojets were not ready for fitting, a conventional Junkers Jumo 210 engine was mounted in the V1 prototype's nose, driving a propeller, to test the Me 262 V1 airframe. When the BMW 003 engines were installed, the Jumo was retained for safety, which proved wise as both 003s failed during the first flight and the pilot had to land using the nose-mounted engine alone. The V1 through V4 prototype airframes all possessed what would become an uncharacteristic feature for most later jet aircraft designs, a fully retracting conventional gear setup with a retracting tailwheel—indeed, the very first prospective German "jet fighter" airframe design ever flown, the Heinkel He 280, used a retractable tricycle landing gear from its beginnings and flew on jet power alone as early as the end of March 1941.

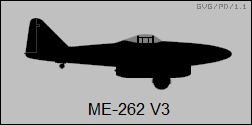
Silhouette of the V3 prototype – V1 through V4 similar. Note retracting conventional tail wheel gear

The V3 third prototype airframe, with the code PC+UC, became a true jet when it flew on 18 July 1942 in Leipheim near Günzburg, Germany, piloted by test pilot Fritz Wendel. This was almost nine months ahead of the British Gloster Meteor's first flight on 5 March 1943. Its retracting conventional tail wheel gear (similar to other contemporary piston-powered propeller aircraft), a feature shared with the first four Me 262 V-series airframes, caused its jet exhaust to deflect off the runway, with the wing's turbulence negating the effects of the elevators, and the first takeoff attempt was cut short.

On the second attempt, Wendel solved the problem by tapping the aircraft's brakes at takeoff speed, lifting the horizontal tail out of the wing's turbulence. The first four prototypes (V1-V4) were built with the conventional gear configuration. Changing to a tricycle arrangement—a permanently fixed undercarriage on the fifth prototype (V5, code PC+UE), with the definitive fully retractable nosewheel gear on the V6 (with Stammkennzeichen code VI+AA, from a new code block) and subsequent aircraft corrected this problem. (Note: The nosewheel was a 66 cm × 16 cm (26.0 in × 6.3 in) item identical to the Bf 109F's main gear wheel, fitted with a Buna rubber tire and pneumatic drum brake.)

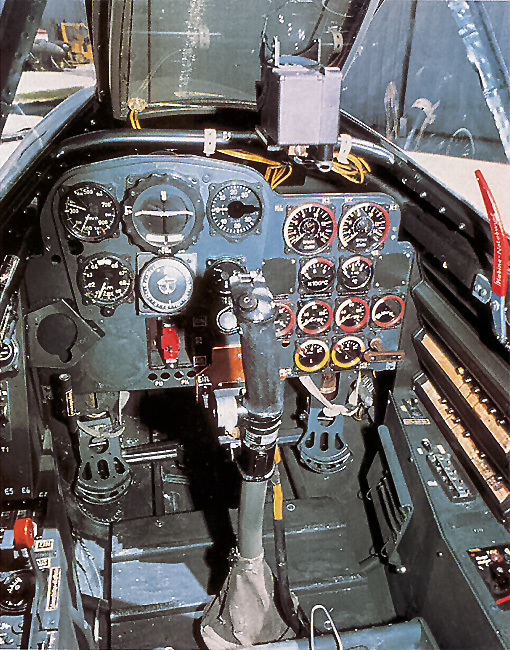
Me 262 cockpit

Test flights continued over the next year, but engine problems continued to plague the project, the Jumo 004 being only marginally more reliable than the lower-thrust (7.83 kN/1,760 lbf) BMW 003. Early engines were so short-lived that they frequently needed replacement after only a single flight. Airframe modifications were complete by 1942 but, hampered by the lack of engines, serial production did not begin until 1944, and deliveries were low, with 28 Me 262s in June, 59 in July, but only 20 in August.

By mid-1943, the Jumo 004A engine had passed several 100-hour tests, with a time between overhauls of 50 hours being achieved. However, the Jumo 004A engine proved unsuitable for full-scale production because of its considerable weight and its high utilization of strategic materials (nickel, cobalt, molybdenum), which were in short supply. Consequently, the 004B engine was designed to use a minimum amount of strategic materials. All high heat-resistant metal parts, including the combustion chamber, were changed to mild steel (SAE 1010) and were protected only against oxidation by aluminum coating. The engine represented a design compromise to minimize the use of strategic materials and to simplify manufacture. With the lower-quality steels used in the 004B, the engine required overhaul after just 25 hours for a metallurgical test on the turbine. If it passed the test, the engine was refitted for a further 10 hours of usage, but 35 hours marked the absolute limit for the turbine wheel. Frank Whittle concludes in his final assessment over the two engines: "it was in the quality of high temperature materials that the difference between German and British engines was most marked"

Operationally, carrying 2,000 litres (440 imperial gallons; 530 US gallons) of fuel in two 900-litre (200-imperial-gallon; 240-US-gallon) tanks, one each fore and aft of the cockpit; and a 200-litre (44-imperial-gallon; 53-US-gallon) ventral fuselage tank beneath, (Note: According to Stapfer, the smaller fuel tank had a capacity of up to 237.75 US gallons (197.97 imperial gallons; 900.0 litres).) the Me 262 would have a total flight endurance of 60 to 90 minutes. Fuel was usually J2 (derived from brown coal), with the option of diesel or a mixture of oil and high octane B4 aviation petrol. Fuel consumption was double the rate of typical twin-engine fighter aircraft of the era, which led to the installation of a low-fuel warning indicator in the cockpit that notified pilots when remaining fuel fell below 250 L (55 imp gal; 66 US gal).

Unit cost for an Me 262 airframe, less engines, armament, and electronics, was 87,400 ℛ︁ℳ︁. (Note: By comparison, a new Volkswagen Type 1 was priced at RM990.) To build one airframe took around 6,400-man-hours.

== Operational history ==
=== Introduction ===
On 19 April 1944, Erprobungskommando 262 was formed at Lechfeld just south of Augsburg, as a test unit (Jäger Erprobungskommando Thierfelder, commanded by Hauptmann Werner Thierfelder) to introduce the Me 262 into service and train a corps of pilots to fly it. However, on 18 July 1944, Thierfelder was killed in a crash while piloting his Me 262, which had caught fire. On 26 July 1944, Leutnant Alfred Schreiber, while flying over Munich, with the 262 A-1a W.Nr. 130 017, encountered a Mosquito PR Mark XVI reconnaissance aircraft, of No. 540 Squadron RAF, piloted by Fl. Lt. A.E. Wall. Schreiber attempted to shoot down the unarmed Mosquito, though Wall evaded Schreiber's three attack runs, to land safely at Fermo, Italy, after the first air-to-air use of a jet fighter. Sources state the Mosquito had a hatch fall out, during the evasive manoeuvres, though the aircraft returned to RAF Benson on 27 July 1944, and remained in service until it was lost in a landing in October 1950. On 8 August 1944, Lt. Joachim Weber of EKdo 262 claimed the first kill by a 262, of a reconnaissance Mosquito, PR.IX LR433, of 540 squadron, over Munich, killing the pilot, Fl. Lt. Desmond Laurence Mattewman and navigator Flight Sergeant William Stopford.

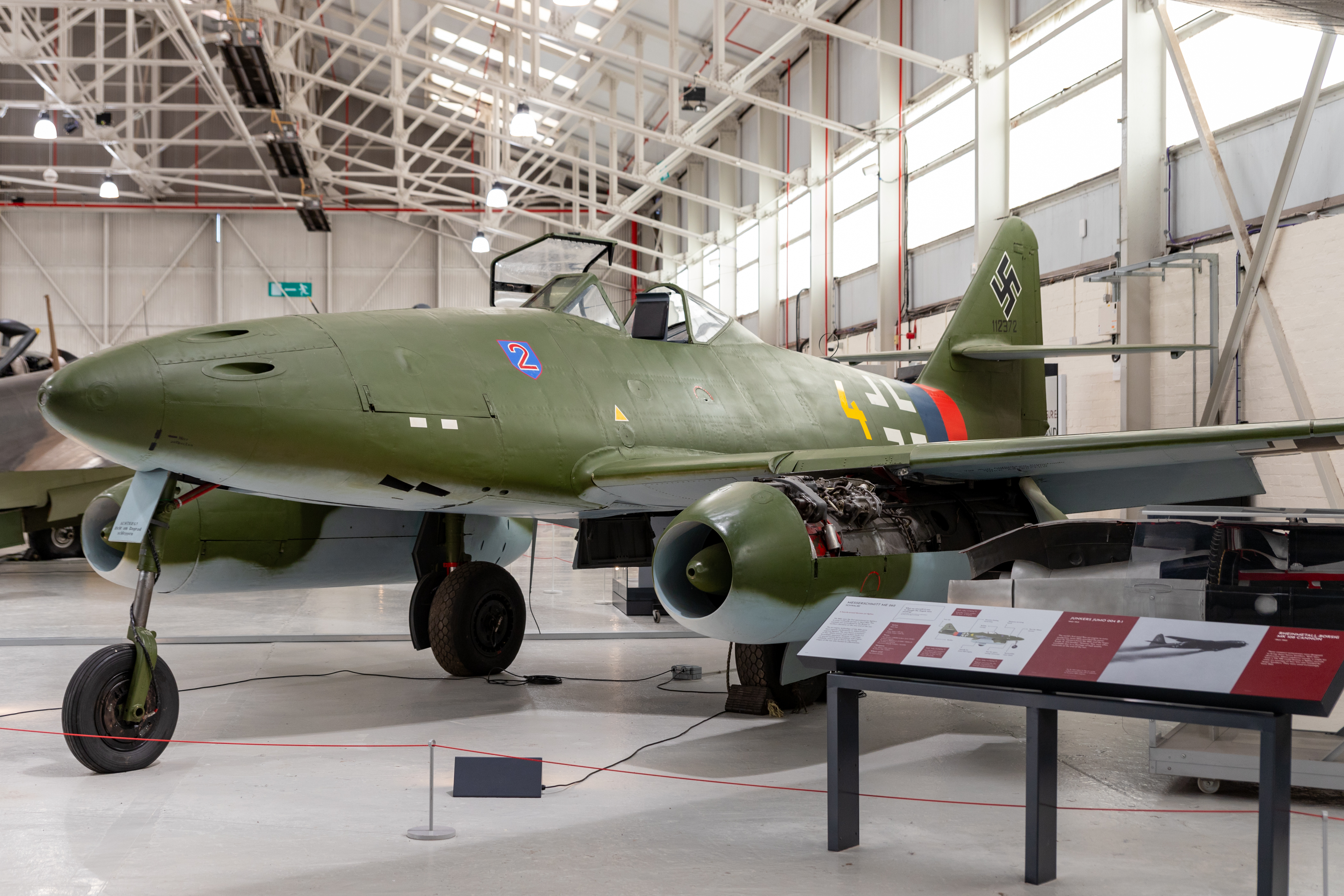
Me 262 A-1a on display at RAF Cosford.

After Thierfelder's death, Major Walter Nowotny was assigned as commander on 25 September 1944, and the unit was redesignated Kommando Nowotny. Though essentially a trials and development unit, it mounted the world's first jet fighter operations, beginning on 3 October 1944. Despite orders to stay grounded, Nowotny flew a mission on 8 November 1944 against an enemy bomber formation at some 9,100 m (30,000 ft). He claimed two P-51D Mustangs before suffering engine failure at high altitude. While diving and trying to restart his engines, he was attacked by other Mustangs, forced to bail out, and died. The Kommando was withdrawn for further flight training and a revision of combat tactics to optimise the Me 262's strengths. By 16 November 1944, 28 of the unit's 30 Me 262s had been damaged or destroyed, against 24 claimed kills.

Accounts conflict on the first confirmed kill of an Me262. One version is that the first kill was when a Me 262A-2a Sturmvogel of III.Gruppe/KG 51 'Edelweiß' based at Rheine-Hopsten Air Base near Osnabrück on 26 November 1944. The Me 262 was shot down by a Bofors gun of B.11 Detachment of 2875 Squadron RAF Regiment at the RAF forward airfield of Helmond, near Eindhoven. Another version is that the 71st Light Anti-Aircraft Regiment, at the time part of the 100th Anti-Aircraft Brigade, scored the first confirmed kill in September 1944 while operating outside Antwerp. (Note: The 71st LAA Rgt's War Diaries claim the exact place and date to be 8 September 1944 near Diest, South East of Antwerp, though 106th AA Bde and Routledge reported the kill confirmed on 17 September. 71st LAA Rgt was actually under the command of 100th AA Bde at the time of the kill, however, transferring to 106th AA Bde on 13 September.) Others were lost to ground fire on 17 and 18 December when Helmond airfield was attacked again, this time at intervals by a total of 18 Me 262s and the guns of 2873 and 2875 Squadrons RAF Regiment damaged several, causing at least two to crash within a few miles of the airfield. In February 1945, a B.6 gun detachment of 2809 Squadron RAF Regiment shot down another Me 262 over the airfield of Volkel. The final appearance of Me 262s over Volkel was in 1945 when yet another fell to 2809's guns.

By January 1945, Jagdgeschwader 7 (JG 7) had been formed as a pure jet fighter wing, partly based at Parchim, although it was several weeks before it was operational. In the meantime, a bomber unit—I Gruppe, Kampfgeschwader 54 (KG(J) 54)—redesignated as such on 1 October 1944 through being re-equipped with, and trained to use the Me 262A-2a fighter-bomber for use in a ground-attack role. However, the unit lost 12 jets in action in two weeks for minimal returns. Jagdverband 44 (JV 44) was another Me 262 fighter unit, of squadron (Staffel) size given the low numbers of available personnel, formed in February 1945 by Lieutenant General Adolf Galland, who had recently been dismissed as Inspector of Fighters. Galland was able to draw into the unit many of the most experienced and decorated Luftwaffe fighter pilots from other units grounded by lack of fuel.

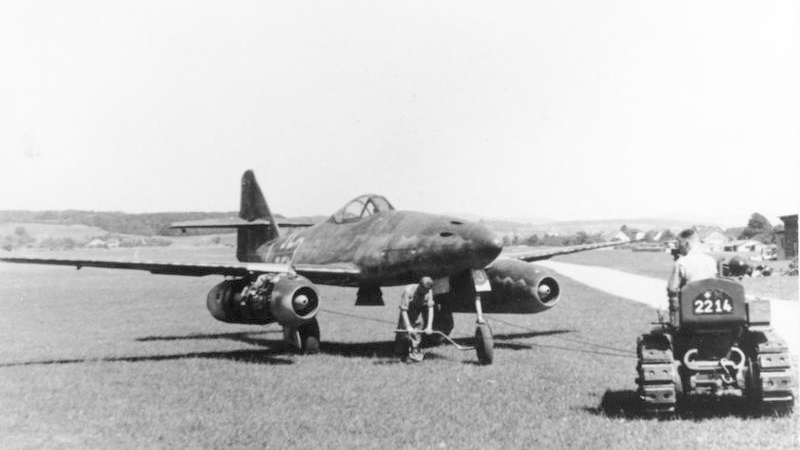
Me 262 A in 1945

During March, Me 262 fighter units were able, for the first time, to mount large-scale attacks on Allied bomber formations. On 18 March 1945, thirty-seven Me 262s of JG 7 intercepted a force of 1,221 bombers and 632 escorting fighters. They shot down 12 bombers and one fighter for the loss of three Me 262s. Although a 4:1 ratio was exactly what the Luftwaffe would have needed to make an impact on the war, the absolute scale of their success was minor, as it represented only 1% of the attacking force.

In the last days of the conflict, Me 262s from JG 7 and other units were committed in ground assault missions, in an attempt to support German troops fighting Red Army forces. Just south of Berlin, halfway between Spremberg and the German capital, the Wehrmacht's 9th Army (with elements from the 12 Army and 4th Panzer Army) was assaulting the Red Army's 1st Ukrainian Front. To support this attack, on 24 April, JG 7 dispatched thirty-one Me 262s on a strafing mission in the Cottbus-Bautzen area. Luftwaffe pilots claimed six lorries and seven Soviet aircraft, but three German jets were lost. On the evening of 27 April, thirty-six Me 262s from JG 7, III.KG(J)6 and KJ(J)54 were sent against Soviet forces that were attacking German troops in the forests north-east of Baruth. They succeeded in strafing 65 Soviet lorries, after which the Me 262s intercepted low flying Il-2 Sturmoviks searching for German tanks. The jet pilots claimed six Sturmoviks for the loss of three Messerschmitts. During operations between 28 April and 1 May Soviet fighters and ground fire downed at least ten more Me 262s from JG 7.

However, JG 7 managed to keep its jets operational until the end of the war. And on 8 May, at around 4:00 p.m. Oblt. Fritz Stehle of 2./JG 7, while flying a Me 262 on the Ore Mountains, attacked a formation of Soviet aircraft. He claimed a Yakovlev Yak-9, but the aircraft shot down was probably a P-39 Airacobra. Soviet records show that they lost two Airacobras, one of them probably downed by Stehle, who would thus have scored the last Luftwaffe air victory of the war.

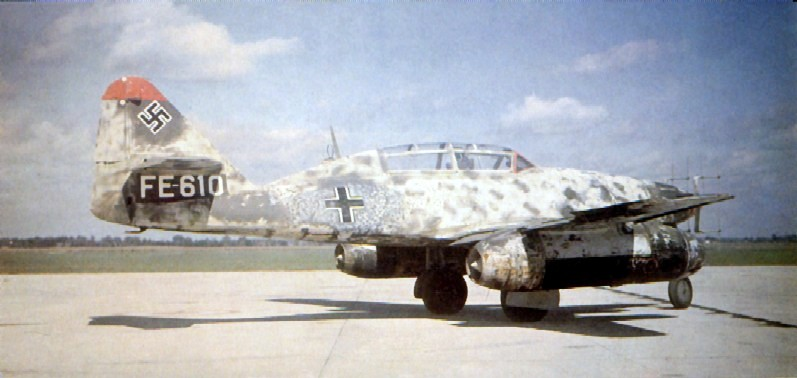
Me 262B-1a/U1 night fighter, Wrknr. 110306, with FuG 218 Neptun antennae in the nose and second seat for a radar operator. This airframe was surrendered to the RAF at Schleswig in May 1945 and tested in the UK

Several two-seat trainer variants of the Me 262, the Me 262 B-1a, had been adapted through the Umrüst-Bausatz 1 factory refit package as night fighters, complete with on-board FuG 218 Neptun high-VHF band radar, using Hirschgeweih ("stag's antlers") antennae with a set of dipole elements shorter than the Lichtenstein SN-2 had used, as the B-1a/U1 version. Serving with 10. Staffel Nachtjagdgeschwader 11, near Berlin, these few aircraft (alongside several single-seat examples) accounted for most of the 13 Mosquitoes lost over Berlin in the first three months of 1945. Intercepts were generally or entirely made using Wilde Sau methods, rather than aircraft interception radar-controlled interception. As the two-seat trainer was largely unavailable, many pilots made their first jet flight in a single-seater without an instructor.

Despite its deficiencies, the Me 262 clearly marked the beginning of the end of piston-engined aircraft as effective fighting machines. Once airborne, it could accelerate to speeds over 850 km/h (530 mph), about 150 km/h (93 mph) faster than any Allied fighter operational in the European Theater of Operations.

The Me 262's top ace (Note: For a list of Luftwaffe jet aces, see List of German World War II jet aces) was probably Hauptmann Franz Schall with 17 kills, including six four-engine bombers and ten P-51 Mustang fighters, although fighter ace Oberleutnant Kurt Welter claimed 25 Mosquitos and two four-engine bombers shot down by night and two further Mosquitos by day. Most of Welter's claimed night kills were achieved by eye, even though Welter had tested a prototype Me 262 fitted with FuG 218 Neptun radar. Another candidate for top ace on the aircraft was Oberstleutnant Heinrich Bär, who is credited with 16 enemy aircraft while flying Me 262s out of his total of 240 aircraft shot down.

=== Anti-bomber tactics ===
The Me 262 was so fast that German pilots needed new tactics to attack Allied bombers. In a head-on attack, the combined closing speed of about 320 m/s (720 mph) was too high for accurate shooting with the relatively slow firing 30mm MK 108 cannon – at about 650 rounds/min this gave around 44 rounds per second from all four guns. Even from astern, the closing speed was too great to use the short-ranged cannon to maximum effect. A roller-coaster attack was devised, the Me 262s approached from astern and about 1,800 m higher (5,900 ft) than the bombers. From about five km (3.1 mi) behind, they went into a shallow dive that took them through the escort fighters with little risk of interception. When they were about 1.5 km (0.93 mi) astern and 450 m (1,480 ft) below the bombers, they pulled up sharply to reduce speed. On levelling off, they were one km (1,100 yd) astern and overtaking the bombers at about 150 km/h (90 mph) relative speed, well placed to attack them.

Since the short barrels of the MK 108 cannon and low muzzle velocity – 500 m/s (1,600 ft/s) – rendered it inaccurate beyond 600 m (660 yd), coupled with the jet's velocity, which required breaking off at 200 m (220 yd) to avoid colliding with the target, Me 262 pilots normally commenced firing at 500 m (550 yd). Gunners of Allied bomber aircraft found their electrically powered gun turrets had problems tracking the jets. Aiming was difficult because the jets closed into firing range quickly and remained in firing position only briefly, using their standard attack profile, which proved more effective.

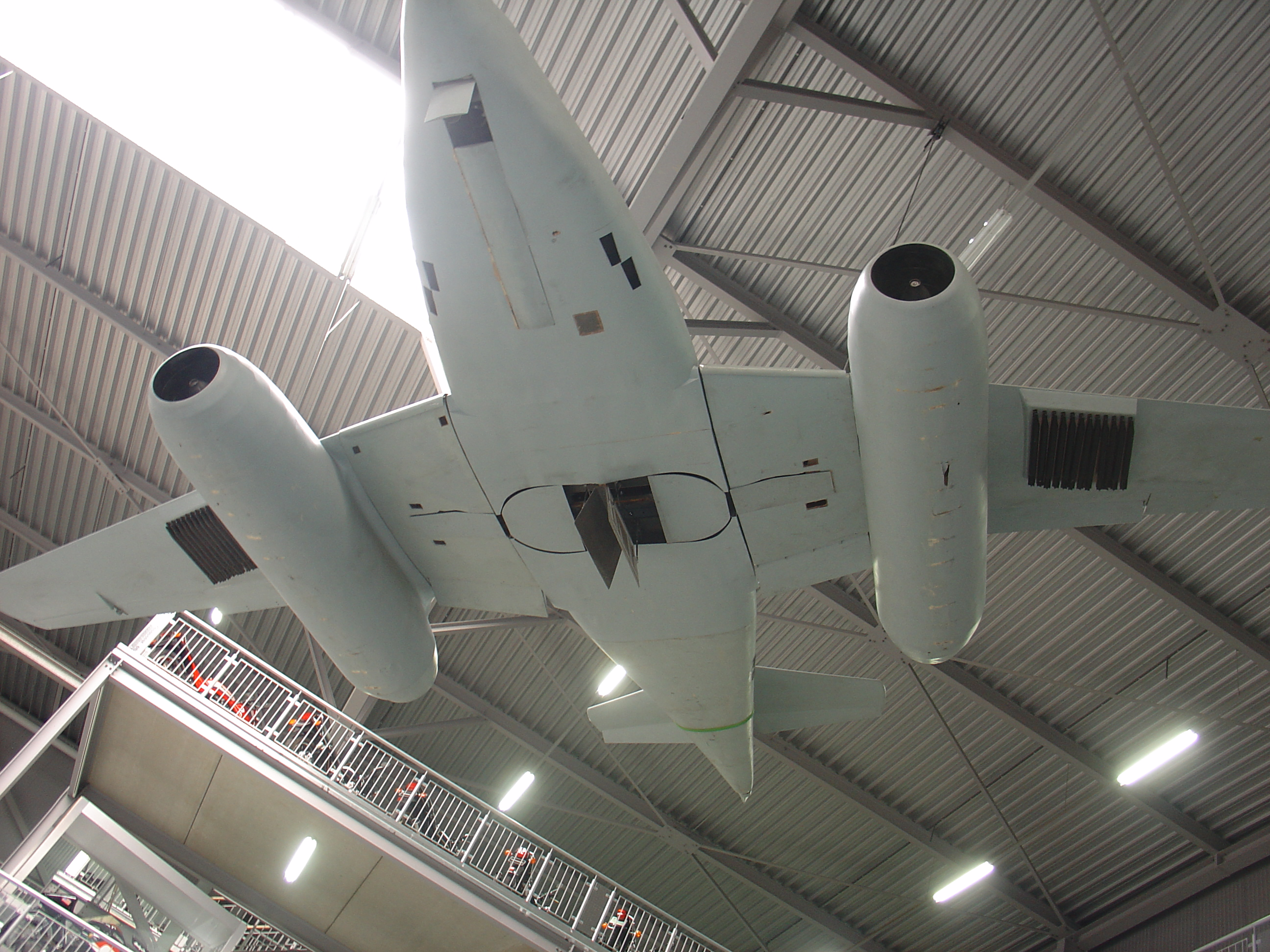
Mock-up of an Me 262A-1a/R7 with R4M underwing rocket racks on display at the Technikmuseum Speyer, Germany

A prominent Royal Navy test pilot, Captain Eric Brown, chief naval test pilot and commanding officer of the Captured Enemy Aircraft Flight Royal Aircraft Establishment, who tested the Me 262 noted that:

This was a Blitzkrieg aircraft. You whack in at your bomber. It was never meant to be a dogfighter, it was meant to be a destroyer of bombers... The great problem with it was it did not have dive brakes. For example, if you want to fight and destroy a B-17, you come in on a dive. The 30mm cannon were not so accurate beyond 600 metres [660 yd; 2,000 ft]. So you normally came in at 600 yards [550 m; 1,800 ft] and would open fire on your B-17. And your closing speed was still high and since you had to break away at 200 metres [220 yd; 660 ft] to avoid a collision, you only had two seconds firing time. Now, in two seconds, you can't sight. You can fire randomly and hope for the best. If you want to sight and fire, you need to double that time to four seconds. And with dive brakes, you could have done that.

Eventually, German pilots developed new tactics to counter Allied bombers. Me 262s, equipped with up to 24 unguided folding-fin R4M rockets—12 in each of two underwing racks, outboard of the engine nacelles—approached from the side of a bomber formation, where their silhouettes were widest and while still out of range of the bombers' machine guns, fired a salvo of rockets. One or two hits with these rockets could shoot down even the famously rugged Boeing B-17 Flying Fortress, from the "metal-shattering" brisant effect of the fast-flying rocket's 520 g (18 oz) explosive warhead. The much bigger BR 21 large-calibre rockets, fired from their tubular launchers under the nose of the Me 262A (one either side of the nosewheel well) were only as fast as MK 108 rounds.

Though this broadside-attack tactic was effective, it came too late to have a real effect on the war and only small numbers of Me 262s were equipped with the rocket packs; most were Me 262A-1a models, of Jagdgeschwader 7. This method of attacking bombers became the standard and mass deployment of Ruhrstahl X-4 guided missiles was cancelled. Some nicknamed this tactic the Luftwaffe's Wolf Pack, as the fighters often made runs in groups of two or three, fired their rockets, then returned to base. On 1 September 1944, USAAF General Carl Spaatz expressed the fear that if greater numbers of German jets appeared, they could inflict losses heavy enough to force cancellation of the Allied bombing offensive by daylight.

=== Counter-jet tactics ===
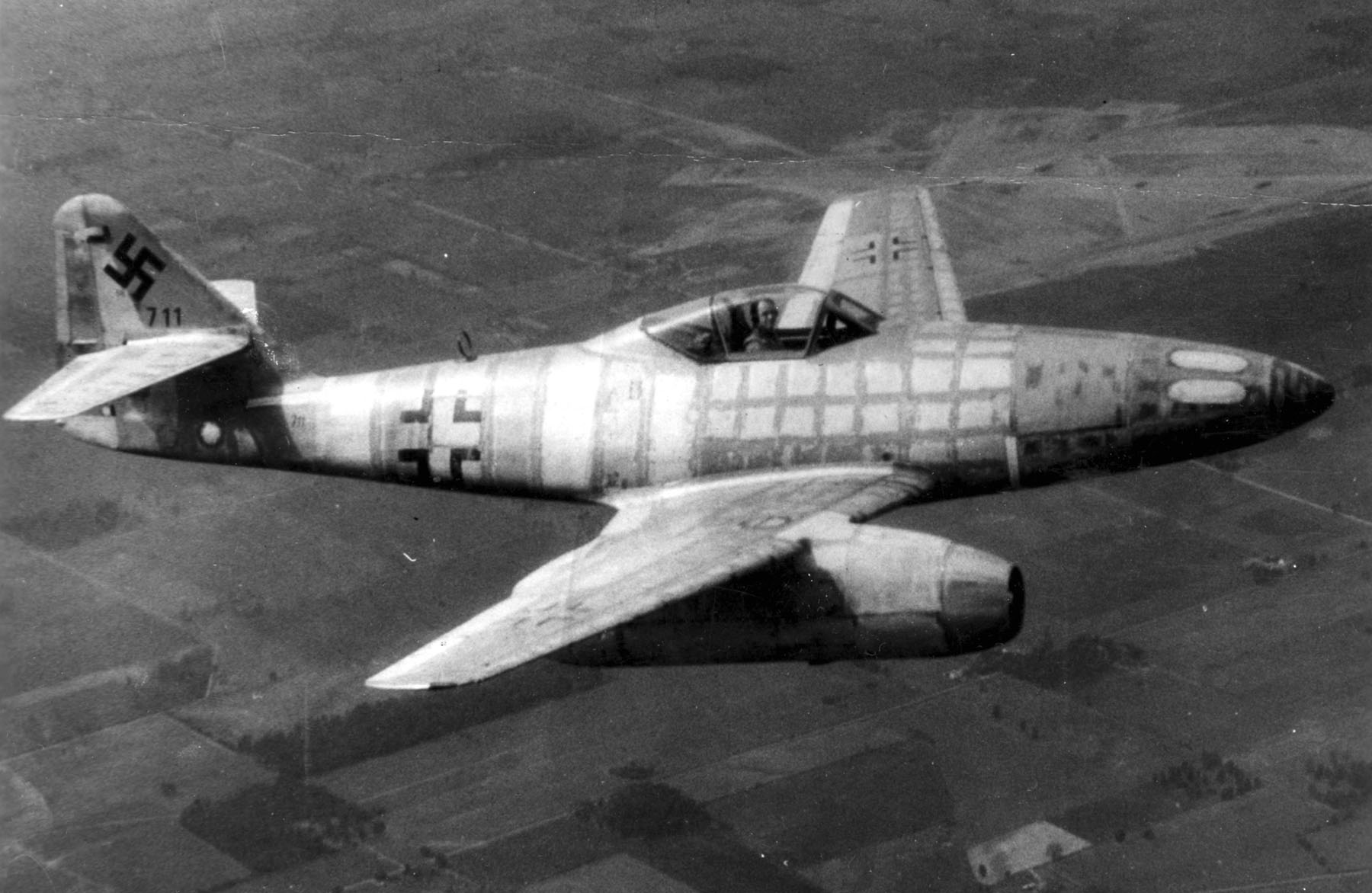
This airframe, Wrknr. 111711, was the first Me 262 to come into Allied hands when its German test pilot defected on 31 March 1945. The aircraft was then shipped to the United States for testing.

The Me 262 was difficult to counter because its high speed and rate of climb made it hard to intercept. However, as with other turbojet engines at the time, the Me 262's engines did not provide sufficient thrust at low airspeeds and throttle response was slow, so that in certain circumstances such as takeoff and landing the aircraft became a vulnerable target. Another disadvantage that pioneering jet aircraft of the World War II era shared, was the high risk of compressor stall and if throttle movements were too rapid, the engine(s) could suffer a flameout. The coarse opening of the throttle would cause fuel surging and lead to excessive jet pipe temperatures. Pilots were instructed to operate the throttle gently and avoid quick changes. German engineers introduced an automatic throttle regulator later in the war but it only partly alleviated the problem.

The aircraft had, by contemporary standards, a high wing loading (294.0 kg/m^{2}, 60.2 lbs/ft^{2}) that required higher takeoff and landing speeds. Due to poor throttle response, the engines' tendency for airflow disruption that could cause the compressor to stall was ubiquitous. The high speed of the Me 262 also presented problems when engaging enemy aircraft, the high-speed convergence allowing Me 262 pilots little time to line up their targets or acquire the appropriate amount of deflection. This problem faces any aircraft that approaches another from behind at much higher speed, as the slower aircraft in front can always pull a tighter turn, forcing the faster aircraft to overshoot.

I passed one that looked as if it was hanging motionless in the air (I am too fast!). The one above me went into a steep right-hand turn, his pale blue underside standing out against the purple sky. Another banked right in front of the Me's nose. Violent jolt as I flew through his airscrew eddies. Maybe a wing's length away. That one in the gentle left-hand curve! Swing her round. I was coming from underneath, eye glued to the sight (pull her tighter!). A throbbing in the wings as my cannon pounded briefly. Missed him. Way behind his tail. It was exasperating. I would never be able to shoot one down like this. They were like a sack of fleas. A prick of doubt: is this really such a good fighter? Could one in fact, successfully attack a group of erratically banking fighters with the Me 262?

— Johannes Steinhoff, Luftwaffe fighter ace

Luftwaffe pilots eventually learned how to handle the Me 262's higher speed and the Me 262 soon proved a formidable air superiority fighter, with pilots such as Franz Schall managing to shoot down seventeen enemy fighters in the Me 262, ten of them American North American P-51 Mustangs. Me 262 aces included Georg-Peter Eder, with twelve enemy fighters (including nine P-51s) to his credit, Erich Rudorffer also with twelve enemy fighters to his credit, Walther Dahl with eleven (including three Lavochkin La-7s and six P-51s) and Heinz-Helmut Baudach with six (including one Spitfire and two P-51s) amongst many others.

Pilots soon learned that the Me 262 was quite maneuverable despite its high wing loading and lack of low-speed thrust, especially if attention was drawn to its effective maneuvering speeds. The controls were light and effective right up to the maximum permissible speed and perfectly harmonised. The inclusion of full span automatic leading-edge slats, (Note: The leading edge slats, manufactured by Arwa Strumpfwerke of Auerbach, were divided into three unconnected sections on each wing and each was fastened to the wing by two hinges. The slats lowered the stalling speed of the aircraft to roughly 160 to 170 km/h (86 to 92 kn; 99 to 106 mph) depending on load out. They deployed automatically below 300 km/h (160 kn; 190 mph) on takeoff or landing and at 450 km/h (240 kn; 280 mph) in turn or climb.) something of a "tradition" on Messerschmitt fighters dating back to the original Bf 109's outer wing slots of a similar type, helped increase the overall lift produced by the wing by as much as 35% in tight turns or at low speeds, greatly improving the aircraft's turn performance as well as its landing and takeoff characteristics. As many pilots soon found out, the Me 262's clean design also meant that it, like all jets, held its speed in tight turns much better than conventional propeller-driven fighters, which was a great potential advantage in a dogfight as it meant better energy retention in manoeuvres.

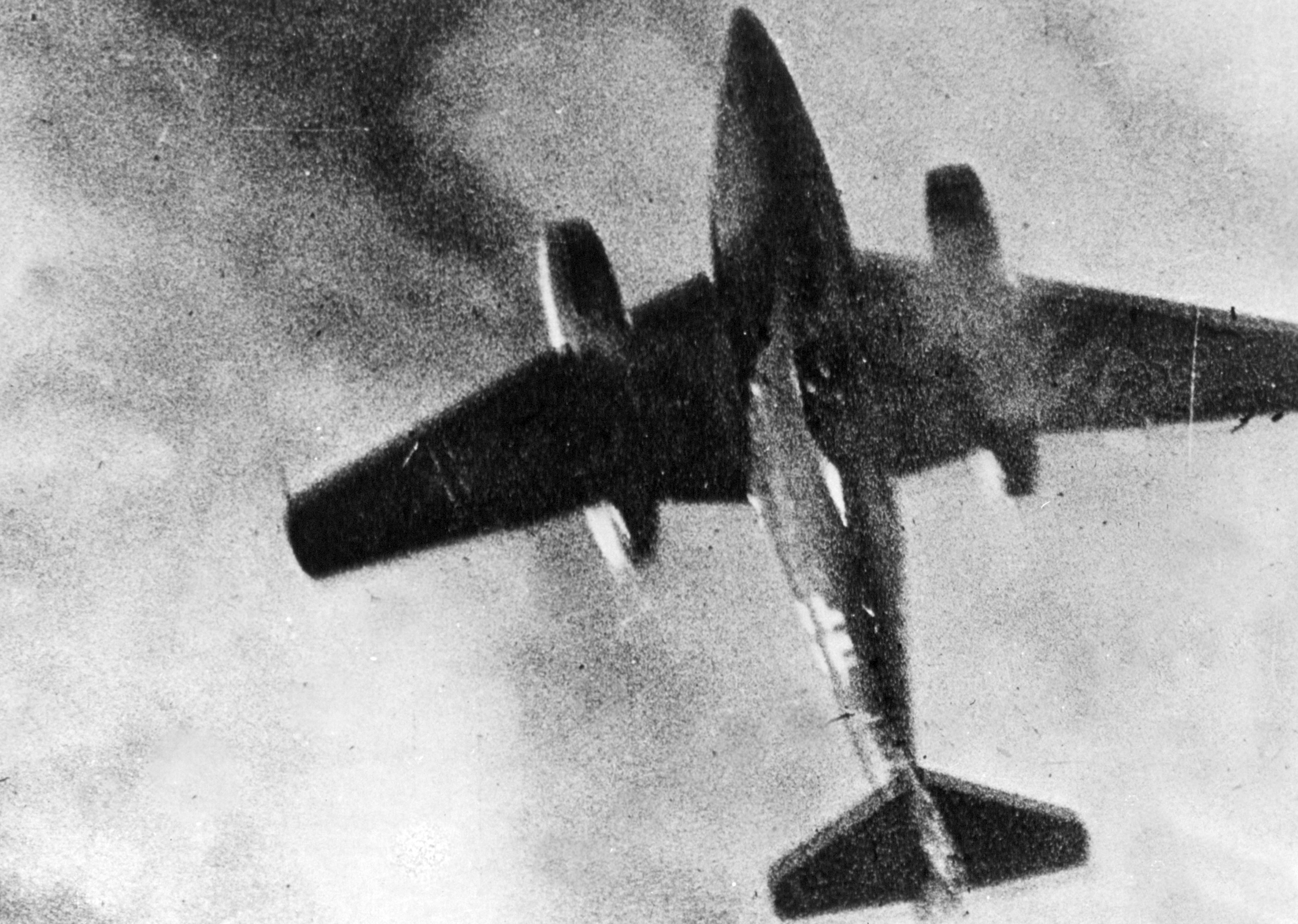
Me 262 being shot down, as seen from USAAF P-51 Mustang gun camera, January 1945. Note the jettisoned canopy and empty cockpit.

Too fast to catch for the escorting Allied fighters, the Me 262s were almost impossible to head off. (Note: According to aviation historian Mike Spick, it could take eight Mustangs to neutralize a single Me 262, by continually cutting across the circle inside it. Against multiple jet attackers, an effective defense was simply impossible.) As a result, Me 262 pilots were relatively safe from the Allied fighters, as long as they did not allow themselves to get drawn into low-speed turning contests and saved their maneuvering for higher speeds. Combating the Allied fighters could be effectively done the same way as the U.S. fighters fought the more nimble, but slower, Japanese fighters in the Pacific.

Allied pilots soon found that the only reliable way to destroy the jets, as with the even faster Me 163B Komet rocket fighters, was to attack them on the ground or during takeoff or landing. As the Me 262A's pioneering Junkers Jumo 004 axial-flow jet engines needed careful nursing by their pilots, these jet aircraft were particularly vulnerable during takeoff and landing. Luftwaffe airfields identified as jet bases were frequently bombed by medium bombers, and Allied fighters patrolled over the fields to attack jets trying to land. The Luftwaffe countered by installing extensive "Flak alleys" of anti-aircraft guns along the approach lines to protect the Me 262s from the ground—and by providing top cover during the jets' takeoff and landing with the most advanced Luftwaffe single-engined fighters, the Focke-Wulf Fw 190D and (just becoming available in 1945) Focke-Wulf Ta 152H. Nevertheless, in March–April 1945, Allied fighter patrol patterns over Me 262 airfields resulted in numerous jet losses.

On 5 October 1944, Hpt. Hans-Christoph Buttmann's Me 262 was shot down near Overasselt by a Supermarine Spitfire LF Mk IX from No. 401 Squadron of the Royal Canadian Air Force. This was the first aerial victory over a jet aircraft in history. Lt. Chuck Yeager of the 357th Fighter Group was one of the first American pilots to shoot down an Me 262, which he caught during its landing approach. On 7 October 1944, Lt. Urban Drew of the 365th Fighter Group shot down two Me 262s that were taking off, while on the same day Lt. Col. Hubert Zemke, who had transferred to the Mustang equipped 479th Fighter Group, shot down what he thought was a Bf 109, only to have his gun camera film reveal that it may have been an Me 262. On 25 February 1945, Mustangs of the 55th Fighter Group surprised an entire Staffel of Me 262As at takeoff and destroyed six jets.

The British Hawker Tempest scored several kills against the new German jets, including the Me 262. Hubert Lange, a Me 262 pilot, said: "the Messerschmitt Me 262's most dangerous opponent was the British Hawker Tempest—extremely fast at low altitudes, highly manoeuvrable and heavily armed." Some were destroyed with a tactic known to the Tempest-equipped No. 135 Wing RAF as the "Rat Scramble": Tempests on immediate alert took off when an Me 262 was reported airborne. They did not intercept the jet, but instead flew towards the Me 262 and Ar 234 base at Hopsten air base. (Note: Other aircraft based there included Bf 109 and Fw 190-day fighters and Bf 110 and He 219 night fighters. The base was closer to the town of Hopsten than the city of Rheine and is no longer active.) The aim was to attack jets on their landing approach, when they were at their most vulnerable, travelling slowly, with flaps down and incapable of rapid acceleration. The German response was the construction of a "flak lane" of over 150 emplacements of the 20 mm Flakvierling quadruple autocannon batteries at Rheine-Hopsten to protect the approaches. (Note: As well as the flak guns, several piston engine fighter units based in the area were tasked to cover the jets as they landed.) After seven Tempests were lost to flak at Hopsten in a week, the "Rat Scramble" was discontinued.

=== High-speed research ===
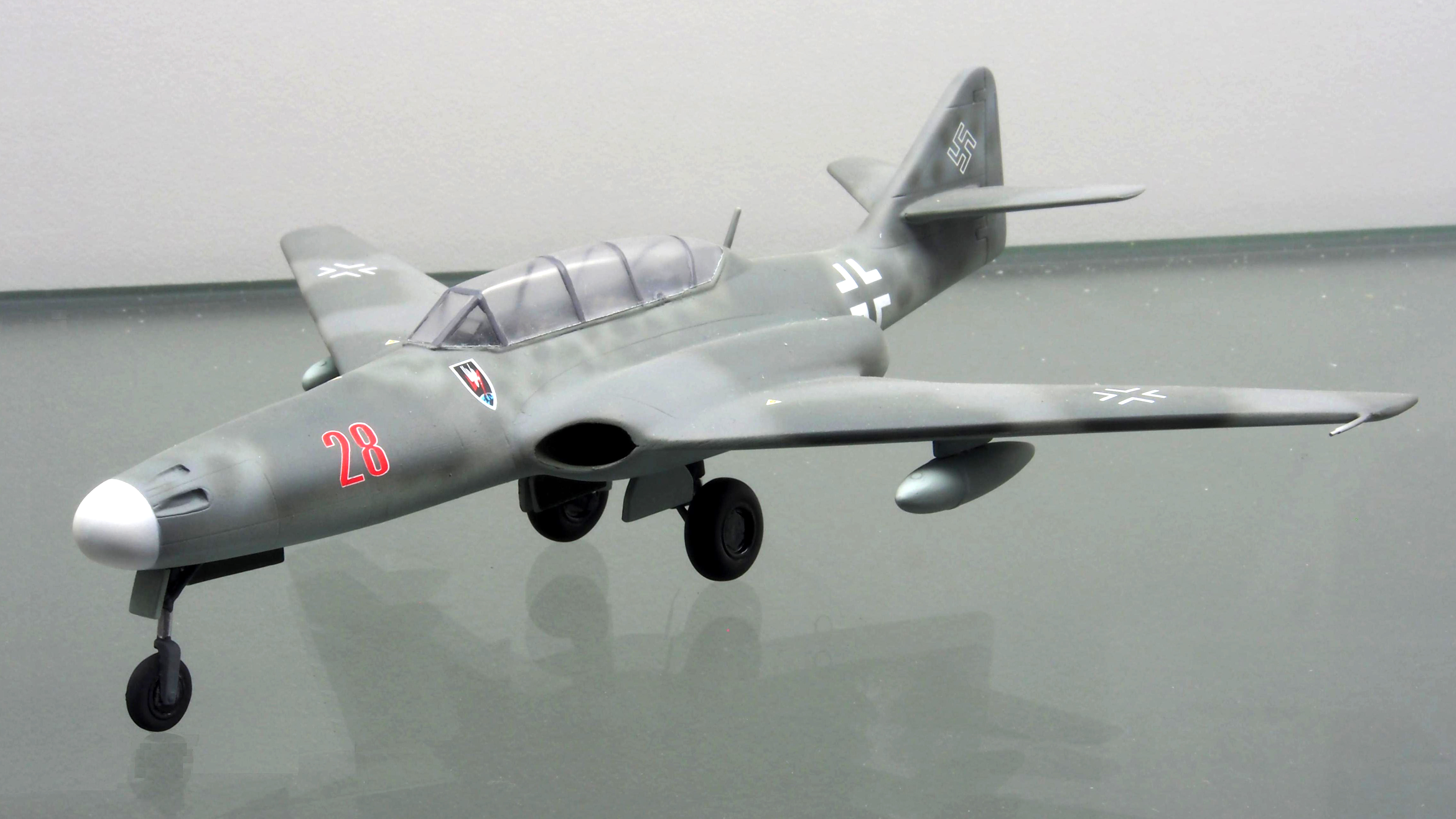
Scale model of one of the Me 262 HG III versions at the Technikmuseum Speyer

Adolf Busemann had proposed swept wings as early as 1935; Messerschmitt researched the topic from 1940. In April 1941, Busemann proposed fitting a 35° swept wing (Pfeilflügel II, literally "arrow wing II") to the Me 262, the same wing-sweep angle later used on both the North American F-86 Sabre and Soviet Mikoyan-Gurevich MiG-15 fighter jets. Though this was not implemented, he continued with the projected HG II and HG III (Hochgeschwindigkeit, "high-speed") derivatives in 1944, designed with a 35° and 45° wing sweep, respectively.

Interest in high-speed flight, which led him to initiate work on swept wings starting in 1940, is evident from the advanced developments Messerschmitt had on his drawing board in 1944. While the Me 262 V9 Hochgeschwindigkeit I (HG I) flight-tested in 1944 had only small changes compared to combat aircraft, most notably a low-profile canopy—tried as the Rennkabine (literally "racing cabin") on the ninth Me 262 prototype for a short time—to reduce drag, the HG II and HG III designs were far more radical. The projected HG II combined the low-drag canopy with a 35° wing sweep and a V-tail (butterfly tail). The HG III had a conventional tail, but a 45° wing sweep and turbines embedded in the wing roots.

Messerschmitt also conducted a series of flight tests with the series production Me 262. Dive tests determined that the Me 262 went out of control in a dive at Mach 0.86, and that higher Mach numbers would cause a nose-down trim that the pilot could not counter. The resulting steepening of the dive would lead to even higher speeds and the airframe would disintegrate from excessive negative g loads.

Messerschmitt believed the HG series of Me 262 derivatives was capable of reaching transonic Mach numbers in level flight, with the top speed of the HG III being projected as Mach 0.96 at 6,000 m (20,000 ft) altitude. After the war, the Royal Aircraft Establishment, at that time one of the leading institutions in high-speed research, re-tested the Me 262 to help with British attempts at exceeding Mach 1. The RAE achieved speeds of up to Mach 0.84 and confirmed the results from the Messerschmitt dive-tests. The Soviets ran similar tests.

After Willy Messerschmitt's death in 1978, the former Me 262 pilot Hans Guido Mutke claimed to have exceeded Mach 1 on 9 April 1945 in a Me 262 in a "straight-down" 90° dive. This claim relies solely on Mutke's memory of the incident, which recalls effects other Me 262 pilots observed below the speed of sound at high indicated airspeed, but with no altitude reading required to determine the speed. The pitot tube used to measure airspeed in aircraft can give falsely elevated readings as the pressure builds up inside the tube at high speeds. The Me 262 wing had only a slight sweep, incorporated for trim (center of gravity) reasons and likely would have suffered structural failure due to divergence at high transonic speeds. The Me 262 V9, Werknummer 130 004, with Stammkennzeichen of VI+AD, was prepared as the HG I test airframe with the low-profile Rennkabine racing-canopy and may have achieved an unofficial record speed for a turbojet-powered aircraft of 975 km/h (606 mph), altitude unspecified, even with the recorded wartime airspeed record being set on 6 July 1944, by another Messerschmitt design—the Me 163B V18 rocket fighter setting a 1,130 km/h (700 mph) record, but landing with a nearly disintegrated rudder surface.

US tests conducted at the Royal Aircraft base in Farnborough in October 1945 showed the ME 262 achieving 540 miles per hour (869 kph), with the engine at maximum RPM. The peak speed was achieved at 20,000 ft altitude.

=== Production ===
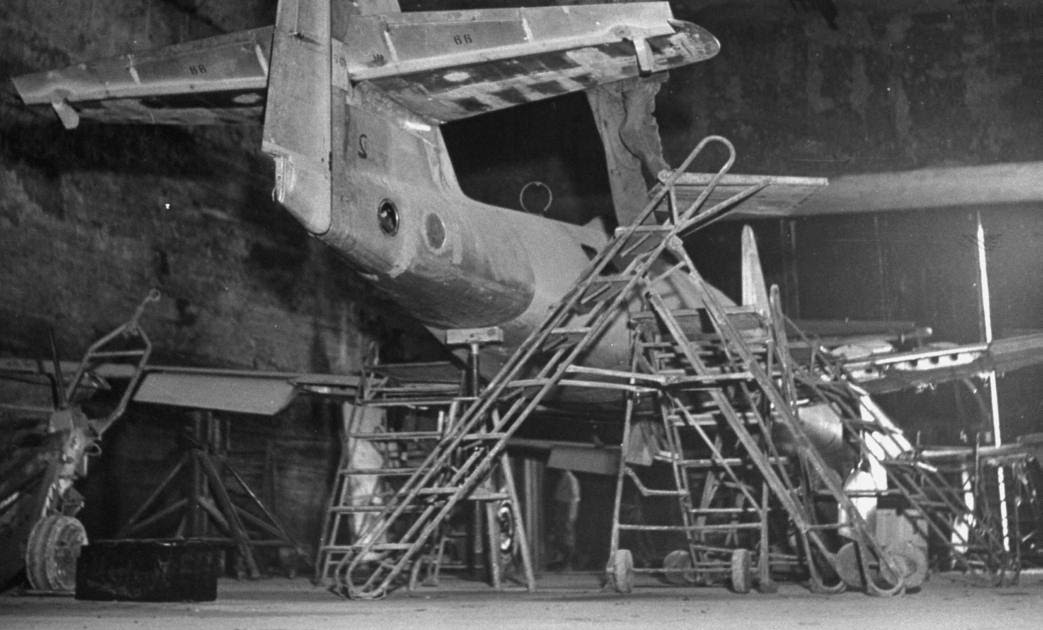
Underground manufacture of Me 262s

About 1,400 aircraft were produced; however, less than a hundred Me 262s were in a combat-ready condition at any one time. According to sources they destroyed from 300 to 450 enemy aircraft, with the Allies destroying about one hundred Me 262s in the air. While Germany was bombed intensively, production of the Me 262 was dispersed into low-profile production facilities, sometimes little more than clearings in the forests of Germany and occupied countries. From the end of February to the end of March 1945, approximately sixty Me 262s were destroyed in attacks on Obertraubling and thirty at Leipheim; the Neuburg jet plant itself was bombed on 19 March 1945.

Large, heavily protected underground factories were constructed – as with the partly-buried Weingut I complex for Jumo 004 jet engine production – to take up production of the Me 262, safe from bomb attacks. A disused mine complex under the Walpersberg mountain was adapted for the production of complete aircraft. These were hauled to the flat top of the hill where a runway had been cleared and flown out. Between 20 and 30 Me 262s were built here, the underground factory being overrun by Allied troops before it could reach a meaningful output. Wings were produced in Germany's oldest motorway tunnel at Engelberg, to the west of Stuttgart. At B8 Bergkristall-Esche II, a vast network of tunnels was excavated beneath St. Georgen/Gusen, Austria, where slave labourers of concentration camp Gusen II produced fully equipped fuselages for the Me 262 at a monthly rate of 450 units on large assembly lines from early 1945. Gusen II was known as one of the harshest concentration camps; the typical life expectancy was six months. An estimated 35,000 to 50,000 people died on the forced labour details for the Me 262.

=== Postwar history ===
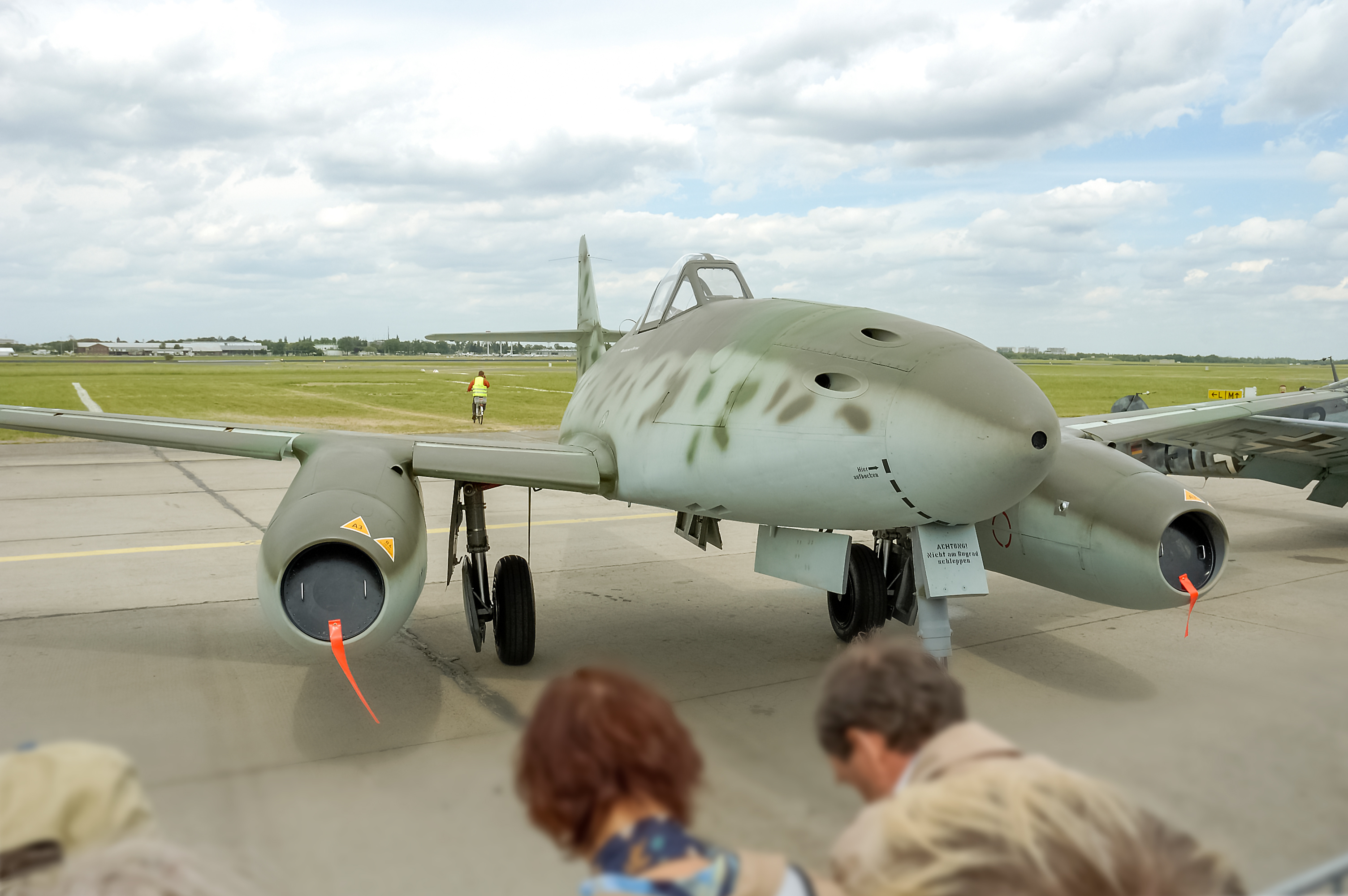
Reproduction of a Me 262 (A-1c) at the Berlin Air Show 2006

After the end of the war, the Me 262 and other advanced German technologies were quickly swept up by the Soviets, British, and Americans (as part of the USAAF's Operation Lusty). Many Me 262s were found in readily repairable condition and were confiscated. The Soviets, British and Americans wished to evaluate the technology, particularly the engines.

During testing, the Me 262 was found to be faster than the British Gloster Meteor jet fighter, and had better visibility to the sides and rear (mostly due to the canopy frames and the discoloration caused by the plastics used in the Meteor's construction), and was a superior gun platform to the Meteor F.1 which had a tendency to snake at high speed and exhibited "weak" aileron response. The Me 262 had a shorter range than the Meteor and had less reliable engines.

Captain Eric Brown, a British test pilot who flew 487 types of aircraft during his service, flew a captured Me 262 (as well as other German Second World War jets) after the end of the war. He referred to the Me 262 as "the most formidable aircraft of WW2." He noted that it had a number of innovatory features, but in terms of performance, was a quantum jump ahead of other aircraft at the time. In particular he noted its swept back wings, its axial flow jet engine, and the four powerful 30mm cannons. He stated that it was significantly faster than the fastest Spitfire (at the time) and with that speed "you could conduct combat totally on your own terms. If you didn't want to engage, you could go off and leave everyone standing."

The USAAF compared the Lockheed P-80 Shooting Star and Me 262, concluding that the Me 262 was superior in acceleration and speed, with similar climb performance. The Me 262 appeared to have a higher critical Mach number than any American fighter.

The Americans also tested an Me 262A-1a/U3 unarmed photo reconnaissance version, which was fitted with a fighter nose and a smooth finish. Between May and August 1946, the aircraft completed eight flights, lasting four hours and forty minutes. Testing was discontinued after four engine changes were required during the course of the tests, culminating in two single-engine landings. These aircraft were extensively studied, aiding development of early American, British and Soviet jet fighters. The F-86, designed by engineer Edgar Schmued, used a slat design based on the Me 262's.

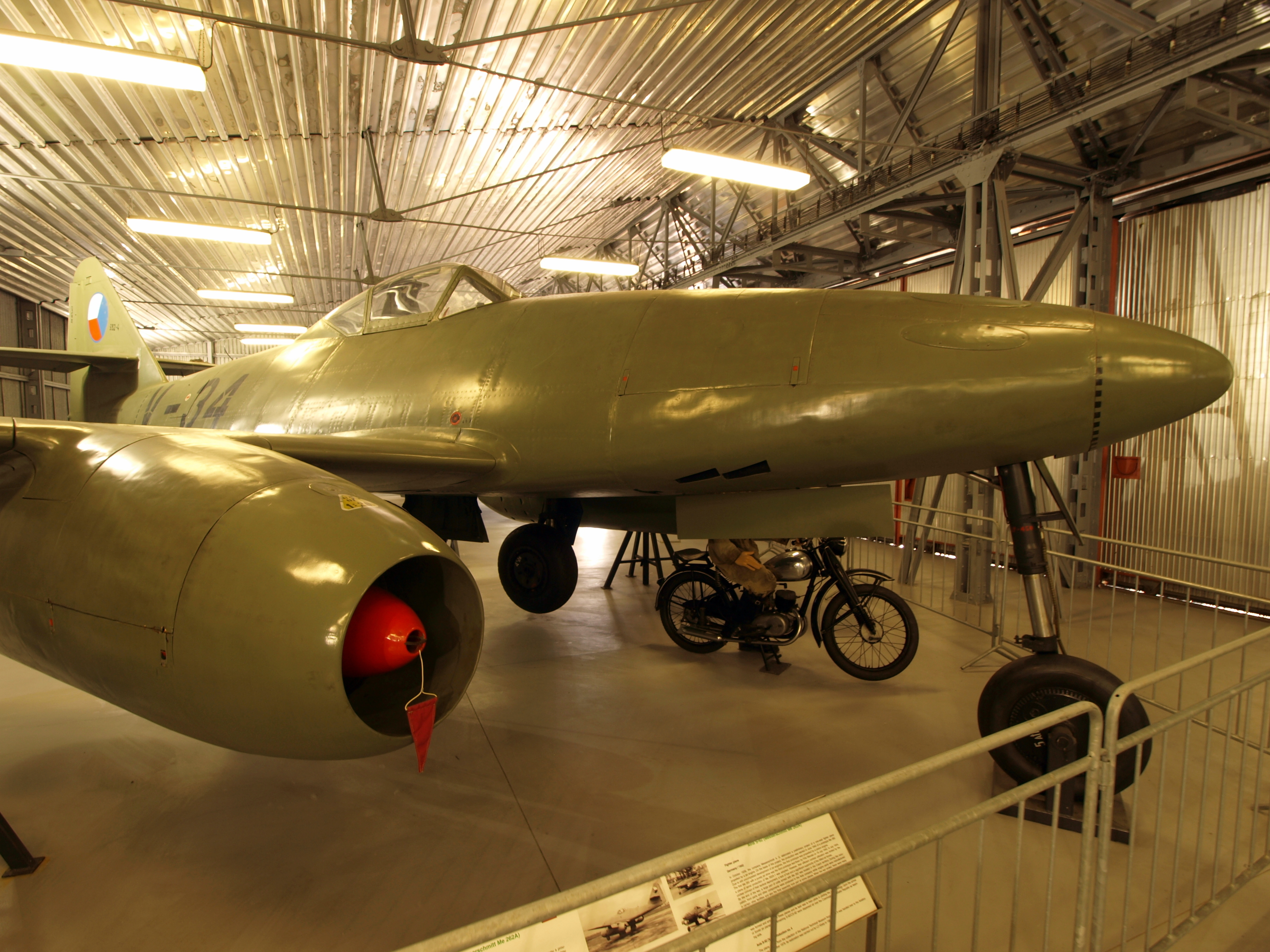
Avia S-92, Kbely Museum, Prague, 2012

The Czechoslovak aircraft industry continued to produce single-seat (Avia S-92) and two-seat (Avia CS-92) variants of the Me 262 after World War II. From August 1946, a total of nine S-92s and three two-seater CS-92s were completed and test flown. They were introduced in 1947 and in 1950 were supplied to the 5th Fighter Squadron, becoming the first jet fighters to serve in the Czechoslovak Air Force. These were kept flying until 1951, when they were replaced in service by Soviet jet fighters. Both versions are on display at the Prague Aviation museum in Kbely.

=== Flyable reproductions ===
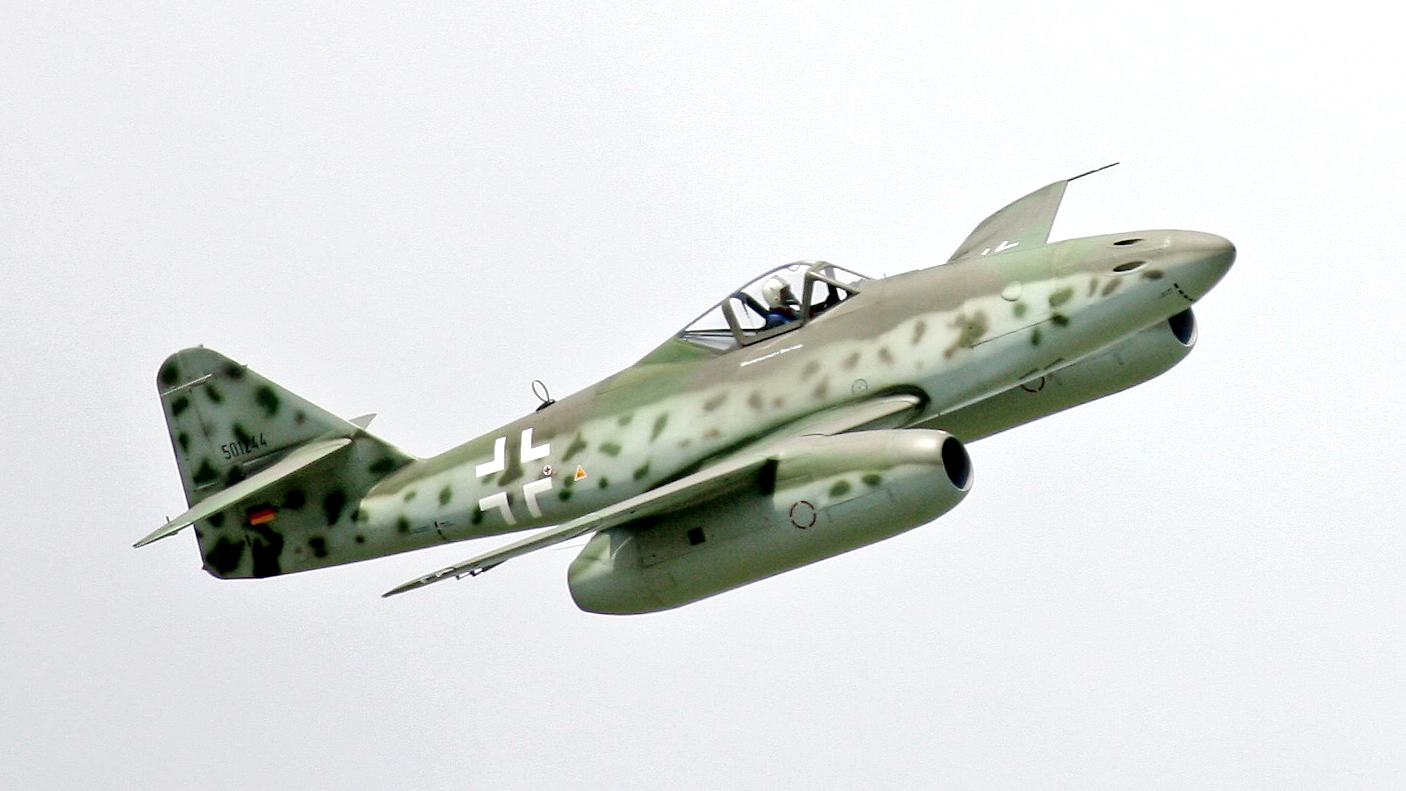
Me 262 (A-1c) replica of (A1-a), Berlin Air Show, 2006

In January 2003, the American Me 262 Project, based in Everett, Washington, completed flight testing to allow the delivery of partially updated spec reproductions of several versions of the Me 262 including at least two B-1c two-seater variants, one A-1c single-seater and two "convertibles" that could be switched between the A-1c and B-1c configurations. All are powered by General Electric CJ610 engines and feature additional safety features, such as upgraded brakes and strengthened landing gear. The "c" suffix refers to the new CJ610 powerplant and has been informally assigned with the approval of the Messerschmitt Foundation in Germany (the Werknummer of the reproductions picked up where the last wartime produced Me 262 left off – a continuous airframe serial number run with a near 60-year production break).

Flight testing of the first newly manufactured Me 262 A-1c (single-seat) variant (Werknummer 501244) was completed in August 2005. The first of these machines (Werknummer 501241) went to a private owner in the southwestern United States, while the second (Werknummer 501244) was delivered to the Messerschmitt Foundation at Manching, Germany. This aircraft conducted a private test flight in late April 2006 and made its public debut in May at the ILA 2006. The new Me 262 flew during the public flight demonstrations. Me 262 Werknummer 501241 was delivered to the Collings Foundation as White 1 of JG 7; this aircraft offered ride-along flights starting in 2008. The third replica, a non-flyable Me 262 A-1c, was delivered to the Evergreen Aviation & Space Museum in May 2010.

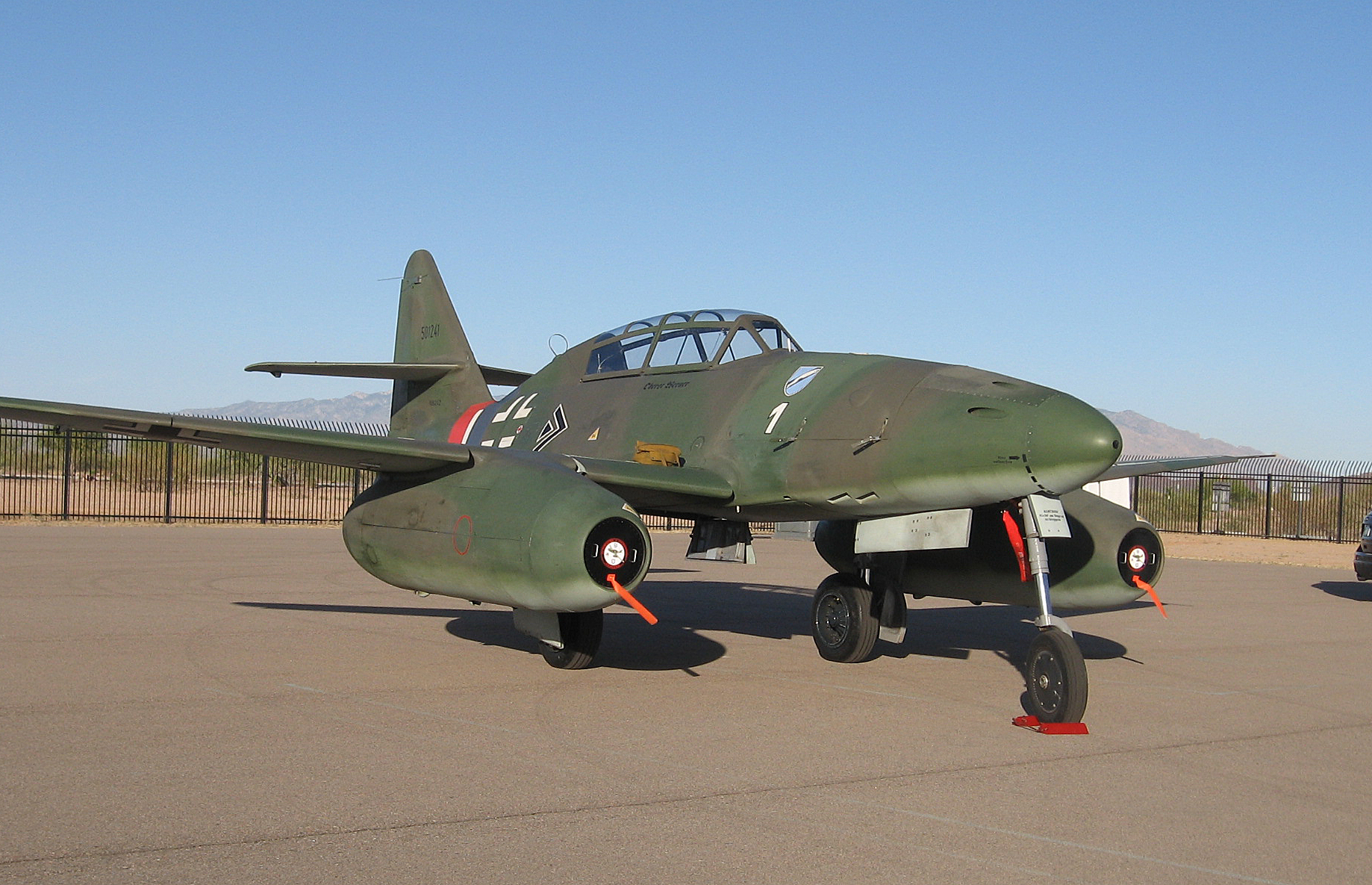
Collings Foundation's replica Me 262 B-1a, Marana, Arizona., 2013

== Variants ==
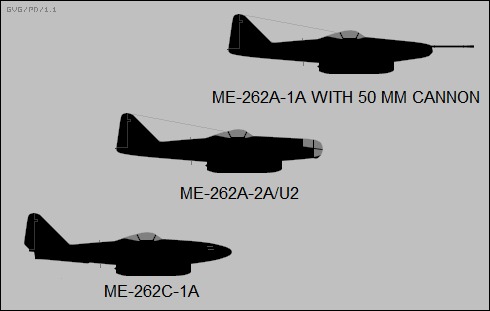
Me 262 variants

Note:- U = Umrüst-Bausatz – conversion kit installed at factory level, denoted as a suffix in the form /Un.

Me 262 A-0
Pre-production aircraft fitted with two Jumo 004B turbojet engines, 23 built.
Me 262 A-1a "Schwalbe"
Primary production version, usable as both fighter (interceptor) and fighter-bomber.
Me 262 A-1a/U1
Single prototype with a total of six nose mounted guns, two 20 mm (0.787 in) MG 151/20 cannon, two 30 mm (1.181 in) MK 103 cannon, and two 30 mm (1.181 in) MK 108 cannon.
Me 262 A-1a/U2
Single prototype with FuG 220 Lichtenstein SN-2 90 MHz radar transceiver and Hirschgeweih (stag's antlers) antenna array, for trials as a night-fighter.
Me 262 A-1a/U3
Reconnaissance version modified in small numbers, with Rb 20/30 cameras mounted in the nose or alternatively one Rb 20/20 and one Rb 75/30 (Rb – Reihenbildner – series-picture, topographic camera). Some retained one 30 mm (1.181 in) MK 108 cannon, but most were unarmed. Some fitted with 2 vertically mounted Rb 50/30 cameras.
Me 262 A-1a/U4
Bomber destroyer version, two prototypes with an adapted 50 mm (1.969 in) MK 214 (intended armament) or BK 5 (test ordnance only) anti-tank gun in the nose.
Me 262 A-1a/U5
Heavy jet fighter with six 30 mm (1.181 in) MK 108 cannon in the nose.
Me 262 A-1b
Trio of A-1a evaluation versions, starting with Werknummer 170 078, re-engined with two BMW 003A turbojets in place of the Jumo 004s, maximum speed 800 km/h (500 mph; 430 kn).
Me 262 A-2a "Sturmvogel"
Definitive bomber version retaining only the two lower 30 mm (1.181 in) MK 108 cannon.
Me 262 A-2a/U1
Single prototype with advanced bombsight.
Me 262 A-2a/U2
Two prototypes with glazed nose for accommodating a bombardier.
Me 262 A-3a
Proposed ground-attack version.
Me 262 A-4a
Reconnaissance version.
Me 262 A-5a
Definitive reconnaissance version used in small numbers at end of the war.
Me 262 B-1a
Two-seat trainer.
Me 262 B-1a/U1
Me 262 B-1a trainers converted into provisional night fighters, FuG 218 Neptun radar, with Hirschgeweih (eng:antler) eight-dipole antenna array.. Max speed reduced by 33Kts compared to the fighter.
Me 262 B-2
Proposed night fighter version with stretched fuselage.
Me 262C
Proposed development prototypes in four differing designs, meant to augment or replace the Jumo 004 jets with liquid-fueled rocket propulsion, as the "Home Protector" (Heimatschützer) series.
Me 262 C-1a
Single prototype [made from Me 262A Werknummer 130 186] of rocket-boosted interceptor (Heimatschützer I) with Walter HWK 109-509 liquid-fuelled rocket in the tail, first flown with combined jet/rocket power on 27 February 1945.
Me 262 C-2b
Single prototype [made from Me 262A Werknummer 170 074] of rocket-boosted interceptor (Heimatschützer II) with two BMW 003R "combined" powerplants (BMW 003 turbojet, with a single 9.8 kN (2,200 lbf) thrust BMW 109-718 liquid-fuelled rocket engine mounted atop the rear of each jet exhaust) for boosted thrust, only flown once with combined jet/rocket power on 26 March 1945.
Me 262 C-3
Heimatschützer III – proposed version with Jumo 004 turbojet engines replaced with Walter HWK RII-211 Liquid-fuelled rocket engines.
Me 262 C-3a
Heimatschützer IV – a rocket-boosted interceptor with a Walter HWK 109-509S-2 rocket motor housed in a permanent belly pack. Prototypes and initial production aircraft were captured before completion.
Me 262 D-1
Proposed variant to carry Jagdfaust mortars.
Me 262 E-1
Proposed variant based on A-1a/U4 with a 50 mm (1.969 in) MK 114 cannon.
Me 262 E-2
Proposed rocket-armed variant carrying up to 48 × R4M rockets.
Me 262 HG-I
"Hohe Geschwindigkeit" or "High Speed" variant, modified A-1a with new "racing" style cockpit and additional pieces were added to wing roots at the front.
Me 262 HG-II
Second "High Speed" variant, more heavily modified A-1a with "racing" style cockpit and wings swept at 35-degree angle and engine nacelles were moved closer to fuselage. A new butterfly V-shaped tail was tested but was too unstable in wind tunnel tests, so normal tail was kept.
Me 262 HG-III
Proposed Third "High Speed" variant, only progressed to wind tunnel model stage. This was the last and the pinnacle of the Me 262 aerodynamical possibility, which would have been built from the ground up as a new Me 262 instead of modifying older ones. In the Me 262 HG-III, its wings were swept at 45 degrees, it also had the "racing" style cockpit, but the largest change was the moving of the engine nacelles right into the fuselage side and changing the engines to the more powerful Heinkel HeS 011 engines.
Me 262 S
Zero-series model for Me 262 A-1a
Me 262 W-1
Provisional designation for Me 262 with 2x 2.7 kN (610 lbf) Argus As 014 pulse jet engines
Me 262 W-3
Provisional designation for Me 262 with 2x 4.90 kN (1,102 lbf) "square-intake" Argus As 044 pulse jet engines
Me 262 Lorin
Provisional designation for Me 262 with 2x Lorin ramjet booster engines in "over-wing" mounts, one above each of the Jumo turbojet nacelles.

=== Rüstsätze (field modification kits) ===
Rüstsätze may be applied to various sub-types of their respective aircraft type, denoted as a suffix in the form "/Rn".

- R1: Underfuselage pylon for 500 L (110.0 imp gal; 132.1 US gal) external fuel tank.
- R2: Ratog installation for two Rheinmetall 109-502 solid rocket engines.
- R3: BMW 003R rocket boosted turbojet installation.
- R4: Installation of the FuG 350 Zc Naxos radar warning receiver/detector.
- R5: The standard four 30 mm MK 108 cannon installation.
- R6: JagdBomber ("Jabo") equipment, such as bombsights and bomb racks.
- R7: Underwing installation of twelve R4M rockets carried on wooden racks.
- R8: R110BS Air to air rocket installation.
- R9: Ruhrstahl Ru 344 X-4 air-to-air missile installation.

=== Postwar variants ===
Avia S-92
Czech-built Me 262 A-1a (fighter)
Avia CS-92
Czech-built Me 262 B-1a (fighter trainer, two seats)

=== Reproductions ===
A series of reproductions was constructed by American company Legend Flyers (later Me 262 Project) of Everett, Washington. The Jumo 004 engines of the original are replaced by more reliable General Electric CJ610 engines. The first Me 262 reproduction (a two-seater) took off for the first time in December 2002 and the second one in August 2005. This one was delivered to the Messerschmitt Foundation and was presented at the ILA airshow in 2006.

A-1c: American privately built, based on A-1a configuration.
B-1c: American privately built, based on B-1a configuration.
A/B-1c: American privately built, convertible between A-1c and B-1c configuration.

== Operators ==
- (Nazi Germany) Luftwaffe
- (Czechoslovakia) Czechoslovak Air Force (postwar, nine S-92 and three CS-92)

== Surviving aircraft ==
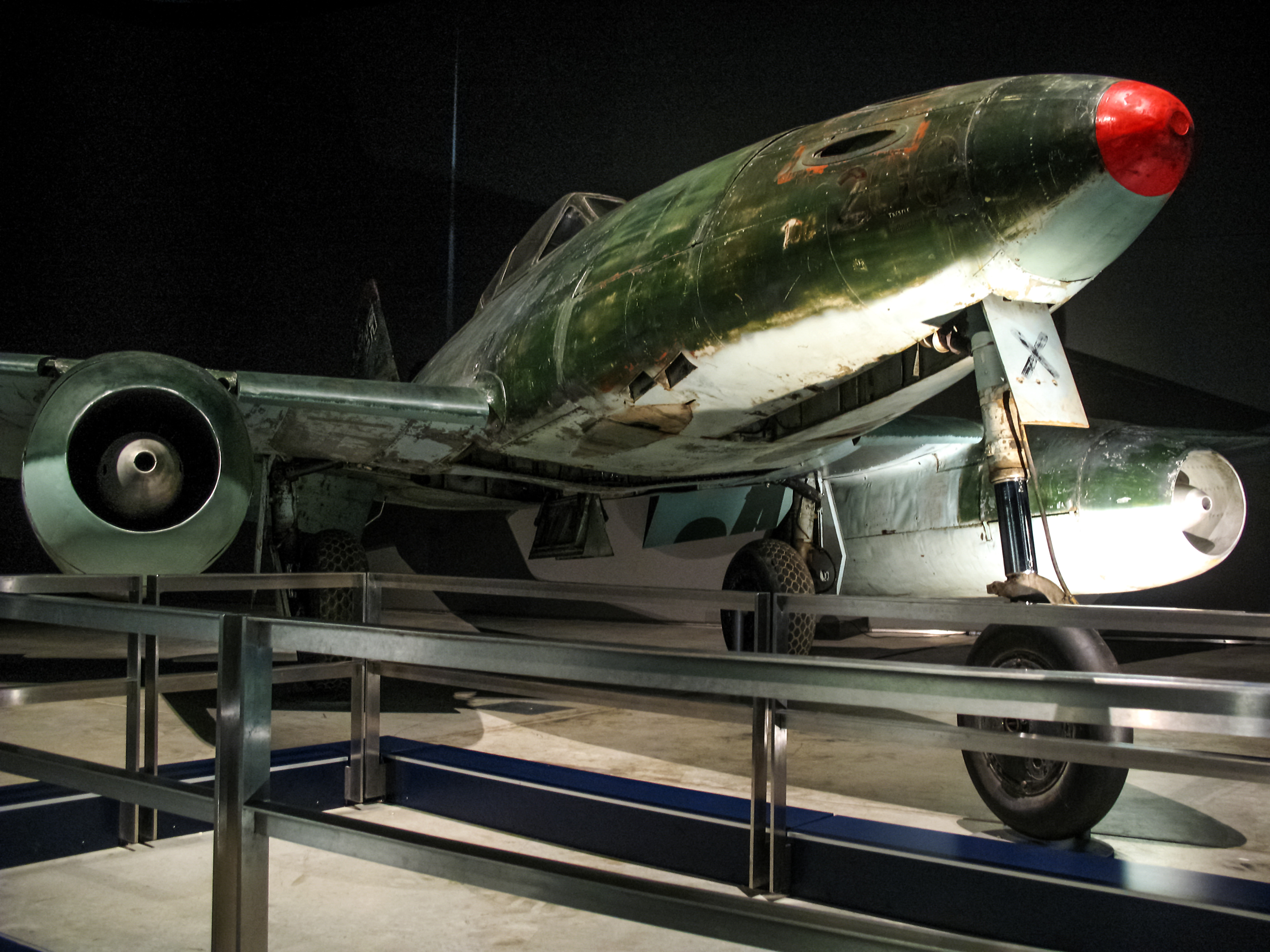
Me 262A-2a (Black X), Australia, 2012

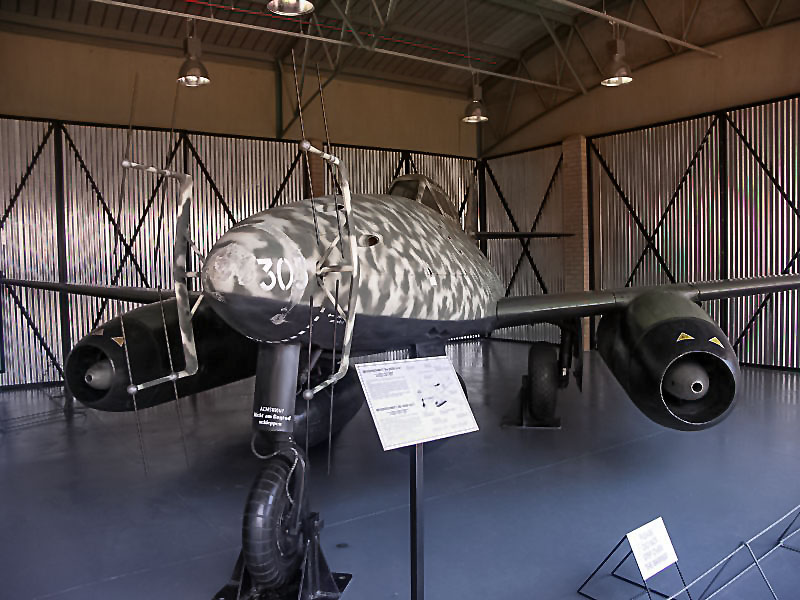
Me 262B-1a/U1 (Red 8), South Africa, 2008

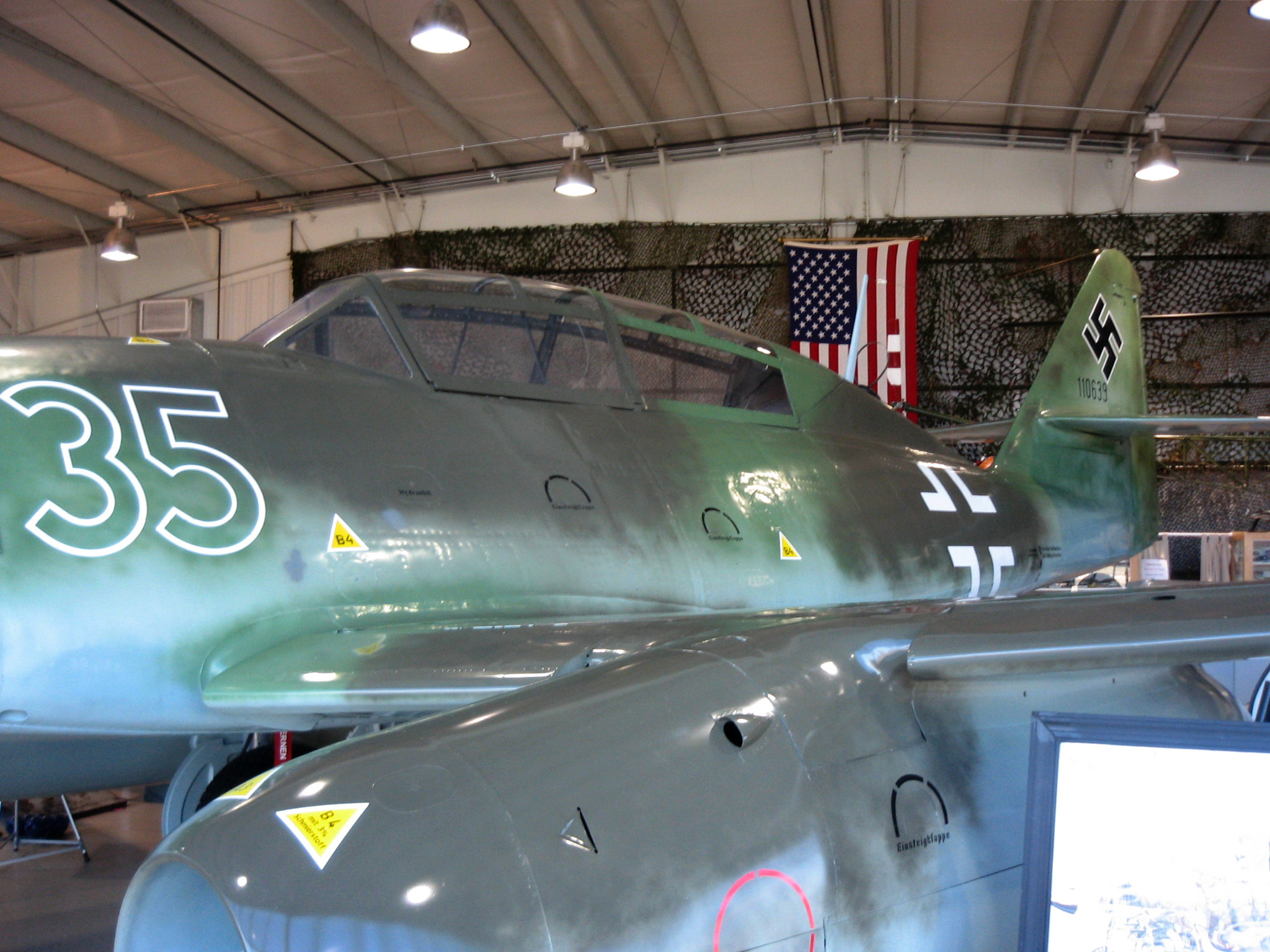
Me 262 B-1a (White 35), at Willow Grove, Pa., in 2007; relocated to and on display in Pensacola, Florida

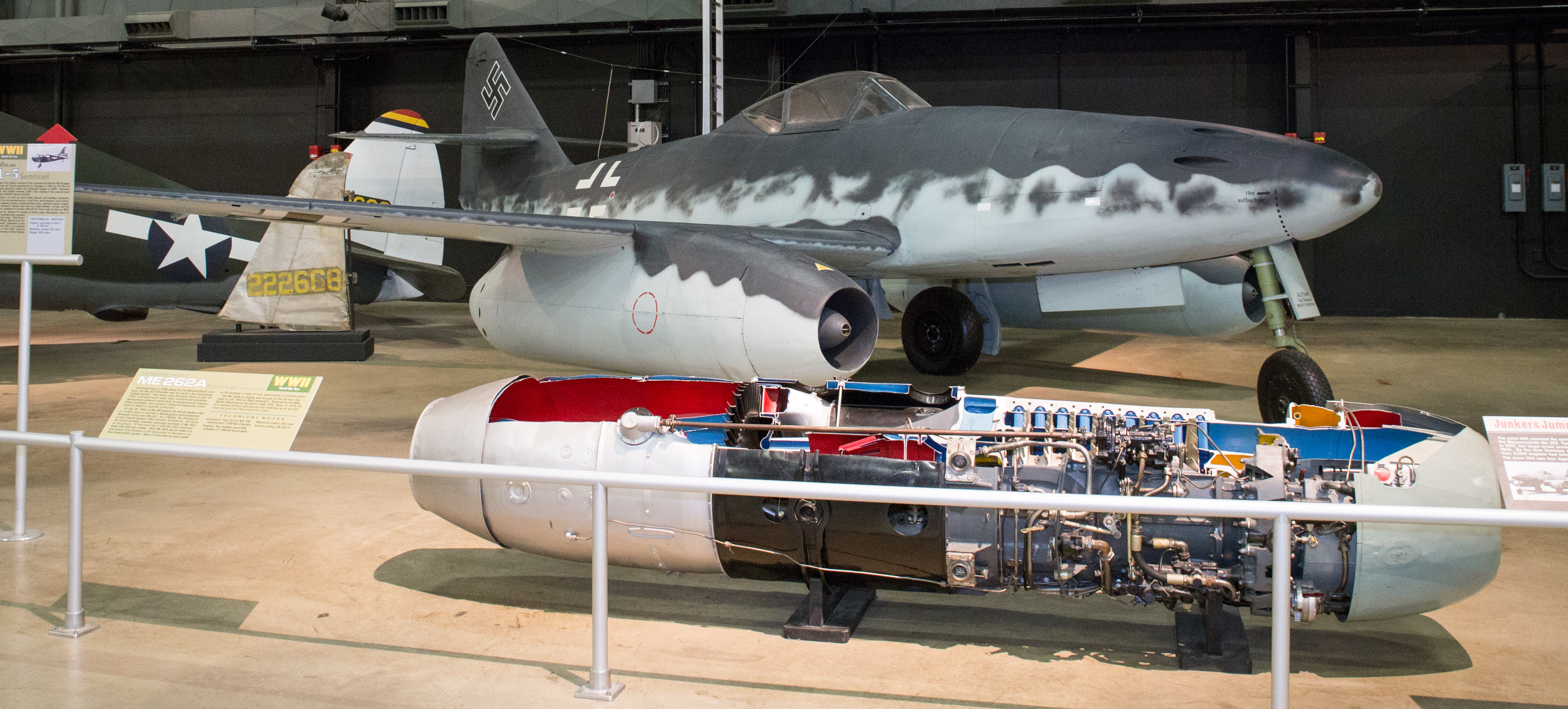
Me 262A and its Junkers Jumo 004 turbojet engine (Yellow 5), NMUSAF-Dayton, 2007

Me 262 A-1a/R7, W.Nr.500071 White 3, III./JG 7
Deutsches Museum, Munich, Germany. This aircraft, flown by Hans Guido Mutke while a pilot of 9. Staffel/JG 7, was confiscated by Swiss authorities on 25 April 1945 after Mutke made an emergency landing in Switzerland due to lack of fuel.
Me 262 A-1a
Reconstructed from parts of crashed and incomplete Me 262s. Luftwaffenmuseum der Bundeswehr, Germany.
Me 262 A-1a W.Nr.501232 Yellow 5, 3./KG(J)6
National Museum of the United States Air Force, Wright-Patterson Air Force Base, Dayton, Ohio, US.
Me 262 A-1a/U3 W.Nr.500453
Flying Heritage Collection, Everett, Washington, United States, currently undergoing restoration to flying condition. It is intended to fly using its original Jumo 004 engines. The aircraft was bought from the Planes of Fame Air Museum, Chino, California.
Me 262 A-1a/R7 W.Nr.500491 Yellow 7, II./JG 7
National Air and Space Museum, Washington, D.C., United States. Possesses twin original underwing racks for 24 R4M unguided rockets. Flown by Oberfeldwebel Heinz Arnold
Me 262 A-1a W.Nr.112372
Royal Air Force Museum Cosford RAF Cosford, United Kingdom.
Me 262 A-2a W.Nr.500200 Black X 9K+XK, 2 Staffel./KG 51
Australian War Memorial, Canberra, Australia. Built at Regensburg in March 1945, same batch from which the Deutsches Museum White 3 was built. Flown by Fahnenjunker Oberfeldwebel Fröhlich and surrendered at Fassberg. It is the only Me 262 left in original colours. Its markings show both the unit signatures along with the Air Ministry colours applied at RAE Farnborough, where it was allocated reference Air Min 81. Restoration was completed in 1985 and the aircraft was put up on display.
Me 262 B-1a/U1, W.Nr.110305 Red 8
South African National Museum of Military History, Johannesburg, South Africa.
Me 262 B-1a, W.Nr.110639 White 35
National Museum of Naval Aviation, Pensacola, Florida, US
Avia S-92
Prague Aviation Museum, Kbely, Prague, Czech Republic.
Avia CS-92
Prague Aviation Museum, Kbely, Prague, Czech Republic.

== Specifications (Messerschmitt Me 262 A-1a) ==
3-view drawing of the Me 262

Data from Quest for Performance. Original Messerschmitt documents

General characteristics

- Crew: 1
- Length: 10.6 m (34 ft 9 in)
- Wingspan: 12.6 m (41 ft 4 in)
- Height: 3.5 m (11 ft 6 in)
- Wing area: 21.7 m^{2} (234 sq ft)
- Aspect ratio: 7.32
- Empty weight: 3,795 kg (8,367 lb)
- Gross weight: 6,473 kg (14,271 lb)
- Max takeoff weight: 7,130 kg (15,719 lb)
- Powerplant: 2 × Junkers Jumo 004B-1 axial-flow turbojet engines, 8.8 kN (1,980 lbf) thrust each

Performance

- Maximum speed: 900 km/h (560 mph, 490 kn)
- Range: 1,050 km (650 mi, 570 nmi)
- Service ceiling: 11,450 m (37,570 ft)
- Rate of climb: 20 m/s (3,900 ft/min) at max weight of 7,130 kg (15,720 lb)
- Wing loading: 300 kg/m^{2} (61 lb/sq ft)
- Thrust/weight: 0.28

Armament

- Guns: 4 × 30 mm MK 108 cannon
- Rockets: 24 × 55 mm (2.2 in) R4M rockets
- Bombs: 2 × 250 kg (550 lb) bombs

== See also ==
Aircraft of comparable role, configuration, and era

- Bell P-59 Airacomet
- Gloster Meteor
- Heinkel He 280
- Lockheed P-80 Shooting Star
- Messerschmitt P.1099
- Nakajima Ki-201
- Nakajima Kikka
- Sukhoi Su-9 (1946)

Related lists

- List of aircraft of World War II
- List of fighter aircraft
- List of jet aircraft of World War II

Others

- Wunderwaffe
- Focke-Wulf Ta 283
