= Messerschmitt P.1099 =

German fighter prototype

Me P.1099
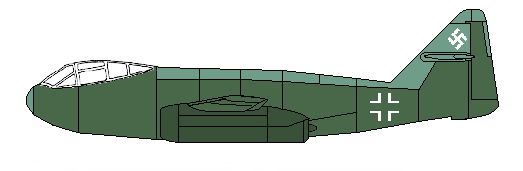

General information
- Type: Multirole fighter
- Manufacturer: Messerschmitt
- Status: Project terminated owing to end of war
- Primary user: Luftwaffe
- Number built: None completed

History
- Developed from: Messerschmitt Me 262
- Developed into: Messerschmitt P.1110

The Messerschmitt P.1099 was a two-seat prototype jet aircraft developed by Messerschmitt for the Luftwaffe before the end of the Second World War.

== History ==
The design of the Me P.1099 began in the summer of 1943 and was intended as an improvement to the Messerschmitt Me 262. The Me P.1099 was planned in a way which could later be developed into high-speed bomber (Schnellbomber), reconnaissance plane, interceptor, night fighter and trainer versions.

The Messerschmitt P.1099 was a 12 m long, conventional-looking aircraft with a wingspan of 12.6 m. It had a wider fuselage than the Messerschmitt Me 262 and was equipped with a cockpit for two pilots, located at the front end. The planned powerplants were two Junkers Jumo 004 turbojet engines, later to be replaced by Heinkel HeS 011 turbojets in a further development with swept wings, the Messerschmitt P.1100. None of the variants was built, but this project was developed into the Messerschmitt P.1100 all-weather fighter project, which in turn would lead to the single-seat, single-jet Messerschmitt P.1101 design for the Emergency Fighter Program in July 1944.

== Variants ==
The Messerschmitt P.1099 project had different versions of two-seat fighters which retained the tail and the wing design of the Me 262. All of the projected aircraft variants would be powered by two Junkers Jumo 004 turbojets.

=== Messerschmitt Me P.1099A ===
Jet-powered fighter with a crew of two, developed in January 1944. It retained the wings and the tail section of the Me 262A-2a, but with a wider fuselage. There were three planned versions, differing in armament: Version A with four MK 108 30 mm cannon. Version B with two MK 103 30 mm cannon and Version C with two MK 108 and two MK 103 cannon in the nose.

=== Messerschmitt Me P.1099B ===
A heavily armed variant, developed from the Me 262, of which two versions were foreseen: Version A would be armed with a MK 108 cannon and a MK 112 55 mm cannon. Version B was armed with a MK 114 50 mm cannon. The radio equipment would be a FuG 16, Peil G6, FuG 101 radio altimeter, FuBl 2 blind landing equipment, as well as the FuG 25a Erstling identification friend or foe transceiver. There was also a night fighter version equipped with two upward-firing MK 108 cannons.

== See also ==
- List of German aircraft projects, 1939–45
