= Eastern Continental Trail =

Long-distance hiking trail in the United States and Canada

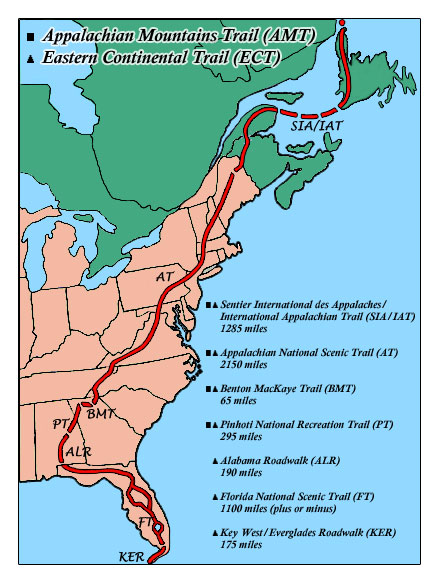
- Route of the Eastern Continental Trail through the eastern United States and Canada
- Length: 4,400 mi (7,100 km)
- Location: Eastern United States and Canada
- Trailheads: Key West, Florida; Belle Isle (Newfoundland and Labrador)
- Use: Hiking
- Highest point: 6,643 ft (2,025 m), Kuwohi
- Lowest point: Key West, Florida
- Difficulty: Easy to strenuous
- Season: Summer in northern sections, year round in southernmost sections
- Sights: Appalachian Mountains; Everglades; Florida Keys; Gaspé Peninsula; Hudson Valley; Lake Okeechobee; Mount Katahdin; Springer Mountain; Amicalola Falls State Park; Kuwohi; McAfee Knob
- Hazards: Alligators, American black bears, fire ants, limited water, tick-borne diseases, poison ivy, severe weather, steep grades, venomous snakes

The Eastern Continental Trail (ECT) is a network of hiking trails in the United States and Canada, reaching from Key West, Florida to Belle Isle, Newfoundland and Labrador.

== Description ==
The hiking distance of the ECT is approximately 4,400 miles (7,100 km), not including water gaps around Newfoundland. The trail system was named by long-distance hiker M. J. Eberhart (trail name: Nimblewill Nomad). The first person to complete the ECT from Key West to Cap Gaspé, Quebec, was John Brinda in 1997.

From south to north, the route strings together the Florida Keys Overseas Heritage Trail (a rail trail that is partially complete as of early 2022), the Florida Trail, a road walk through southern Alabama, the Pinhoti National Recreation Trail, and part of the Benton MacKaye Trail, to reach the southern terminus of the Appalachian Trail at Springer Mountain, Georgia. The ECT includes the entire Appalachian Trail to Mount Katahdin, Maine, then continues on the International Appalachian Trail through Maine, New Brunswick, and Quebec. The hiking trail ends at the Gulf of St. Lawrence; the hiker can then travel to Newfoundland by other means and complete the next section of the ECT across that island. After another water gap, the ECT reaches its symbolic end at Belle Isle off the northern end of Newfoundland's Great Northern Peninsula.

== Components ==
From south to north, these are the established trails that have been incorporated into the ECT:

- Florida Keys Overseas Heritage Trail (under development)
- Florida Trail
- Pinhoti Trail
- Benton MacKaye Trail
- Appalachian Trail
- International Appalachian Trail

== Trail Records ==
In 1997, John Brinda became the first person and man to complete the ECT.

In 2023, LoLo "Sparkle" Veloz became the first woman to thru-hike the Eastern Continental Trail. Veloz is also the first known queer person and Mexican immigrant to complete the trail.
