= List of shipwrecks in September 1870 =

The list of shipwrecks in September 1870 includes ships sunk, foundered, grounded, or otherwise lost during September 1870.

== 1 September ==
List of shipwrecks: 1 September 1870
Ship	State	Description
Dashing Wave	United Kingdom	The ship was wrecked on a reef. Her crew were rescued. She was on a voyage from Foochowfoo, China to Sydney, New South Wales.
Dove	United Kingdom	The schooner ran aground on the Arklow Bank, in the Irish Sea off the coast of County Wicklow and sank. All six people on board were rescued by the Arklow Lifeboat. She was on a voyage from Morecambe, Lancashire to Newport, Monmouthshire.
John Middleton	United Kingdom	The steamship sank in the North Sea. Her crew were rescued by the schooner John (Norway). John Middleton was on a voyage from Kronstadt to Leith, Lothian.
Riga Packet	United Kingdom	The barque was driven ashore and wrecked at Höganäs, Sweden. She was on a voyage from Brest, Finistère, France to Riga, Russia.
Swiftsure	United Kingdom	The ship departed from Leith for New York, United States. No further trace, presumed foundered with the loss of all hands.

== 2 September ==
List of shipwrecks: 2 September 1870
Ship	State	Description
Amalia	Norway	The ship was wrecked on Spitsbergen.
Ann	United Kingdom	The ship ran aground at Kronstadt, Russia. She was on a voyage from Middlesbrough, Yorkshire to Kronstadt. Ann was refloated on 6 September.
Annie Fossitt	United Kingdom	The ship was driven ashore at Arkhangelsk, Russia.
Bon Accord	United Kingdom	The paddle tug collided with the brig Vivid (United Kingdom) off Sunderland, County Durham. She was towed in to Sunderland, where she sank.
Djigschin	Russia	The ship was wrecked at Arkhangelsk. Her crew were rescued.
Edward Stodard	United Kingdom	The ship ran aground at Kronstadt. She was on a voyage from Newcastle upon Tyne, Northumberland to Kronstadt. She was refloated on 9 September.
Harvester	United Kingdom	The ship was driven ashore and wrecked 120 nautical miles (220 km) west of Aden. Her crew survived, but the ship was plundered by the local inhabitants. She was on a voyage from Aden to Muscat, Muscat and Oman.
Isabella	United Kingdom	The ship ran aground on the Vogelsand. She was on a voyage from Newcastle upon Tyne, Northumberland to Amsterdam, North Holland, Netherlands. She was refloated and taken in to the Nieuw Diep.
Magellanes	Spain	The ship was damaged by fire at Antwerp, Belgium.
Northampton	United Kingdom	The ship ran aground in the Yangtze. She was on a voyage from Woosung, China to London. She was refloated on 5 September and put back to Woosung.
Sleipner	Norway	The ship was wrecked on Novaya Zemlya, Russia.
Timandra	United Kingdom	The ship was driven ashore on Moshchny Island, Russia. She was on a voyage from Glasgow, Renfrewshire to Kronstadt, Russia.
Wave	United Kingdom	The schooner was severely damaged by fire at.

== 3 September ==
List of shipwrecks: 3 September 1870
Ship	State	Description
Antje	Netherlands	The ship was driven ashore and wrecked on Saaremaa, Russia. She was on a voyage from Newcastle upon Tyne, Northumberland, United Kingdom to Saint Petersburg.
Apolina	United Kingdom	The ship sank off Fårö, Sweden. She was on a voyage from Hartlepool, County Durham to Stockholm, Sweden.
Cingalese	United Kingdom	The ship was driven ashore and wrecked at Greenisland, County Antrim. She was on a voyage from the Clyde to Quebec City, Canada. She was refloated in late September and taken in to Quebec City for repairs.
Providence	United Kingdom	The fishing boat capsized off the Farne Islands, Northumberland with the loss of a crew member.
Swiftsure	United Kingdom	The ship departed from Leith, Lothian for New York, United States. No further trace, presumed foundered with the loss of all 21 people on board.
Valetta	United Kingdom	The barque was wrecked north of the mouth of the Rio Grande. She was on a voyage from Liverpool, Lancashire to Montevideo, Uruguay.
Vigilant	United Kingdom	The ship was driven ashore and wrecked at Blakeney, Norfolk. Her crew were rescued. She was on a voyage from Sunderland, County Durham to Trieste.

== 4 September ==
List of shipwrecks: 4 September 1870
Ship	State	Description
Arima	United Kingdom	The ship departed from Havana, Cuba for a British port. No further trace, presumed foundered with the loss of all hands.
Clytenmestra	United Kingdom	The ship was wrecked on a reef in the Indian Ocean off Rodrigues. She was on a voyage from Rangoon, Burma to Queenstown, County Cork.
HMS Dart	Royal Navy	The Philomel-class gunvessel was driven ashore at Charlottetown, Prince Edward Island, Canada.
Eolus	France	The ship foundered. She was on a voyage from Marseille, Bouches-du-Rhône to Matanzas, Cuba.
Fruiter	New South Wales	The ship ran aground on a reef off Pine Island and sank with the loss of four lives. she was on a voyage from Sydney to New Caledonia.
John and Jane	United Kingdom	The schooner ran aground on the Shipwash Sand, in the North Sea off the coast of Suffolk and sank. Her crew took to the boats; they were rescued the next day. She was on a voyage from Rochester, Kent to Aberdeen.
Margaret Deane	United Kingdom	The ship was destroyed by fire in the Atlantic Ocean. Her crew were rescued by Emily (United Kingdom). Margaret Deane was on a voyage from Bahia, Brazil to Liverpool, Lancashire.
Restauracão	Portugal	The ship ran aground off Pernambuco, Brazil. She was on a voyage from Pernambuco to London, United Kingdom. She was refloated and put back to Pernambuco in a leaky condition.
Susanna	Prussia	The ship collided with another Alpha (Norway) and foundered off Helsingør, Denmark. She was on a voyage from Burntisland, Fife, United Kingdom to Copenhagen, Denmark.

== 5 September ==
List of shipwrecks: 5 September 1870
Ship	State	Description
Alpine Craig	United Kingdom	The ship struck a rock and foundered off Tralee, County Kerry. Her crew were rescued.
Caroline	United States	The barque was wrecked in the Sea of Okhotsk. Her crew were rescued.
Galatea	United Kingdom	The ship was driven ashore north of Howth, County Dublin.
Ida	United States	The barque was wrecked in the Sea of Okhotsk. Her crew were rescued.
Juana	Spain	The ship caught fire off Pointe de Grave, Gironde and was scuttled. She was on a voyage from Bordeaux, Gironde to Havana, Cuba.
Sara Juliana	Denmark	The ship was driven ashore on the east coast of Öland, Sweden. She was on a voyage from Newcastle upon Tyne, Northumberland, United Kingdom to Stockholm, Sweden.
HMS Teazer	Royal Navy	The Beacon-class gunboat collided with Oriana (United Kingdom) at Colombo, Ceylon and was damaged. She put back to Colombo.
Thomas	United Kingdom	The schooner was driven ashore at West Hartlepool, County Durham. She was on a voyage from Blakeney, Norfolk to West Hartlepool. She was refloated with assistance from a tug.
Therese Rose	France	The brig sprang a leak and foundered. Her crew were rescued by Ocean (United Kingdom).
HMS Trinculo	Royal Navy	The Britomart-class gunboat collided with the steamship Moratin (Spain) off Estepona, Spain, and sank with the loss of two of her crew.

== 6 September ==
List of shipwrecks: 6 September 1870
Ship	State	Description
HMS Captain	Royal Navy	HMS Captain The masted turret ship capsized and sank in a gale in the Atlantic Ocean off Cape Finisterre, Spain, with the loss of approximately 480 lives. There were 27 survivors.
Teviot	United Kingdom	The ship was severely damaged by fire at the West India Docks, London.

== 7 September ==
List of shipwrecks: 7 September 1870
Ship	State	Description
Caradoc	United Kingdom	The steamship ran aground on the South Scarp Sand, in the River Tees. She was on a voyage from Bilbao, Spain to Middlesbrough, Yorkshire. SHe was refloated and towed in to Middlesbrough.
Ellen	United Kingdom	The ship ran aground at Heligoland. She was on a voyage from a Scottish port to Hamburg. She was refloated with the assistance of a steamship.
Hermann	Flag unknown	The barque was abandoned in the Atlantic Ocean. Her crew were rescued by a schooner. They were landed at Halifax, Nova Scotia, Canada, where Hermann was brought in two days later by an American fishing vessel. Several holes had been bored in her bottom. Her captain committed suicide and her crew were arrested. They admitted attempting to scuttle the ship as an insurance fraud.
Ianthe	United Kingdom	The ship foundered. Her crew were rescued by the steamship Becton (United Kingdom).
Janet Wignall	United Kingdom	The ship ran aground at Strangford, County Antrim. She was on a voyage from Glasgow, Renfrewshire to Gloucester.
Madras	United Kingdom	The barque departed from Calcutta, India for Liverpool, Lancashire. No further trace, presumed foundered with the loss of all hands.
Wild Wave	United Kingdom	The ship was driven ashore and wrecked on St. Paul Island, Nova Scotia. Her crew were rescued. She was on a voyage from Quebec City to Swansea.

== 8 September ==
List of shipwrecks: 8 September 1870
Ship	State	Description
Bertha	United Kingdom	The ship was wrecked on "Claptrap Beach". She was on a voyage from the River Mersey to Melbourne, Victoria.
James Russell	United Kingdom	The ship was abandoned in the Atlantic Ocean in a sinking condition. Eight of her crew were reported missing. Eleven survivors were rescued by Fairy (United Kingdom). James Russell was on a voyage from Akyab, Burma to Queenstown, County Cork.
Jane	United Kingdom	The schooner foundered at Lowestoft, Suffolk. Her crew were rescued. She was on a voyage from Hartlepool, County Durham to London.
Moneguash	United Kingdom	The barque was driven ashore at Tangier, Nova Scotia, Canada. She was on a voyage from Liverpool, Lancashire to Halifax, Nova Scotia.
Perkins	United Kingdom	The brigantine collided with the Yorkshire Billyboy Lilly (United Kingdom) off Aldeburgh, Suffolk. Perkins capsized and sank; her crew were rescued. She was on a voyage from Leith, Lothian to London.
Prudence	United Kingdom	The ship was driven ashore and sank at Clevedon, Somerset. Her crew were rescued. She was on a voyage from Newport, Monmouthshire to Bristol, Gloucestershire.
Raven	United Kingdom	The brig foundered in the North Sea off Tynemouth Castle, Northumberland with the loss of all but two of her crew. The survivors were rescued by Fortuna (Denmark). Raven was on a voyage from Sunderland, County Durham to Kronstadt.
Surinam	United Kingdom	The ship sank off Frangerola, Spain. Her crew were rescued. She was on a voyage from Palamós, Spain to Newcastle upon Tyne, Northumberland.

== 9 September ==
List of shipwrecks: 9 September 1870
Ship	State	Description
Alnwick Castle	United Kingdom	The schooner foundered in Jura Sound.
Amelia	United Kingdom	The smack was run into by the schooner G. F. Williams (United Kingdom) and was consequently run ashore in the Mulroy Water, where she was wrecked. Her crew survived. She was on a voyage from Greenock, Renfrewshire to Rathmelton, County Donegal.
Amity	United Kingdom	The ship was abandoned at sea. Her crew survived. She was on a voyage from Lough Swilly to Bowmore, Islay, Inner Hebrides.
Ceres	United Kingdom	The schooner was driven ashore and sank at Mullaghmore, County Sligo. Her crew were rescued. She was on a voyage from Glasgow, Renfrewshire to Galway.
Chilian	United Kingdom	The ship was driven ashore and wrecked at "Muslick", Pembrokeshire. Her crew were rescued.
Eliza	United Kingdom	The schooner was driven ashore at Lighthouse Point, County Antrim. She was on a voyage from Ardrossan, Ayrshire to Belfast, County Antrim.
Elizabeth	United Kingdom	The smack was driven ashore and wrecked at Larne, County Antrim.
Garibaldi	United Kingdom	The brig was driven ashore at Annan, Dumfriesshire.
Hannah and Mary	United Kingdom	The smack was wrecked on the Black Rocks, off Campbeltown, Argyllshire. Her crew survived. She was on a voyage from Troon, Ayrshire to Newry, County Antrim.
Harmony	United Kingdom	The schooner was driven ashore at Lighthouse point. She was on a voyage from Ardrossan to Belfast.
Isabella	United Kingdom	The ship ran aground on McKinney's Bank, in the Irish Sea. She was on a voyage from Troon to Londonderry.
Liberty	United Kingdom	The brig was driven ashore at Varberg, Grand Duchy of Finland. She was on a voyage from Hartlepool, County Durham to Riga, Russia.
Margaret	United Kingdom	The ship was wrecked on Lunga, Slate Islands.
Meteor	United Kingdom	The schooner was driven ashore on Arranmore, County Donegal. She was on a voyage from Clifton to Barrow-in-Furness, Lancashire.
Minorca	United Kingdom	The brig was wrecked near Cape Bon, Beylik of Tunis. She was on a voyage from Nicolaieff, Russia to a British port.
Ruby	United Kingdom	The lighter sank off Ardbeg, Islay.
St. Mungo	United Kingdom	The brig was driven ashore on Holy Isle, in the Firth of Clyde. She was on a voyage from Ardrossan, Ayrshire to Dublin. She was refloated with assistance from the tug Flying Huntsman (United Kingdom) and towed in to Lamlash, Isle of Arran.
Unrivalled	United Kingdom	The ship was abandoned in the Mediterranean Sea. Her crew were rescued by Flying Venus (United Kingdom). Unrivalled was on a voyage from Singapore, Straits Settlements to London.
Wynarius Bodewas	Netherlands	The ship sank in the Baltic Sea off Hogland, Russia. Her crew were rescued.
919	Russia	The lighter was destroyed by fire at Kronstadt and was scuttled with the loss of six lives.
Unnamed	United Kingdom	The lighter foundered off Ardbeg, Islay. Her crew were rescued.
Unnamed	United Kingdom	The sloop sank in the River Mersey.

== 10 September ==
List of shipwrecks: 10 September 1870
Ship	State	Description
Adria	Canada	The schooner was driven ashore at Shelburne, Nova Scotia.
Ajax	United Kingdom	The fishing trawler foundered in the North Sea with the loss of all hands.
Caroline	United Kingdom	The schooner was wrecked near Burtonport, County Donegal with the loss of her captain. She was on a voyage from Kilkerran, County Galway to Glasgow, Renfrewshire.
Etha Rickmers	United States	The ship was wrecked on the Goodwin Sands, Kent, United Kingdom with the loss of all hands. She was on a voyage from New York to Rotterdam, South Holland, Netherlands.
Henriette	Bremen	The ship ran agroundd on the Meyersoledge. She was on a voyage from Bahia, Brazil to Bremen. She was later refloated.
Sterling	United Kingdom	The ship departed from Fortress Monroe, Virginia, United States for a British port. No further trace, presumed foundered with the loss of all hands.
Surate	France	The ship was driven ashore at Cambois, Northumberland, United Kingdom. She was on a voyage from Oran, Algeria to the River Tyne. She was refloated on 12 September and towed in to Berwick upon Tweed, Northumberland.
Unnamed	United Kingdom	The schooner was driven ashore at Powfoot, Dunbartonshire.

== 11 September ==
List of shipwrecks: 11 September 1870
Ship	State	Description
Ad Valorem	Canada	The ship was wrecked on the Thrump Cap Shoal.
Agapimeni Adelphi	Greece	The brig ran aground on the Kaloot Sand. She was on a voyage from Antwerp, Belgium to Swansea, Glamorgan, United Kingdom.
Ellen Vale	United Kingdom	The ship ran aground in the Garavogue River and was damaged. She was on a voyage from Miramichi, New Brunswick, Canada to Ballina, County Mayo. She was refloated and taken in to Sligo in a severely leaky condition.
Sophie	United Kingdom	The schooner was driven ashore at Berwick upon Tweed, Northumberland. She was on a voyage from Sunderland, County Durham to Aberdeen. She was refloated and towed in to Berwick upon Tweed in a waterlogged condition.
Tamaulipas	United Kingdom	The steamship was driven ashore at Llanbadrig, Anglesey. She was on a voyage from Liverpool, Lancashire to Bordeaux, Gironde. Her passengers were taken off. She was refloated and put back for Liverpool but had to be beached at Beaumaris, Anglesey.
Unnamed	France	The ship was driven ashore at Newbiggin-by-the-Sea, Northumberland.
Five unnamed vessels	Flags unknown	The ships were driven ashore near "Egg Island", Nova Scotia, Canada.
Unnamed	Flag unknown	The brig ran aground on Tommy's Ledges, off "Goose Island", Nova Scotia.

== 12 September ==
List of shipwrecks: 12 September 1870
Ship	State	Description
Annie Smith	United Kingdom	The schooner was driven ashore west of Malin Head, County Donegal. She was on a voyage from Glasgow, Renfrewshire to Ballyshannon, County Donegal.
Bee	United Kingdom	The ship was driven ashore at Lytham St. Annes, Lancashire. She was on a voyage from Preston, Lancashire to Glasgow.
Civiare	United Kingdom	The ship was driven ashore at Kirkcudbright. She was on a voyage from Glenarm, County Antrim to Workington, Cumberland.
David and Jessie	Victoria	The ship was driven ashore and wrecked at Colombo, Ceylon.
Elizabeth and Jan	United Kingdom	The lugger was wrecked on Coll, Inner Hebrides. Her crew were rescued. She was on a voyage from Killala, County Louth to Glasgow.
Flora	United Kingdom	The smack was driven ashore at Moville, County Donegal.
Hottinger	United Kingdom	The brig was wrecked on Neckmansgrund, in the Baltic Sea. Her crew were rescued. She was on a voyage from Grimsby, Lincolnshire to Kronstadt, Russia.
Isabella	United Kingdom	The schooner was driven ashore at Whiting Bay, Isle of Arran. She was refloated and towed to Lamlash, where she was driven ashore and wrecked. Her crew were rescued. She was on a voyage from Londonderry to Ardrossan, Ayrshire.
James	United Kingdom	The ship sprang a leak and sank at Lowestoft, Suffolk. She was on a voyage from Hartlepool, County Durham to London.
Janet	United Kingdom	The smack was abandoned by her crew. She was subsequently boarded by some fishermen who ran her ashore at Cushendall, County Antrim.
Janet Hunter	United Kingdom	The schooner was driven ashore west of Malin Head. She was on a voyage from Glasgow to Ballyshannon, County Antrim. She was refloated on 20 September and towed in to Lough Swilly.
John	United Kingdom	The brig was abandoned in the La Teignouse Channel. She was on a voyage from Bilbao, Spain to a British port.
Mary Ann	United Kingdom	The schooner was driven ashore at Dundalk, County Louth.
Mary Jolly	United Kingdom	The ship was driven ashore at Copenhagen, Denmark. She was on a voyage from Newport, Monmouthshire to Copenhagen. She was refloated.
Nathaniel	Norway	The barque capsized in the Atlantic Ocean with the loss of four of her twelve crew. Survivors were rescued on 20 September by Boreas (United Kingdom). Nathaniel was on a voyage from Quebec City, Canada to Hartlepool, County Durham, United Kingdom.
Pericles	United Kingdom	The ship capsized and sank off the coast of the Newfoundland Colony with the loss of six of her crew. She was on a voyage from Quebec City, Canada to Greenock, Renfrewshire.
R. H. Knight	United Kingdom	The collier was driven ashore at Clontarf, County Dublin.
Volante	United Kingdom	The barque was driven ashore and wrecked on "Innisdoway", off Tory Island, County Donegal. She was on a voyage from Saint John, New Brunswick, Canada to Londonderry.
Walker	United Kingdom	The smack was run down and sunk off the mouth of the Humber by Argo (United Kingdom) with the loss of a crew member. Survivors were rescued by Argo.

== 13 September ==
List of shipwrecks: 13 September 1870
Ship	State	Description
Alnwick Castle	United Kingdom	The schooner foundered in the Sound of Jura. She was on a voyage from Glasgow, Renfrewshire to Crinan, Argyllshire.
Conciliateur	France	The ship was wrecked at Newhaven, Sussex, United Kingdom. She was on a voyage from Middlesbrough, Yorkshire, United Kingdom to Saint-Malo, Ille-et-Vilaine.
Ellen	Sweden	The ship was driven ashore and wrecked near Lemvig, Denmark. Her crew were rescued. She was on a voyage from Hartlepool, County Durham, United Kingdom to Thisted, Denmark.
Favourite	United Kingdom	The brig was run into by the steamship Viatka (United Kingdom) and sank 1.5 nautical miles (2.8 km) south west by south of the Swin Middle Lightship ( Trinity House). Her crew were rescued. She was on a voyage from Sunderland, County Durham to London.
Galatea	United States	The steamship sprang a leak and foundered off the Bahamas. Her crew took to two boats. Those in one of the boats were rescued by the schooner Tampico (United States). She was on a voyage from Port-au-Prince, Haiti to Boston, Massachusetts.
Hecuba	United Kingdom	The full-rigged ship struck a sunken rock and sank 5 nautical miles (9.3 km) off Northumberland Point, Cape Colony. Her crew were rescued by the steamship Good Hope ( (United Kingdom of Great Britain and Ireland) Cape Colony). Hecuba was on a voyage from Calcutta, India to New York.
Hercules	Netherlands	The ship ran aground in the Zuyder Zee off the coast of Overijssel. She was on a voyage from Amsterdam, North Holland to Riga, Russia.
Holtinger	Flag unknown	The brig was wrecked near Reval, Russia. Her crew were rescued. She was on a voyage from Grimsby, Lincolnshire, United Kingdom to Kronstadt, Russia.
Maria Johanna	United Kingdom	The ship was wrecked on M'Kinney's Bank. Her crew were rescued.
Truine	United Kingdom	The ship was abandoned at sea. She was on a voyage from Taganrog, Russia to Rotterdam, South Holland, Netherlands. She was subsequently taken in to the Nieuw Diep.

== 14 September ==
List of shipwrecks: 14 September 1870
Ship	State	Description
Britannia	United Kingdom	The ship departed from Leith, Lothian for New York, United States. No further trace, presumed foundered with the loss of all hands.
Erato	United Kingdom	The ship foundered in the South Atlantic.
Johannes	Hamburg	Franco-Prussian War: The ship, a prize, was captured off Heligoland. She had been on a voyage from Sunderland, County Durham, United Kingdom to Hamburg. She was beached at Cuxhaven. She was later refloated and taken to Heligoland.
Kate	New Zealand	The 46-ton ketch was inundated when it stuck on the bar of the Catlins River, New Zealand.

== 15 September ==
List of shipwrecks: 15 September 1870
Ship	State	Description
Alliance	United Kingdom	The ship was driven ashore at Margate, Kent. She was on a voyage from Newcastle upon Tyne, Northumberland to Margate.
Bosphorus	United Kingdom	The steamship ran aground at Kastrup, Denmark. She was on a voyage from Kronstadt, Russia to an English port. She was refloated. She was refloated and resumed her voyage.
Carley	United Kingdom	The sloop was destroyed by fire at Hartlepool, County Durham.
Harmony	United Kingdom	The brig was wrecked at Egmond aan Zee, North Holland, Netherlands with the loss of all ten crew.
Jane	United Kingdom	The ship was wrecked in Gart Creek. She was on a voyage from Sligo to Cardiff, Glamorgan.
Maid of Moray	United Kingdom	The ship was wrecked in the Small Isles, Argyllshire. She was on a voyage from Liverpool, Lancashire to Cap Gaspé, Quebec, Canada.
Sarah Jane	United Kingdom	The ship was destroyed by fire in the Atlantic Ocean.

== 16 September ==
List of shipwrecks: 16 September 1870
Ship	State	Description
Eliza	United Kingdom	The ship ran aground at Berwick upon Tweed, Northumberland. She was on a voyage from South Shields, County Durham to Aberdeen. She was refloated.
Pelion	United Kingdom	The brig sank in the North Sea. Her nine crew survived. She was on a voyage from Sunderland to the Nieuw Diep.
Trafalgar	United Kingdom	The schooner foundered in Liverpool Bay.
Unnamed	United Kingdom	The Mersey Flat sank at Bootle, Lancashire.

== 17 September ==
List of shipwrecks: 17 September 1870
Ship	State	Description
Conquistador	Spain	The barque caught fire and was abandoned at in the Indian Ocean (38°29′S 75°45′E). Her crew were rescued by the barque Menam (United Kingdom). Conquistadorwas on a voyage from Dénia to Manila, Spanish East Indies.
Enterprise	United Kingdom	The steamship ran aground at Dundalk, County Louth.
Glencairn	United Kingdom	The ship was driven ashore near Castletown, Isle of Man. Her crew were rescued. Glencairn was on a voyage from Liverpool, Lancashire to Quebec City, Province of Canada, Canada. She was dismantle in situ.
Selina	United Kingdom	The schooner was driven ashore near "Somma", Sweden. She was on a voyage from Hartlepool, County Durham to "Somma".
Star	United Kingdom	The barque was driven ashore on Læsø, Denmark. Her crew were rescued. She was on a voyage from Montrose, Forfarshire to Kronstadt. Russia.

== 18 September ==
List of shipwrecks: 18 September 1870
Ship	State	Description
Æolus	Bremen	The brig foundered. Her crew were rescued by Dorothy (United Kingdom). Æolus was on a voyage from Mexico to Bremen.
Anne Kirstine	United Kingdom	The schooner was run down and sunk by the steamship James Southern (United Kingdom) at Great Yarmouth, Norfolk. Her crew were rescued by James Southern. Anne Kirstine was on a voyage from King's Lynn, Norfolk to London and/or Chichester, Sussex.
Comte Roger	France	The barque was driven ashore and wrecked at Lemvig, Norway.
Dale	United Kingdom	The barque was driven ashore and wrecked at Lemvig. Her eleven crew survived. She was on a voyage from Newcastle upon Tyne, Northumberland to Kronstadt, Russia.
Day Star	United States	The schooner was sunk while doing in-shore Mackerel fishing off Gloucester, Massachusetts in a gale. All 12 crewmen killed.
Madras	United Kingdom	The ship departed from Calcutta, India for Liverpool, Lancashire. No further trace, presumed foundered with the loss of all hands.
W. H. Haselden	United Kingdom	The ship was sighted in the Atlantic Ocean whilst on a voyage from Montreal, Quebec, Canada to Glasgow, Renfrewshire. No further trace, presumed foundered with the loss of all hands.

== 19 September ==
List of shipwrecks: 19 September 1870
Ship	State	Description
Blackwood	United Kingdom	The brig collided with the barque Sandy Hook (United States) and sank off Cape Spartel, Morocco. Her crew were rescued by Sandy Hook.
Bonny Belle	United Kingdom	The ship foundered in the Atlantic Ocean 40 nautical miles (74 km) south of Porto, Portugal. Her crew were rescued. She was on a voyage from Marseille, Bouches-du-Rhône, France to Falmouth, Cornwall.
City of Sydney	United Kingdom	The ship was sighted in the South Atlantic whilst on a voyage from London to Sydney, New South Wales. No further trace, presumed foundered with the loss of all hands.
Unrivalled	United Kingdom	The ship was abandoned off the Cape of Good Hope, Cape Colony. Her crew were rescued.

== 20 September ==
List of shipwrecks: 20 September 1870
Ship	State	Description
Arthur	United States	The barque was destroyed by fire at Boston, Massachusetts.
Eliza and Alice	United Kingdom	The barque was wrecked at Humansdorp, Cape Colony. Her crew were rescued. She was on a voyage from Sundsvall, Sweden to Algoa Bay.
Louise Jewett	(United Kingdom of Great Britain and Ireland) Jersey	The ship caught fire 20 nautical miles (37 km) off Matervilles Point, Cuba. Her crew were rescued by Parendon Grande (Spanish Navy). Louise Jewett was on a voyage from Ardrossan, Ayrshire to Matanzas, Cuba.
Malabar	United Kingdom	The ship caught fire in the Atlantic Ocean (26°00′S 31°17′W) and was abandoned by her crew. The wreck was still afloat at 29°57′S 9°38′E on 9 August 1871.
Navaosta	United States	The barque was severely damaged by fire at Boston.
Ratcliffe	United Kingdom	The barque foundered in the Atlantic Ocean with the loss of three of her crew Survivors were rescued on 25 September by Emigrant (United Kingdom). Ratcliffe was on a voyage from Quebec City, Canada to South Shields, County Durham.
St Cloud	United States	The barque was destroyed by fire at Boston.
Tynemouth Castle	United Kingdom	The steamship was driven ashore at Cape Sestos, Ottoman Empire. She was on a voyage from Odesa, Russia to a British port. She was refloated with assistance.
Warren White	United Kingdom	The ship was wrecked in Chincoteague Bay. She was on a voyage from Saint John's, Newfoundland Colony to Havana, Cuba.

== 21 September ==
List of shipwrecks: 21 September 1870
Ship	State	Description
Copernicus	United Kingdom	The steamship ran aground at Liverpool, Lancashire. She was on a voyage from a port in Brazil to Liverpool. She was refloated with the assistance of three tugs.
Edmund Ironsides	United Kingdom	The steamship was driven ashore at Breaksea Point, Glamorgan. She was on a voyage from Cork to Gloucester. She was refloated and resumed her voyage.
Madras	United Kingdom	The ship departed from Calcutta, India for Liverpool. No further trace, presumed foundered with the loss of all hands.
Rachel	United Kingdom	The fishing coble was run down and sunk at Staithes, Yorkshire by the steamship Thames with the loss of all three crew.
Scinde	United Kingdom	The ship departed from Demerara, British Guiana for Havana, Cuba. No further trace, presumed foundered with the loss of all hands.
Sturt	New Zealand	The 104-ton paddle steamer became a wreck after stranding on the bar at Kaiapoi, New Zealand.

== 22 September ==
List of shipwrecks: 22 September 1870
Ship	State	Description
Architect	Flag unknown	The ship ran aground and capsized 4 nautical miles (7.4 km) south west of Bird Island. Her crew were rescued on 29 September by the barque Russia (United Kingdom). Architect was on a voyage from Quebec City, Canada to Antwerp, Belgium.

== 23 September ==
List of shipwrecks: 23 September 1870
Ship	State	Description
Antonia	France	The ship was wrecked on "Penguin Island". She was on a voyage from Bordeaux, Gironde to Valparaíso, Chile.
Claymore	French Navy	Franco-Prussian War: The gunboat ran aground in the Seine at Sèvres, Hauts-de-Seine and came under attack by the Prussians. She managed to manoeuvre into position and repel the attack.
Hermance	France	The schooner was driven ashore on the Île d'Oléron, Charente-Inférieure. She was on a voyage from Havre de Grâce, Seine-Inférieure to Bordeaux, Gironde.
Margaret	United Kingdom	The ship was wrecked on the Madonna Rock, off Paxo, Greece. She was on a voyage from Corfu to Patras, Greece.
Mois de Mai	Italy	The ship sprang a leak and sank in the Atlantic Ocean. Her crew were rescued. She was on a voyage from Italy to Swansea, Glamorgan, United Kingdom.
Ville de Aigues-Mortes	France	The ship ran aground on the Mudge Bank, south west of Zanzibar.
Unnamed	Flag unknown	The steamship struck the Horn's Reef and sank off Fanø, Denmark.

== 24 September ==
List of shipwrecks: 24 September 1870
Ship	State	Description
Alice Thompson	United Kingdom	The barque was wrecked at Swatow, China. She was on a voyage from Keelung, Formosa to Shanghai, China.
Hong Kong	Spain	The schooner was wrecked in Manila Bay. She was on a voyage from Sual to Manila, Spanish East Indies.
North American	United Kingdom	The steamship ran aground at Montreal, Quebec, Canada. She was on a voyage from Liverpool, Lancashire to Montreal.
Orchidee	France	The brigantine collided with the steamship May Queen (United Kingdom) and sank in the North Sea off Huntcliffe Foot, Yorkshire, United Kingdom. Her crew were rescued. She was on a voyage from Middlesbrough, Yorkshire to Cardiff, Glamorgan, United Kingdom.
Sultan	Hong Kong	The steamship was wrecked in Manila Bay. She was on a voyage from Hong Kong to Borneo. She was subsequently towed in to Manila, Spanish East Indies by Petunia United Kingdom.
William and Mary	United Kingdom	The ship sprang a leak and foundered 8 nautical miles (15 km) off Porthdinllaen, Caernarfonshire. Her crew were rescued. She was on a voyage from Runcorn, Cheshire to "Edeyrn".

== 25 September ==
List of shipwrecks: 25 September 1870
Ship	State	Description
Bessie Harris	United Kingdom	The ship caught fire at Port Said, Egypt and sank. She was on a voyage from Cardiff, Glamorgan to Port Said.
Carl Petter	(Russian Empire) Grand Duchy of Finland	The ship ran aground at Lisbon, Portugal and was beached at the Belém Tower in a severely damaged condition. She was on a voyage from Oulu to Lisbon.
Marion	United Kingdom	The ship struck a rock at Galle, Ceylon. She was beached and wrecked. Her crew were rescued.

== 26 September ==
List of shipwrecks: 26 September 1870
Ship	State	Description
Mary Iddow	United Kingdom	The schooner ran aground on the Selmar Rock and was wrecked. Her crew were rescued. She was on a voyage from Liverpool, Lancashire to Ravenglass, Cumberland.

== 27 September ==
List of shipwrecks: 27 September 1870
Ship	State	Description
Argentine Emma	Norway	The steamship ran aground on the Tacli Rocks, in the Black Sea. She was on a voyage from Cardiff, Glamorgan, United Kingdom to Taganrog, Russia. She was refloated and taken in to Kertch, Russia for repairs.
Alert	United Kingdom	The ship departed from Saint John's, Newfoundland Colony for Havana, Cuba. No further trace, presumed foundered with the loss of all hands.
Cinque Ports	United Kingdom	The schooner sank off Rye, Sussex.
Mauritius	United Kingdom	The steamship was holed in the River Liffey and sank at the stern. She was on a voyage from Rotterdam, South Holland to Dublin.

== 28 September ==
List of shipwrecks: 28 September 1870
Ship	State	Description
Evadne	United Kingdom	The ship departed from Arkhangelsk, Russia for London. No further trace, presumed foundered with the loss of all hands.
HMS Lapwing	Royal Navy	The Plover-class gunvessel ran aground off Port Hood, Nova Scotia, Canada. Subsequently refloated, repaired and returned to service.

== 29 September ==
List of shipwrecks: 29 September 1870
Ship	State	Description
Continental	United States	The steamship foundered 30 nautical miles (56 km) off Cabo San Lucas, Mexico with the loss of eight lives. She was on a voyage from Mazatlán, Mexico to San Francisco, California.
Prince	United Kingdom	The steamship was driven ashore at Theddlethorpe, Lincolnshire. She was on a voyage from Dunkirk, Nord to Hull, Yorkshire. She was refloated in early October and taken in to Hull.
Prospero	United Kingdom	The steamship ran aground at Souter Point, Northumberland. She was on a voyage from Grimsby, Lincolnshire to the River Tyne. She was refloated and taken in to South Shields, County Durham.
Seth	Austria-Hungary	The barque ran aground on the Cromwell Rocks, in the River Suir. She was on a voyage from Waterford to Cardiff, Glamorgan, United Kingdom. She was refloated and resumed her voyage.
Undaunted	New South Wales	The ship ran aground at the mouth of the Manning River.

== 30 September ==
List of shipwrecks: 30 September 1870
Ship	State	Description
Caradoc	United Kingdom	The steamship foundered off Ouessant, Finistère, France. Her crew reached Ouessand in their boats. She was on a voyage from Bilbao, Spain to Middlesbrough, Yorkshire.
Clara	United Kingdom	The brig ran aground and was wrecked at Calshot, Hampshire. Her crew survived. She was on a voyage from Newport, Monmouthshire to Southampton, Hampshire.
Desio	Italy	The barque was wrecked near "Sciatella".
Galene	Hamburg	The ship was driven ashore in Algoa Bay.
Hopewell	United Kingdom	The sloop struck the Horse Rock, in Ramsey Sound and sank. Her crew were rescued. She was on a voyage from Milford Haven, Pembrokeshire to Cardigan.
Marmion	United Kingdom	The steam flat ran aground on the Hoyle Bank, in Liverpool Bay.
Moskowa	Flag unknown	The ship ran aground on the Ortiz Bank.
Neptune	United Kingdom	The Gosport Ferry, a steam launch, foundered off Portsea, Hampshire. She was on a voyage from Portsmouth to Gosport.
Nieves Martinez	Chile	The ship was abandoned in the Pacific Ocean. Her crew were rescued by Pacifique (France). Nieves Martinez was on a voyage from Port Gamble, Washington Territory to Valparaíso.
Wanderer	United Kingdom	The brigantine ran aground on the Long Rock, off Ballywalter, County Antrim. She was on a voyage from Sligo to Whitehaven, Cumberland. She was refloated and towed in to Belfast, County Antrim in a leaky condition.

== Unknown date ==
List of shipwrecks: Unknown date in September 1870
Ship	State	Description
Agnes	United Kingdom	The ship ran aground. She was on a voyage from Syros to Athens, Greece. She was refloated and put back to Syros in a severely leaky condition.
Agnes Fraser	Canada	The ship was lost in the Gut of Canso. She was on a voyage from Pictou, Nova Scotia to Boston, Massachusetts, United States.
Alberdina	Bremen	The ship sank at Copenhagen, Denmark. She was on a voyage from Bremen to Riga, Russia.
Alexander Anderson	United Kingdom	The ship was wrecked on the Ankerground, in the Baltic Sea. She was on a voyage from Saint Petersburg, Russia to Riga.
Alexandria	United Kingdom	The tug was driven ashore and severely damaged at Moville, County Donegal. She was refloated and taken in to Londonderry.
Alice Wilcox	United Kingdom	The ship ran aground on the Nore.
Alto	United States	The whaler was wrecked in the Falkland Islands.
Berbice	United Kingdom	The ship was driven ashore at "the Shillies". She was refloated.
Camilla	France	The steamship sank in the North Sea. She was on a voyage from Pontrieux, Côtes-du-Nord to a Norwegian port.
Canada	United Kingdom	The ship ran aground near Helsingborg, Sweden. She was on a voyage from the Nieuw Diep to "Swartbrick". She was refloated with assistance.
Caroline Martin	United Kingdom	The ship was abandoned in Lough Foyle. Her crew were rescued by a lifeboat.
Charles Small	United Kingdom	The ship ran aground on the Droogden. She was on a voyage from Newcastle upon Tyne, Northumberland to Sunderland, County Durham. She was refloated and taken in to Copenhagen for repairs.
Condor	Hamburg	The ship ran aground near Batavia, Netherlands East Indies and was damaged. She was on a voyage from Singapore, Straits Settlements to Hamburg. She was refloated and put in to Batavia.
Coquette	United Kingdom	The ship ran aground at Yeşilköy, Ottoman Empire. She was on a voyage from Hartlepool, County Durham to Odesa, Russia.
Dauntless	United States	The schooner was lost on the way to the Bay of St. Lawrence. Lost with all 12 hands.
Delaware	United States	The ship was abandoned in the Atlantic Ocean. She was on a voyage from Baltimore, Maryland to Demerara, British Guiana.
Desiah	United States	The ship was abandoned in the Atlantic Ocean. She was on a voyage from Philadelphia, Pennsylvania to Antwerp, Belgium.
Dragon	United States	The ship was lost whilst on a voyage from New York to Barbados.
Eagle	United States	The ship was damaged by fire. She was on a voyage from New York to Galveston, Texas.
Elbrandine	Bremen	The ship collided with Neptune ( Danzig) and sank in the Baltic Sea. She was on a voyage from Bremen to Libava, Courland Governorate.
Elizabeth	United Kingdom	The ship was driven ashore in Lake St. Peter. She was on a voyage from Montreal, Quebec, Canada to London.
Elizabeth Annie	United Kingdom	The ship was wrecked in the Bay of Bulls before 16 September.
Elmdale	United Kingdom	The ship was driven ashore near Sligo. She was on a voyage from Miramichi, New Brunswick, Canada to Sligo.
Ellen	United Kingdom	The ship was driven ashore at Twillingate, Newfoundland Colony before 16 September.
Ellora	United Kingdom	The ship was wrecked on the coast of Nova Scotia. She was on a voyage from Baltimore, Maryland, United States to Liverpool, Lancashire.
Emma Ash	United Kingdom	The steamship ran aground near Copenhagen. She was on a voyage from Kronstadt, Russia to Hull, Yorkshire. She was refloated and resumed her voyage.
Emma Harkins	United Kingdom	The ship was lost in the Gulf of Finland. She was on a voyage from Antwerp, Belgium to Råneå, Sweden.
Era	United Kingdom	The ship was wrecked off Old Calabar, Africa.
Esmerelda	United Kingdom	The ship foundered in the Atlantic Ocean 100 nautical miles (190 km) off Savannah-la-Mar< Jamaica. Her crew survived. She was on a voyage from Curaçao, Curaçao and Dependencies to Liverpool.
Evergreen	(Canada)	The schooner collided with another vessel and sank off "Cariboo", Nova Scotia. She was on a voyage from Pictou to Wallace, Nova Scotia.
Exodus	United Kingdom	The ship was driven ashore at Portneuf, Quebec. Her crew were rescued. She was on a voyage from South Shields, County Durham to Quebec City, Canada.
Flora	United Kingdom	The ship was wrecked on East Caicos, Caicos Islands. She was on a voyage from Halifax, Nova Scotia to Jamaica.
Gomer de Castro	Flag unknown	The schooner ran aground on the Burbo Bank, in Liverpool Bay. She was on a voyage from Bahia, Brazil to Liverpool. She was refloated.
Gustav	Flag unknown	The ship capsized in the North Sea off Hanstholm, Denmark on or before 16 September.
Haidee	United Kingdom	The brigantine was wrecked on the Cobbler's Rocks. She was on a voyage from Demerara, British Guiana to Boston, Massachusetts.
Haldon	United Kingdom	The ship was wrecked on the Cobbler's Rocks. She was on a voyage from Demerara, British Guiana to Boston, Massachusetts, United States.
Halifax	Flag unknown	The ship was wrecked at Charleston, South Carolina, United States.
Happy Return	United Kingdom	The ship was driven ashore at Sambro, Nova Scotia.
H. A. Stephenson	United States	The ship was abandoned. She was on a voyage from Annapolis, Maryland to Montevideo, Uruguay.
Herzog	Flag unknown	The ship was wrecked at Liscomb, Nova Scotia. She was on a voyage from Belfast, County Antrim, United Kingdom to St. Mary's, United States.
Huntley Castle	United Kingdom	The ship was wrecked on the Macclesfield Bank before 22 September. She was on a voyage from Shanghai, China to London.
Ida	Flag unknown	The schooner was wrecked at Okhotsk, Russia.
Jacob Den Breems	Netherlands	The schooner ran aground at Hellevoetsluis, Zeeland, or Arkhangelsk, Russia. She was refloated.
Jenny	United Kingdom	The ship was driven ashore on the Dutch coast. She was on a voyage from Dram, Norway to Rotterdam, South Holland, Netherlands.
Jeune Aimee	France	The ship ran aground on the Salby Bank, off Teignmouth, Devon, United Kingdom. She was refloated on 16 September with the assistance of two steamships.
J. Morgan	Canada	The brigantine was driven ashore and wrecked at Spencer's Island, Nova Scotia.
Johanna Adriana	Netherlands	The koff sank at Bolderāja, Russia. She was on a voyage from Amsterdam to Bolderāja.
John Armstrong	(United Kingdom of Great Britain and Ireland) Leeward Islands	The ship ran aground on a reef off Barbuda. She was on a voyage from Saint Kitts to Greenock, Renfrewshire, United Kingdom. She was consequently condemned.
J. S. de Wolf	United Kingdom	The full-rigged ship was abandoned at sea. She was on a voyage from Liverpool to Philadelphia.
Juana Uriante	France	The ship caught fire at Pointe de Grave, Landes and was scuttled. She was on a voyage from Bordeaux, Gironde to Havana, Cuba.
Kate Winifred	United Kingdom	The ship was lost off the Celebes Islands. She was on a voyage from Zebu, Spanish East Indies to London.
Kragerø	Norway	The ship sank in the North Sea. She was on a voyage from Amsterdam, North Holland, Netherlands to a Baltic port.
Laura	United States	The brig capsized in the Atlantic Ocean. She was on a voyage from New York to Queenstown, County Cork, United Kingdom.
Lile	United Kingdom	The ship was driven ashore on "Papa Island". She was refloated with assistance and resumed her voyage.
Lisbonese	Portugal	The ship ran aground and was wrecked at Lisbon. Her crew were rescued. She was on a voyage from Cardiff, Glamorgan, United Kingdom to Lisbon.
Luck	United Kingdom	The ship was driven ashore and wrecked in the Gulf of Finland. Her crew were rescued. She was on a voyage from St. Davids, Pembrokeshire to Kronstadt.
Magnet	United Kingdom	The yacht was driven ashore and wrecked at Buncrana, County Donegal. Her crew were rescued.
Mars	United Kingdom	The tug foundered in the North Sea off the Dutch coast with the loss of all hands, nine or ten lives. Wreckage from the vessel came ashore at Ouddorp, South Holland.
Massaliok	France	The ship was lost in the Torres Strait.
Medora	United Kingdom	The ship was wrecked on Saaremaa. Her crew were rescued. She was on a voyage from Hartlepool to Kronstadt.
Michele and Anne	United Kingdom	The ship was abandoned at sea. She was on a voyage from Cayenne to Mauritius.
Monckton	United Kingdom	The ship was beached at New Ferry, Cheshire.
Nancy	United Kingdom	The ship foundered before 15 September with the presumed loss of all hands. She was on a voyage from Cow Bay to New York.
Nicolaus	Hamburg	Franco-Prussian War: The schooner, which had been captured by the French on 5 September, was wrecked on Düne, Heligoland. Her crew were rescued. She was on a voyage from the Rio Grande to Hamburg.
Petronella	Sweden	The schooner was wrecked at Holmstad, Norway. Her crew were rescued. She was on a voyage from Newcastle upon Tyne to Holmstad.
Prince Royal	(Canada)	The schooner sprang a leak on 4 September and was abandoned before 11 September. All on board were rescued. She was on a voyage from Amherst, Nova Scotia to Saint John, New Brunswick.
Rajagopaul	United Kingdom	The ship was wrecked on St. Paul Island, Nova Scotia, Canada. Her crew were rescued. She was on a voyage from Liverpool, Lancashire to Quebec City.
Rosinante	Paraguay	The ship was destroyed by fire at Humaitá.
Rover	United Kingdom	The barque was driven ashore at Appledore, Devon.
Rover	United Kingdom	The ship was wrecked on the Dutch coast. She was on a voyage from Sunderland to Amsterdam.
San Giovanni	Italy	The barque was driven ashore near "Malipoli", Ottoman Empire. She was on a voyage from Odesa, Russia to an English port.
S. Giacomo	Greece	The bombarda was driven ashore and wrecked on Makri in late September. Her crew were rescued.
Sharon	United Kingdom	The ship was wrecked at Charleston.
Sir Colin	United Kingdom	The ship was wrecked at Bowmore, Islay. She was on a voyage from Ballina, County Mayo to Troon, Ayrshire.
Soebloemsten	Sweden	The ship was driven ashore near Ronehamn, Gotland. She was on a voyage from London to Sundsvall.
Solid	Spain	The ship was lost whilst on a voyage from Aguadilla, Puerto Rico to Barcelona.
Star	United Kingdom	The ship was driven ashore at Montrose, Forfarshire. She was on a voyage from Montrose to Sunderland. She was refloated.
St. Mary	United Kingdom	The brig was abandoned in the Atlantic Ocean.
St. Petersburg	United Kingdom	The ship ran aground at "Swinebordene". She was on a voyage from Hull to Saint Petersburg.
Strathblane	United Kingdom	The ship was driven ashore un the "Barsigo River". She was on a voyage from Liverpool, Lancashire to Montreal She was later refloated.
St. Sauveur	France	The ship ran aground and sank off Billiton, Netherlands East Indies. Her crew were rescued. She was on a voyage from Saigon, French Indo-China to Mauritius.
Svedlund	Flag unknown	The ship was driven ashore and wrecked near "Homma". She was on a voyage from Hartlepool to "Louima".
Theresa Rose	United Kingdom	The ship foundered off the coast of Africa. She was on a voyage from Bana to Rochefort, Charente-Inférieure.
Therese	France	The ship foundered off the coast of Africa.
Tommasse Maria	France	The ship was wrecked on "Cervi Island". She was on a voyage from Odesa to Marseille, Bouches-du-Rhône.
Uhla	United Kingdom	The ship was driven ashore on Isle Madam, Nova Scotia before 16 September. She was on a voyage from Swansea, Glamorgan to Montreal. She was refloated in early October and taken in to Quebec City. She was consequently condemned.
Varuna	United Kingdom	The yacht was wrecked at St. Ives, Cornwall.
Verena	United Kingdom	The ship was wrecked in the Nun River. Her crew survived.
Vier Gezusters	Netherlands	The ship ran aground on the Zadelberg Shoal before 30 September. She was on a voyage from Cheribon to Surabaya, Netherlands East Indies.
Vittalia	Sweden	The ship was driven ashore at Hals, Denmark.
Voltigeur	United Kingdom	The ship was wrecked on Neckman's Ground, in the Baltic Sea. She was on a voyage from Grimsby, Lincolnshire to Kronstadt.
Unnamed	Flag unknown	The barque was driven ashore near Halifax before 14 September. She was on a voyage from Belfast to St. Mary's, Nova Scotia.
