= Forillon =

Forillon can have the following meanings:

- Forillon National Park, a national park in Quebec, Canada
- Forillon, original French name of the present Ferryland, Newfoundland and Labrador
