= International Appalachian Trail =

Long-distance hiking trail in Eastern United States and Canada

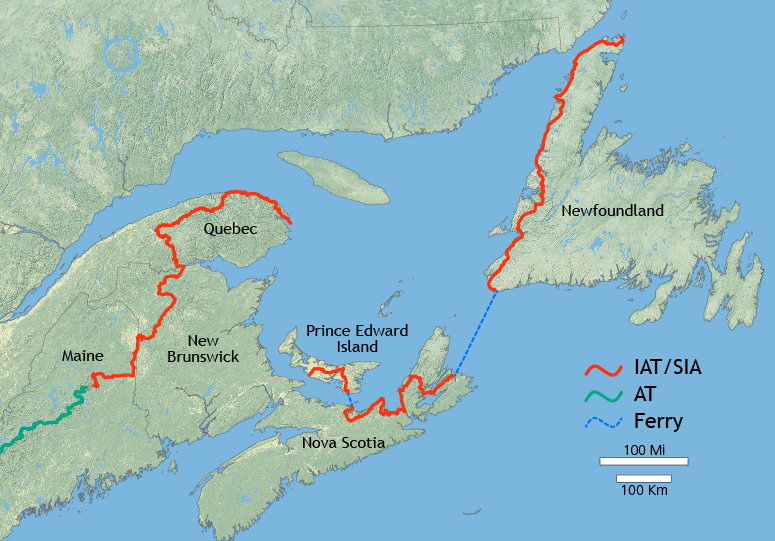
- Map of the International Appalachian Trail in the Atlantic Provinces and Maine
- Length: 2,540 km (1,580 mi)
- Location: Maine, United States, and Canada
- Trailheads: Katahdin Woods and Waters National Monument, Maine – Crow Head, Newfoundland and Labrador
- Use: Hiking
- Highest point: Mount Katahdin
- Lowest point: Cap Gaspé

The International Appalachian Trail (IAT; French: Sentier international des Appalaches, SIA) was originally a hiking trail which ran from Katahdin Woods and Waters National Monument, in Maine, through New Brunswick, to the Gaspé Peninsula of Quebec, after which it followed a ferry route to Newfoundland, and then continued to the northern-easternmost point of the Appalachian Mountains at Belle Isle, Newfoundland and Labrador. As of July 2025, there are widely geographically dispersed IAT-branded walking trails in Greenland, Iceland, Norway, Sweden, Denmark, Scotland, Northern Ireland, Ireland, Isle of Man, Wales, England, Spain, Portugal, and Morocco.

== History ==
The IAT was proposed in 1994 by Richard Anderson, a Maine fisheries biologist, with plans to traverse the portions of the Appalachian Mountains in Maine, New Brunswick, and Quebec that the Appalachian Trail did not cover. Following route selection, construction of the trail took place through the late 1990s.

The first person to thru-hike the IAT, as it then existed, was John Brinda from Washington State, in 1997. He did this as part of a long-distance hike of what is known as the Eastern Continental Trail starting in Key West, Florida ending at Cap Gaspé in Quebec. He was the first person to thru-hike the entire Eastern Continental Trail.

The Newfoundland and Labrador extension to the IAT was proposed in 2003. When completed, it will add an additional 1,200 km of trail. The official opening of the first trail section of the IAT Newfoundland was September 23, 2006.

In 2009, IAT officials met with the British Geological Survey to discuss whether to extend the IAT to the Appalachian terrains of Scotland, Ireland, Northern Ireland, and Wales, setting off a series of expansions through Europe and Northern Africa in which existing trails co-branded with the IAT.

== Route ==
The IAT/SIA starts in Katahdin Woods & Waters National Monument in the U.S. State of Maine. Thence to Mars Hill, Maine, before following the U.S.-Canada border north to Fort Fairfield, Maine, where it crosses the border into Perth-Andover, New Brunswick. It continues up the Tobique River valley to Mount Carleton before crossing the Miramichi Highlands to the Restigouche River valley in Quebec and along the Chic-Choc Mountains of the Gaspé Peninsula, ending at the peninsula's easternmost point, Cap Gaspé in Forillon National Park.

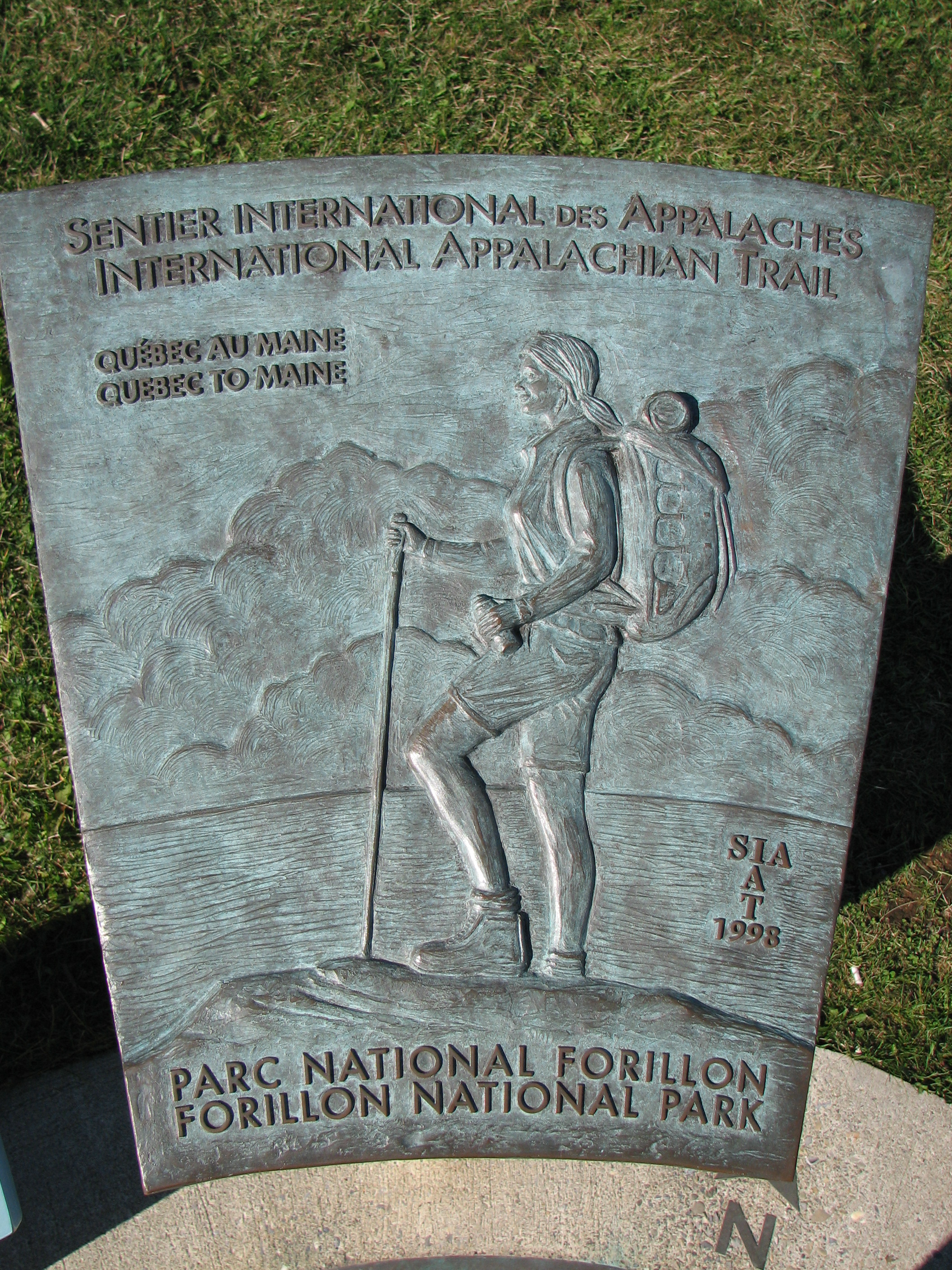
End of the trail in Quebec at Cap Gaspé.

From Cap Gaspé, the IAT skips to a small section in Prince Edward Island, Nova Scotia, and over the Gulf of St. Lawrence to Newfoundland, where the trail picks up again at Channel-Port aux Basques and follows the west coast of the island up the Great Northern Peninsula before terminating at the island's northernmost tip, Cape Bauld. From there the IAT skips over the Strait of Belle Isle to the northern terminus of the Appalachian Mountain chain at Belle Isle.

== Extension to Europe and North Africa ==
Geological evidence shows that the Appalachian Mountains, certain mountains of Western Europe, and the Anti-Atlas range in North Africa are parts of the ancient Central Pangean Mountains, made when minor supercontinents collided to form the supercontinent Pangaea more than 250 million years ago. With the break-up of Pangaea, sections of the former range remained with the continents as they drifted to their present locations. Inspired by this evidence, the IAT has been extended into Western Europe and North Africa.

In 2010 and 2011, chapters of the International Appalachian Trail were established in Greenland, Scotland (the West Highland Way became the first IAT trail in Europe), Norway, Sweden, Denmark, the Netherlands, England, Ulster-Ireland, Wales, the Faroe Islands, Iceland, Spain and Morocco.

== Highlights ==
Parks along the IAT include:

Canada

- Mount Carleton Provincial Park (New Brunswick)
- Gaspésie National Park (a Quebec national park)
- Forillon National Park (Quebec)
- Sir Richard Squires Provincial Park (Newfoundland)
- Ship's Arm Provincial Park (Newfoundland)
- Gros Morne National Park (Newfoundland)

Europe

- The Giant's Causeway, Northern Ireland
- Pembrokeshire Coast National Park, Wales
- Loch Lomond and The Trossachs National Park, Scotland

== See also ==
- New England-Acadian forests
