= L'Anse-au-Griffon, Quebec =

L’Anse-au-Griffon
- Unincorporated community
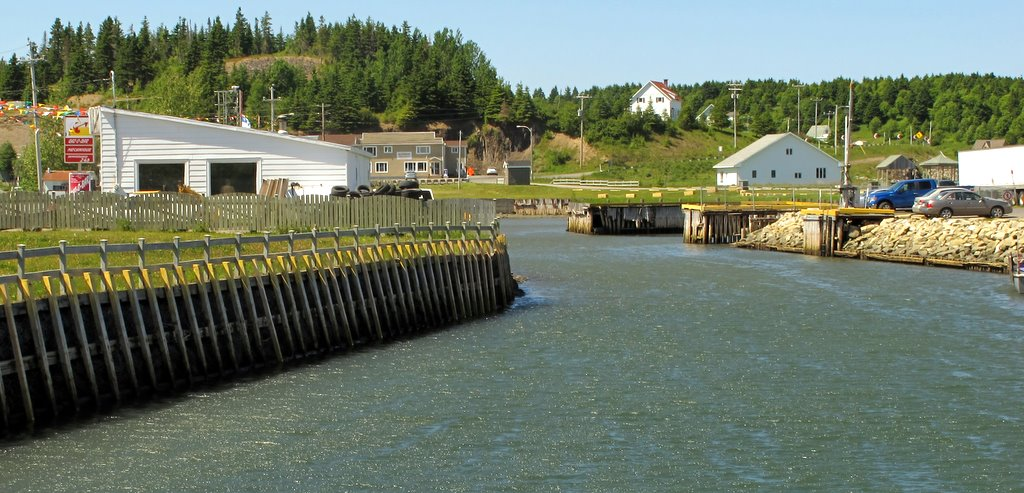
- L’Anse-au-Griffon

- Location within Quebec
- Coordinates: 48°55′42″N 64°17′14″W
- Country: Canada
- Province: Quebec
- Region: Gaspésie-Îles-de-la-Madeleine
- RCM: La Côte-de-Gaspé
- Municipality: Gaspé
- Time zone: UTC-5 (EST)
  - Summer (DST): UTC-4 (EDT)
- Area code: 418

L’Anse-au-Griffon is a village in the municipality of Gaspé in the province of Quebec, Canada. It is located on the north shore of the Forillon Peninsula, on the eponymous Griffin Cove, not far north of the main settlement of Gaspé, and is bordered by the village of Rivière-au-Renard to the west, Cap-des-Rosiers to the east, and the Gulf of Saint Lawrence north and Forillon National Park to the south.

The place became inhabited towards the end of the 18th century. It was important in the fishing industry in the 19th century. John LeBoutillier, a businessman from Jersey built warehouses for salt, flour and salt cod in 1840. He also built a mansion to oversee its business in the region. Built in 1860, this mansion is now part of Canadian heritage. Its post office opened in 1868, known by the English name Griffin Cove until 1921 when it was changed to the current French equivalent.

On February 1, 1870, the village was incorporated as a municipality. In 1971, it was amalgamated, together with 10 other municipalities, into the Town of Gaspé.

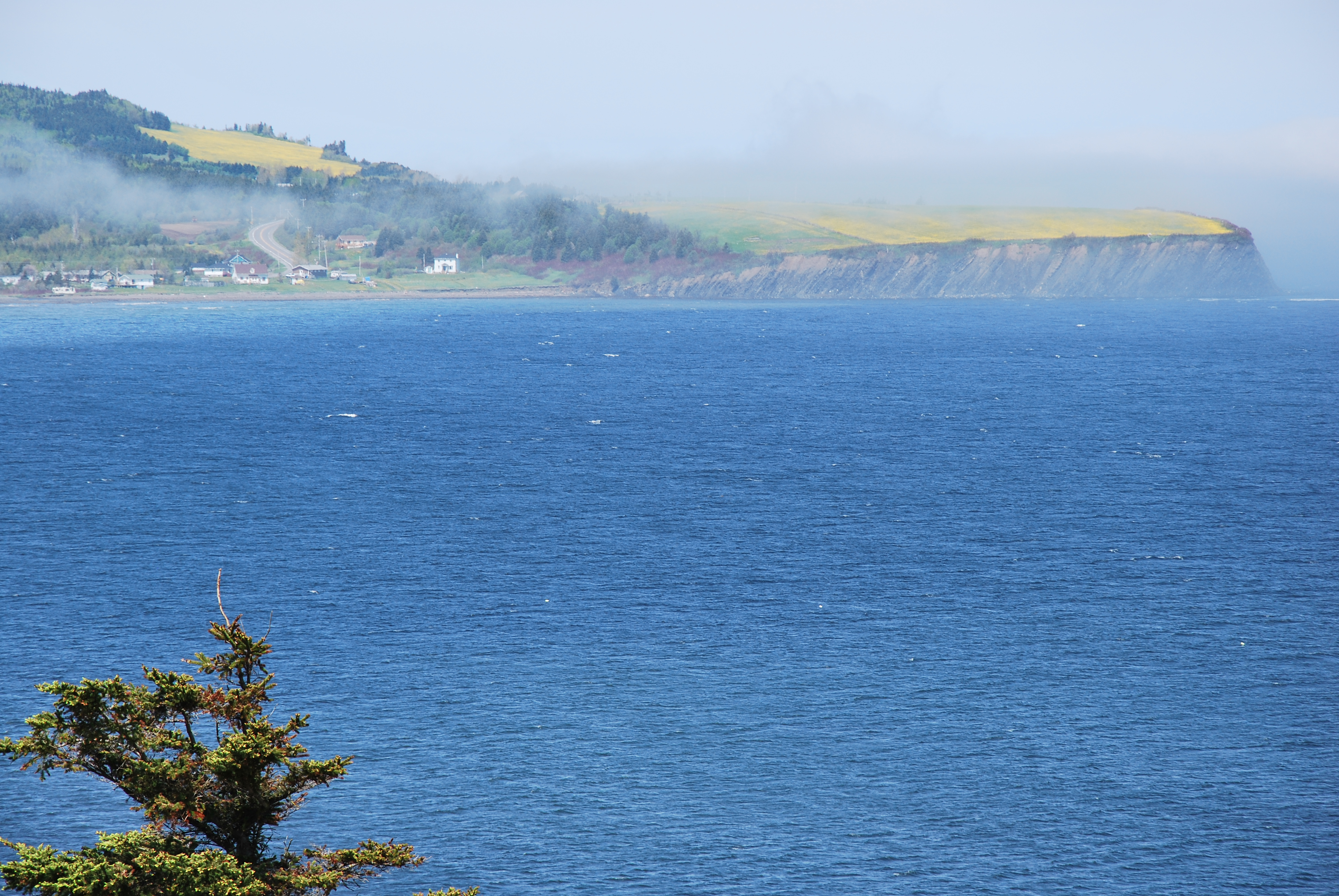
