= Gaspé Peninsula =

Peninsula in Quebec, Canada

- Region
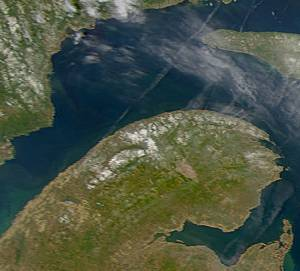
- NASA satellite image of the Gaspé Peninsula. Part of Anticosti Island appears to the northeast.

- Location within Quebec Location within Canada
- Coordinates: 48°39′29″N 65°45′10″W
- Country: Canada
- Province: Quebec

Area
  - Land: 31,075.36 km^{2} (11,998.26 sq mi)

Population (2011)
  - Total: 140,599
  - Density: 4.5/km^{2} (12/sq mi)

The Gaspé Peninsula, also known as Gaspesia (French: Gaspésie, [ɡaspezi]), is a peninsula on the southern side of the St. Lawrence River, in Quebec, Canada. It is separated from New Brunswick to the south by Chaleur Bay. The name Gaspé comes from the Mi'kmaq word gespe'g, meaning "end (of the land)".

The Gaspé Peninsula is slightly larger than Belgium, at 31,075 square kilometres (11,998 sq mi). The population was 140,599 at the 2011 census.

== Geography ==
Sea cliffs dominate the peninsula's northern shore along the St. Lawrence River. Cap Gaspé, jutting into the Gulf of St. Lawrence, is the easternmost point of the peninsula. Percé Rock (or Rocher Percé), an island pierced by a natural arch, is just offshore of the peninsula's eastern end. The peninsula's interior is a rugged northward continuation of the Appalachian Mountains called the Chic-Chocs, with Mount Jacques-Cartier at 1,268 metres (4,160 ft) the peninsula's highest peak.

Mount Albert (Mont Albert) at 1,151 m (3,776 ft) is another high mountain in the Chic-Chocs. Its summit, an alpine area above the tree line, is a nearly flat plateau about 13 km (8 mi) across composed of serpentine bedrock and supporting quite unusual flora. The ascent of Mount Albert from near sea level is challenging, but popular with hikers, offering a view of the St. Lawrence and the Côte-Nord, the river's north shore, part of the ancient bedrock of the Canadian Shield.

=== Inland ===
The interior portions of the peninsula are dominated by the Chic-Choc Mountains, part of the Notre Dame Mountains, an extension of the Appalachian Mountains.

The town of Murdochville, at about 660 metres (2,170 ft) above sea level, has had a varied history, and is now home to several wind turbines. It is reached by Route 198, which extends inland from the northern shore of the peninsula, soon climbing into the mountains and entering vast forests, crossing several small rivers before reaching the town. From Murdochville, Route 198 follows the York River to the city of Gaspé on the peninsula's eastern tip.

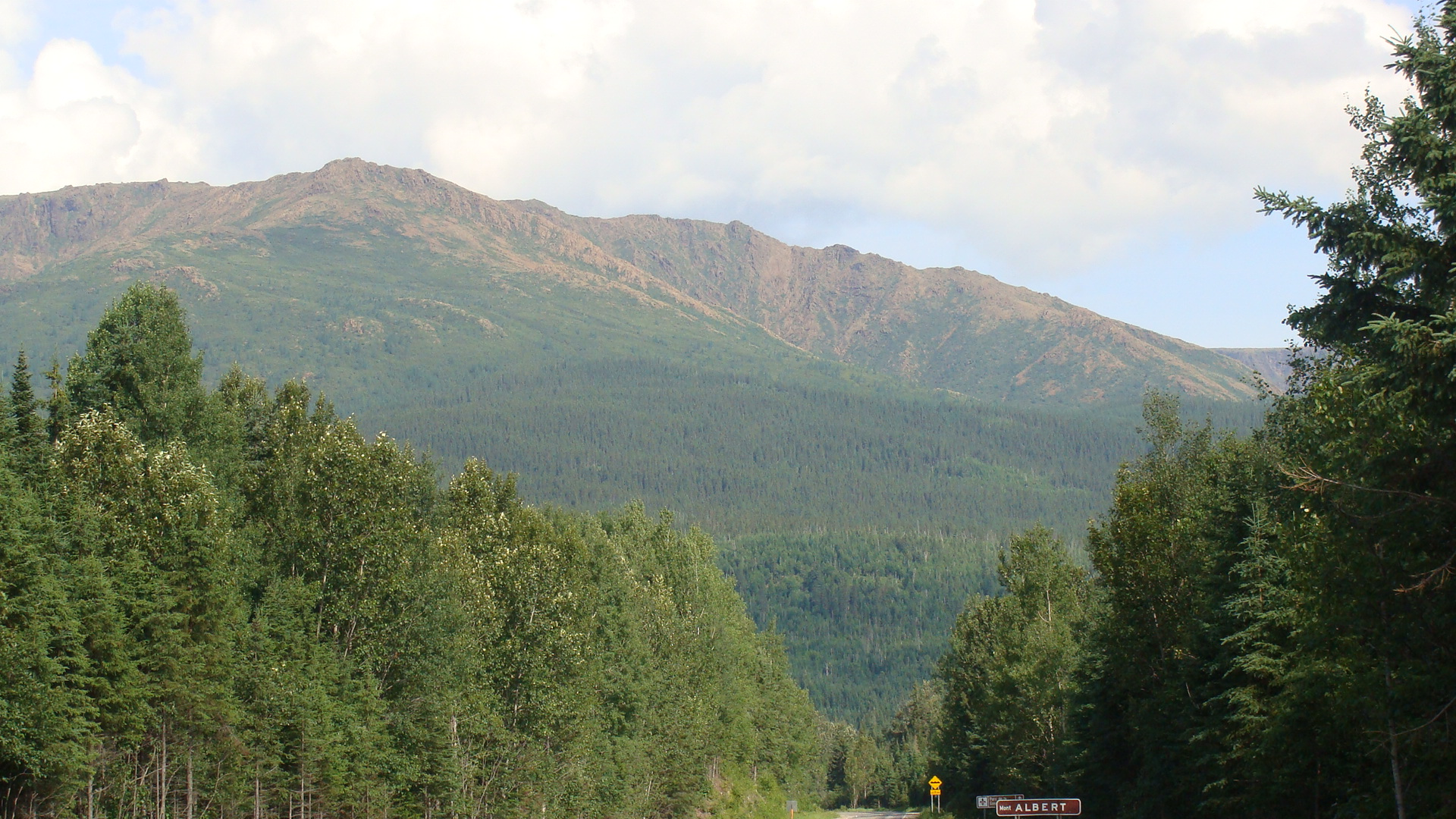
Mont Albert, in the Chic-Choc Mountains of the Gaspé Peninsula

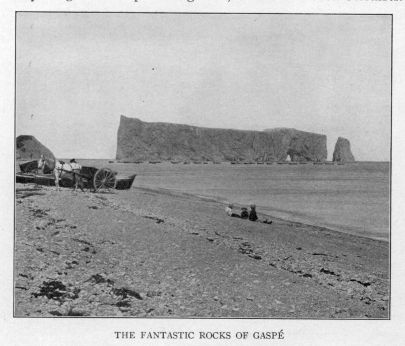
Rocher Percé, c. 1900

== Economy ==
The peninsula's economy has historically been focused on fishing, agriculture and forestry. But primary resource-based industries are suffering due to overfishing, overexploitation, and fewer numbers of farmers in business, forcing the region to move towards tourism and the services industry.

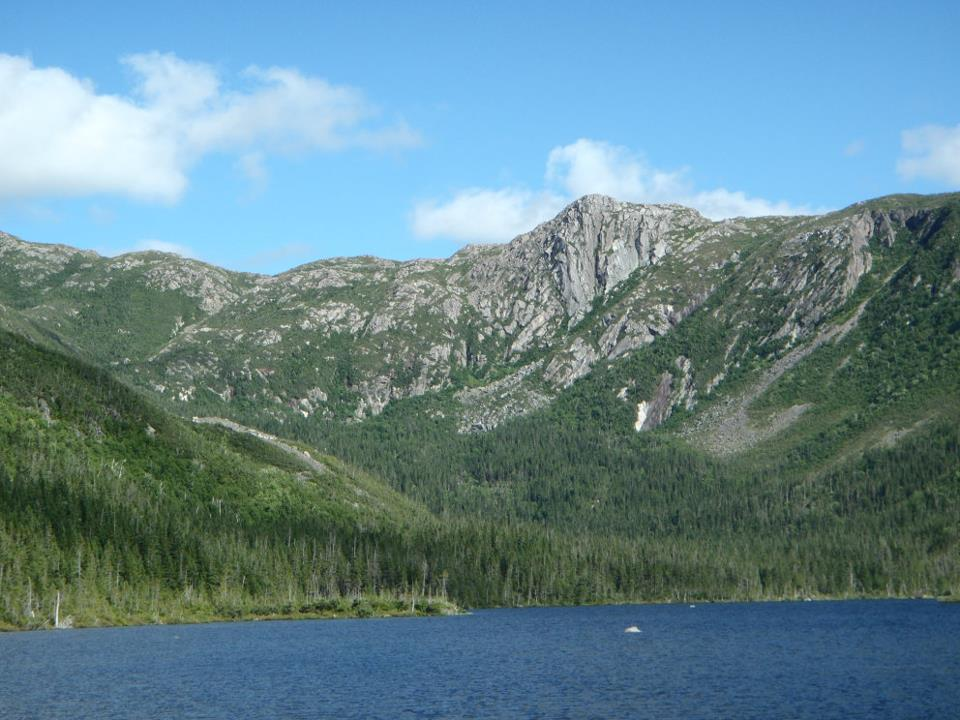
Lac aux Américains in Gaspé National Park (Parc national de la Gaspésie)

=== Tourism ===
The peninsula is one of Quebec's most popular tourism regions. The Gaspé National Park (Parc national de la Gaspésie) is in the Chic-Chocs, and Forillon National Park is at the peninsula's northeastern tip. A section of the International Appalachian Trail travels through the peninsula's mountains. Bonaventure National Park is here. As of September 2018 the area also hosts Canada's third UNESCO Global Geopark.

== Infrastructure ==
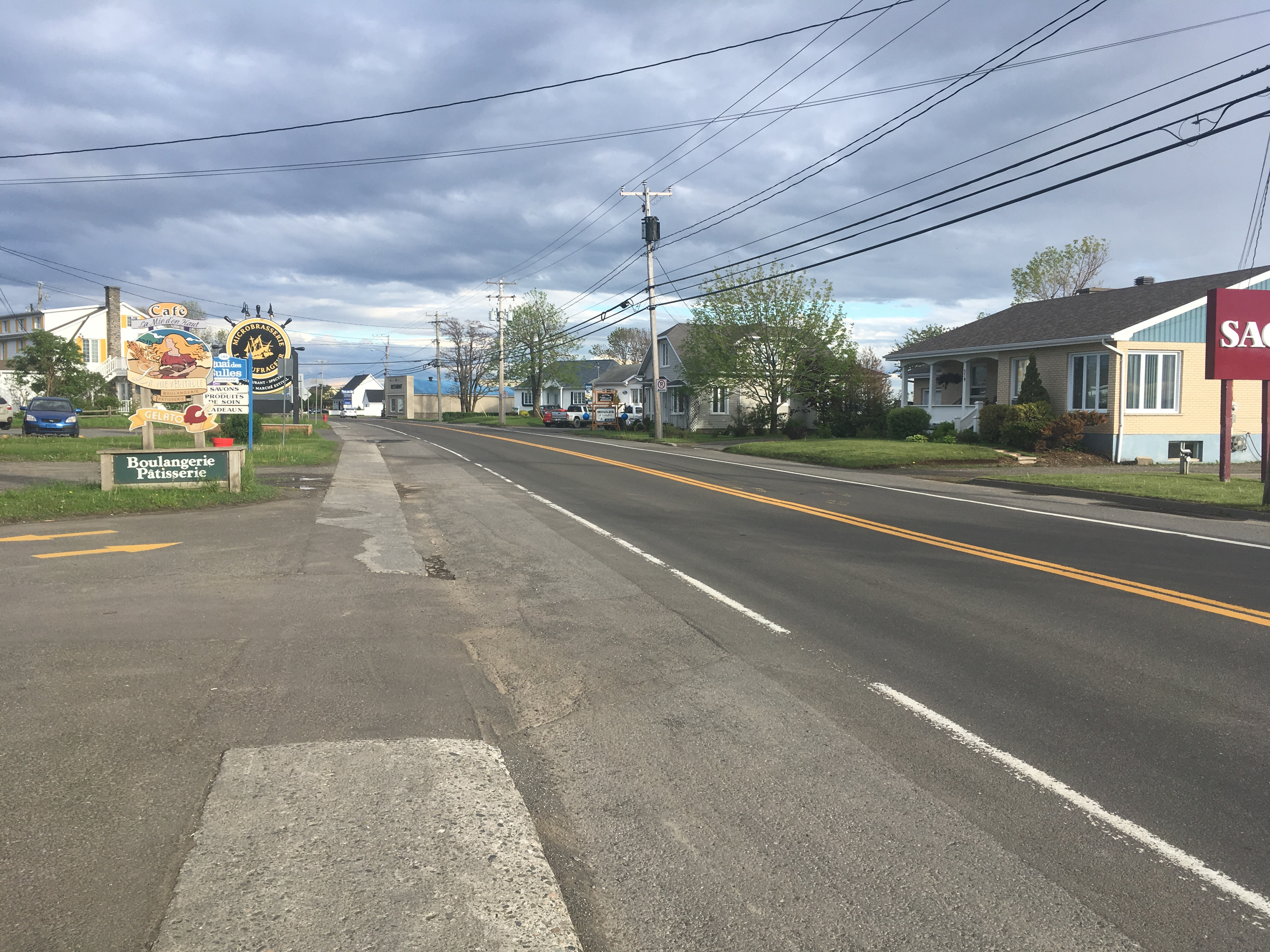
Quebec Route 132 in Carleton-sur-Mer

=== Roads ===
- Quebec Route 132 circles the peninsula, with one branch following the coast and the other cutting across it at Sainte-Flavie.

== See also ==
- Gaspé, Quebec
- Percé, Quebec
- Maritime Quebec
- Maritime Peninsula
- List of people from the Gaspé Peninsula
- List of regions of Quebec
- Acadia (region)
