= Forillon National Park =

National park in Quebec, Canada

- Parc national Forillon
- IUCN category II (national park)
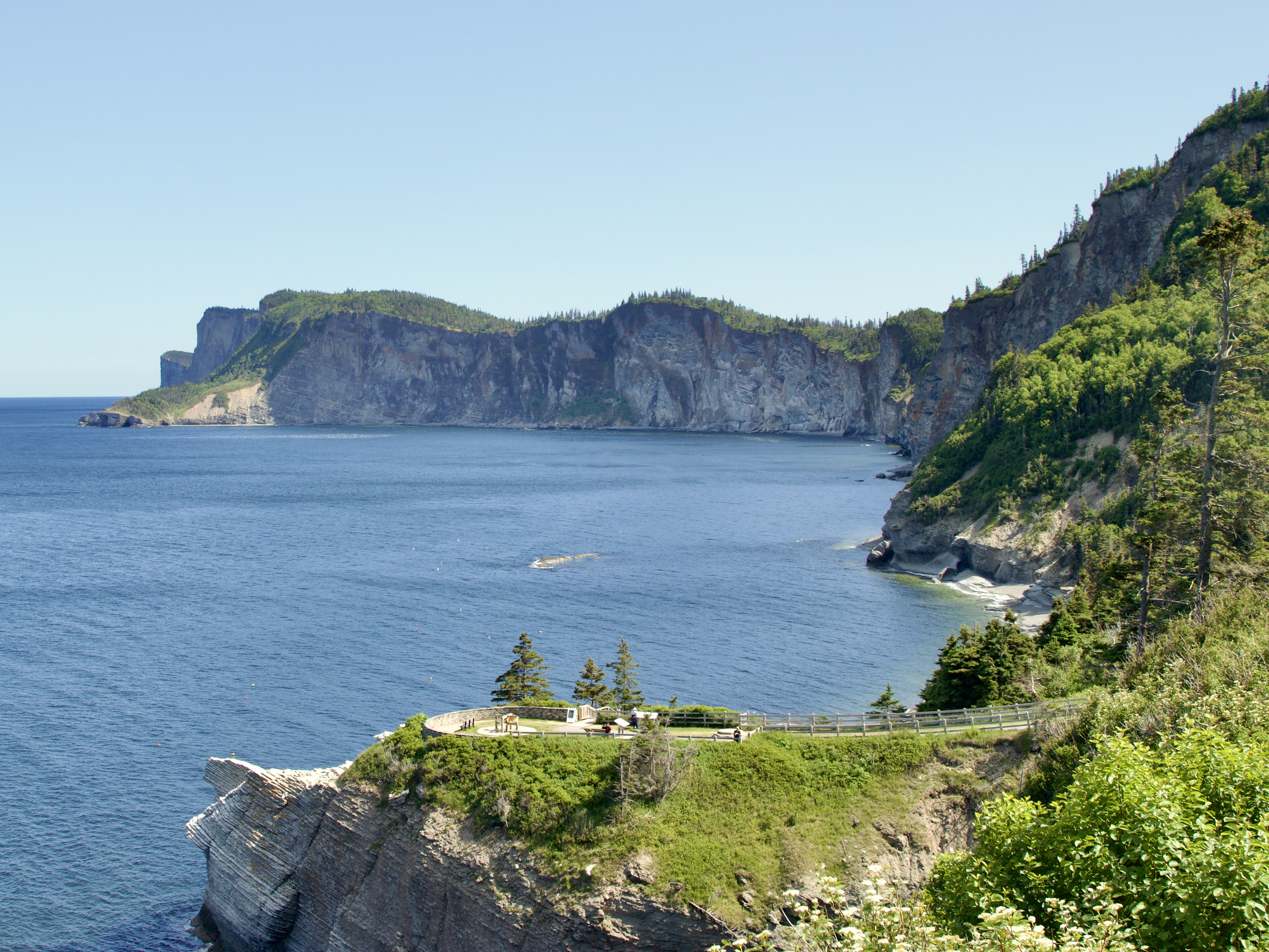
- Cap Bon-Ami at sunset

- Location within Canada Location within Quebec
- Interactive map of Forillon National Park
- Location: Gaspésie–Îles-de-la-Madeleine, La Côte-de-Gaspé Regional County Municipality, Quebec, Canada
- Nearest city: Gaspé, Quebec
- Coordinates: 48°54′N 64°21′W
- Area: 244 km^{2} (94 sq mi)
- Established: 8 June 1970
- Visitors: 164,130 (in 2022–23)
- Governing body: Parks Canada

Forillon National Park, one of 42 national parks and park reserves across Canada, is located at the outer tip of the Gaspé Peninsula of Quebec and covers 244 km^{2} (94 sq mi).

Created in 1970, Forillon was the first national park in Quebec. The park includes forests, sea coast, salt marshes, sand dunes, cliffs, and the Eastern End of the Appalachians. The word forillon is thought to have referred to a flowerpot island or sea stack which used to be a landmark in the area but has since collapsed into the ocean.

== History ==
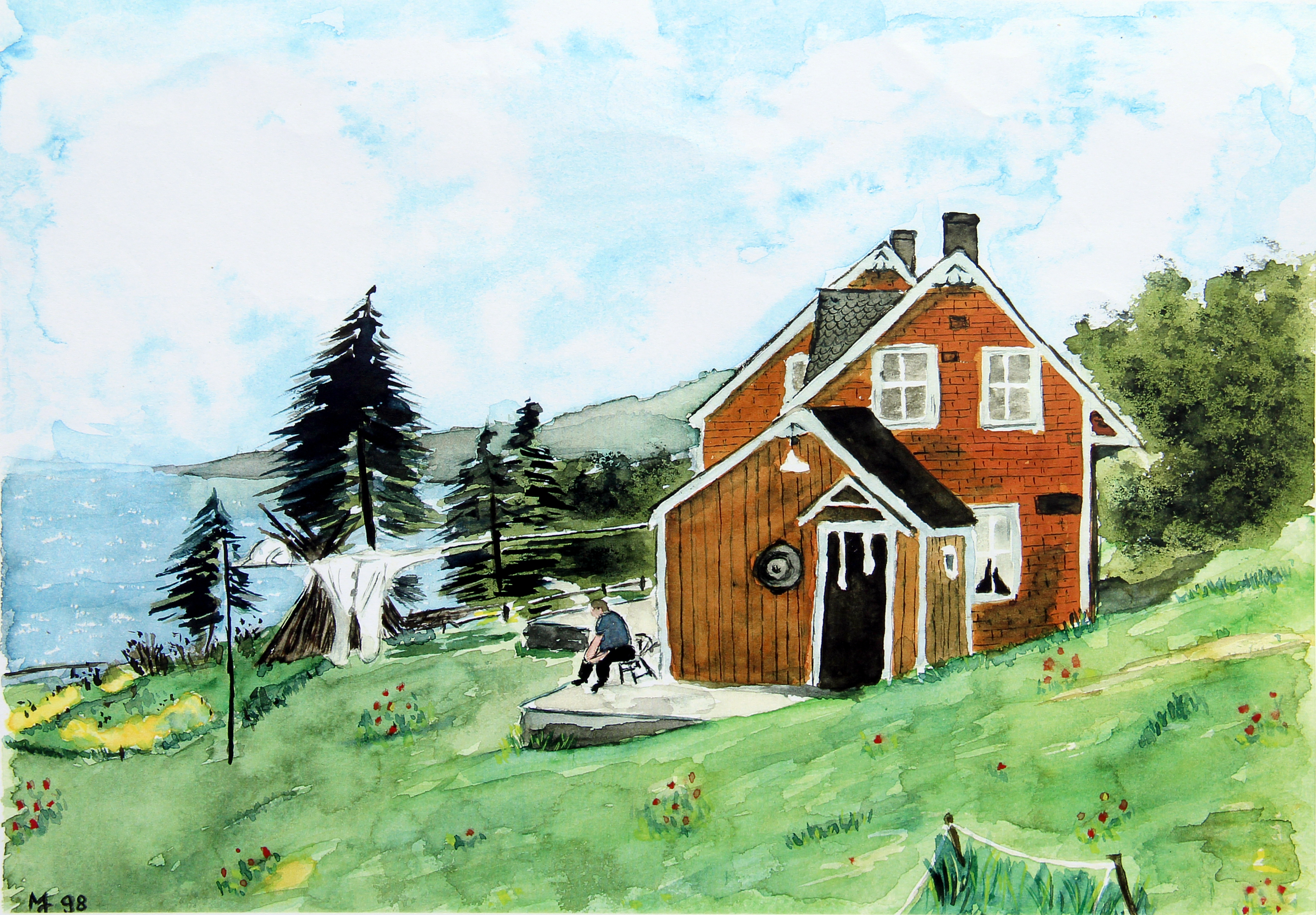
Former fisherman's house of the park

The area was a traditional summer hunting and fishing ground for the Mi'kmaq and Haudenosaunee people.

This area was once used for its rich supply of wood. People living in L'Anse-au-Griffon were once involved in the lumber industry here.

The creation of the park in 1970 was preceded by the removal of 225 families through expropriation. When preparing to create the new park, the Government of Canada requested that the Quebec government expropriate the homes of these families. The Quebec government sub-contracted the appropriation and negotiations to a private firm. This firm allegedly used various bullying tactics to scare the residents into agreeing to settlements of reduced value. This stratagem ensured a larger profit margin for the contractor. On 14 February 2011, the House of Commons adopted a motion which issued an official apology to the people whose properties were expropriated to create Forillon Park. The motion read:

That this House issue an official apology to the people whose properties were expropriated to create Forillon Park for the unconscionable manner in which they were treated, and that the Speaker of the House send the representatives of the people whose properties were expropriated and of their descendants an official copy of the Journals of the House of Commons indicating the adoption of this motion.

This expropriation is the subject of a song titled "Forillon" by the group Le Vent du Nord on their album Têtu. This song is based on Maurice Joncas' poem "La complainte de Forillon", set to music by Pierre Michaud.

== Wildlife ==
This national park includes nesting colonies of sea birds and whales, and seals as well as woodland mammalian species which are red fox, black bear, moose, lynx, mink, coyote, woodchuck, porcupine, snowshoe hare, beaver, and ermine. Raptors that inhabit this park are great horned owls, northern harriers, peregrine falcons, kestrels, bald eagles, rough-legged hawks, and ospreys.

== Activities and sights ==
Activities at interpretation sites bring visitors to learn more about human and natural life in the Forillon peninsula. The Grande-Grave National Heritage Site attests to the way of life of fishing families. The Hyman Store features collections of articles that were sold at the time, and the store "owners" tell tales of thriving fisheries industry. Close by, the pedestrian walk "Une Tournée dans les Parages" brings visitors around houses, fields and agricultural and commercial installations from the beginning of the twentieth century. Along the shores, whale watching is available.

Forillon encloses the site of Fort Péninsule, near the Penouille beach. This fortification was built during World War II to protect the Gaspé bay, as was Fort Prével on the other side of the bay; had Germany conquered all of Europe, these forts would have sheltered British warships seeking refuge from German submarines. Visitors today can enter a tunnel to see cannon in place since that time.

The International Appalachian Trail passes through this park, ending at the peninsula's easternmost point, Cap Gaspé.

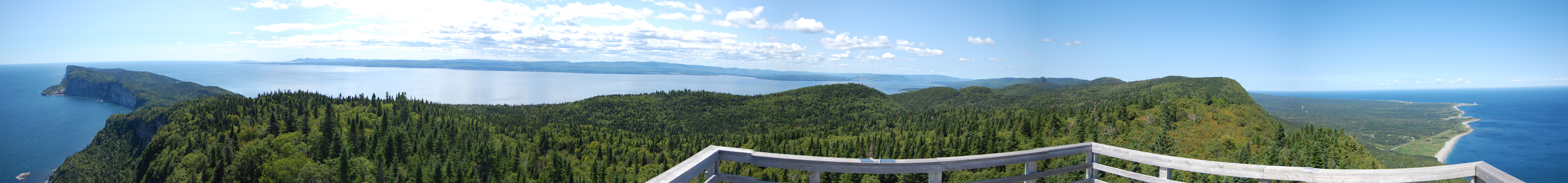
The park as seen from the viewpoint atop Mt-St-Alban, looking southeast (at left) to northwest (at right).

== See also ==
- National Parks of Canada
- List of National Parks of Canada
- List of Quebec national parks
