= Belle Isle (Newfoundland and Labrador) =

Island off of Newfoundland and Labrador, Canada

Coordinates: 51°55′44″N 55°21′33″W

The island is located above the northern tip of Newfoundland

Belle Isle (/bɛl ˈaɪl/ bel EYEL, French: [bɛl il]; French for 'Beautiful Island') is an island slightly more than 24 km (15 mi) off the coast of Labrador and slightly less than 32 km (20 mi) north of Newfoundland at the Atlantic entrance to the Strait of Belle Isle, which takes its name. Officially uninhabited, the island has some seasonal occupation during fishing season.

Named by the Breton explorer Jacques Cartier, the island lies on the shortest shipping lane between the Great Lakes and Europe and is on the main north-south shipping route to Hudson Bay and the Northwest Territories. The northern terminus of the Eastern Continental Trail is on Belle Isle.

== Geography ==
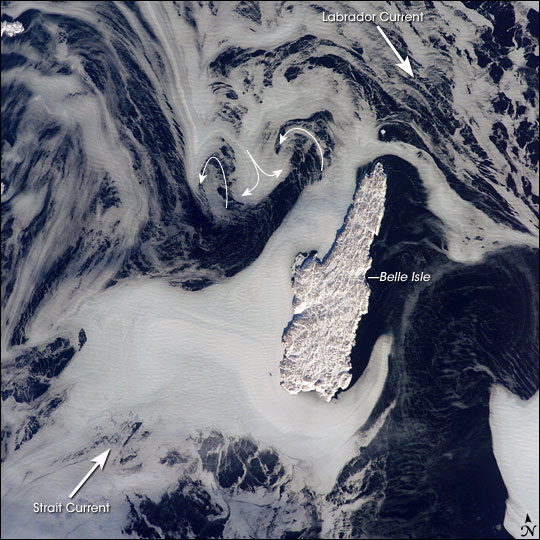
Astronaut photo of Belle Isle showing the interaction of the Labrador Current and that from the Strait of Belle Isle

Belle Isle rises to about 213 m (699 ft) at its highest point and is 52 km^{2} (20 sq mi) in area, 17 km (11 mi) long and 6 km (3.7 mi) wide. It is nearly 24 km (15 mi) from either coast, but it is slightly closer to the Labrador side of the Strait of Belle Isle, and it has a lighthouse (supported by flying buttresses) at both its northern and its southern ends.

Officially uninhabited, the island has some seasonal occupation during fishing season.

Belle Isle is the northernmost peak of the Appalachian Mountains, which extend in various shapes over 3,200 km (2,000 mi) southwest to Alabama, United States.

Ice patterns show that the island lies at the meeting point of two sea currents. The Labrador Current flows from the northwest, and a smaller current, driven by dominant westerly winds, flows from the southwest. Flow lines in sea ice give a sense of the movement of the ice. Ice floes embedded in the Labrador Current appear as a relatively open pattern. Sea ice with a denser pattern enters from the strait, banking against the west side of Belle Isle.

Tendrils flow around capes at both ends of the island, with an ice-free "shadow" on the opposite, downstream side. Eddies off the western coast in the ice patterns, indicated by curved arrows in this photograph, show the place in which the currents interact north and west of the island.

== Climate ==
Belle Isle has a marginal subarctic climate (Köppen climate classification Dfc), exceptionally cold for a coastal location so far south as the 51st parallel. As an illustration, Dunkirk on the opposite side of the Atlantic averages 11.8 °C (21.2 °F) warmer for the year as a whole, due to the contrasting currents on the eastern and western sides of the Icelandic Low. The climate features short, cool summers and long, severely cold winters lasting most of the year. Precipitation peaks during the warmer months of June to September in the form of rain.

Climate data for Belle Isle (1941−1970 normals, extremes 1884−1969)
Month	Jan	Feb	Mar	Apr	May	Jun	Jul	Aug	Sep	Oct	Nov	Dec	Year
Record high °C (°F)	4 (40)	4 (40)	7 (45)	13 (56)	15 (59)	21 (69)	23 (73)	22 (72)	21 (69)	14 (58)	12 (54)	7 (45)	23 (73)
Mean daily maximum °C (°F)	−6.1 (21.0)	−5.9 (21.3)	−3.4 (25.8)	−0.2 (31.6)	3.8 (38.8)	8.2 (46.7)	12.7 (54.8)	13.2 (55.7)	10.1 (50.1)	5.2 (41.4)	1.2 (34.2)	−3.3 (26.1)	2.9 (37.3)
Daily mean °C (°F)	−9.6 (14.7)	−9.3 (15.2)	−6.4 (20.4)	−2.7 (27.2)	1.2 (34.1)	5.0 (41.0)	9.4 (48.9)	10.2 (50.4)	7.3 (45.2)	2.8 (37.0)	−1.2 (29.8)	−6.2 (20.8)	0.1 (32.1)
Mean daily minimum °C (°F)	−13.1 (8.4)	−12.7 (9.1)	−9.4 (15.0)	−5.1 (22.8)	−1.4 (29.4)	1.8 (35.3)	6.1 (43.0)	7.3 (45.1)	4.6 (40.3)	0.3 (32.6)	−3.7 (25.4)	−9.2 (15.5)	−2.9 (26.8)
Record low °C (°F)	−35 (−31)	−34 (−30)	−29 (−20)	−23 (−10)	−16 (4)	−7 (19)	−4 (25)	−2 (29)	−3 (26)	−11 (12)	−21 (−6)	−34 (−30)	−35 (−31)
Average precipitation mm (inches)	55 (2.16)	59 (2.33)	56 (2.19)	56 (2.22)	65 (2.54)	84 (3.32)	77 (3.05)	100 (3.95)	91 (3.60)	90 (3.55)	94 (3.69)	65 (2.56)	893 (35.16)
Average rainfall mm (inches)	17 (0.66)	18 (0.72)	17 (0.65)	24 (0.96)	55 (2.18)	83 (3.25)	77 (3.05)	100 (3.95)	91 (3.58)	84 (3.30)	63 (2.49)	25 (1.00)	655 (25.79)
Average snowfall cm (inches)	38 (15.0)	41 (16.2)	39 (15.2)	32 (12.7)	9.1 (3.6)	1.8 (0.7)	0.0 (0.0)	0.0 (0.0)	0.76 (0.3)	9.9 (3.9)	29 (11.3)	40 (15.6)	240 (94.5)
Average precipitation days (≥ 0.01 in)	12	12	13	12	12	12	12	13	13	12	13	13	149
Average rainy days (≥ 0.01 in)	2	2	3	4	9	12	12	13	13	11	9	3	93
Average snowy days (≥ 0.1 in)	11	10	11	8	4	1	0	0	trace	2	6	10	63
Source: ECCC

== See also ==
- List of ghost towns in Newfoundland and Labrador
