= Gaspé, Quebec =

Gaspé
- City
- Gaspé
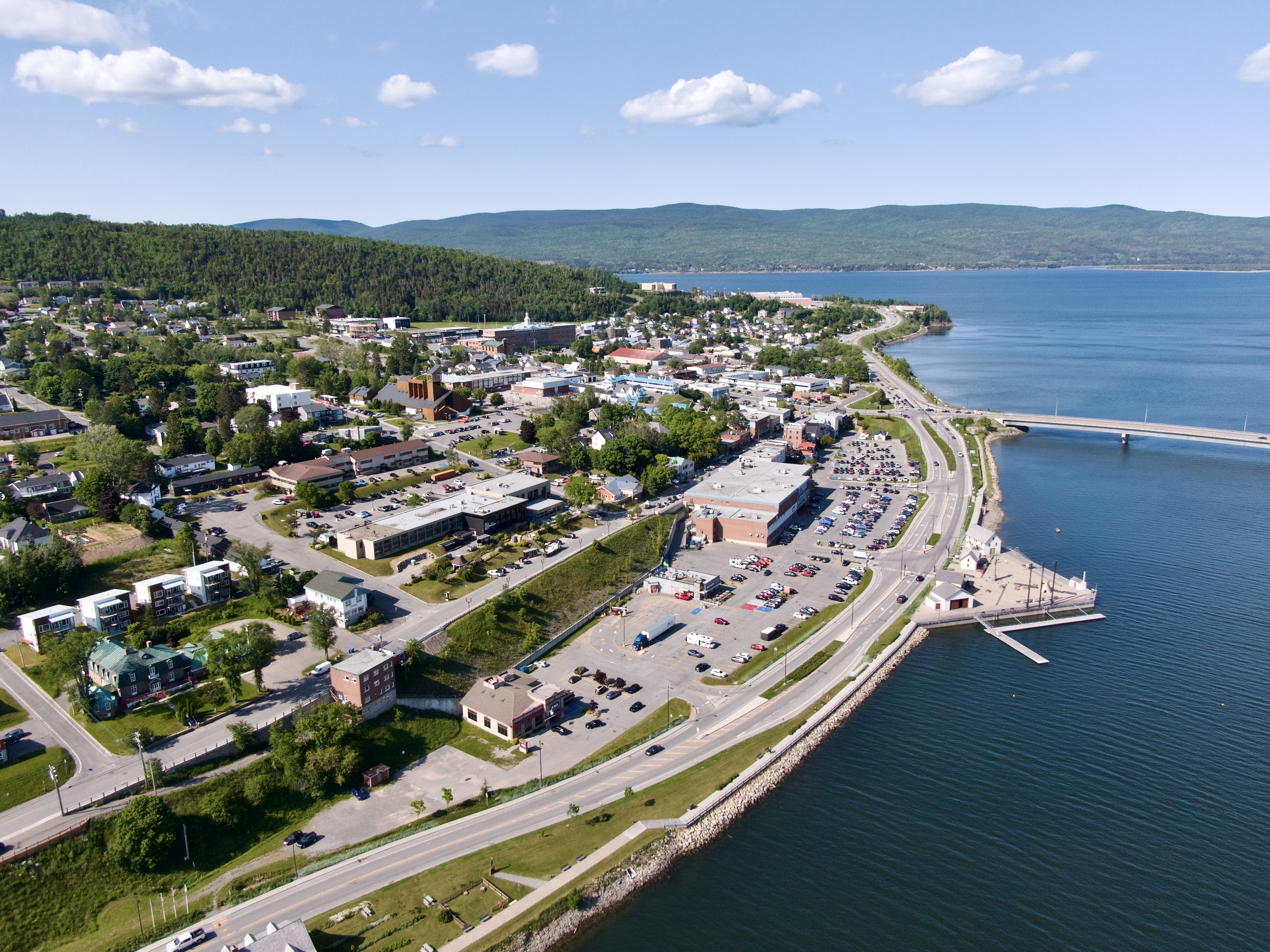
- Downtown Gaspé

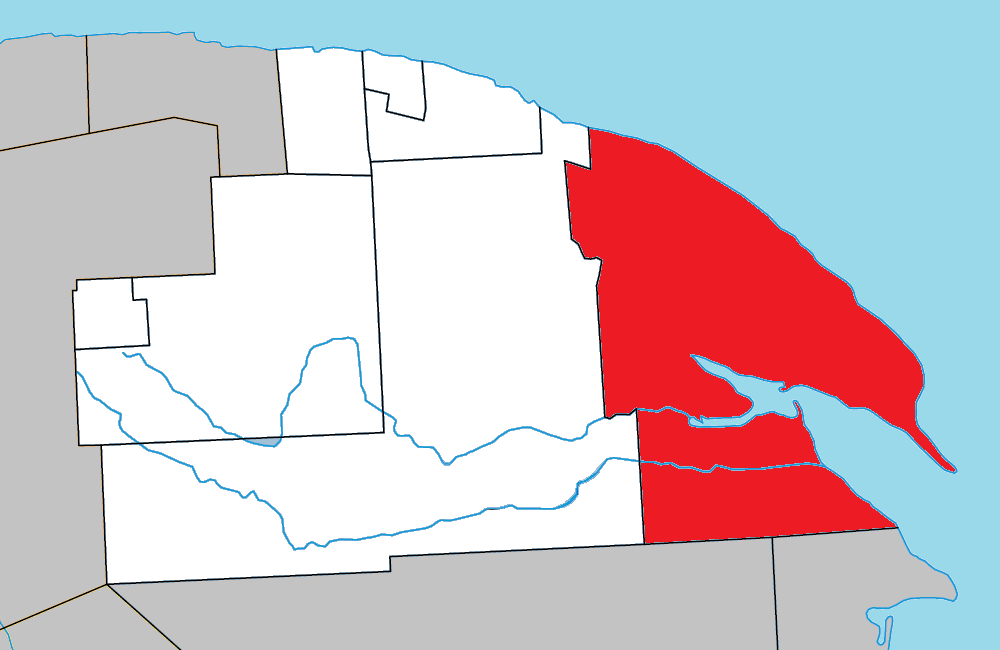
- Location within La Côte-de-Gaspé RCM

- Location in Quebec
- Coordinates: 48°49′54″N 64°29′12″W
- Country: Canada
- Province: Quebec
- Region: Gaspésie– Îles-de-la-Madeleine
- RCM: La Côte-de-Gaspé
- Constituted: January 1, 1971

Government
  - Mayor: Daniel Côté
  - Federal riding: Gaspésie—Les Îles-de-la-Madeleine—Listuguj
  - Prov. riding: Gaspé

Area
  - Total: 1,356.22 km^{2} (523.64 sq mi)
  - Land: 1,118.77 km^{2} (431.96 sq mi)
  - Urban: 7.05 km^{2} (2.72 sq mi)
- Elevation: 34.10 m (111.9 ft)

Population (2021)
  - Total: 15,063
  - Density: 13.5/km^{2} (35/sq mi)
  - Urban: 3,848
  - Urban density: 545.8/km^{2} (1,414/sq mi)
  - Pop (2016–21): ▲3.4%
  - Dwellings: 7,352
- Time zone: UTC−05:00 (EST)
  - Summer (DST): UTC−04:00 (EDT)
- Postal code(s): G4X
- Area codes: 418 and 581
- Highways: R-132 R-198
- Website: www.ville.gaspe.qc.ca

Gaspé (French pronunciation: [ɡaspe]) is a city at the tip of the Gaspé Peninsula in the Gaspésie–Îles-de-la-Madeleine region of eastern Quebec in Canada. Gaspé is about 650 km (400 mi) northeast of Quebec City and 350 km (220 mi) east of Rimouski. Gaspé has a total population of 15,063, as of the 2021 Canadian Census.

Gaspé is where Jacques Cartier took possession of New France (now part of Canada) in the name of François I of France on July 24, 1534. The first French settlement on the Gaspé Peninsula was established in 1672 by Pierre Denys de La Ronde on land that formed part of a seigneury owned by his uncle, Nicolas Denys.

The most common assumption is that "Gaspé" may come from the Miꞌkmaq word Gespeg which means "Land's end". Other theories hold that the name may be a mutation of the Basque word geizpe or kerizpe which means "shelter" or "place of refuge". Another theory is that it is named after Portuguese explorer Gaspar Corte-Real, who explored Labrador in 1500.

In 1600, Englishman Richard Hakluyt used the name Gaspay in his translation of Cosmosgraphie by Jean Alfonse, which became the common spelling in the early 17th century. Thereafter, many other spellings appeared, such as Gachepé, Gachepay, Gaschepay, Gaspey, Gaspèche, and Gapèche.

== History ==
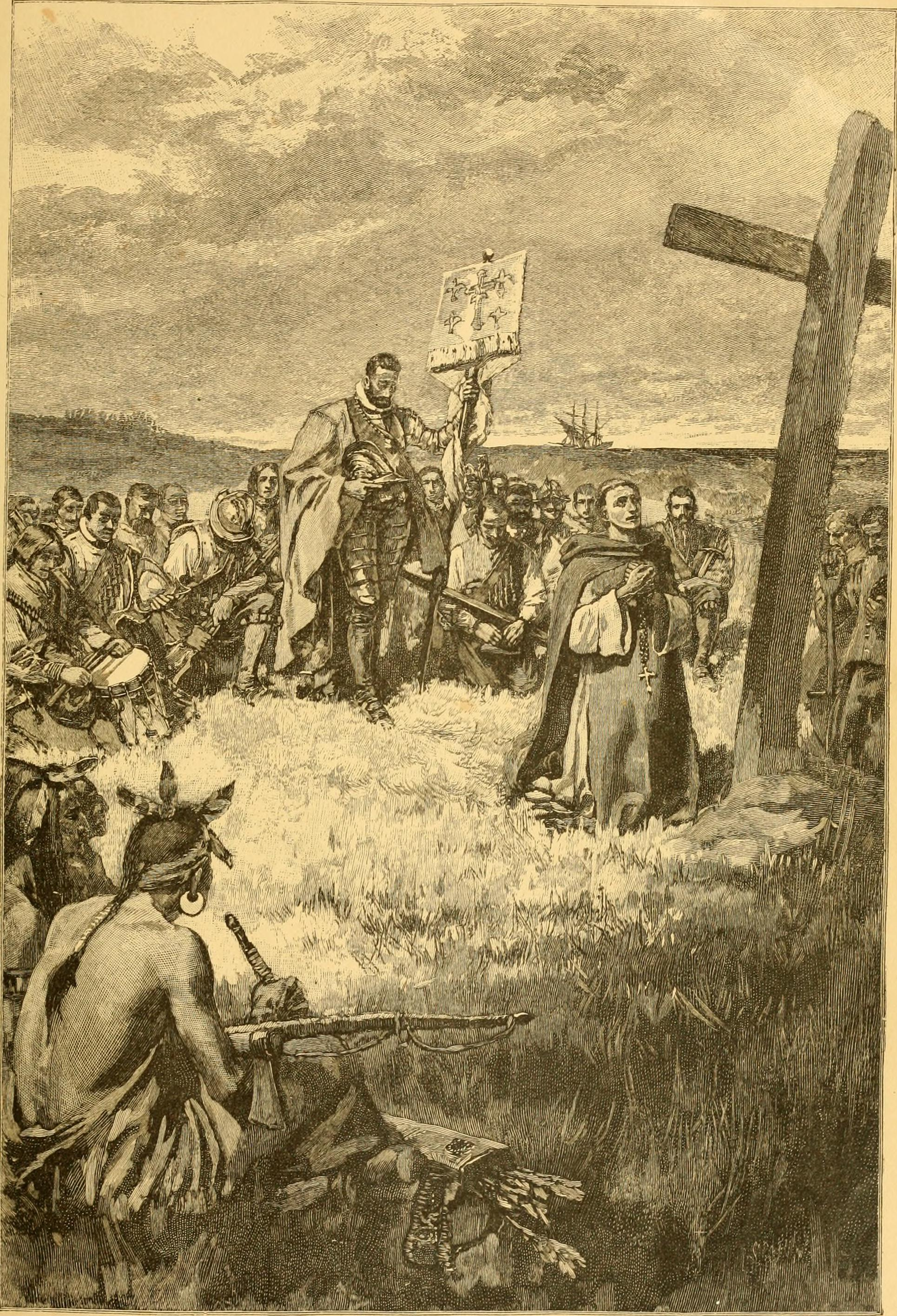
Jacques Cartier setting up a cross at Gaspé in 1534

Gaspé claims the title of "Cradle of French America", because on June 24, 1534, explorer Jacques Cartier halted in the bay after losing an anchor during a storm and claimed possession of the area by planting a wooden cross with the king's coat of arms and the sentence Vive le Roi de France ("Long live the King of France"). Cartier met there an indigenous tribe that called the territory Honguedo, probably a Mi'kmaq word meaning "meeting place".

Following the Treaty of Paris in 1763, British officers and soldiers acquired free land in Gaspé. In 1784, they were joined by many Loyalist settlers. From then on, Gaspé became an important commercial fishing centre, especially of cod. In 1804, its post office opened.

In 1833 in Gaspé County there were only ten farmers, all in the Gaspé Bay area (of whom seven were also involved in the fishery), four whalers in Gaspé Bay, five shipbuilders (one a Jersey firm), one blacksmith, two lumber merchants, five shipowners (all of whom were Jerseymen), 18 fish merchants (13 of whom were Jerseymen) and 32 major fishing establishments (of which 16 were Jersey-owned).

Gaspé was incorporated as a village municipality in 1855. From 1861 to 1866, the port of Gaspé was a duty-free port, making shipping the primary economic activity. With 40 to 50 European ships docking annually, many countries opened consulates in Gaspé, including Italy, the United States, Brazil, Portugal, and Norway. By 1911, the railway reached Gaspé. But the town's ambition to become an international shipping and transportation hub ended with the growing importance of the Montreal and Halifax harbours.

During World War II, 3,000 soldiers were stationed at a naval base built at Sandy Beach to patrol the Gulf of Saint Lawrence against German submarines.

In 1959, Gaspé gained city status. In 1971, the city was greatly expanded when it amalgamated these 11 surrounding municipalities (with year of original incorporation):

- Baie-de-Gaspé-Nord (1855)
- Baie-de-Gaspé-Sud (1855)
- Douglastown (1855)
- Grande-Grève (1944)
- Haldimand (1953)
- L'Anse-aux-Griffons (1870)
- Rivière-au-Renard (1933)
- Saint-Alban-du-Cap-des-Rosiers (1896)
- Saint-Majorique (1966)
- Saint-Maurice (1923)
- York (1866)

In subsequent years, the city's area was further expanded by absorbing large tracts of adjacent unorganized territory.

A representation of a small village, with a dozen houses serving as a historical site, was opened in 2015 in front of the Place Jacques-Cartier mall and above the boardwalk along the York River. The village is a monument to Cartier and serves as a museum for tourists and locals.

== Geography ==
In addition to the city, Gaspé's territory includes the communities of Cap-aux-Os, Cap-des-Rosiers, Douglastown, Haldimand, Jersey Cove, L'Anse-à-Fugère, L'Anse-à-Valleau, L'Anse-au-Griffon, Penouille, Petit-Cap, Petite-Rivière-au-Renard, Pointe-Jaune, Rivière-au-Renard, Rivière-Morris, Sandy Beach, Saint-Majorique, Saint-Maurice-de-l'Échouerie, Wakeham, and York Centre. The city's territory occupies 1,440 km^{2} (560 sq mi) and borders the sea and the St. Lawrence River for some 130 km (81 mi). French is the first language of most of Gaspé's population, where nearly 90% of the population is of French-Canadian origin.

=== Climate ===
In spite of its coastal position, Gaspé experiences a humid continental climate (Köppen climate classification Dfb) with vast seasonal differences in temperature. Summers are warm but relatively short, whereas winters are cold and long, but still far warmer than inland areas of the province given its coastal position. It stays above the subarctic range due to the seasonal lag keeping September temperatures above 10 °C (50 °F) in daily mean. As a result of the seasonal lag, March is a proper winter month and is far colder than November. As typical of Quebec, precipitation and resulting snowfall is high due to the reliable winter temperatures below freezing.

The highest temperature ever recorded in Gaspé was 36.0 °C (96.8 °F) on 27 June 2003. The coldest temperature ever recorded was −41.7 °C (−43.1 °F) on 26 January 1897.

Climate data for Gaspé Airport, 1991–2020 normals, extremes 1895–present (Note: Extreme high and low temperatures in the table below were recorded at Gaspé from August 1895 to April 1968 and at Gaspé Airport from May 1968 to present.)
Month	Jan	Feb	Mar	Apr	May	Jun	Jul	Aug	Sep	Oct	Nov	Dec	Year
Record high humidex	13.3	13.5	21.2	28.8	37.2	42.6	43.1	43.9	40.4	31.5	24.8	16.5	43.9
Record high °C (°F)	14.4 (57.9)	13.7 (56.7)	21.1 (70.0)	27.5 (81.5)	32.6 (90.7)	36.0 (96.8)	35.9 (96.6)	35.6 (96.1)	33.2 (91.8)	29.4 (84.9)	22.6 (72.7)	15.6 (60.1)	36.0 (96.8)
Mean maximum °C (°F)	6.0 (42.8)	4.8 (40.6)	9.5 (49.1)	16.5 (61.7)	25.6 (78.1)	29.9 (85.8)	31.2 (88.2)	30.7 (87.3)	27.7 (81.9)	21.8 (71.2)	15.2 (59.4)	8.3 (46.9)	32.6 (90.7)
Mean daily maximum °C (°F)	−5.6 (21.9)	−4.8 (23.4)	0.4 (32.7)	6.4 (43.5)	13.9 (57.0)	19.7 (67.5)	23.5 (74.3)	23.0 (73.4)	18.4 (65.1)	11.1 (52.0)	4.4 (39.9)	−1.9 (28.6)	9.0 (48.2)
Daily mean °C (°F)	−11.1 (12.0)	−10.8 (12.6)	−5.4 (22.3)	1.4 (34.5)	7.6 (45.7)	13.2 (55.8)	17.1 (62.8)	16.6 (61.9)	11.9 (53.4)	6.0 (42.8)	0.2 (32.4)	−6.3 (20.7)	3.4 (38.1)
Mean daily minimum °C (°F)	−16.7 (1.9)	−16.7 (1.9)	−11.1 (12.0)	−3.5 (25.7)	1.3 (34.3)	6.6 (43.9)	10.7 (51.3)	10.0 (50.0)	5.5 (41.9)	0.8 (33.4)	−4 (25)	−10.7 (12.7)	−2.3 (27.9)
Mean minimum °C (°F)	−27.4 (−17.3)	−28.2 (−18.8)	−23.9 (−11.0)	−11.9 (10.6)	−4.2 (24.4)	−0.5 (31.1)	4.6 (40.3)	3.8 (38.8)	−1.6 (29.1)	−5.8 (21.6)	−13.0 (8.6)	−21.3 (−6.3)	−29.4 (−20.9)
Record low °C (°F)	−41.7 (−43.1)	−38.9 (−38.0)	−32.8 (−27.0)	−20.6 (−5.1)	−11.7 (10.9)	−3.9 (25.0)	−1.1 (30.0)	−1.9 (28.6)	−7.2 (19.0)	−12.2 (10.0)	−23.3 (−9.9)	−32.2 (−26.0)	−41.7 (−43.1)
Record low wind chill	−47.2	−46.0	−37.7	−27.9	−14.3	−5.3	0.0	−1.8	−7.1	−14.5	−28.7	−40.2	−47.2
Average precipitation mm (inches)	87.6 (3.45)	72.9 (2.87)	103.9 (4.09)	87.5 (3.44)	92.2 (3.63)	78.7 (3.10)	100.3 (3.95)	91.2 (3.59)	91.3 (3.59)	130.1 (5.12)	105.0 (4.13)	120.2 (4.73)	1,161 (45.71)
Average rainfall mm (inches)	17.3 (0.68)	6.6 (0.26)	29.0 (1.14)	48.2 (1.90)	86.4 (3.40)	78.7 (3.10)	100.3 (3.95)	91.2 (3.59)	90.2 (3.55)	124.5 (4.90)	75.6 (2.98)	50.0 (1.97)	797.8 (31.41)
Average snowfall cm (inches)	79.6 (31.3)	74.3 (29.3)	79.2 (31.2)	38.5 (15.2)	5.4 (2.1)	0.0 (0.0)	0.0 (0.0)	0.0 (0.0)	0.0 (0.0)	4.4 (1.7)	31.5 (12.4)	72.4 (28.5)	385.3 (151.7)
Average precipitation days (≥ 0.2 mm)	14.9	12.0	13.5	12.1	13.5	13.0	15.9	12.7	11.9	15.0	13.9	16.1	164.5
Average rainy days (≥ 0.2 mm)	2.5	1.7	3.9	8.0	13.3	13.0	15.9	12.7	11.8	14.5	9.1	4.9	111.2
Average snowy days (≥ 0.2 cm)	13.8	11.4	11.4	6.5	1.1	0.0	0.0	0.0	0.0	1.1	7.1	13.7	65.9
Average relative humidity (%) (at 1500 LST)	66.3	62.7	61.6	59.5	57.5	59.3	64.1	62.3	62.0	65.9	70.3	72.5	63.7
Average dew point °C (°F)	−14.8 (5.4)	−14.7 (5.5)	−9.8 (14.4)	−4.0 (24.8)	2.2 (36.0)	8.2 (46.8)	12.7 (54.9)	12.2 (54.0)	7.9 (46.2)	2.1 (35.8)	−3.5 (25.7)	−9.3 (15.3)	−0.8 (30.6)
Mean monthly sunshine hours	106.4	128.6	154.0	162.5	211.7	236.7	251.3	231.8	176.8	131.5	90.1	88.5	1,970.1
Percentage possible sunshine	39.2	44.3	41.8	39.6	44.8	49.2	51.6	52.1	46.7	39.1	34.5	34.6	43.0
Source 1: Environment Canada (sun 1981–2010)
Source 2: weatherstats.ca (for dewpoint and monthly&yearly average absolute maximum&minimum temperature)

== Demographics ==
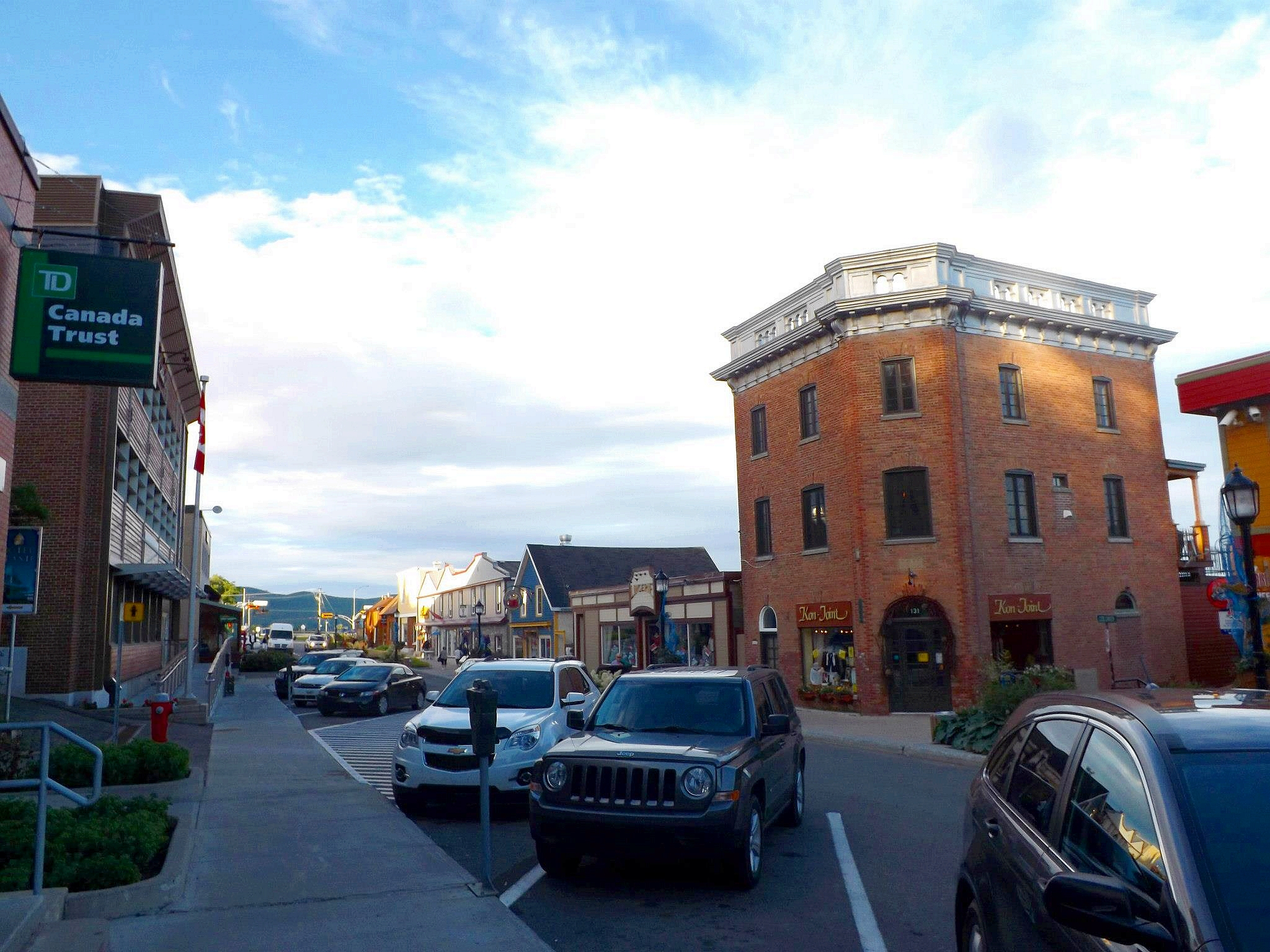
Downtown Gaspé

In the 2021 Census of Population conducted by Statistics Canada, Gaspé had a population of 15,063 living in 6,780 of its 7,352 total private dwellings, a change of 3.4% from its 2016 population of 14,568. With a land area of 1,118.77 km^{2} (431.96 sq mi), it had a population density of 13.5/km^{2} (34.9/sq mi) in 2021.

Canada census – Gaspé community profile

	2021	2016	2011
Population	15,063 (+3.4% from 2016)	14,568 (-3.9% from 2011)	15,163 (+2.2% from 2006)
Land area	1,118.77 km^{2} (431.96 sq mi)	1,121.43 km^{2} (432.99 sq mi)	1,121.07 km^{2} (432.85 sq mi)
Population density	13.5/km^{2} (35/sq mi)	13.0/km^{2} (34/sq mi)	13.5/km^{2} (35/sq mi)
Median age	50.4 (M: 49.6, F: 50.8)	50.0 (M: 49.3, F: 50.6)	47.5 (M: 47.0, F: 48.0)
Private dwellings	7,352 (total) 6,780 (occupied)	7,074 (total)	6,897 (total)
Median household income	$72,000	$59,819	$52,898

Notes: Includes corrections and updates for 2006.
References: 2021 2016 2011

Canada Census Mother Tongue – Gaspé, Quebec
Census	Total	French			English			French & English			Other		
Year	Responses	Count	Trend	Pop %	Count	Trend	Pop %	Count	Trend	Pop %	Count	Trend	Pop %
2021	14,940	12,945	▲3.9%	86.6%	1,560	▼0.6%	10.4%	275	▲57.1%	1.8%	135	▲68.8%	0.9%
2016	14,300	12,460	▼4.8%	87.1%	1,570	▼7.4%	11.0%	175	▲2.9%	1.2%	80	▲45.5%	0.6%
2011	15,010	13,090	▲5.2%	87.2%	1,695	▼10.1%	11.3%	170	▲61.9%	1.1%	55	▼63.3%	0.4%
2006	14,585	12,445	▼2.1%	85.3%	1,885	▲4.7%	12.9%	105	▼8.7%	0.7%	150	▲233.3%	1.0%
2001	14,670	12,710	▼7.9%	86.6%	1,800	▼19.5%	12.3%	115	▲666.6%	0.8%	45	▼78.0%	0.3%
1996	16,250	13,795	n/a	84.9%	2,235	n/a	13.8%	15	n/a	0.1%	205	n/a	1.3%

Historical Census Data – Gaspé, Quebec

Year	Pop.	±%
1881	174	—
1891	307	+76.4%
1901	454	+47.9%
1911	606	+33.5%
1921	764	+26.1%
1931	919	+20.3%
1941	924	+0.5%
1951	1,692	+83.1%

Year	Pop.	±%
1956	2,194	+29.7%
1961	2,603	+18.6%
1966	2,938	+12.9%
1971*	17,211	+485.8%
1976	16,842	−2.1%
1981	17,261	+2.5%
1986	17,350	+0.5%
1991	16,402	−5.5%

Year	Pop.	±%
1996	16,517	+0.7%
2001	14,932	−9.6%
2006	14,834	−0.7%
2011	15,163	+2.2%
2016	14,568	−3.9%
2021	15,063	+3.4%

(*) Gaspé annexed the Municipality of Baie-de-Gaspé-Sud, the Municipality of Grande-Grève, the Municipality of Haldimand, the Municipality of L’Anse-aux-Griffons, the Municipality of Rivière-au-Renard, the Municipality of Saint-Alban-du-Cap-des-Rosiers, the Municipality of Saint-Majorique, the Municipality of York, the Parish of Saint-Maurice, the Township of Baie-de-Gaspé-Nord and the Township of Douglas.
Source: Statistics Canada

== Economy ==
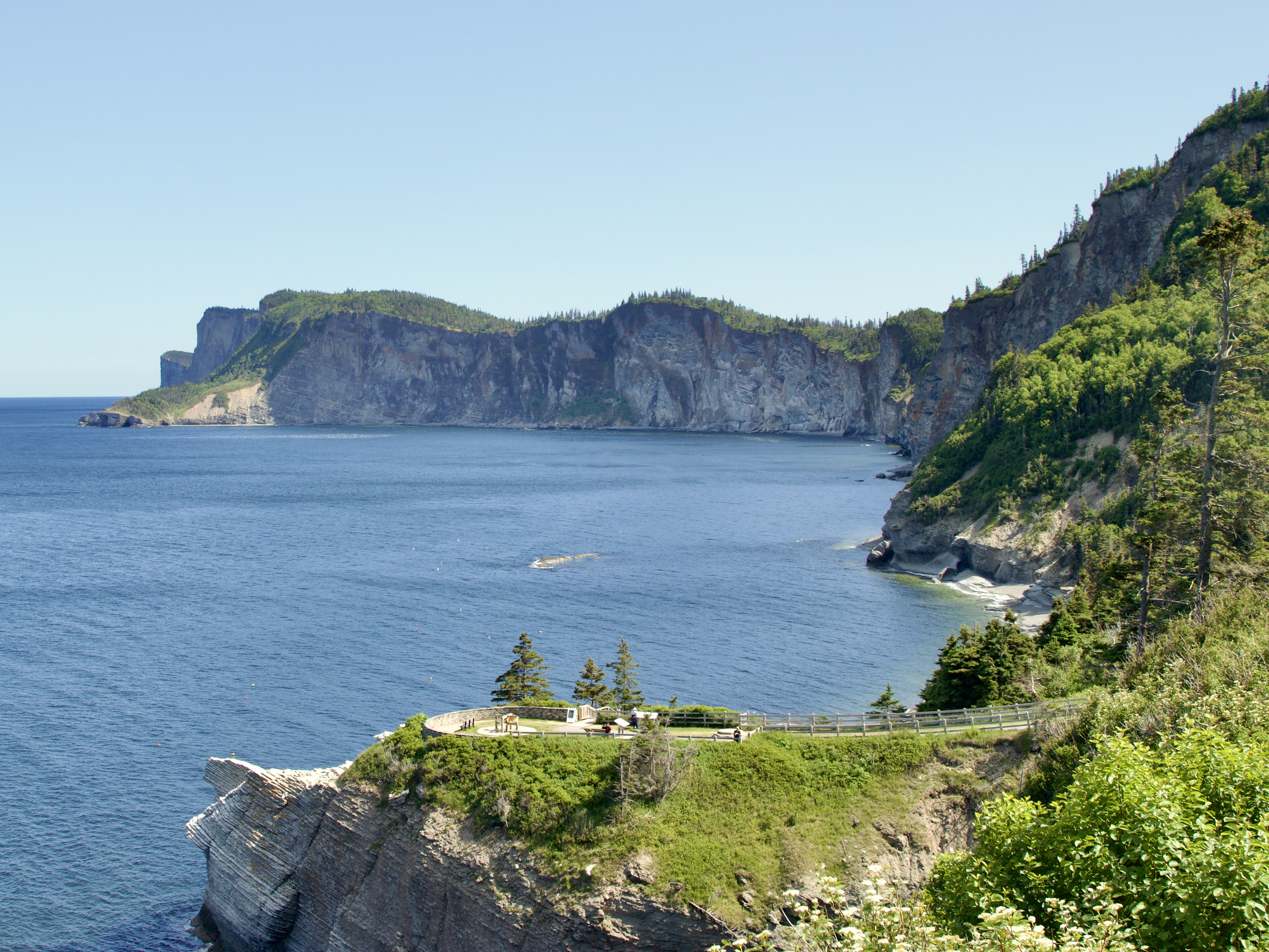
Cap Bon-Ami in Forillon National Park

The regional hospital is the main employer in the city. Tourism is a very important part of the city and the region's economy. Many visitors come to the city to enjoy the environment and the surrounding attractions, such as Forillon National Park that is fully within the city's boundaries. One of the main summer attractions for tourists is salmon fishing. The York River, Saint John's River, and the Dartmouth River are where tourists and locals come to fish. It is not required to have a guide while fishing these rivers but a private guide can be hired upon request. Other tourist attractions include Haldimand Beach, Jacques Cartier's Cross (stone monument), and a local museum which shelters the World War I and World War II cenotaph commemorating Gaspésian veterans.

Another big employer is the LM Wind Power Canada Inc. factory that makes the windmill blades to then have them transported elsewhere. The windmill factory is a tourist attraction where tourist can see the big size of the blades and have the opportunity to take a picture next to one. The factory was expanded in 2015 by a joint venture with Senvion to produce long-blade turbine components for the Mesgi'g Ugju's'n wind farm, developed by Longueuil, Quebec-based Innergex in Avignon Township. The $365-million project, one of over two dozen financed by Hydro-Quebec and the provincial government, was completed on time in December 2016.

== Attractions ==
=== Cross of Gaspé ===
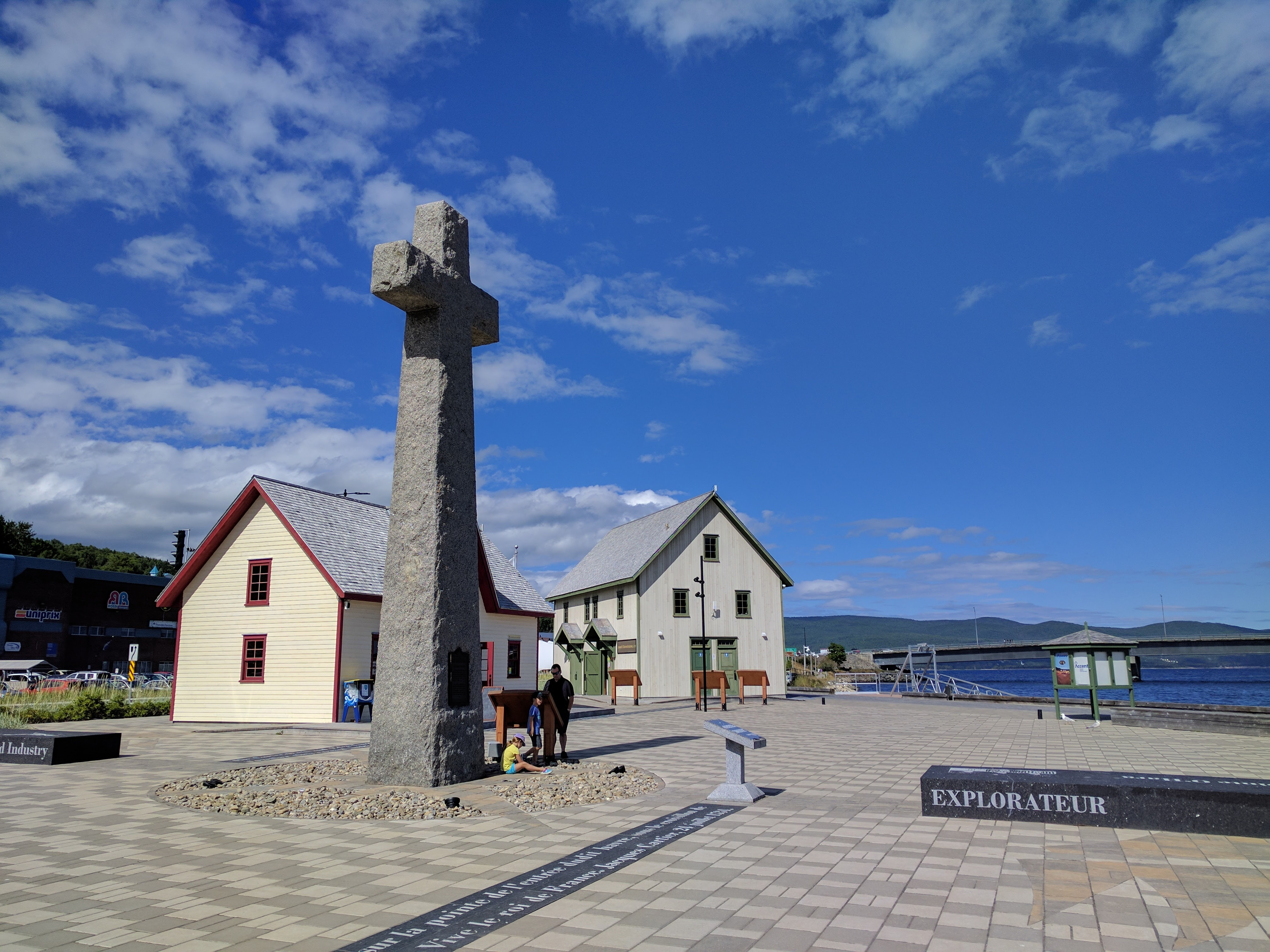
The Cross of Gaspé

In 1934, the Canadian government commissioned the installation of a monolithic granite cross in Gaspé, for the 400th anniversary of the arrival of Jacques Cartier in Gaspé as of July 24, 1534. This 32-foot (9.8 m) high monolithic cross had been cut from a block of gray granite extracted from the stone quarry of Augustus Dumas, in Rivière-à-Pierre in the Portneuf region, on North Shore of the Saint Lawrence River. The Cross of Gaspé weighs more than 42 tons and was transported by two railcars of the Canadian National Railway from Rivière-à-Pierre. The cross was carried on a coaster to the Gaspé wharf. The cross was erected on its base using a rail system of pulleys and cables, driven by horses. The original craftsmen would be listed at the top of the cross. This cross is the largest monolithic granite cross crafted in Canada.

A commemorative plaque located at the foot of the Cross in Gaspé was inaugurated on August 23, 2009, in memory of artisans from Rivière-à-Pierre who extracted and cut the block of granite. A replica of the Cross of Gaspé was crafted by Rivière-à-Pierre craftsmen and erected in the heart of the village of Rivière-à-Pierre. That granite cross is half the height of the original cross.

== Government ==
List of former mayors:

- Arthur Drolet (–2003)
- François Roussy (2003–2013)
- Daniel Côté (2013–present)

== Infrastructure ==
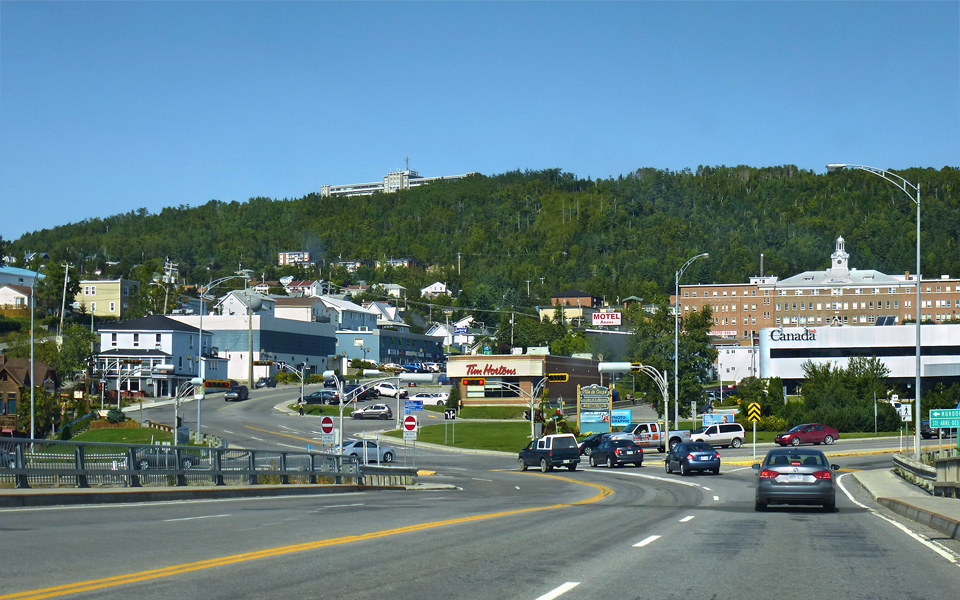
Quebec Route 132 in Gaspé

Gaspé is accessible by automobile or Orléans Express bus service via Quebec Route 132, and the Michel-Pouliot Gaspé Airport.

The town is also accessible by Quebec Route 198 that passes through the interior of the peninsula. Select travellers can also access the town during the winter via one of the many snowmobile trails that run through the interior and connect with many other towns on the northern and southern coasts of the peninsula. In the summer the same trails are open to all-terrain vehicle travellers as well.

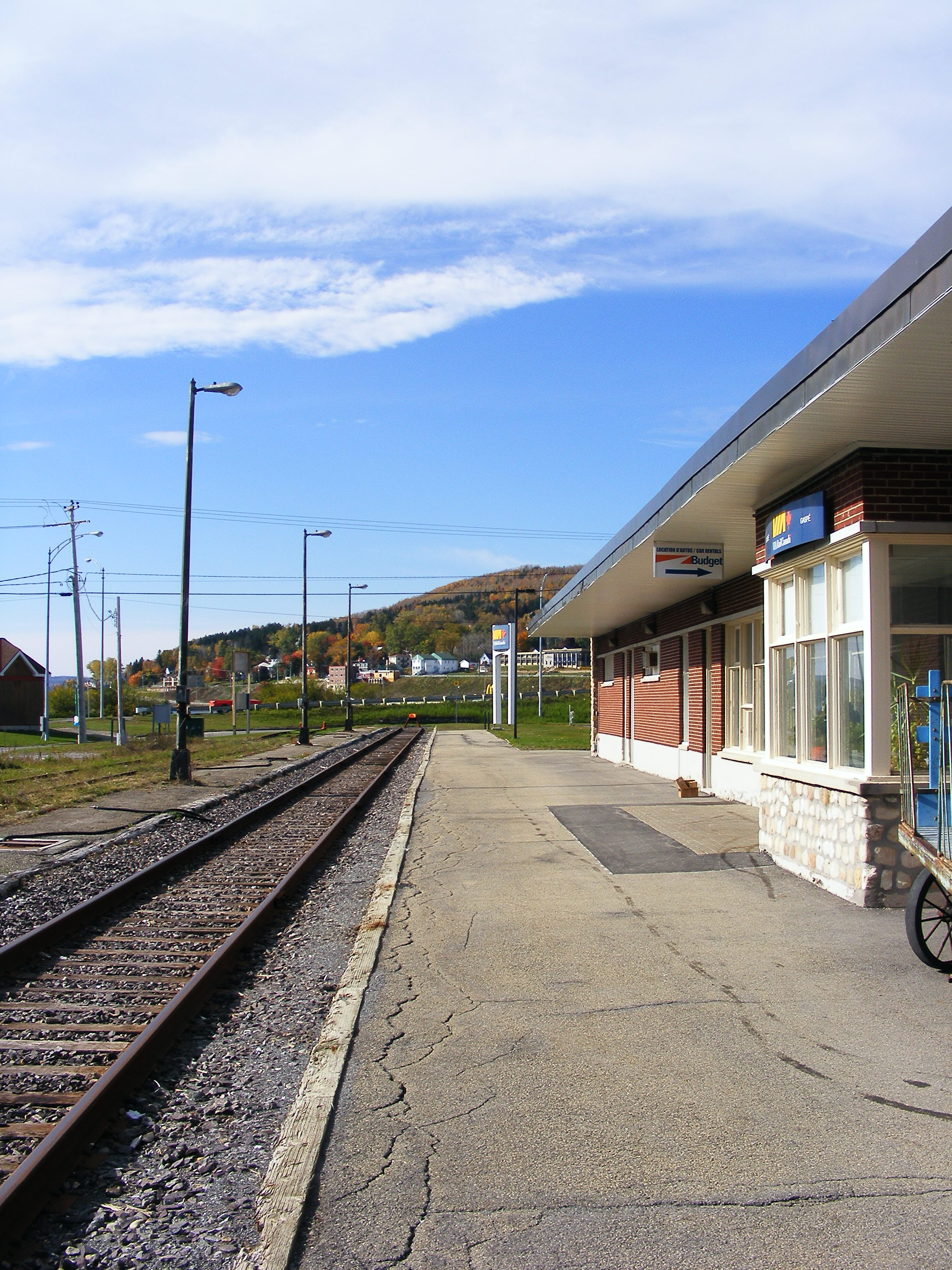
Via Rail train station in Gaspé

Via Rail's Montreal–Gaspé train was terminated due to unsafe trackage sometime in 2013. The VIA Rail Train to Gaspé was being turned in New Carlisle, 167 kilometres (104 mi) west of Gaspé. Via was offering bus service between New Carlisle and Gaspé. The line was undergoing repairs since December 2011. In March 2026, Mathieu Paquette, interim president of VIA Rail, announced that the company was evaluating the possibility of a partial and incremental return of passenger train services to Gaspé.

The Port of Gaspé has a two-sided wharf; on the one, it measures 175 metres (574 ft), with a depth of 8 metres (26 ft), and on the other measures 180 metres (590 ft) with a depth of 10 metres (33 ft). The Port of Gaspé is accessible year-round with the occasional help of an icebreaker.

Its near neighbour Chandler is a port of call for Le Vacancier, a ferry which links Montréal to the Îles-de-la-Madeleine.

== Education ==
Centre des services scolaire des Chic-Chocs operates Francophone schools.

- École secondaire Antoine-Roy
- École secondaire C.-E.-Pouliot
- École Aux Quatre-Vents
- École Notre-Dame-de-Liesse
- École Notre-Dame-du-Sacré-Cœur
- École Saint-Joseph-Alban
- École Saint-Paul
- École Saint-Rosaire et de la Découverte

Eastern Shores School Board operates Anglophone schools. It is zoned to Gaspé Polyvalent School and Gaspé Elementary School.

== Sister cities ==
Gaspé is twinned with:

- Puerto Montt, Chile (2005)
- Saint-Malo, France (2009)

== See also ==
- Gaspé (electoral district)
- List of anglophone communities in Quebec
- List of cities in Quebec
