= Cap Gaspé =

Headland in Quebec

- Cape
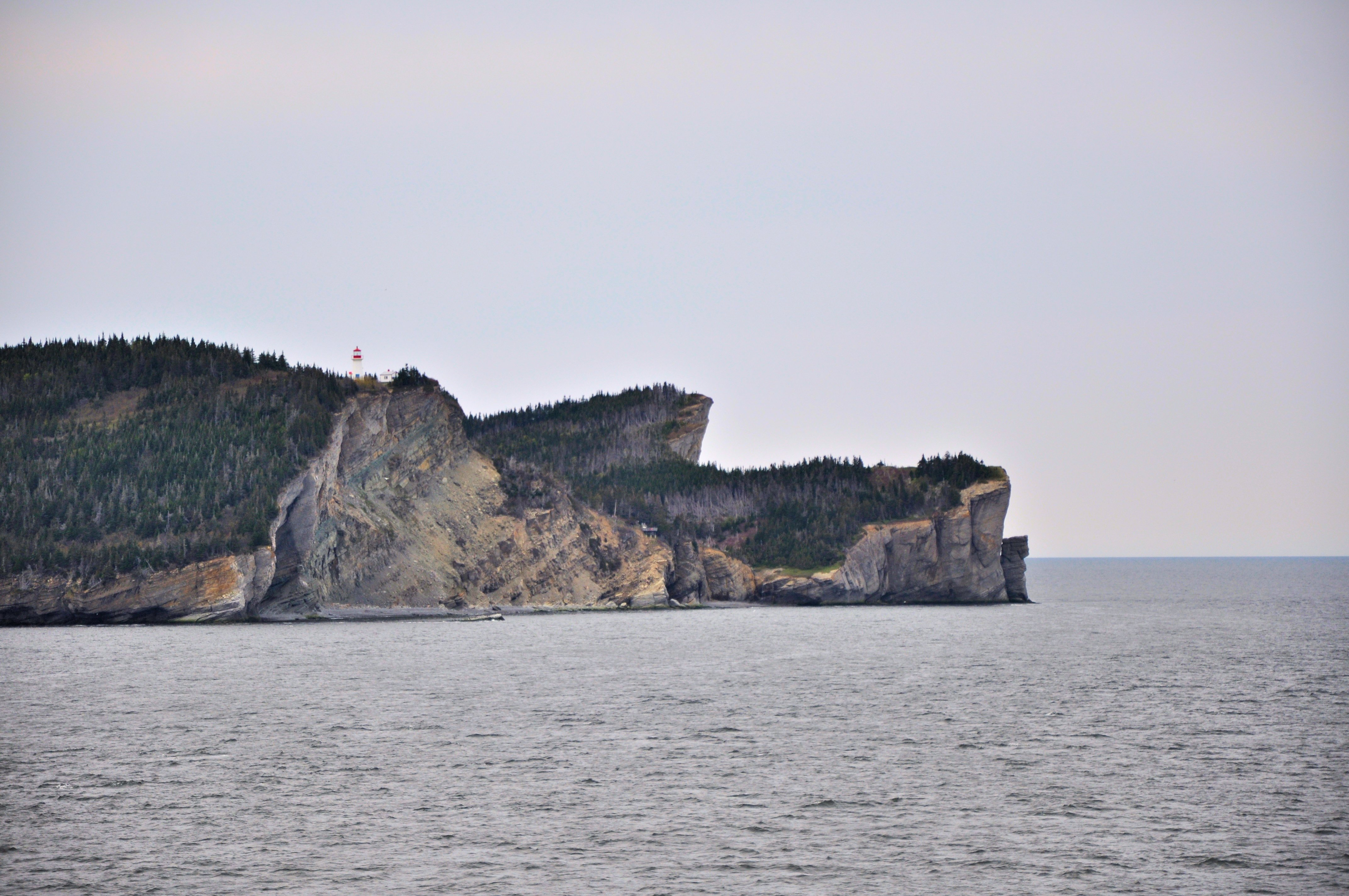
- Cap Gaspé as viewed from the west

- Location within Quebec
- Coordinates: 48°45′07″N 64°09′48″W
- Location: Gaspé Peninsula, Quebec
- Topo map: NTS 22A16 Gaspé

Cap Gaspé is a headland at the eastern extremity of the Gaspé Peninsula in the Canadian province of Quebec. It is within Forillon National Park. It is also the end point of the International Appalachian Trail.
