= Rochers aux Oiseaux =

Migratory bird sanctuary in Canada

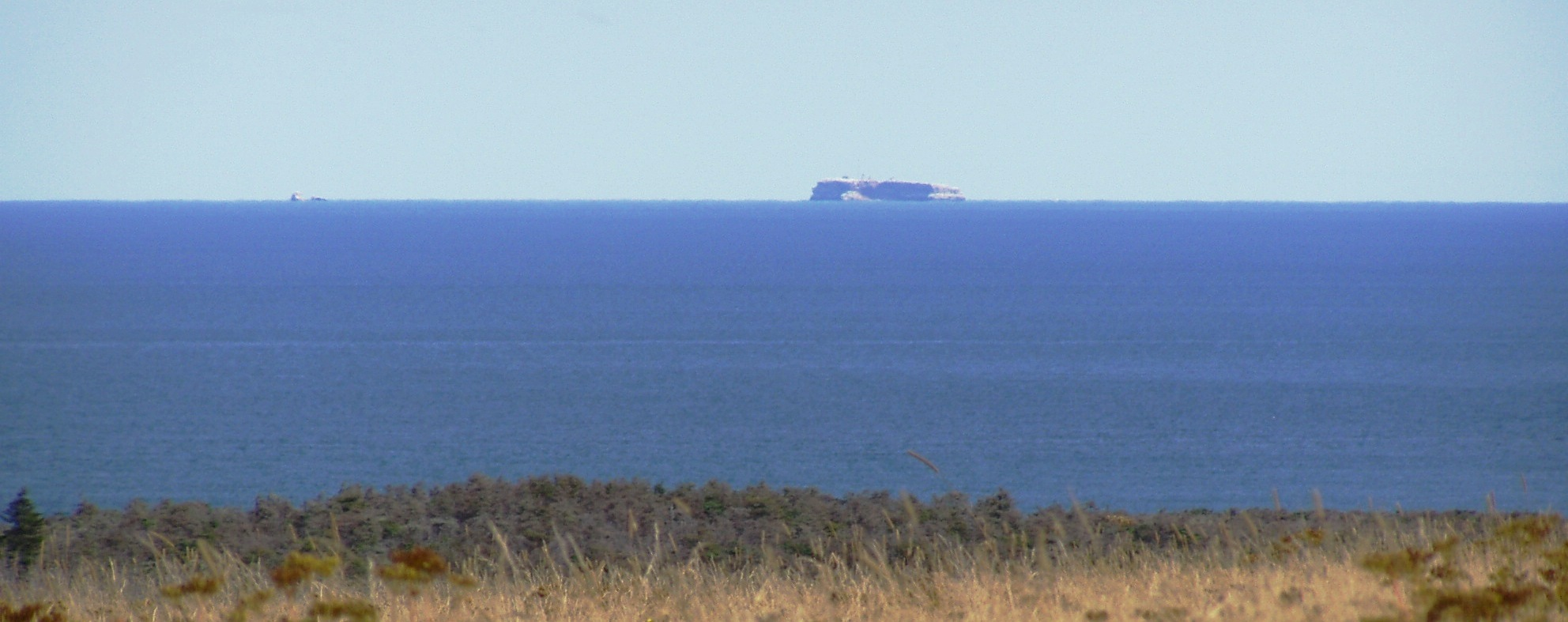
- View of Rochers aux Oiseaux from Brion Island, with Rocher aux Oiseaux (right) and Rocher aux Margaulx (left).

- Location within Canada Location within Quebec

Geography
- Location: Gulf of St. Lawrence (Atlantic Ocean)
- Coordinates: 47°50′35″N 61°09′25″W
- Archipelago: Magdalen Islands
- Total islands: 2
- Major islands: Rocher aux Oiseaux
- Area: 0.04 km^{2} (0.015 sq mi)
- Highest point: unnamed (30m above Rocher aux Oiseaux)

Administration
- Canada
- Province: Quebec
- Administrative region: Gaspésie–Îles-de-la-Madeleine
- Local municipality: Grosse-Île

Demographics
- Population: 0

Additional information
- Time zone: UTC-4
- Discovered on June 25, 1534 by Europeans and several hundreds of years earlier by the Mi'kmaq; It is nowadays considered as a Bird sanctuary

The Rochers aux Oiseaux (French pronunciation: [ʁɔʃe oz‿wazo], Bird Rocks) are an uninhabited archipelago in Quebec, Canada, located in the Gulf of St. Lawrence off the Magdalen Islands. The islands and the surrounding marine area are a migratory bird sanctuary known as the Rochers-aux-Oiseaux Bird Sanctuary, owned by the Canadian Coast Guard and home to a large colony of Northern gannets.

This four-hectare, thirty-metre-high sandstone boulder is reputed to be a veritable ship's graveyard, which encouraged the installation of a lighthouse in 1870. Many of its keepers lost their lives in accidents at work or while hunting seals. The lighthouse was finally automated in 1988, leaving the island inhabited only by seabirds.

- Bird Rock is 300 m long by 150 m wide and 30 m high, forms a kind of red sandstone citadel that is practically inaccessible but inhabited by thousands of birds and a lighthouse that is now automated.
- Margaulx rock is 1.3 km to the northwest, actually identifies three small cays.
Bird Rocks Migratory Bird Sanctuary

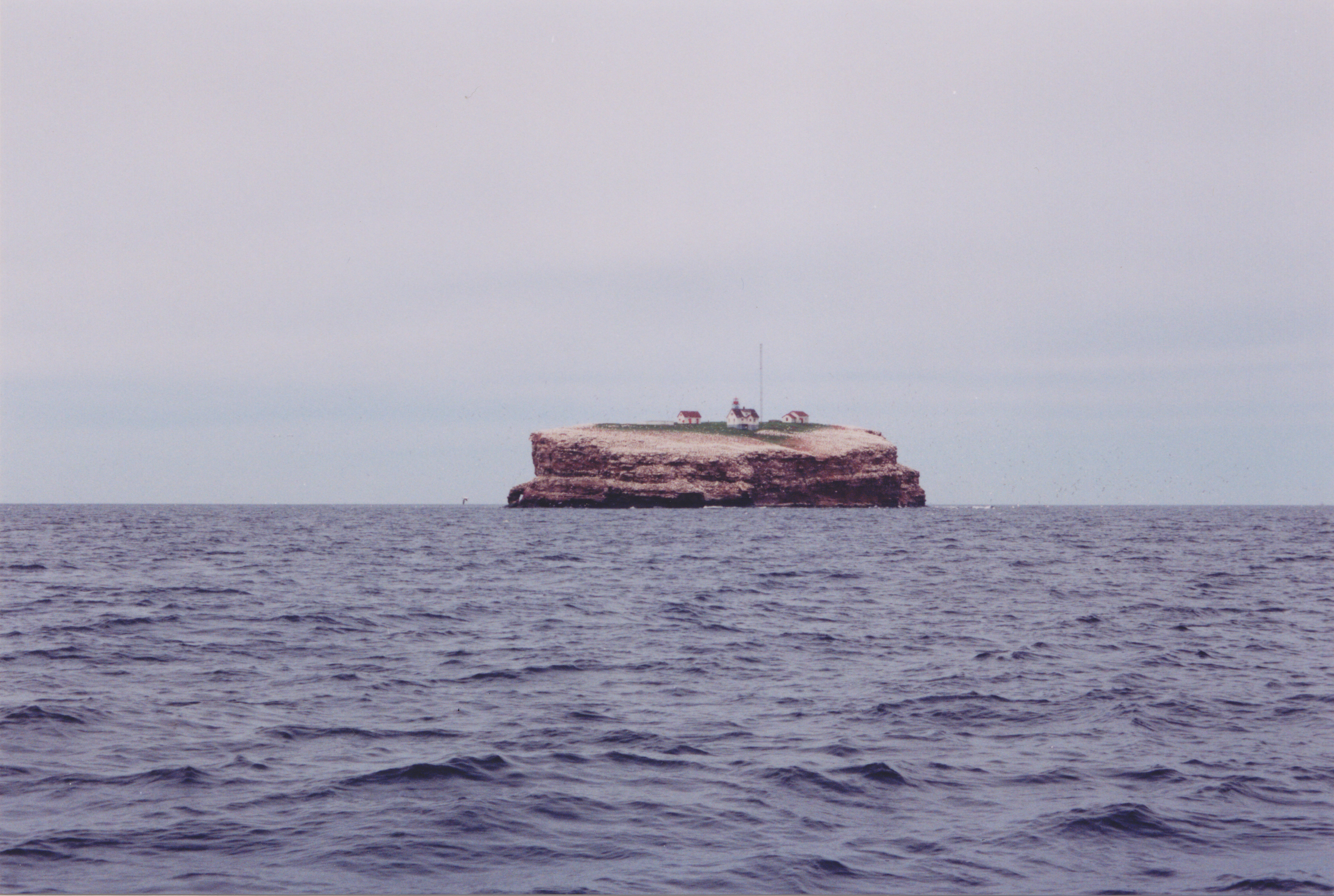
Lighthouse, keepers' house and outbuildings

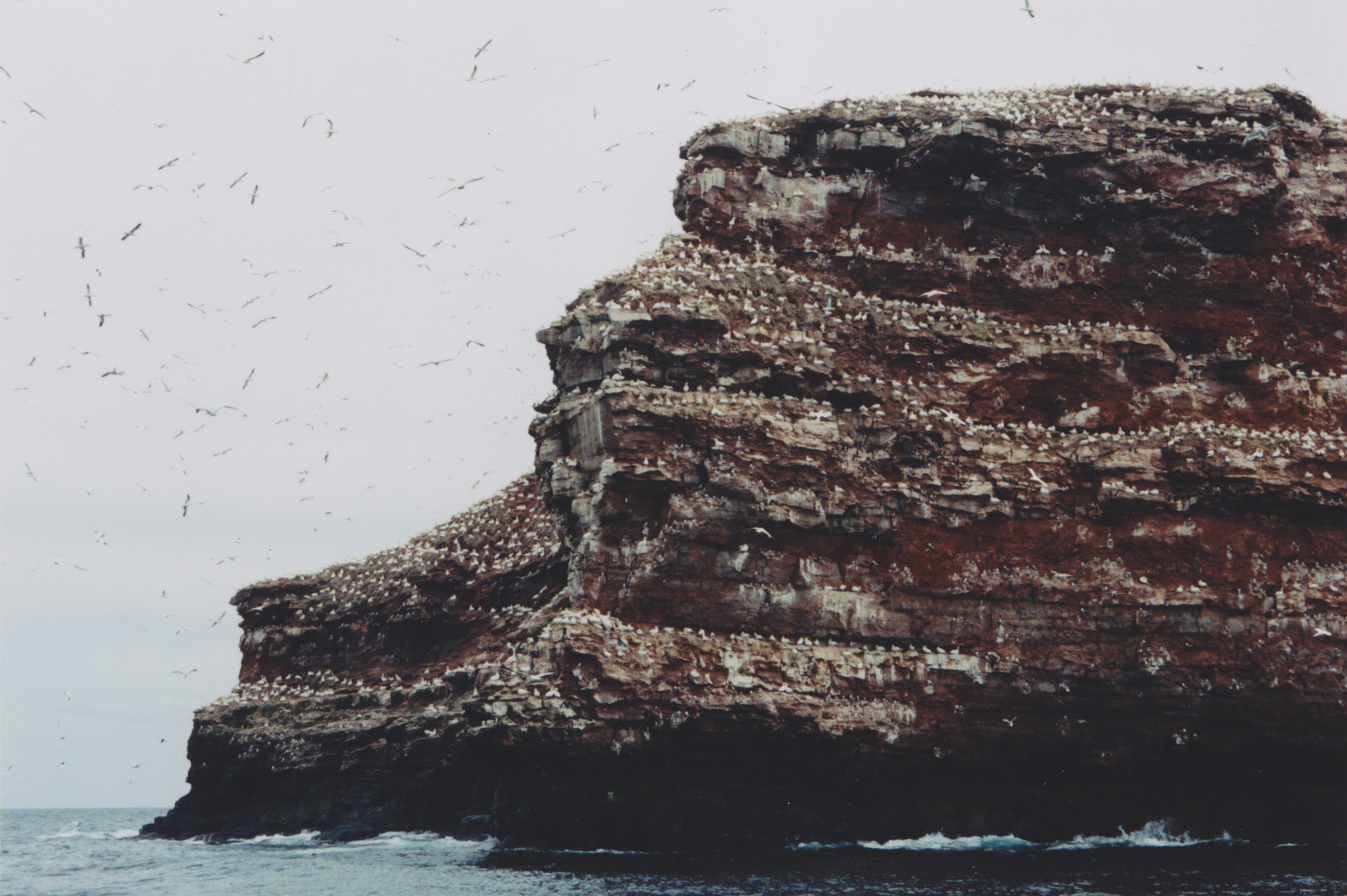
Red sandnestone citadel

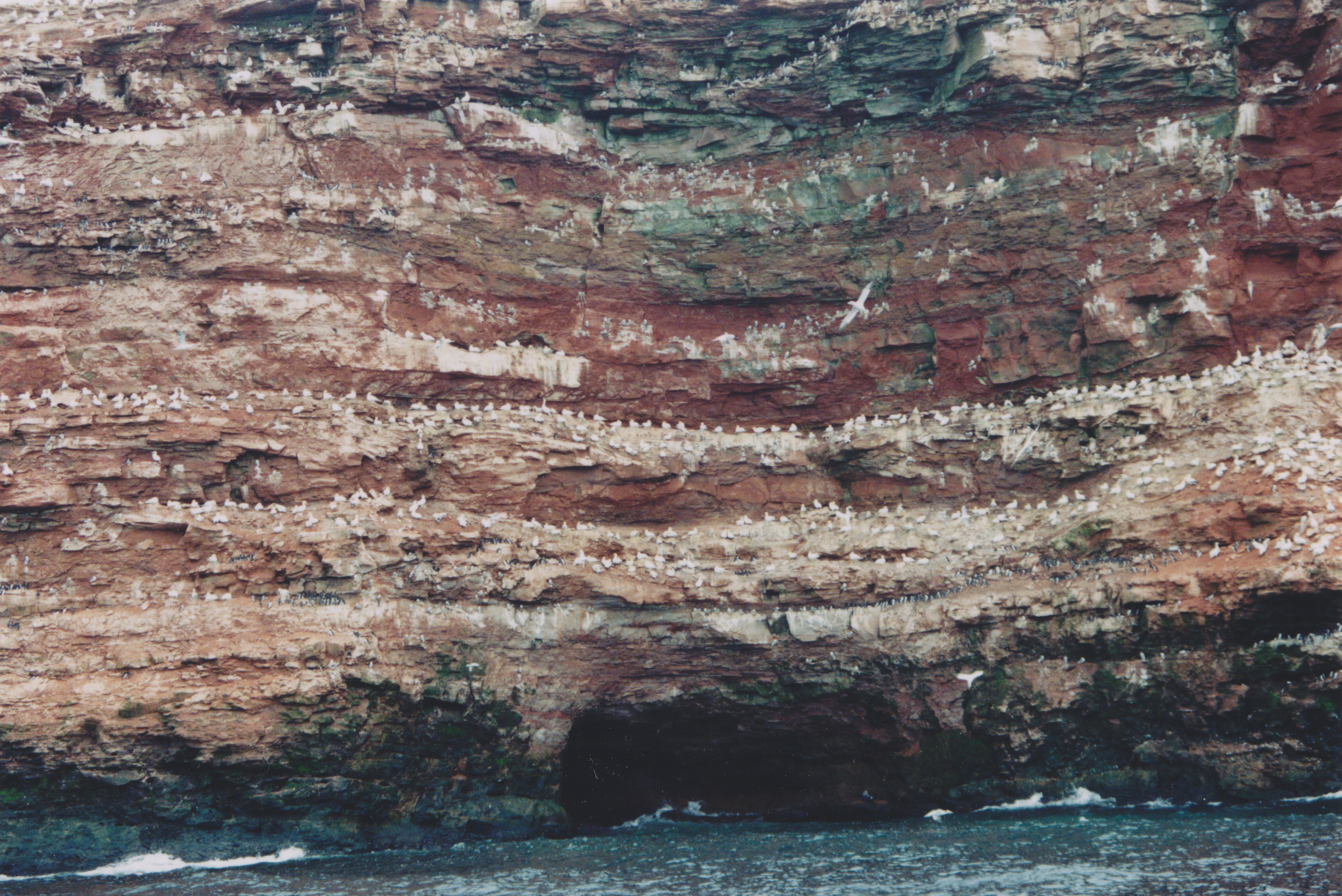
Support one of the six Northern Gannet Colonies in North America

== Toponymy ==
The Rochers aux Oiseaux is an archipelago consisting of the Rocher aux Oiseaux itself and the Rochers aux Margaulx. The archipelago and the surrounding maritime zone are a refuge for migratory birds, known as the "Rochers-aux-Oiseaux Bird Sanctuary". Their names derive from the large number of birds that nest there, notably the gannets, known as "margaulx" at the time of their discovery in 1534. In English, the archipelago is called Bird Rocks, the main island Bird Rock and the ornithological reserve Rochers-aux-Oiseaux Migratory Bird Sanctuary.

== Geography ==
=== Location ===
The Rochers aux Oiseaux are located in eastern Canada and Quebec, in the Gulf of St. Lawrence, 32 kilometers northeast of the northern tip of the Magdalen Islands. Brion Island lies to the west and Newfoundland to the east. This maritime zone is frequented by ships using the Cabot Strait between the Gulf of St. Lawrence and the Atlantic Ocean.

Administratively, the Rochers aux Oiseaux are part of the local municipality of Grosse-Île in the Gaspésie-Îles-de-la-Madeleine, one of the administrative regions that make up Quebec.

=== Topography ===
The Rochers aux Oiseaux are made up of an island, the Rocher aux Oiseaux, and three rocks located just over a kilometre to the northwest, the Rochers aux Margaulx. Rocher aux Oiseaux is a small, roughly circular island less than 300 meters in diameter and four hectares (0.04 km2) in area. The island consists of a horizontal plateau entirely surrounded by thirty-metre-high cliffs. These cliffs are retreating under the effect of sea erosion, having caused the island to lose half its surface area in 150 years. This erosion is not held back by the relatively soft Permian red sandstone and siltstone that underlie the Rocher aux Oiseaux and Rochers aux Margaulx.

=== Climate ===
The oceanic climate of Rochers aux Oiseaux is typical of that of the Magdalen Islands. Summers are warm, with an average temperature of 13 °C, and winters are relatively mild for the region, with an average of −3.5 °C. Average annual precipitation is between 900 and 1,000 millimeters.

=== Wildlife ===
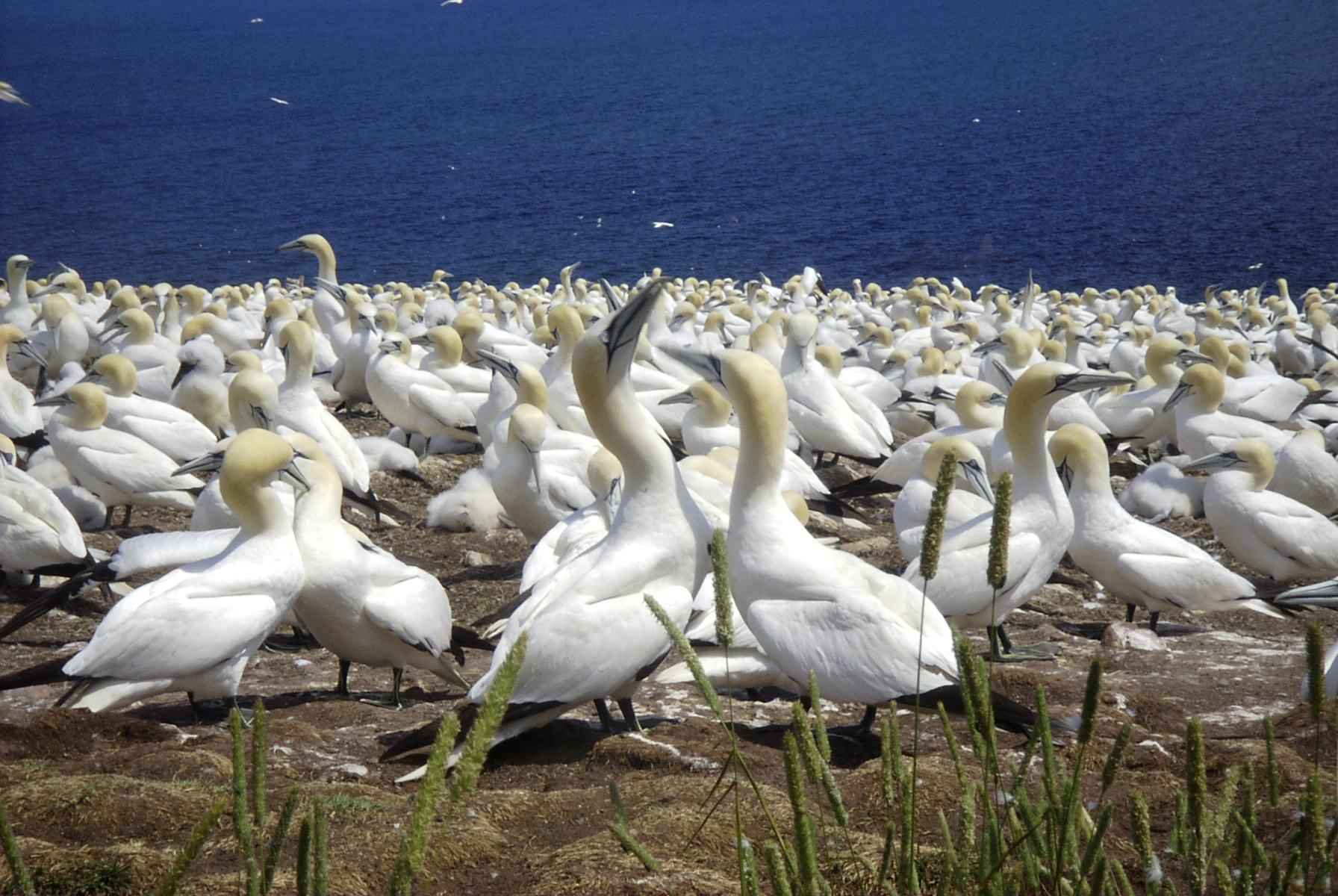
Northern gannet colony on Bonaventure Island, Quebec.

The Rochers aux Oiseaux are home to one of North America's six largest colonies of Northern gannets (Morus bassanus), with 17% of the continent's population of this species, as well as a large colony of Black-legged kittiwakes (Rissa tridactyla), with 1% of the Western Atlantic Ocean population. In addition to these two species, Razorbills (Alca torda), Common murres (Uria aalge), Thick-billed murres (Uria lomvia) and Atlantic puffins (Fratercula arctica) can be found in significant numbers. There are also Black guillemots (Cepphus grylle), American herring gull (Larus smithsonianus), Great black-backed gulls (Larus marinus) and Leach's Storm-Petrels (Oceanodroma leucorhoa). Among the species no longer nesting on the islands is the extinct Great auk (Pinguinus impennis).

In addition to birdlife, the lower cliffs of Bird Rock are home to marine mammals such as the Harbour and Grey seals. The shallow waters surrounding the rocks are home to few cetaceans. Harbour porpoise (Phocoena phocoena), white-sided dolphin (Lagenorhynchus acutus), pilot whale (Globicephala melas) and minke whale (Balaenoptera acutorostrata) rarely visit.

The waters around the Magdalen Islands are home to around a thousand species of invertebrates and a hundred species of fish. Only a few of these are exploited by man: American lobster (Homarus americanus), snow crab (Chionoecetes opilio), redfish (Sebastes sp.), Atlantic cod (Gadus morhua), American plaice (Hippoglossoides platessoides), Atlantic mackerel (Scomber scombrus), Atlantic herring (Clupea harengus) and giant scallop (Placopecten magellanicus).

=== Flora ===
The archipelago's geology and climate do not allow for significant vegetation development. The Rochers aux Margaulx are totally devoid of vegetation, while the Rocher aux Oiseaux is covered with herbaceous plants on 70% of its surface, the rest being devoid of vegetation. The flora of the Rocher aux Oiseaux is very poor, with only around twenty species. The most common species are yarrow (Achillea millefolium), shepherd's purse (Capsella bursa-pastoris), foxtail barley (Hordeum jubatum) and sea plantain (Plantago maritima).

Around a hundred species of algae and kelp meadows can be found in waters less than twelve meters deep.

== History ==
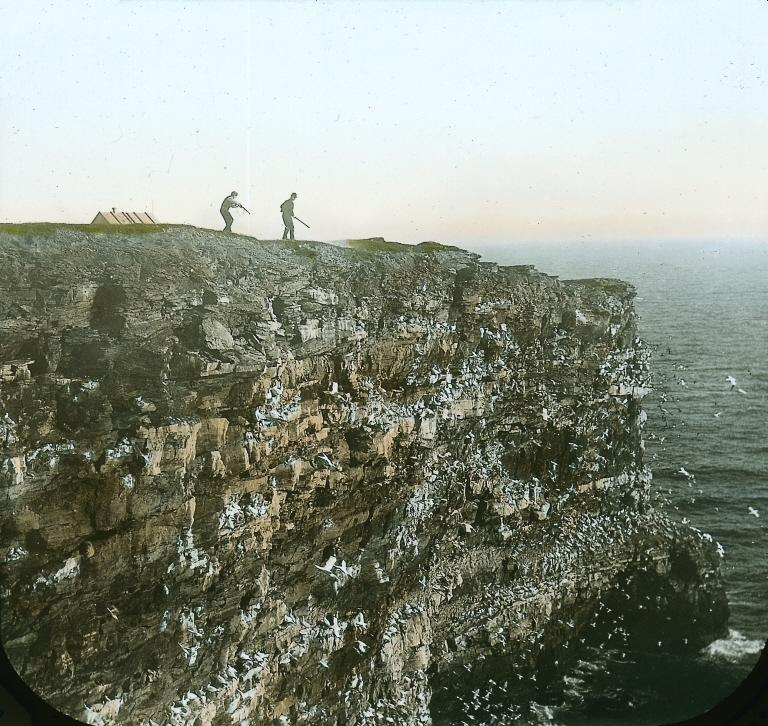
Bird Rock, circa 1910

As with the rest of the Magdalen Islands archipelago, the Rochers aux Oiseaux were visited by the Mi'kmaq for fishing and seal hunting.

The first European to sight the Rochers aux Oiseaux was French navigator Jacques Cartier on June 25, 1534. He recorded his discovery of these islands under the name "isles de Margaulx", after the gannets found there, known as "margaulx" at the time. The current name appeared at an unknown date, but the archipelago was already called "Rochers aux Oiseaux" in 1919 by Brother Marie-Victorin.

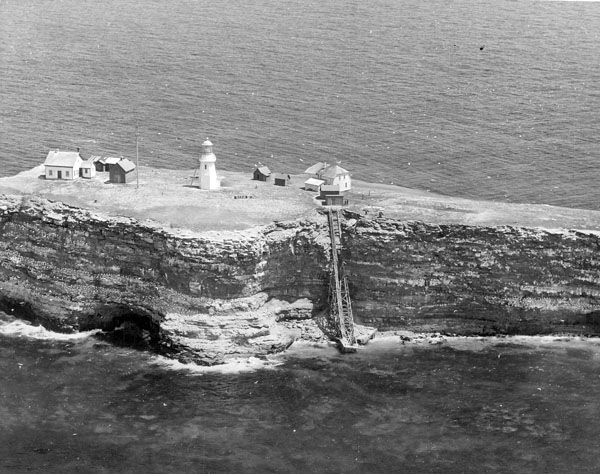
Aerial view of Rocher aux Oiseaux in 1943 with its various buildings, including the Rocher-aux-Oiseaux lighthouse.

The Magdalen Islands have recorded over 400 shipwrecks in four centuries. The Rochers aux Oiseaux is the closest island in the archipelago to the Laurentian Channel, making it an ideal site for a lighthouse. In 1860, John Page, an engineer with the Department of Public Works, proposed the construction of a lighthouse on the rock, noting that the project would be one of the most difficult the department would ever undertake. The lighthouse and adjoining buildings were built in 1870. Materials were transported from a path carved into the rock. The first lighthouse was a 15.2-metre-high wooden building. It was rebuilt in 1887 to a height of just 11.9 metres. Access to the lighthouse was by boat and a 147-step staircase on the north side of the rock.

Due to its isolation and difficult access, the lighthouse was considered dangerous. The first lighthouse keeper, a certain Guitté, is said to have predicted that "no keeper would be able to keep this lighthouse for more than ten years without tragedy". He was replaced after two years, having lapsed into madness. Several other keepers of this lighthouse came to tragic ends. The second keeper, Peter (or Patrick) Whalen, died with his son when a sudden storm overturned his boat in 1880, while he was out seal hunting. In 1881, the fog cannon explosion killed the third keeper, Charles Chiasson, as well as his son and a visitor, Paul Chenell.

The fourth keeper, Télesphore Turbide, operated the lighthouse for fifteen accident-free years, until one day in 1896, when he lost a hand in the fog cannon, putting an end to his career. The interim keeper, Charles Turbide, died the following spring while seal hunting with his two companions, in an accident similar to that of 1880. He was replaced by Pierre Bourque, who operated the lighthouse until 1905. His son, Wilfrid Bourque, succeeded him, but was also involved in a seal-hunting accident in 1911. He was replaced by his nephew, Elphège Bourque, who ran the lighthouse for a further ten years. In 1922, poor water quality made him and his two assistants ill. They died of poisoning. The lighthouse never suffered another major accident. In 1961, the last family living on the rock left. The staircase and ladder were abandoned, and access to the lighthouse was replaced by the use of a helicopter, enabling the keepers to take turns every 28 days. It was finally automated in 1988.

The protection of the Rochers aux Oiseaux began on March 29, 1919, making it the oldest migratory bird sanctuary in Canada, along with the Île Bonaventure and Rocher Percé bird sanctuaries, the Last Mountain Lake bird sanctuary having been created earlier but under a different status. It was also the first protected area created under the Migratory Birds Treaty of 1917, and the first marine protected area in Canada.

== Protection ==
Rochers aux Oiseaux Bird sanctuary
- IUCN category Ia (strict nature reserve)
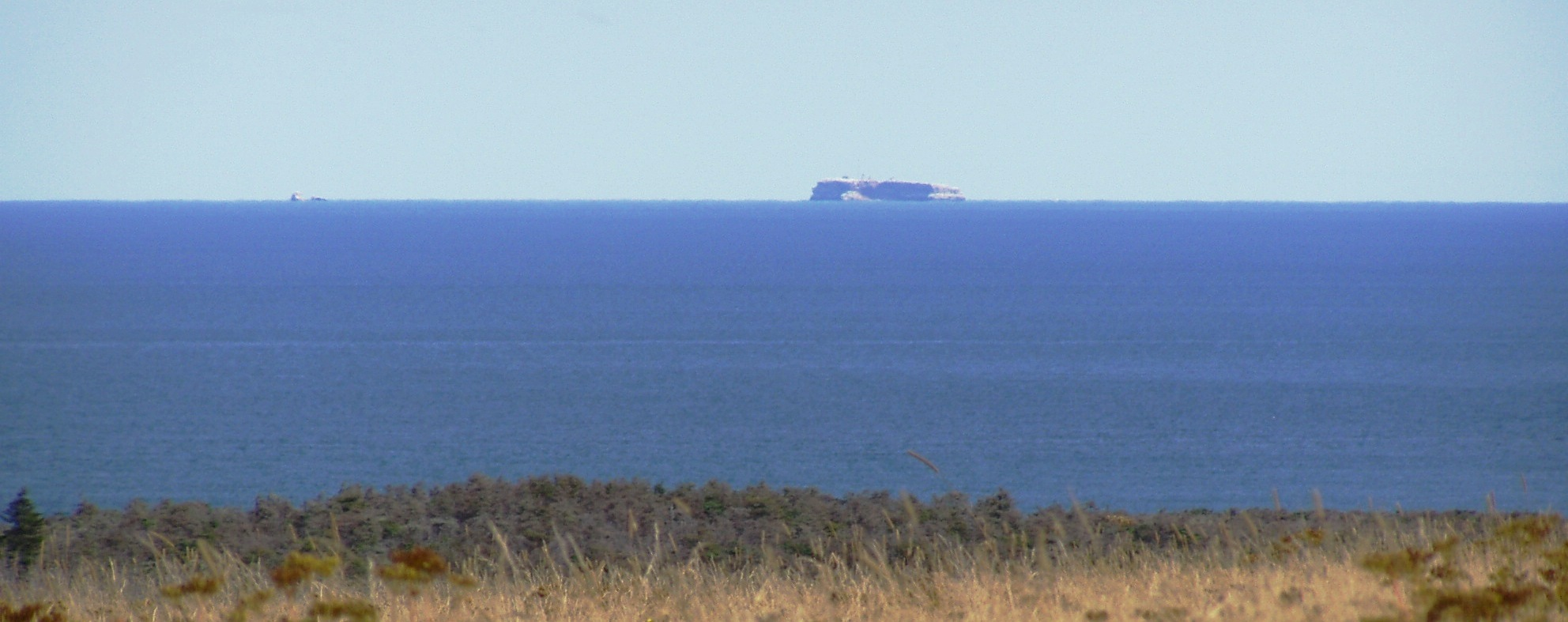
- Location: Canada; Province of Quebec; Gaspésie–Îles-de-la-Madeleine; Equivalent territory of Urban agglomeration of Les Îles-de-la-Madeleine; Grosse-Île
- Area: 6.5 square kilometres (70,000,000 ft^{2})
- Established: March 29, 1919 as a Marine protected area
- Governing body: Canadian Wildlife Service
- Website: https://www.canada.ca/fr/environnement-changement-climatique/services/refuges-oiseaux-migrateurs/ensemble/rochers-aux-oiseaux.html

The Rochers aux Oiseaux bird sanctuary is a Canadian protected area, an Important Bird Area (IBA) and one of 28 migratory bird sanctuaries in Quebec. The mission of this protected area, which includes the archipelago's four hectares of land and the 645-hectare maritime zone around the rocks (a total of 649 ha), is to preserve an important nesting site for the Northern gannet. Rocher aux Oiseaux is also recognized as a "bird colony on an island or peninsula" by the Quebec government, with a surface area of 5.26 hectares.

== Administration and tourism ==
The Rochers aux Oiseaux are owned by the Department of Fisheries and Oceans Canada, which operates a lighthouse on the Rocher aux Oiseaux. The archipelago has been designated a Migratory Bird Sanctuary following an interdepartmental agreement with the Canadian Wildlife Service, the organization responsible for its protection.

The Rochers aux Oiseaux themselves are inaccessible to tourists. However, it is possible to get there by boat to observe the islands and bird colonies from the sea.

== Popular culture ==
The main island, the Rocher aux Oiseaux, with its isolation and imposing shape, seems to hold a certain fascination for Madelinots. Singer Georges Langford wrote a song entitled "Le Rocher-aux-Oiseaux" for an album released in 2003, recounting the loneliness of a lighthouse keeper and his family "12 miles from nowhere". In 1999, novelist Gervais Pomerleau published a novel, Rocher-aux-oiseaux, the fifth volume in the cycle Les Chevaucheurs de vague, which focused on the tragic fate of the lighthouse keepers.

== See also ==
- Northern gannet
- List of Migratory Bird Sanctuaries of Canada
- Grosse-Île, Quebec
- Magdalen Islands
- Gulf of St. Lawrence

== Bibliography ==
- Clark, Byron (2006). I Kept the Light Still Burning Sir. ISBN 0-9687521-1-X.
- Gagnon, Marc (1998). Bilan régional Îles-de-la-Madeleine: Zone d’intervention prioritaire 21 (PDF) (in French). Environnement Canada - région du Québec.
