= Magdalen Islands =

Archipelago of Quebec, Canada

The Magdalen Islands
Native name: Menagoesenog
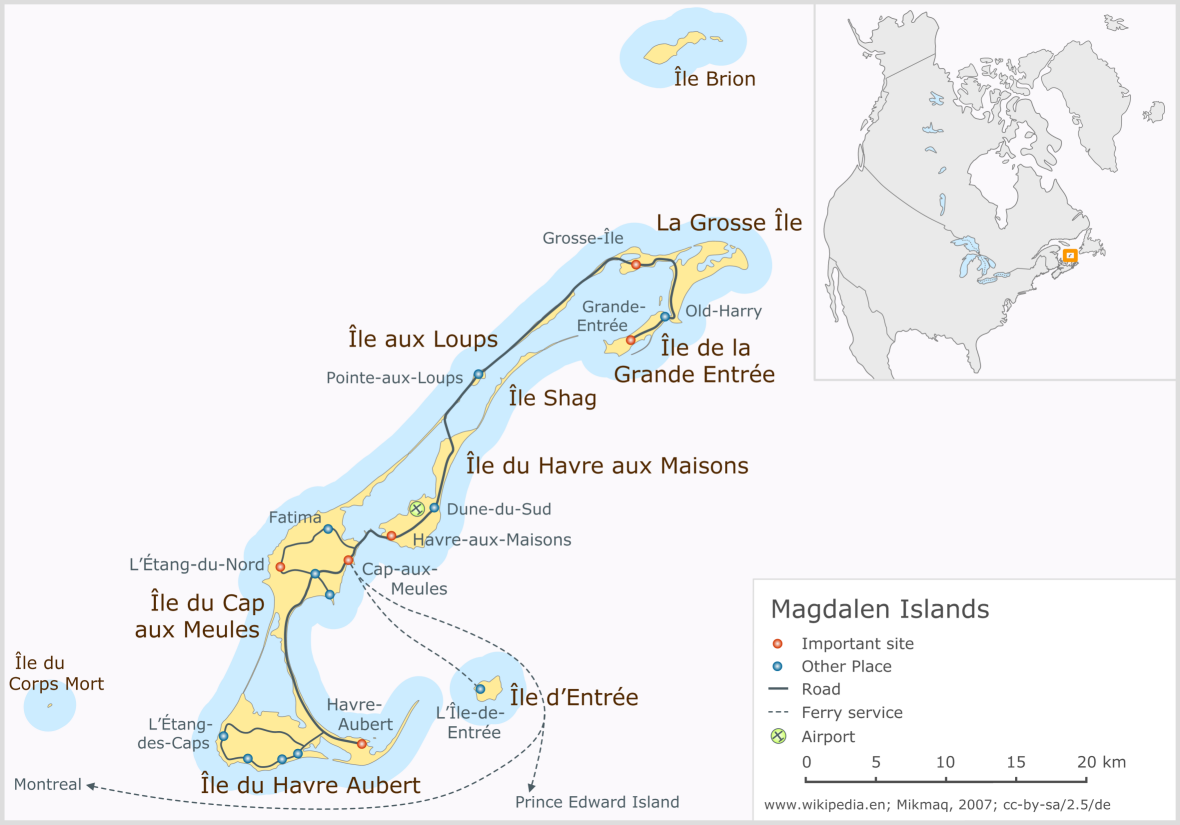
- The Magdalen Islands
- Interactive map of The Magdalen Islands

Geography
- Location: Gulf of Saint Lawrence
- Coordinates: 47°26′54″N 61°45′08″W
- Area: 205.53 km^{2} (79.36 sq mi)

Administration
- Canada
- Province: Quebec

Demographics
- Population: 12,781 (2011)
- Pop. density: 62.2/km^{2} (161.1/sq mi)

Additional information
- Time zone: AST (UTC−4)
  - Summer (DST): ADT (UTC−3)
- Area code: 418, 581

The Magdalen Islands (French: Îles de la Madeleine, pronounced [il də la madlɛn]) are a Canadian archipelago in the Gulf of St. Lawrence. Since 2005, the 12-island archipelago is divided into two municipalities: the majority-francophone Municipality of Îles-de-la-Madeleine and the majority-anglophone Municipality of Grosse-Île, in the Gaspésie–Îles-de-la-Madeleine region, Quebec.

== Geography ==
Approximately 126 kilometres (78 mi) in combined area, they form a string of islands and beaches in the southeastern part of the Gulf of St. Lawrence.

The rocks that make up the island massifs are of three kinds: horizontal and soft sandstones, of a blood-red color, which give the archipelago a distinctive character. These red sandstones are juxtaposed with harder, grey sandstones, which also form cliffs in some places. Both sandstones were formed in the Permian period when the island was a desert, and in 2026 were found to preserve fossils of plants and tracks and burrows of burrowing animals.

Finally, volcanic actions created rounded, symmetrical domes like breasts, which were given the name of Demoiselles (or "young ladies"), though this is disputed. Where volcanic effusions have come into contact with sandstones, large masses of gypsum are found.

A group of seven islands form the central core of the archipelago: Île du Havre Aubert (known locally as Amherst Island), Île du Cap aux Meules (known locally as Grindstone), Île du Havre aux Maisons (known locally as House Harbour), Pointe aux Loups, Grosse Île (home to most of the Islands' English-speaking community), Île d'Entrée (known locally as Entry Island, home to a small English-speaking community) and Île de la Grande-Entrée. These islands are connected together by sand spits or tombolos.

On the outskirts of the main islands are a series of islets and rocks which are remnants of marine erosion; in the lagoons separating these islands, are Île aux Goélands and the surrounding islets near Étang-du-Nord on the south-west coast of Île du Cap aux Meules (Grindstone), Île Rouge and Île Paquet (formerly Île aux Cochons) at the entrance to the lagoon of Havre aux Maisons (House Harbour), Île Shag to the east of the Dune du Sud. In the gulf north of the archipelago, cliffs of the reddish and greyish green sandstone, a few hundred feet high and relatively unmarked by sea erosion, give a fortress-like appearance to Île Brion and the Rochers aux Oiseaux.

Supporting the islands is a series of shoals and reefs that are permanent hazards to maritime navigation. The archipelago has been considered, for more than 400 years, as one of the richest marine regions of Eastern Canada.

A study published in 2011 revealed the impressive wealth of geomorphological and geological heritage on the Magdalen Islands. This study consisted in going back in time to trace the evolution of today's landscape through a network of historical sites, known as geomorphosites. Geomorphosites are a representation of a territory's geodiversity, which in turn refers to the diversity of the abiotic world.

== Coastal dynamics ==
In the Magdalen Islands, the coastal dynamics are amplified by the wind, with waves most often 0.5 to 2 metres (1.6 to 6.6 ft) high breaking on the coast at a rate of four to seven seconds, depending on their height.

Adding up the many bays and indentations, the coastline is inordinately long: 385 kilometres (239 mi) in all, more than 60% of which is sandy beaches, often topped by a dune. The territory is constantly changing, the unconsolidated deposits are expanding at the expense of the rocky cores they connect.

The red sandstone cliffs, the most widespread and friable, are rarely more than 30 metres (98 ft) high. They are subject to rapid erosion (often more than 1 metre, 3 ft 3 in per year) due to the action of frost, ice, waves and sea spray that make numerous openings while undermining their base. Erosion features and shapes such as caves, towers, and corbels.

Diversity

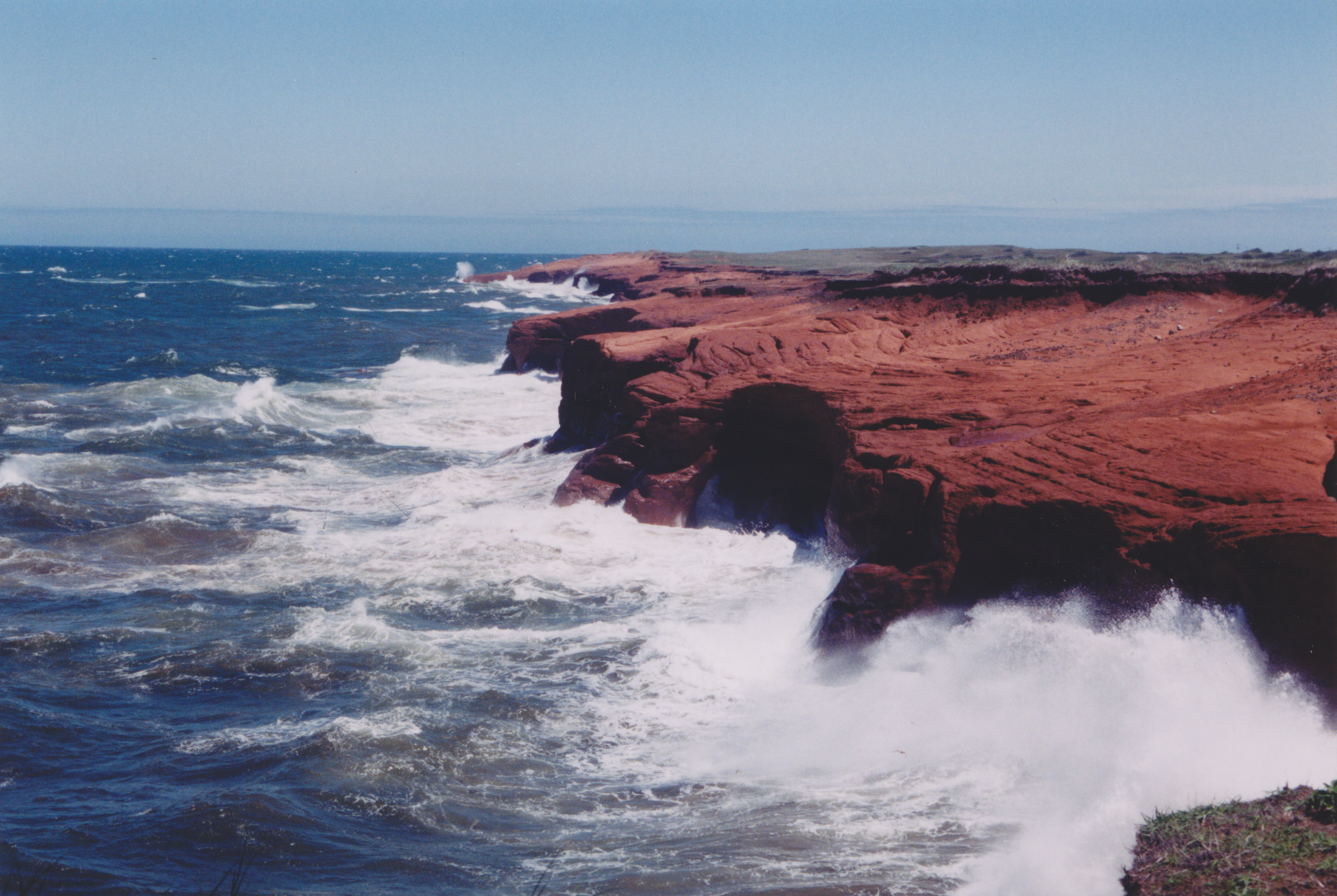
Grindstone, coast between L'Étang-du-Nord and Fatima.

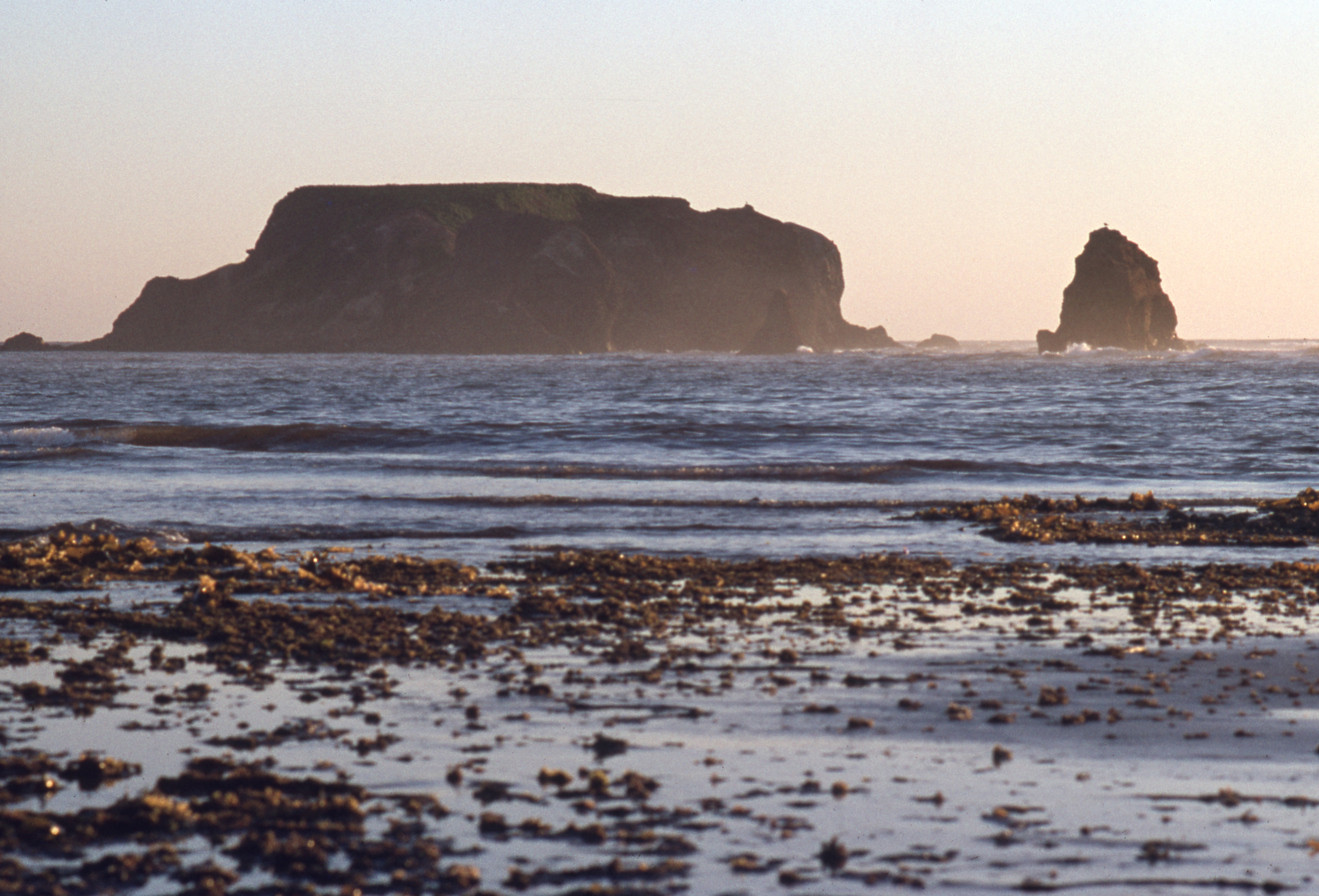
Corps-Mort, uninhabited rock, from the island of Havre-Aubert at low tide.

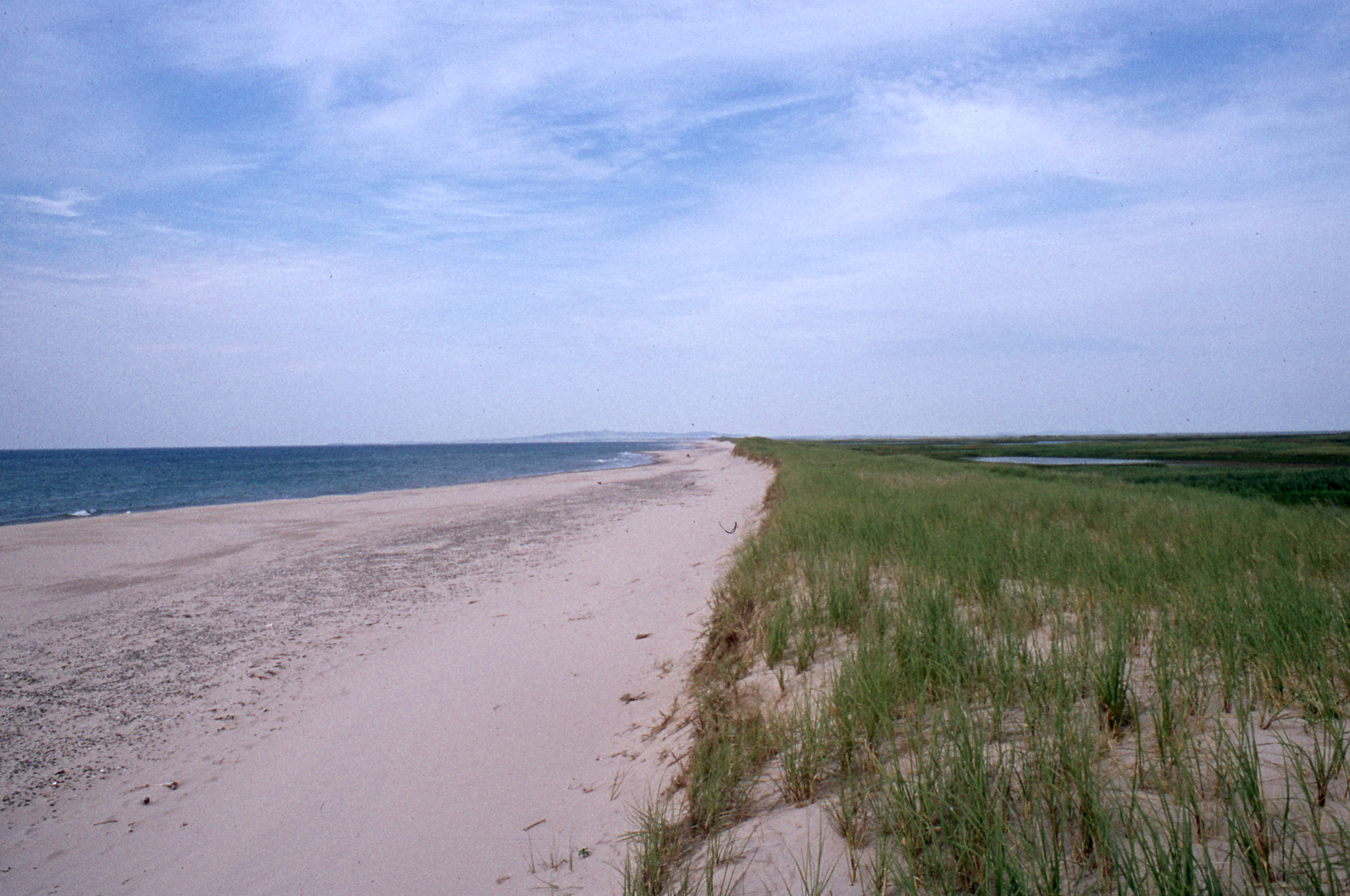
Sandy Hook Dune, a hook-shaped sand spit about six kilometres (3.7 mi), Havre Aubert island

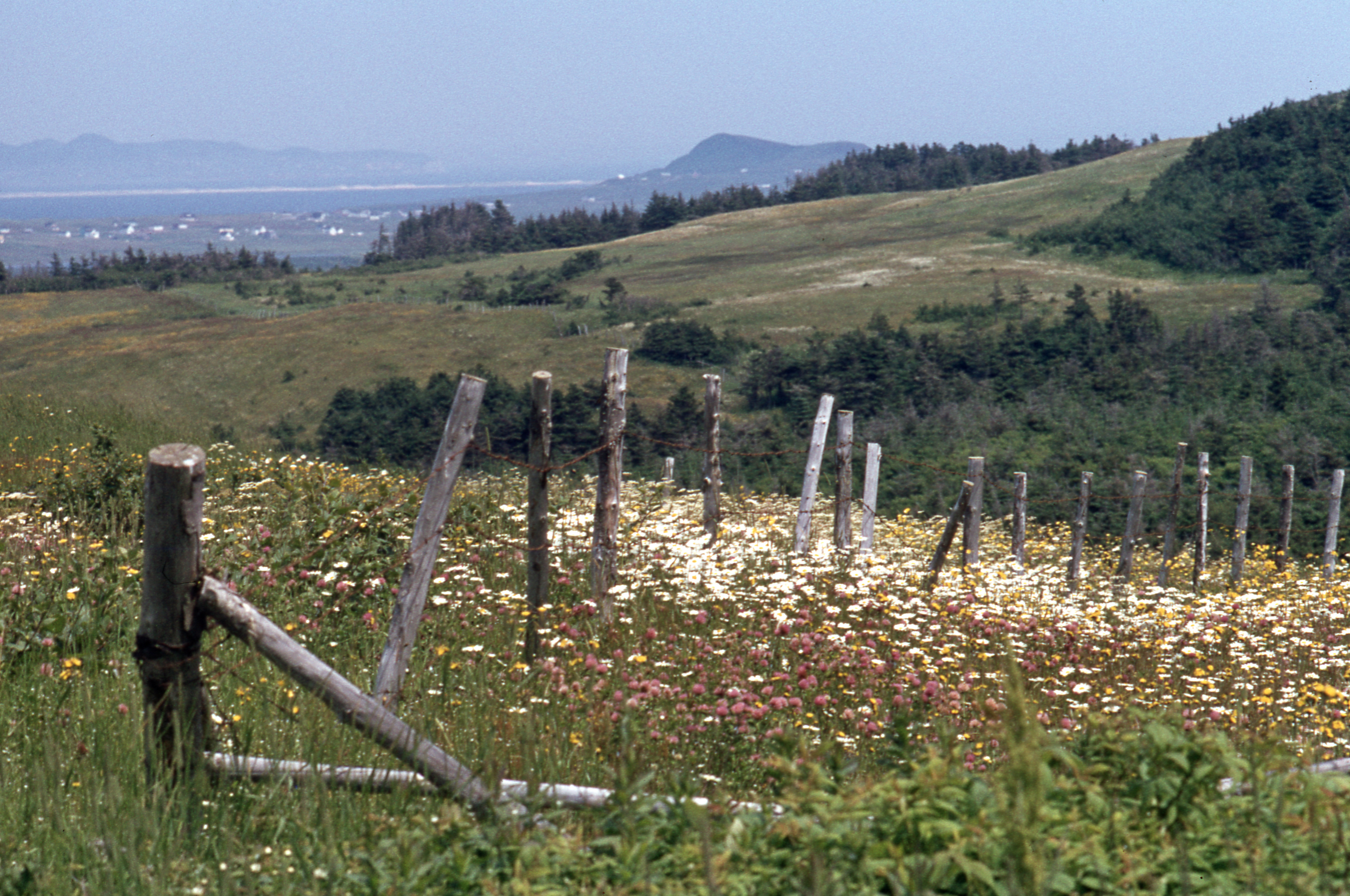
Fatima, Butte du Vent (Hills)

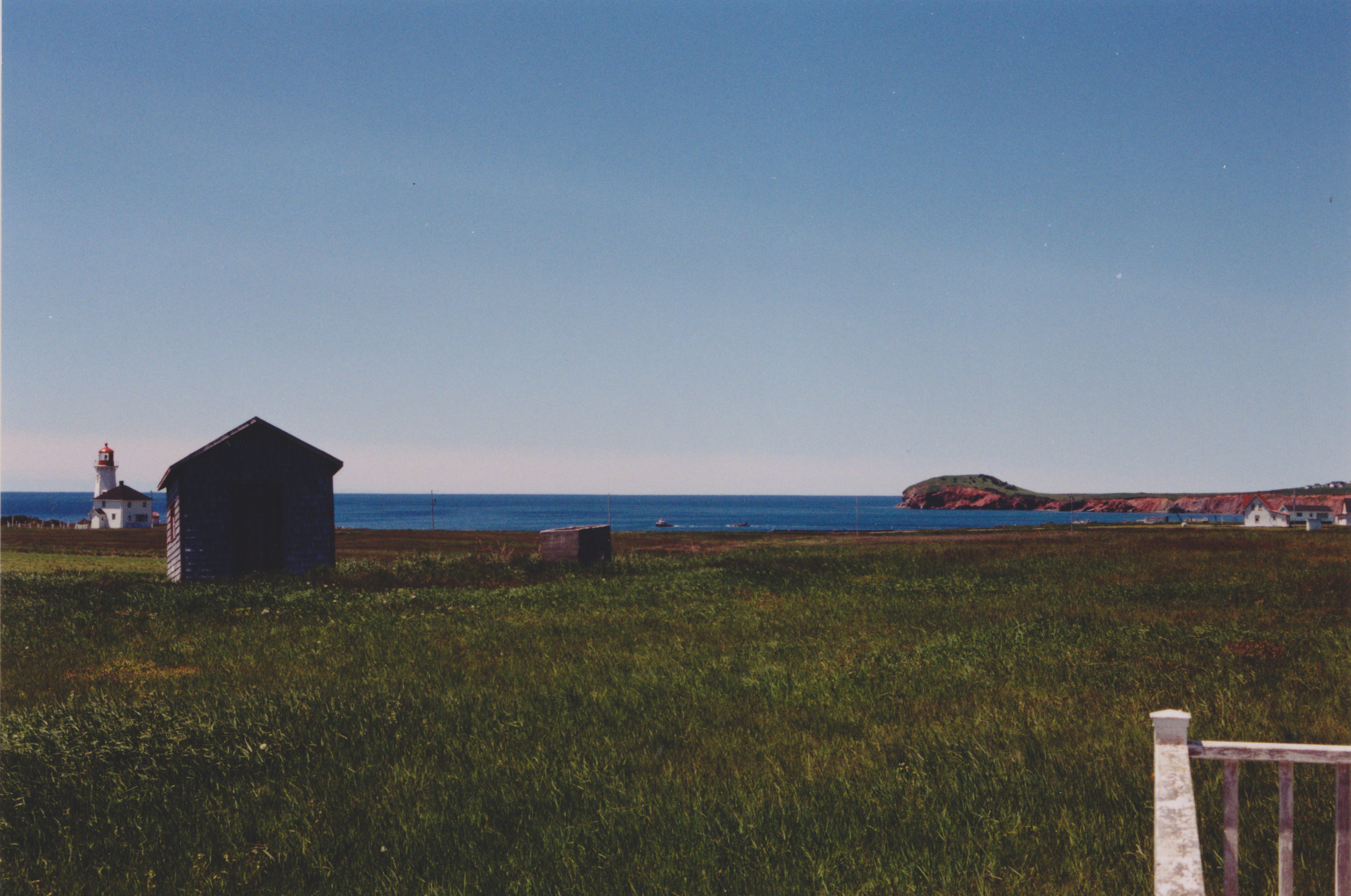
Lighthouse of L'Anse-à-la-Cabane (hamlet), former name Millerand (hamlet), Île du Havre Aubert (island)

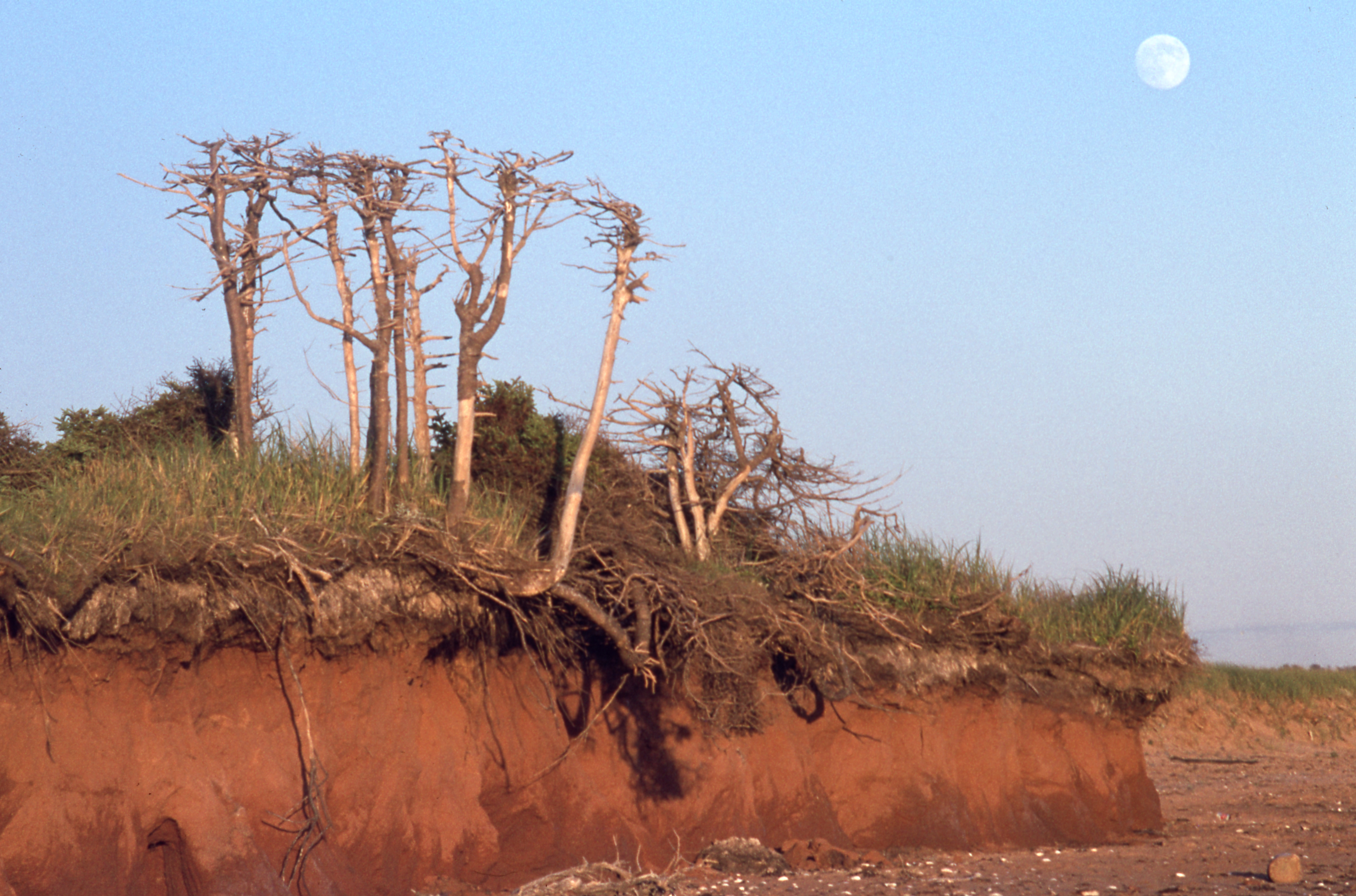
Shoreline erosion on a beach on Île du Havre Aubert (island)

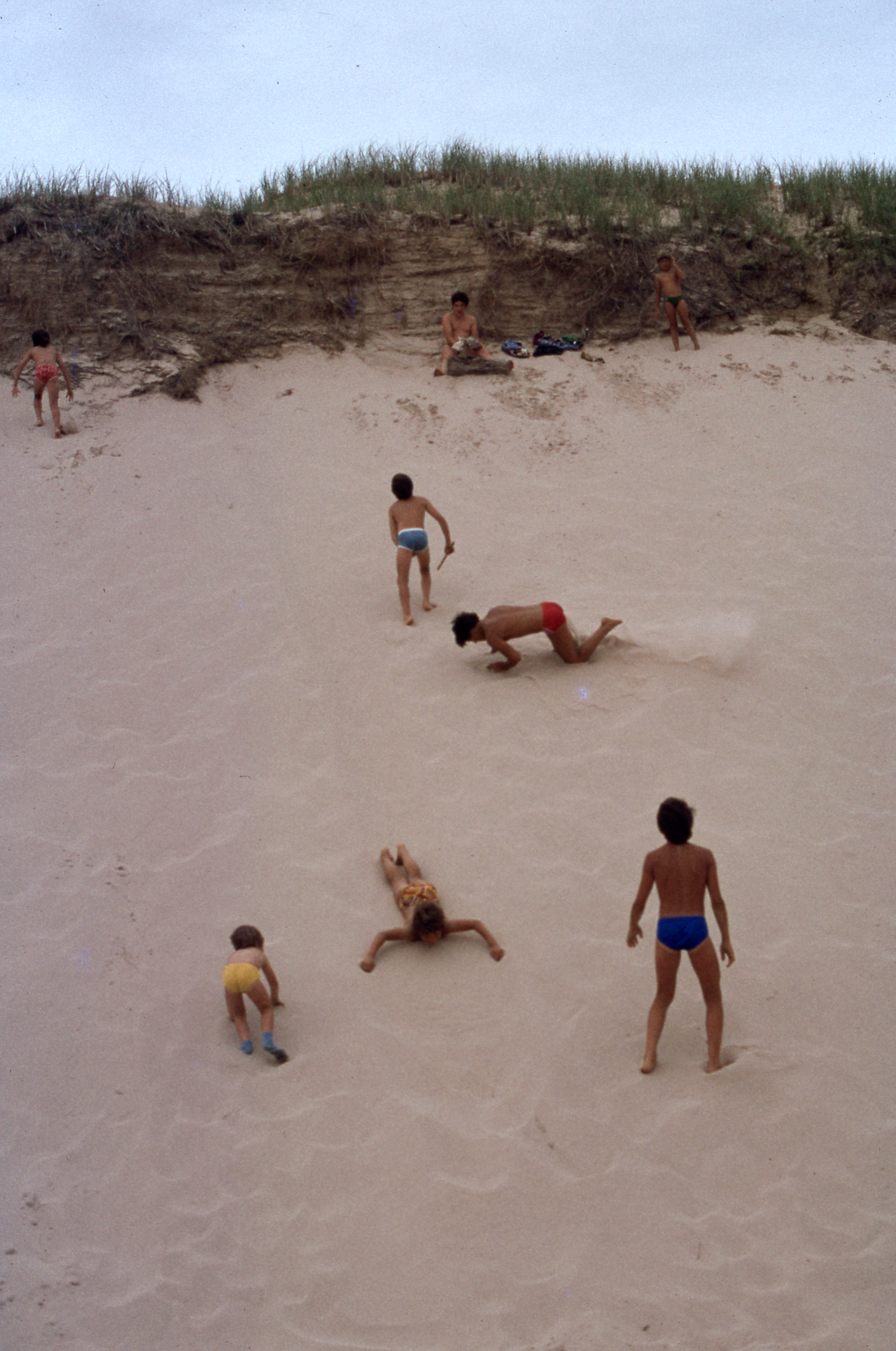
Dune du Nord (dune), between Pointe-aux-Loups (hamlet) and Grosse-Île

=== Piping plover (Charadrius melodus) ===
In the 21st century, the islands' beaches provide a habitat for the endangered piping plover (Charadrius melodus).

Many of the piping plover's nesting areas are subject to human disturbance or other threats, and it is now considered an endangered or threatened species in all parts of its range. During courtship, males perform display flights over breeding territory, with slow wingbeats and piping call notes. On the ground, males approach females, stand upright with neck stretched, and rapidly stamp their feet with an odd high-stepping gait. Usually, the nest has four eggs, sometimes two or three, and rarely five; the eggs are pale buff, spotted with black and dark brown. Their incubation period lasts 26 to 28 days.

The plover's diet includes insects, marine worms, and crustaceans; the young feed themselves. At first, both parents brood their young during cool weather, and within a few days, female birds depart, leaving males to care for young.

Piping plover

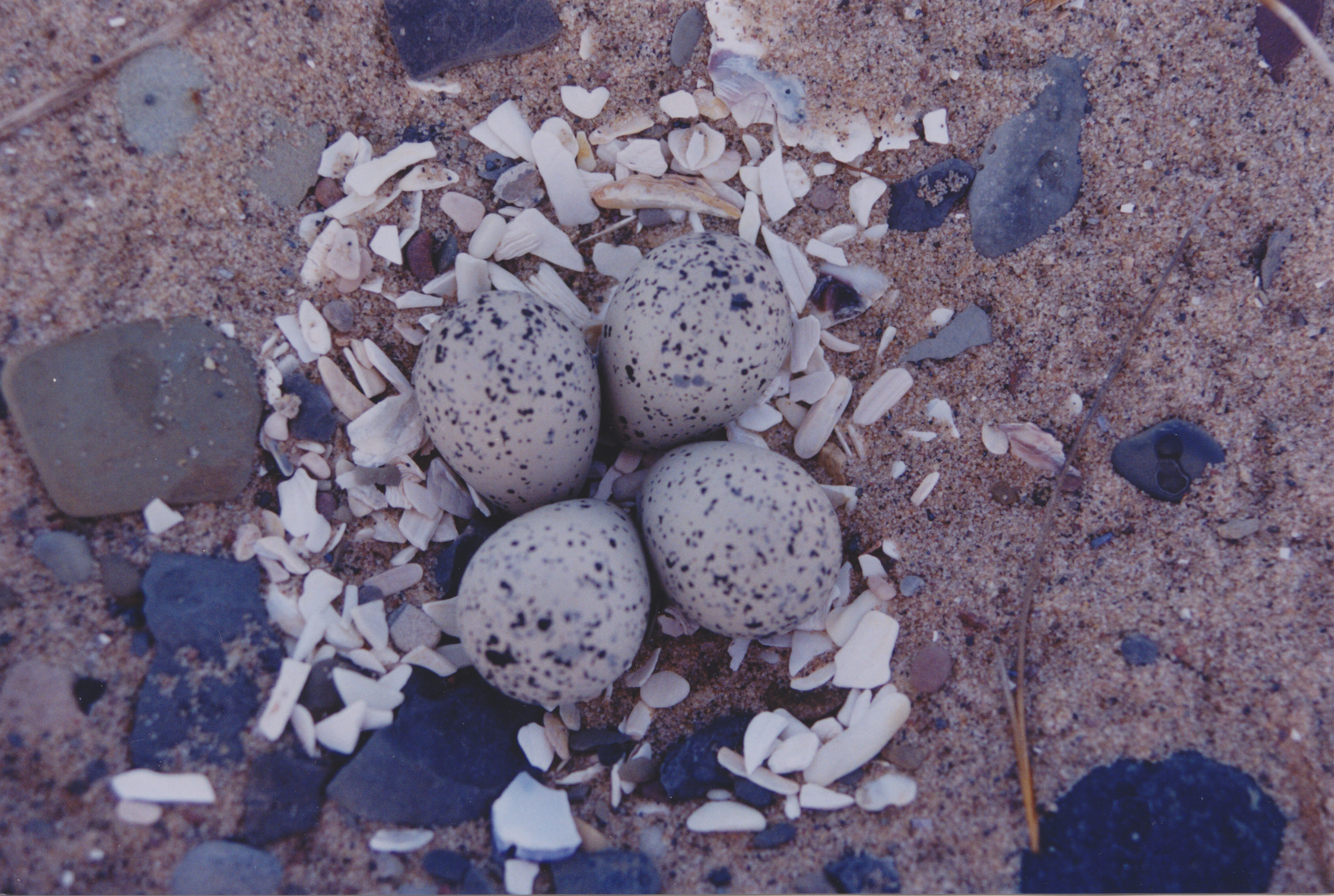
Nest of the piping plover on a beach of Île de la Grande-Entrée

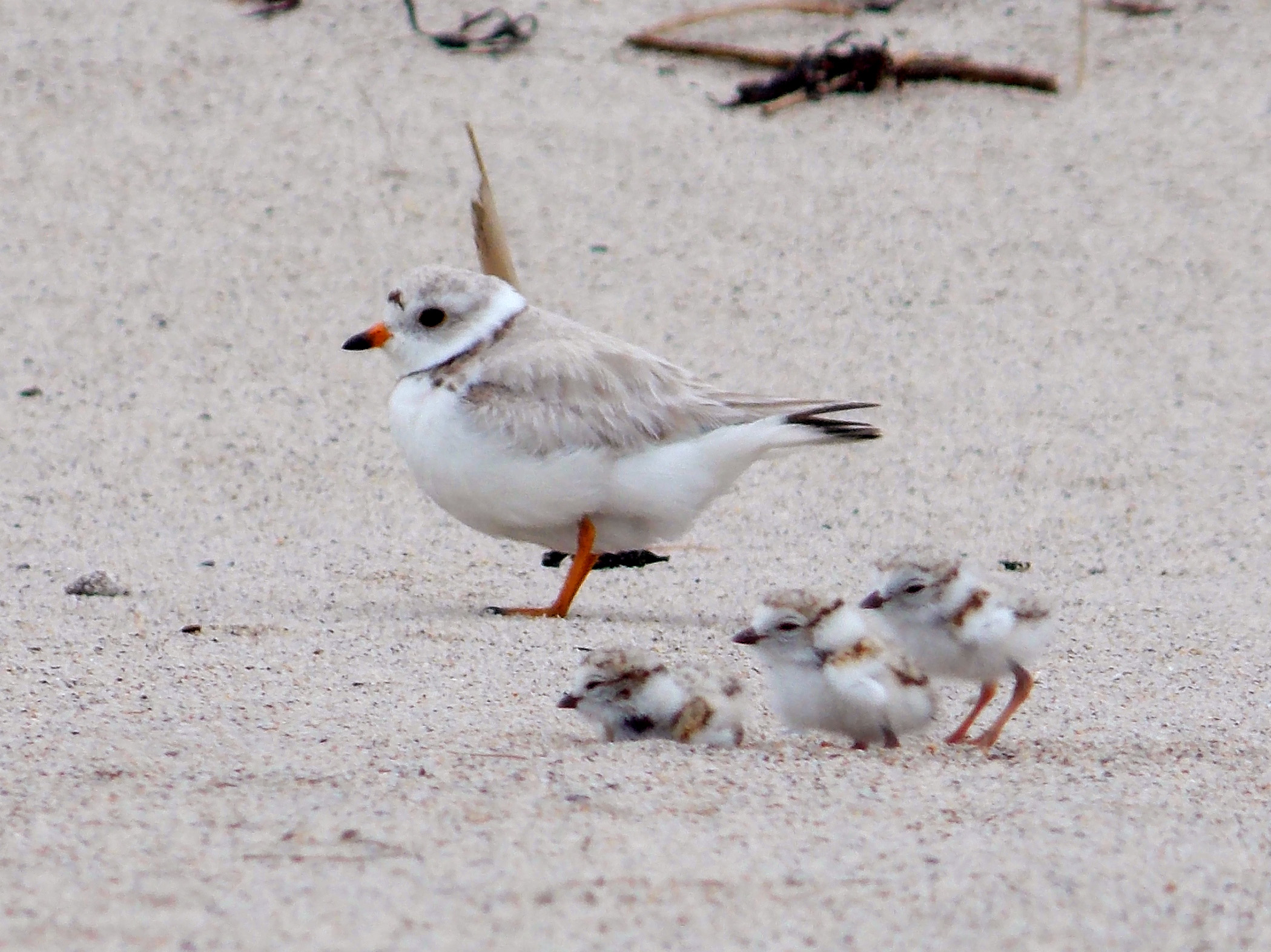
Adult and chicks

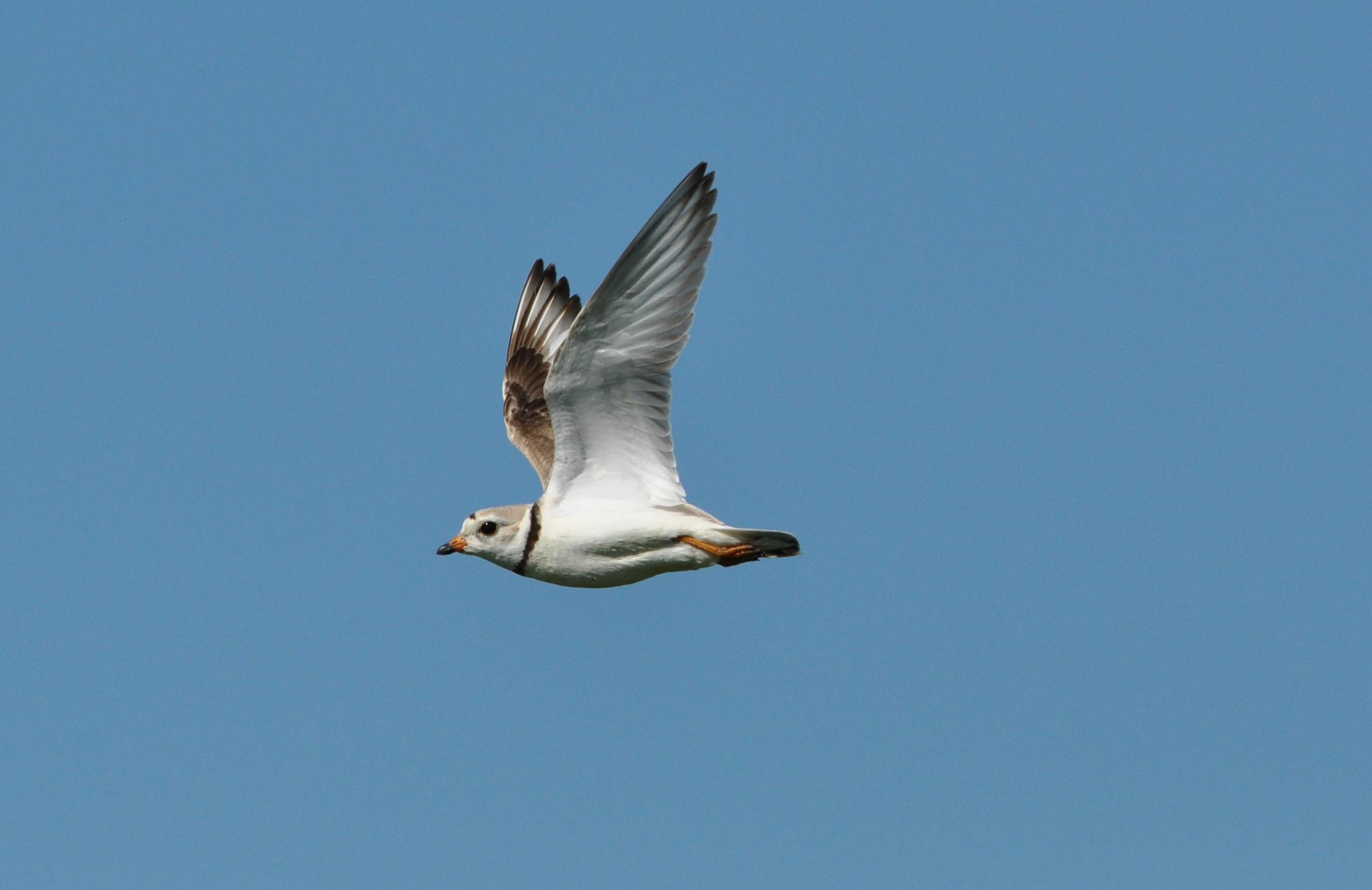
On the fly

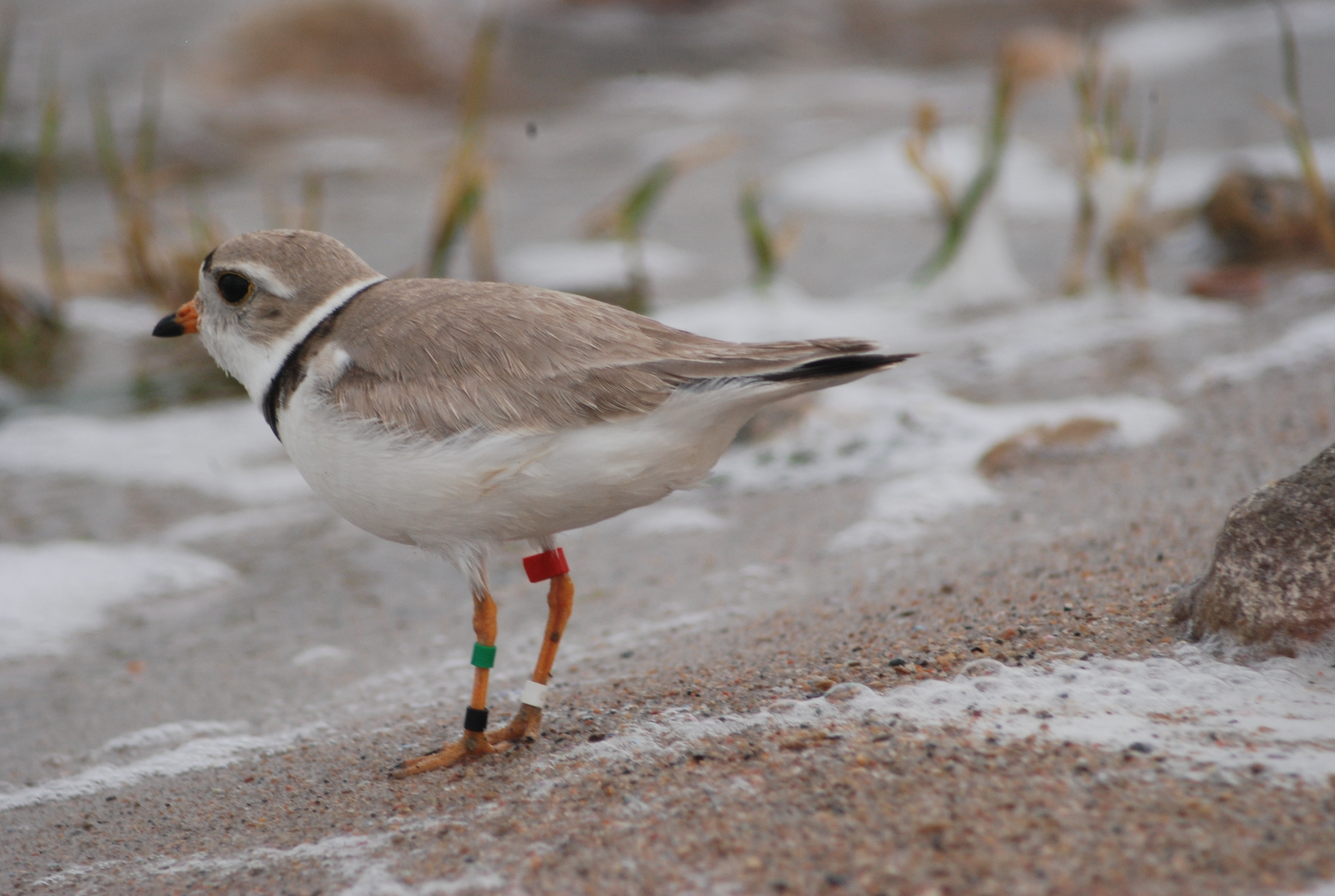
Adult

=== Rochers aux Oiseaux (Bird Rocks) ===
The Rochers aux Oiseaux (English: Bird Rocks) include the Bird Rock and the Margaulx Rock; these rocks emerge in the Gulf of St. Lawrence about 30 kilometres (19 mi) from Grosse-Île. On June 25, 1534, Jacques Cartier discovered these rocks, which he named the Îles de Margaulx because of the myriad gannets (French: margaulx), razorbills, and great auks (now extinct) that were found there. In 1919 Brother Marie-Victorin used the name Rochers aux Oiseaux during his visit to the Rocks; since 1974, the Canadian Wildlife Service has made them a Migratory Bird Sanctuary.

- Bird Rock is 300 metres (984 ft) long by 150 metres (492 ft) wide and 30 metres (98 ft) high, and forms a kind of red sandstone citadel that is practically inaccessible but inhabited by thousands of birds and a lighthouse that is now automated.
- Margaulx Rock is 1.3 kilometres (1 mi) to the northwest, and refers to three small cays.
Bird Rocks Migratory Bird Sanctuary

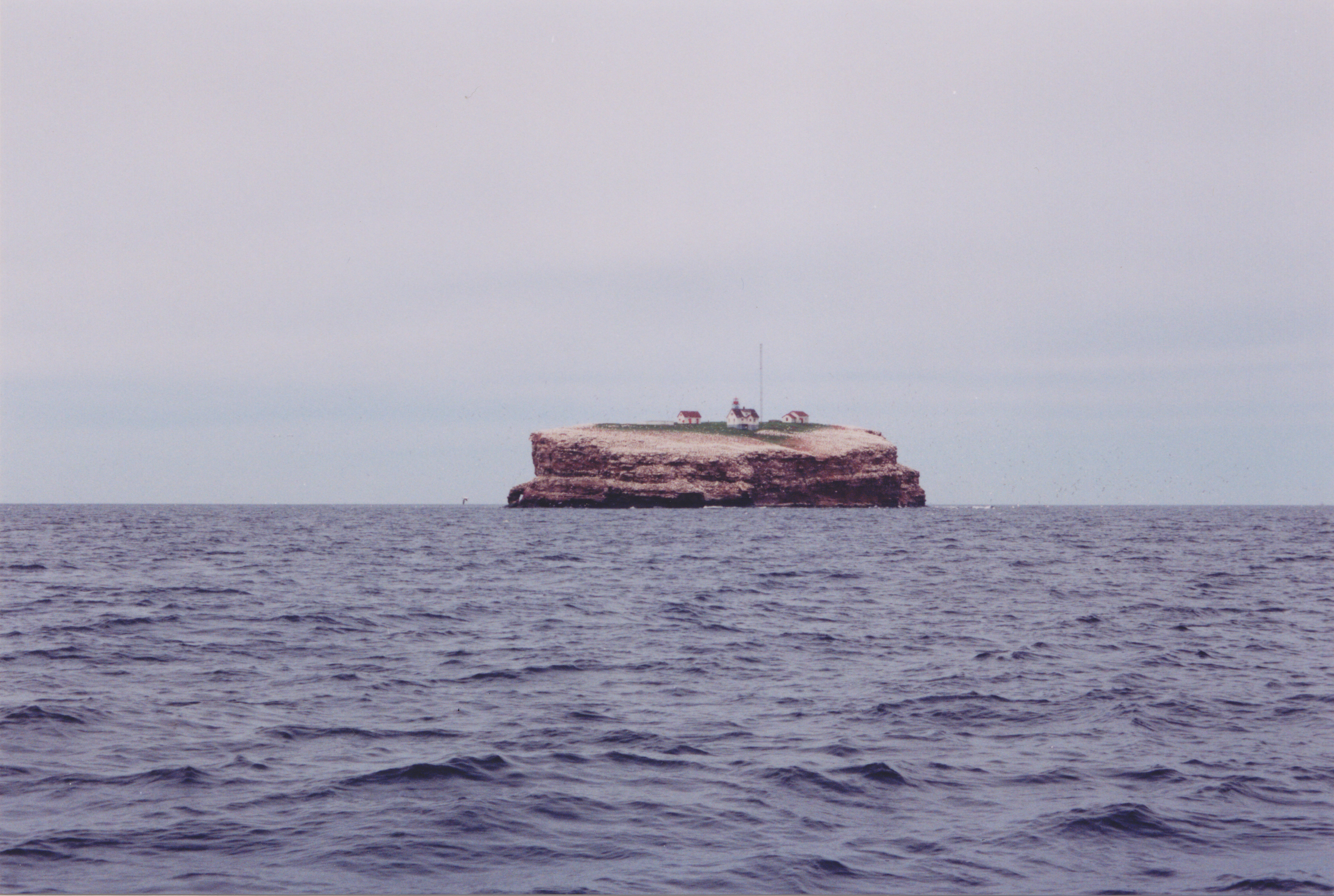
Lighthouse, keepers' house, and outbuildings

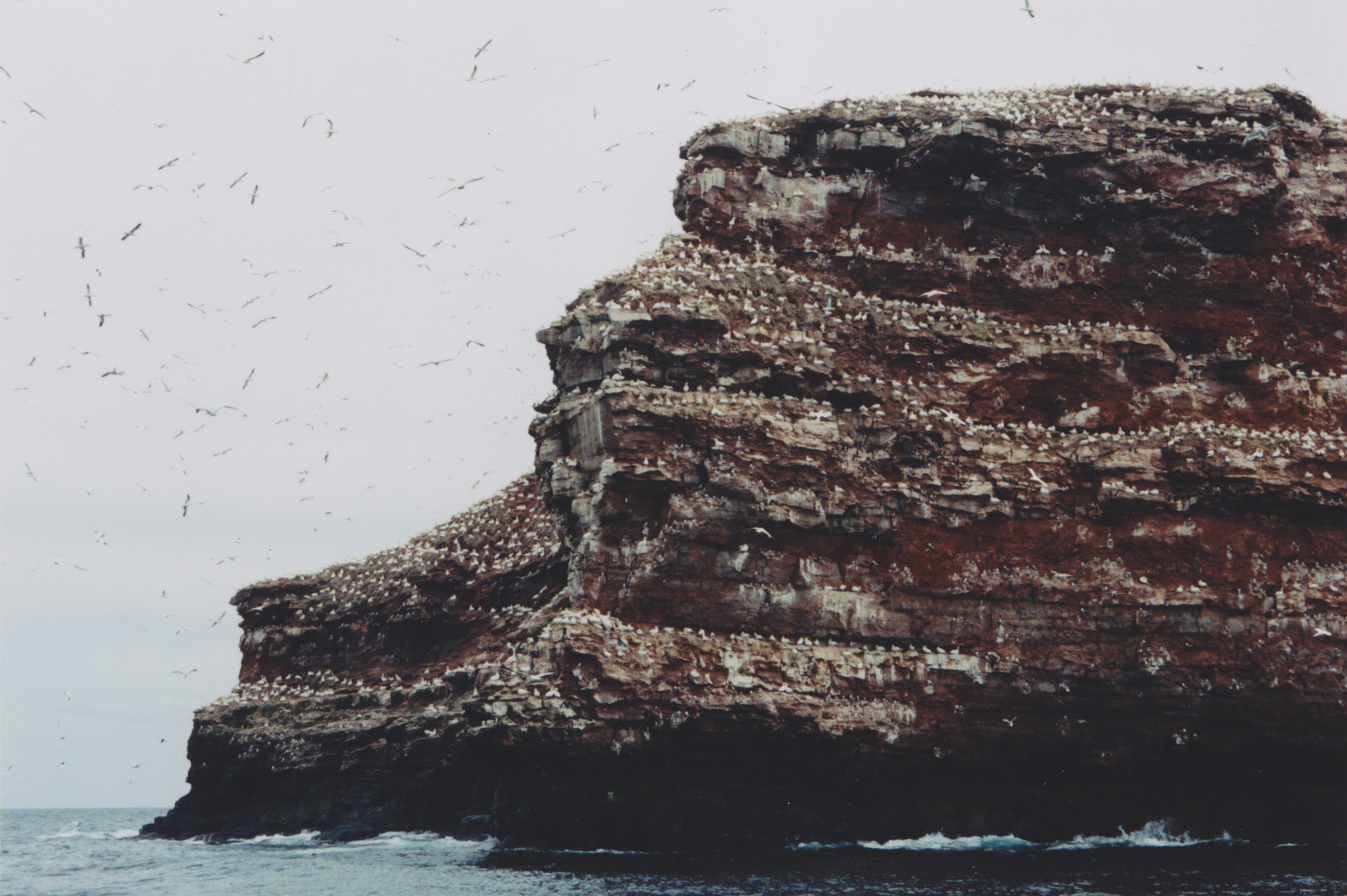
Red sandstone citadel

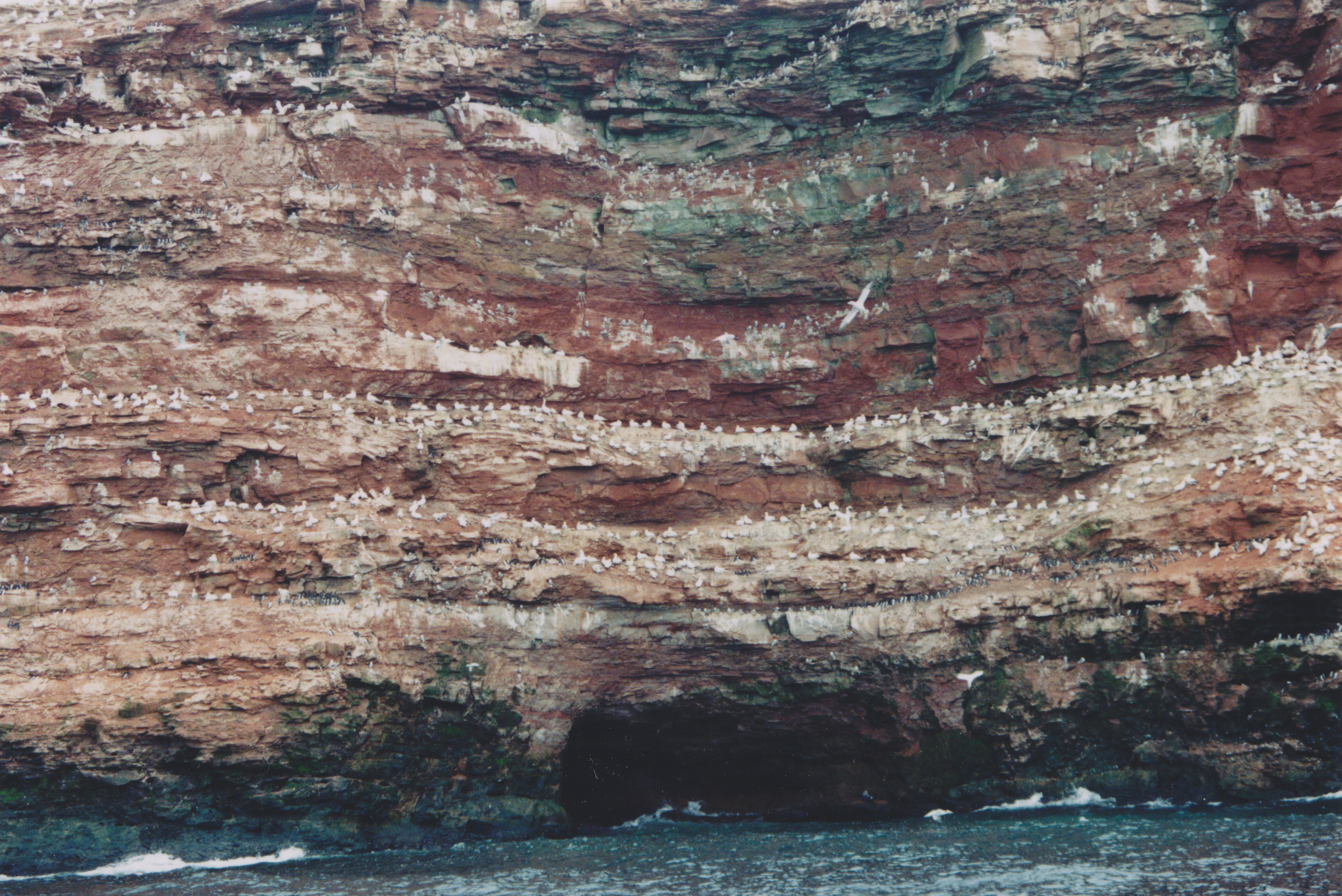
Support one of the six Northern gannet colonies in North America

=== Pointe de l'Est National Wildlife Area ===
The Pointe de l'Est National Wildlife Area is located on La Grosse Île and the reserve occupies an area of 748 hectares (1,848 acres) in the village of the same name. It offers landscapes characteristic of the Islands: a reddish rocky core, coastal belts reshaped by the wind into dunes, moors, huge beaches and freshwater, saltwater or brackish water ponds. The reserve has six hiking trails from 0.6 to 1.8 kilometres (660 to 1,970 yd) in length: L'Échouerie, Le Rabougri, La Camarine, La Lande, Le Mitan, Le Bol-à-Soupe.

Grande Échouerie Beach Trail Flora

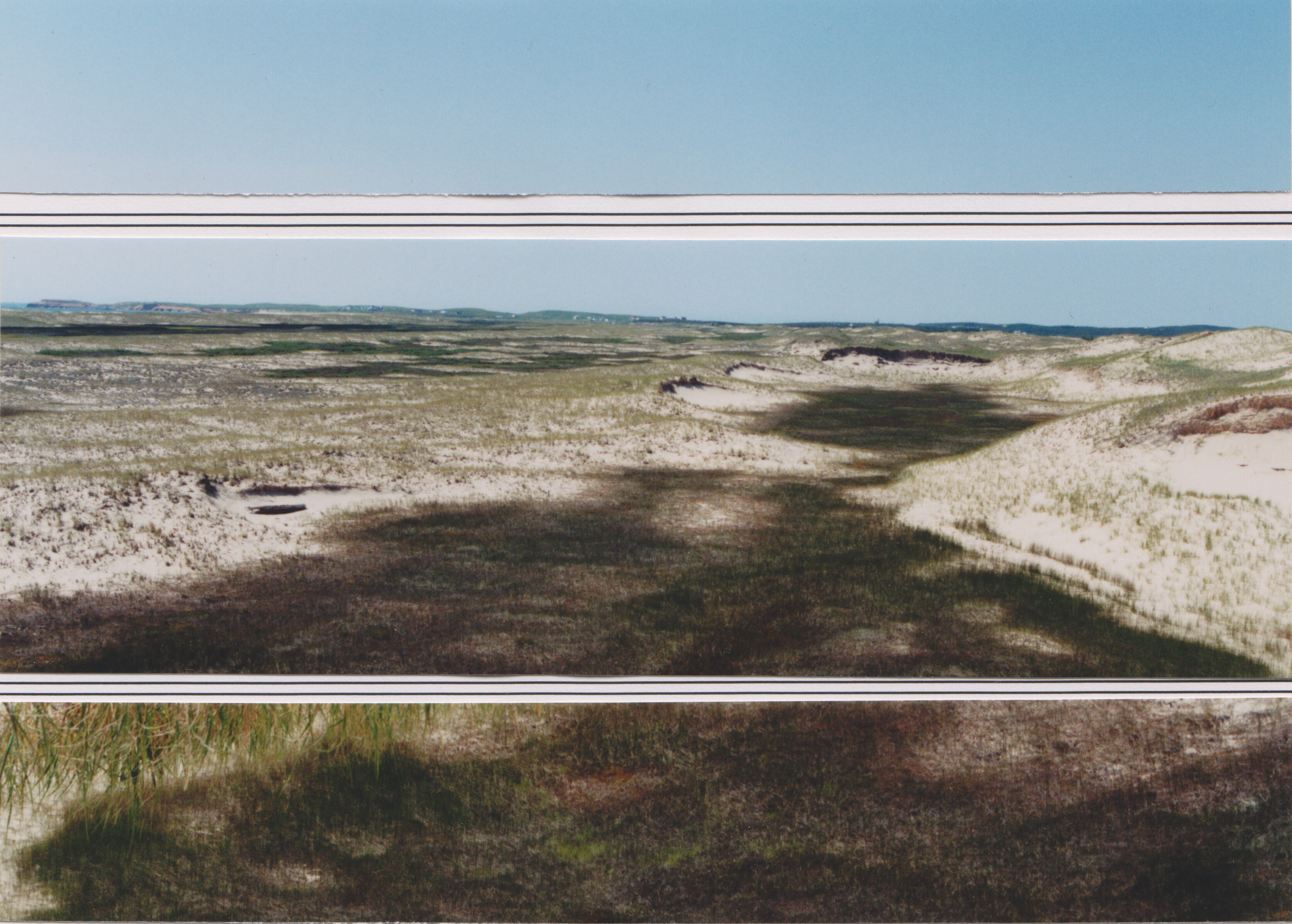
Dunes and beaches

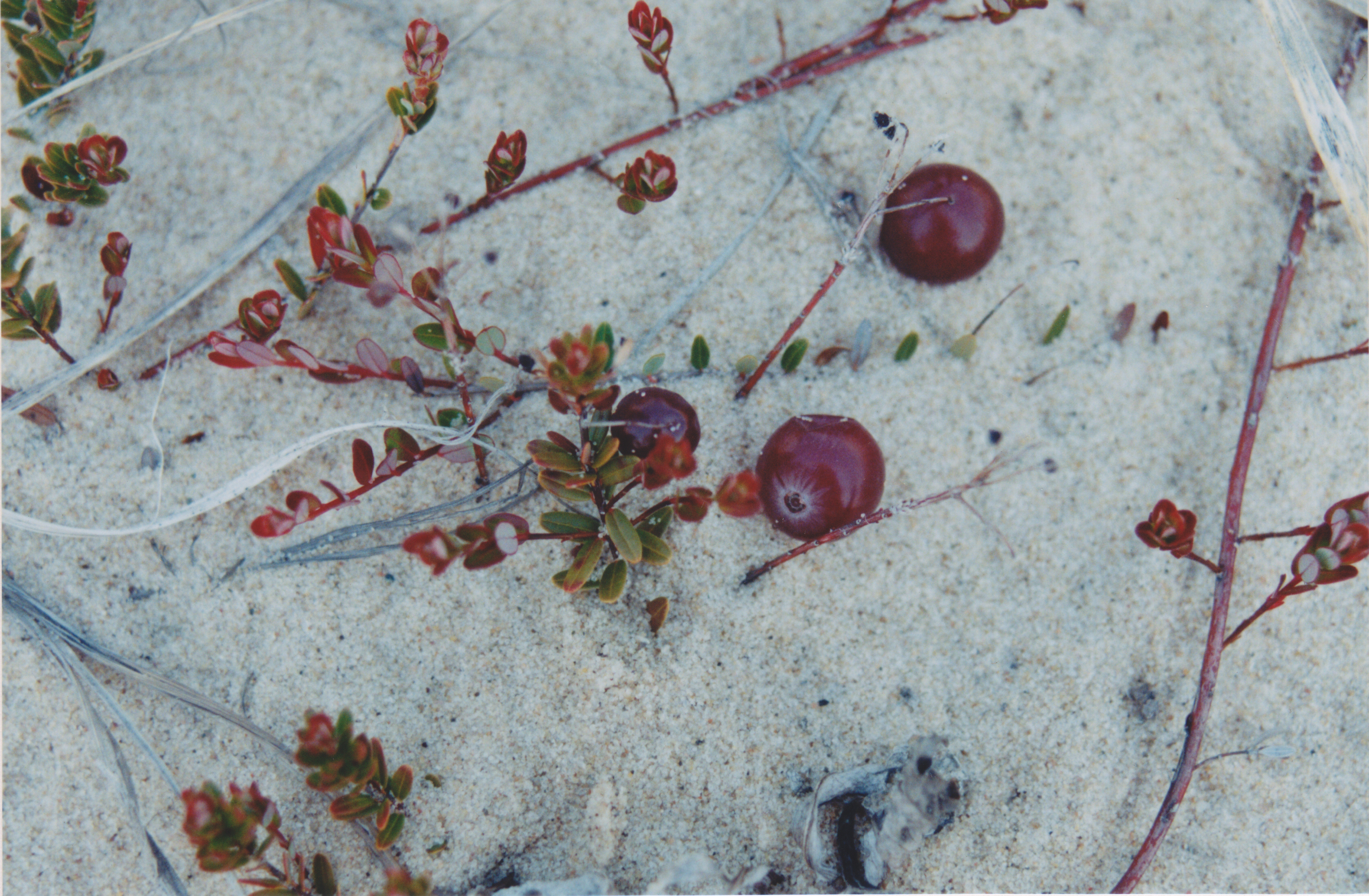
Vaccinium macrocarpon - Large cranberry.

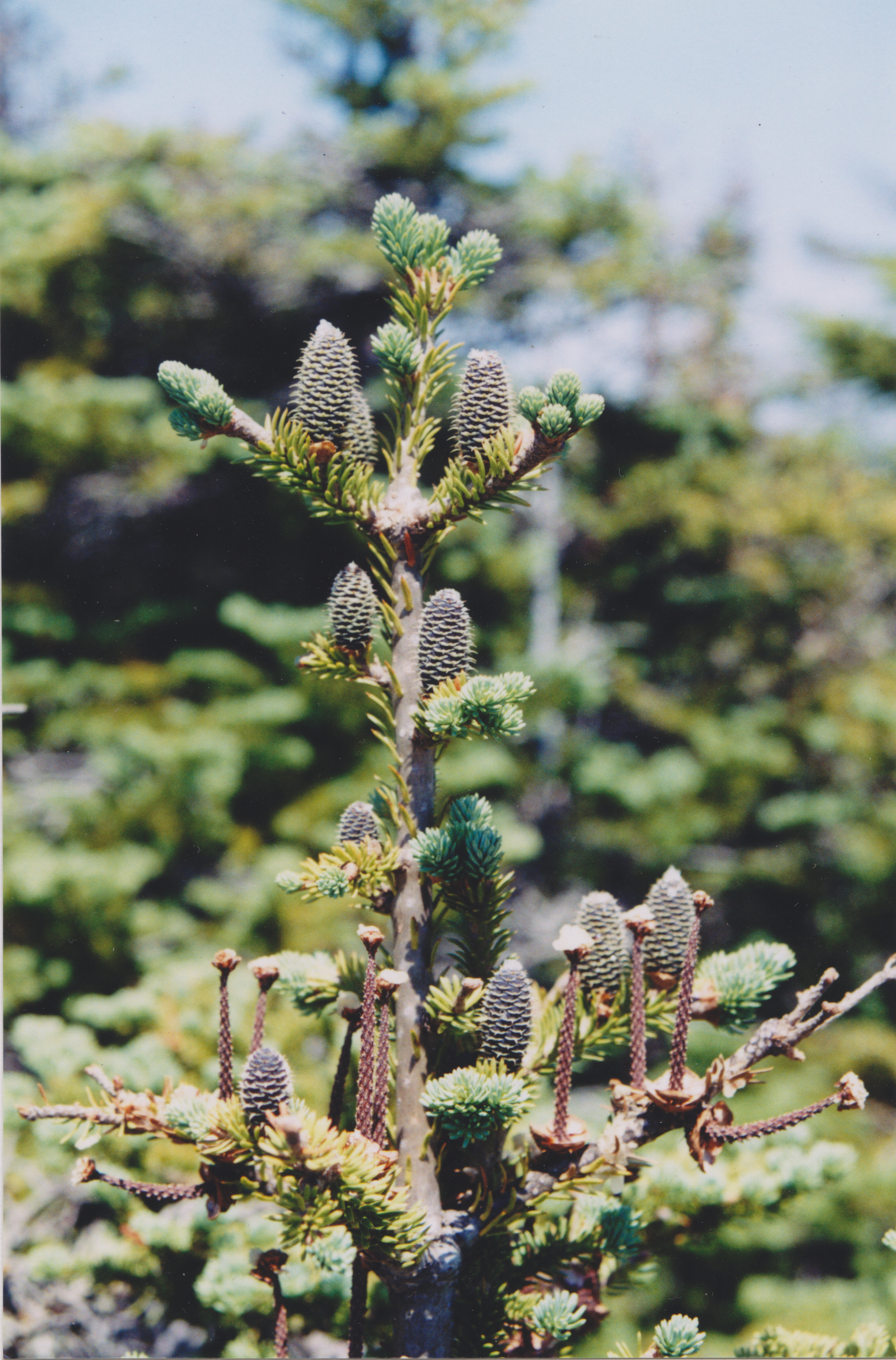
Abies balsamea - Balsam fir.

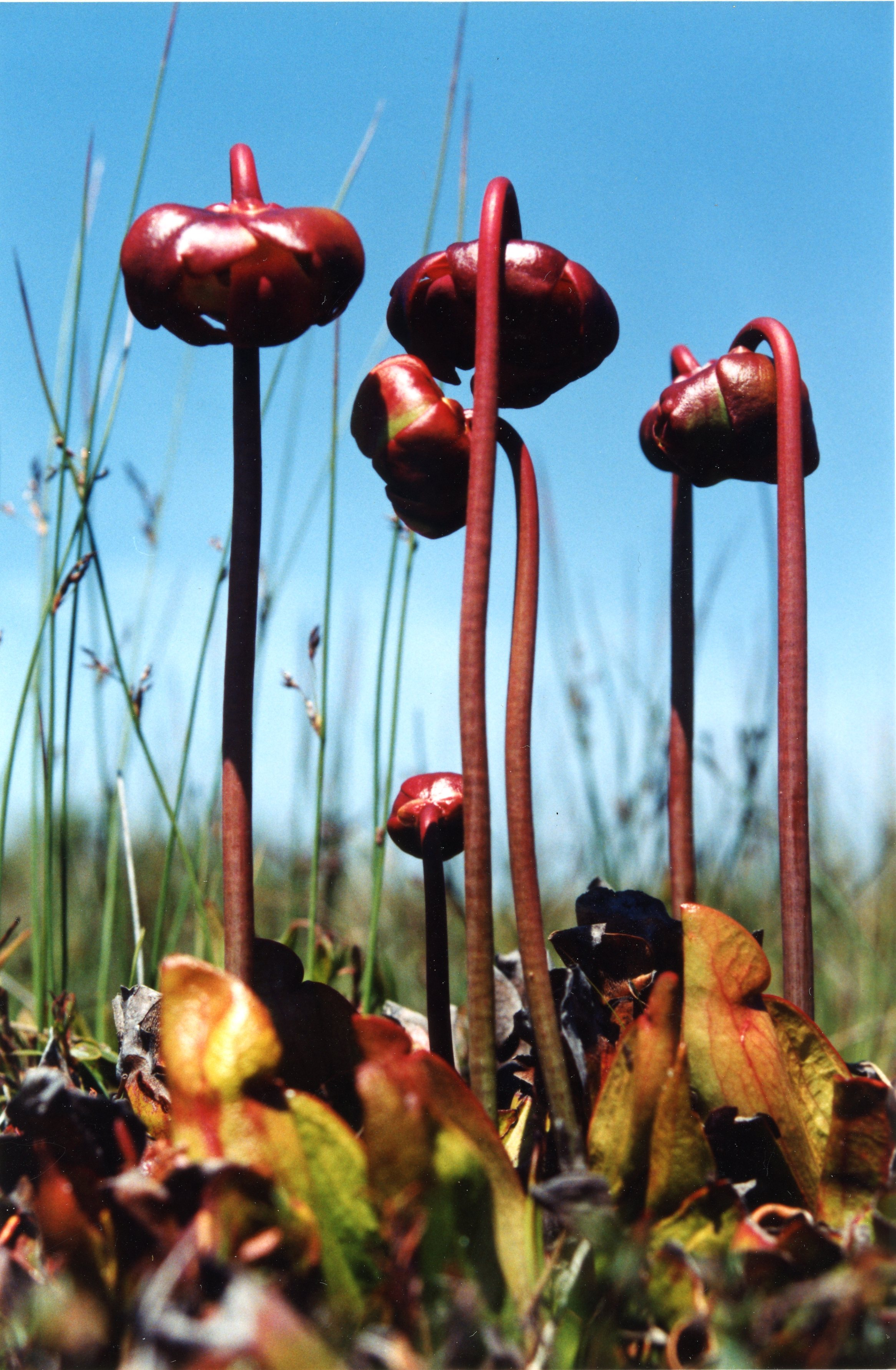
Sarracenia purpurea - Purple pitcher plant.

== Nomenclature ==
Owing to the succession of French and English influences, it is not surprising that each of the islands has several names.

The names used by the Acadians of the archipelago are as follows: Grande-Entrée, Grosse-Île, Pointe-aux-Loups island, Havre-aux-Maisons (House Harbour), Cap-aux-Meules (Grindstone), Havre-Aubert (Amherst), and L'Île d'Entrée (Entry Island) . Uninhabited islets such as Bird Rocks and Brion Island complete the archipelago.

== Geography ==
While the Îles de la Madeleine are a land area of 205.53 square kilometres (79.36 sq mi) in the province of Québec, they are in fact closer to the Maritime provinces and Newfoundland than to the Gaspé Peninsula on the Québec mainland. The Mi'kmaq consider the islands a part of the Epekwitk aq Piktuk district of Mi'kma'ki—the traditional territory of the Mi'kmaq Nation—and call the islands Menagoesenog.

Administratively, the islands are part of the Gaspésie–Îles-de-la-Madeleine region in the Canadian province of Québec. The islands form the territory equivalent to a regional county municipality (TE) and the census division (CD) of Les Îles-de-la-Madeleine. Their geographical code is 01.

The islands are also coextensive with the urban agglomeration of Les Îles-de-la-Madeleine, which is divided into two municipalities: Les Îles-de-la-Madeleine (2011 census pop. 12,291), the central municipality, and Grosse-Île (pop. 490). Their mayors are Gaétan Richard and Rose Elmonde Clarke, respectively.

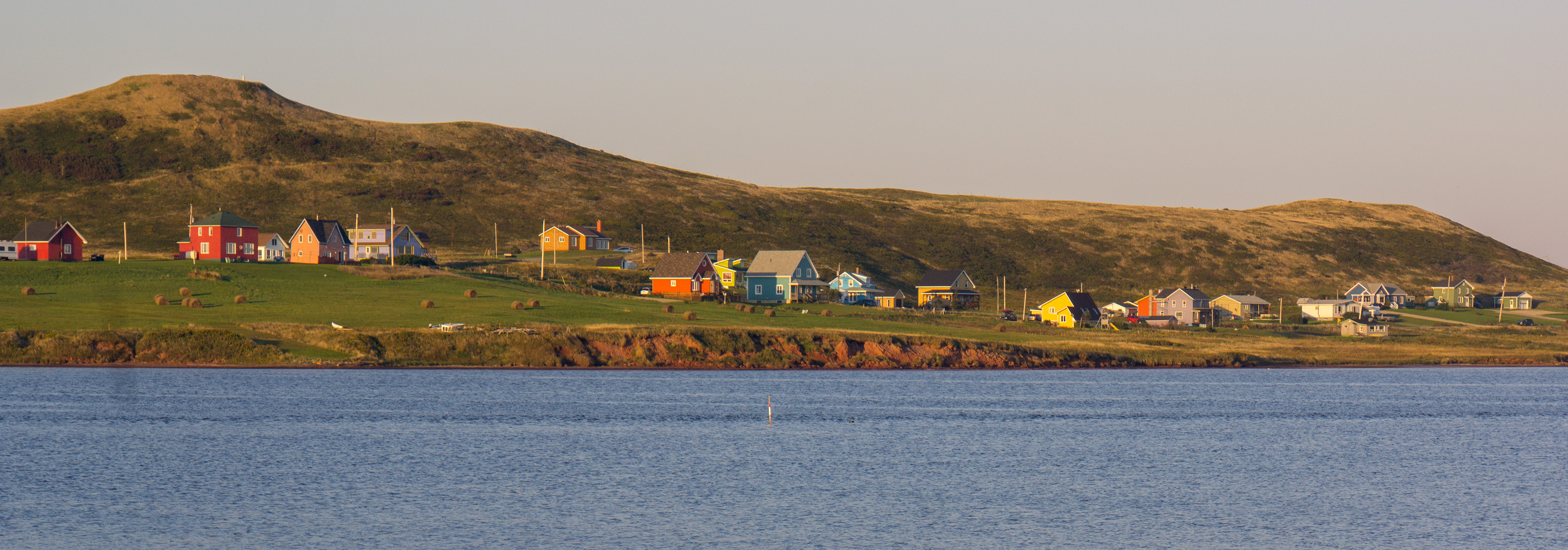

Within the area known as Dawnland, these islands were once called Menquit by the Mi'kmaw Nation, meaning "islands battered by waves." Around the mid 19th century as Mi'kmawi'simk (the Mi'kmaw language) shifted, the name changed to become Menagoesenog reflecting islands "battered by the surf." Although not a distinct district within Mi'kma'ki, the archipelago falls within the territorial bounds of the Mi'kmaw homeland.

== Demographics ==
=== Population ===
Canada census – Les Îles-de-la-Madeleine, Quebec community profile

	2011
Population	12,781 (-2.4% from 2006)
Land area	205.40 km^{2} (79.31 sq mi)
Population density	62.2/km^{2} (161/sq mi)
Median age	48.1 (M: 47.9, F: 48.4)
Private dwellings	6,153 (total)
Median household income	$52,267

References: 2011

Historical Census Data - Les Îles-de-la-Madeleine, Quebec

Year	Pop.	±%
1991	13,991	—
1996	13,802	−1.4%

Year	Pop.	±%
2001	12,824	−7.1%
2006	13,091	+2.1%

Year	Pop.	±%
2011	12,781	−2.4%

=== Language ===
Canada Census Mother Tongue - Les Îles-de-la-Madeleine, Quebec
Census	Total	French			English			French & English			Other		
Year	Responses	Count	Trend	Pop %	Count	Trend	Pop %	Count	Trend	Pop %	Count	Trend	Pop %
2011	12,660	11,900	▼1.1%	94.00%	695	▼16.3%	5.49%	40	▼20.0%	0.32%	25	▼61.5%	0.20%
2006	12,975	12,030	▲1.9%	92.72%	830	▲16.9%	6.40%	50	▲100.0%	0.38%	65	▲37.5%	0.50%
2001	12,575	11,800	▼8.7%	93.84%	710	▼0.7%	5.65%	25	▼58.3%	0.20%	40	▲33.3%	0.32%
1996	13,730	12,925	n/a	94.13%	715	n/a	5.21%	60	n/a	0.44%	30	n/a	0.22%

== Climate ==
The maritime climate of the Îles de la Madeleine is markedly different from that of the mainland. The huge water masses that circle the archipelago both temper the weather and create milder conditions in each season. On the islands, winter is mild, spring is cool, summer has a few heat waves, and fall is typically warm. The Îles de la Madeleine have the least annual frost in Quebec. The warm breezes of summer persist well into September and sometimes early October. However, under the Köppen climate classification its climate is humid continental (Dfb) because its winters average far below freezing by maritime standards. Seasonal lag is strong because of the freezing water and the time that it takes for the gulf to warm up again. Also, in winter, sea ice occasionally forms, impeding offshore communications and activities.

The highest temperature ever recorded was 31.1 °C (88 °F) on 31 July 1949. The lowest temperature ever recorded was −27.2 °C (−17 °F) on 14 February 1891.

The Îles de la Madeleine have warmed 2.3 °C (4 °F) in the late 19th century, twice the global average. As a result, the residents are facing a growing number of problems, as extreme climate change transforms the land and water around them. The sea ice that used to encase and protect the islands from most winter storms is shrinking at a rate of about 1,437 km^{2} (555 sq mi) annually. Parts of the shoreline have eroded into the sea at a rate as much as 4.3 metres (14 ft) per year in the 2010s. Important roads are at risk of washouts, and important infrastructure, including the hospital and city hall, sit near deteriorating cliffs. Recently the sea has been rising at a rate of 7 mm (0.28 in) per decade, threatening to contaminate freshwater aquifers.

Climate data for Îles-de-la-Madeleine Airport, 1991–2020 normals, extremes 1890–present (Note: Climate data was recorded on Grindstone Island in the community of Cap-aux-Meules from August 1890 to February 1983 and at Îles-de-la-Madeleine Airport from May 1983 to present.)
Month	Jan	Feb	Mar	Apr	May	Jun	Jul	Aug	Sep	Oct	Nov	Dec	Year
Record high humidex	13.6	7.7	11.1	16.8	25.0	32.8	37.0	37.1	33.5	26.3	20.4	13.7	37.1
Record high °C (°F)	12.3 (54.1)	9.0 (48.2)	12.0 (53.6)	17.2 (63.0)	25.4 (77.7)	28.9 (84.0)	31.1 (88.0)	30.6 (87.1)	28.3 (82.9)	21.6 (70.9)	20.4 (68.7)	13.1 (55.6)	31.1 (88.0)
Mean daily maximum °C (°F)	−2.5 (27.5)	−3.6 (25.5)	−0.7 (30.7)	4.1 (39.4)	10.4 (50.7)	15.9 (60.6)	20.8 (69.4)	21.3 (70.3)	17.3 (63.1)	11.4 (52.5)	6.1 (43.0)	1.1 (34.0)	8.5 (47.3)
Daily mean °C (°F)	−5.5 (22.1)	−6.8 (19.8)	−3.6 (25.5)	1.5 (34.7)	7.1 (44.8)	12.5 (54.5)	17.7 (63.9)	18.4 (65.1)	14.5 (58.1)	9.0 (48.2)	3.7 (38.7)	−1.3 (29.7)	5.6 (42.1)
Mean daily minimum °C (°F)	−8.4 (16.9)	−10.1 (13.8)	−6.4 (20.5)	−1.2 (29.8)	3.7 (38.7)	9.1 (48.4)	14.6 (58.3)	15.4 (59.7)	11.7 (53.1)	6.4 (43.5)	1.3 (34.3)	−3.6 (25.5)	2.7 (36.9)
Record low °C (°F)	−26.5 (−15.7)	−27.2 (−17.0)	−26.1 (−15.0)	−12.9 (8.8)	−6.1 (21.0)	0.0 (32.0)	1.8 (35.2)	3.9 (39.0)	−1.1 (30.0)	−5.6 (21.9)	−12.8 (9.0)	−24.4 (−11.9)	−27.2 (−17.0)
Record low wind chill	−42.1	−41.3	−37.1	−23.2	−10.2	0.0	0.0	0.0	0.0	−8.6	−21.2	−32.8	−42.1
Average precipitation mm (inches)	92.8 (3.65)	74.3 (2.93)	75.8 (2.98)	71.2 (2.80)	79.4 (3.13)	74.7 (2.94)	84.0 (3.31)	77.7 (3.06)	96.9 (3.81)	107.8 (4.24)	99.3 (3.91)	103.7 (4.08)	1,037.7 (40.85)
Average rainfall mm (inches)	37.1 (1.46)	27.4 (1.08)	39.0 (1.54)	56.7 (2.23)	82.0 (3.23)	76.3 (3.00)	75.5 (2.97)	84.2 (3.31)	95.8 (3.77)	93.3 (3.67)	91.6 (3.61)	43.6 (1.72)	802.6 (31.60)
Average snowfall cm (inches)	61.1 (24.1)	47.5 (18.7)	37.0 (14.6)	17.0 (6.7)	4.5 (1.8)	0.0 (0.0)	0.0 (0.0)	0.0 (0.0)	0.0 (0.0)	0.7 (0.3)	17.3 (6.8)	51.7 (20.4)	236.8 (93.2)
Average precipitation days (≥ 0.2 mm)	22.5	16.8	16.7	13.7	14.2	11.4	13.4	12.0	12.3	16.7	17.5	21.0	188.0
Average rainy days (≥ 0.2 mm)	5.6	4.3	7.3	10.6	14.1	12.3	13.1	12.5	13.1	17.2	14.1	7.2	131.2
Average snowy days (≥ 0.2 cm)	20.2	14.4	12.3	6.1	0.95	0.0	0.0	0.0	0.0	0.61	7.8	17.9	80.2
Average relative humidity (%) (at 1300 LST)	81.8	80.8	79.8	77.1	73.5	74.2	74.8	73.5	74.2	75.5	78.1	80.8	77.0
Average dew point °C (°F)	−8.3 (17.1)	−8.9 (16.0)	−5.0 (23.0)	−1.1 (30.0)	3.3 (37.9)	9.3 (48.7)	13.8 (56.8)	13.6 (56.5)	9.7 (49.5)	4.5 (40.1)	0.5 (32.9)	−4.8 (23.4)	2.2 (36.0)
Mean monthly sunshine hours	62.6	110.1	126.3	142.7	206.5	237.4	247.0	237.0	162.4	114.1	68.5	34.2	1,748.8
Source: Environment CanadaEnvironment and Climate Change Canada (rain/rain days, snow/snow days, humidex, wind chill 1981–2010) (dew point, and sun 1951–1980)

== Erosion ==
Several news articles in 2019 pointed out that erosion of the coastline had already become a significant issue. Researchers have found that the amount has doubled since 2005, and was averaging 0.5 metres (1 ft 8 in) per year. Recent events that added to the problem included a significant windstorm in November 2018 and the post-tropical storm Dorian that hit the islands in September 2019.

A report in The Washington Post in late October 2019 also indicated that increasing temperatures have led to reduced ice cover over the years, leading to less protection from winter storms. "That ice has been disappearing ... [and the] sea-level rise, have caused the islands to crumble into the sea".

Researchers have found that the rise in sea levels has been approximately double that of the global norm and that the sea ice is shrinking at approximately 12% per decade. A November 2019 report from The Washington Post provided these specifics about the effects of erosion:

"Some parts of the shoreline have lost as much as 14 feet (4 m) per year to the sea over the past decade. Key roads face perpetual risk of washing out. The hospital and the city hall sit alarmingly close to deteriorating cliffs. Rising waters threaten to contaminate aquifers used for drinking water ... Nearly a dozen homes on the islands have been relocated, and most everyone expects that number to grow."

The sole benefit has been the increase in lobster yields on the islands, at least double what was the norm in the past.

== Economy ==
=== Tourism ===
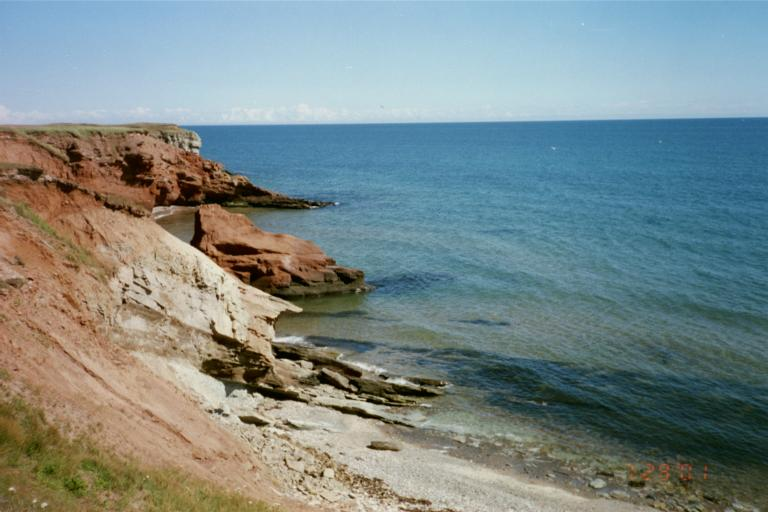
Cliffs along the shore of Grosse Île

Tourism is a major component of the islands' economy, as they have many kilometres (miles) of white sand beaches and steadily-eroding sandstone cliffs. Also, they are a destination for bicycle camping, sea kayaking, windsurfing, and kitesurfing. During the winter months, beginning in mid-February, ecotourists visit to observe newborn and young harp seal pups on the pack ice in the Gulf of St. Lawrence, which surrounds the islands. However the ice cover has reduced recently and the observation "season" has been cancelled several times.

=== Industry ===
The island is home to Canadian Salt Company Seleine Mines, which produces road salt for use in Quebec, Atlantic Canada and the United States' eastern seaboard. Opened in 1982, the salt mine and plant is located in Grosse-Île and extracts salt from an underground mine 30 metres (98 ft) below Grande-Entrée Lagoon. It produces 1,000,000 tonnes (980,000 long tons; 1,100,000 short tons) of salt, and employs 200 people.

Although fishing is a traditional occupation, lobster have become a more lucrative local business. It was once common for lobstermen to haul in 15,000 pounds (6,800 kg) during a nine-week season that begins each spring, but now it is not unusual to bring home twice that amount, or more. This may be due to climate change that has warmed the surrounding waters to some extent, yielded increasing lobster harvests. An identification guide for marine fishes of the estuary and northern Gulf of St. Lawrence was completed in 2008.

=== Energy ===
The islands currently generate electricity at the Cap-aux-Meules oil-fired thermal power plant. The 67 MW plant generates 125,000 tonnes of greenhouse gases per year, or about 40% of Hydro-Québec's direct emissions. Hydro-Québec plans to build an undersea HVDC cable from the mainland 225 km (140 miles) away, connecting the islands to the main grid upon completion in 2027. The plan will cost $2.3 billion over 40 years, saving approximately 12%, and reduce emissions by 94%.

== See also ==
- List of regional county municipalities and equivalent territories in Quebec
- Quebec Route 199, the only provincial highway on the islands
- Coopérative de transport maritime et aérien, the ferry company serving the Magdalen Islands
- Maritime Quebec
- List of Quebec regions
- Coins of the Magdalen Islands (numismatic history).
- List of islands of Quebec
