= Brion Island =

Uninhabited island in Quebec, Canada

Île Brion
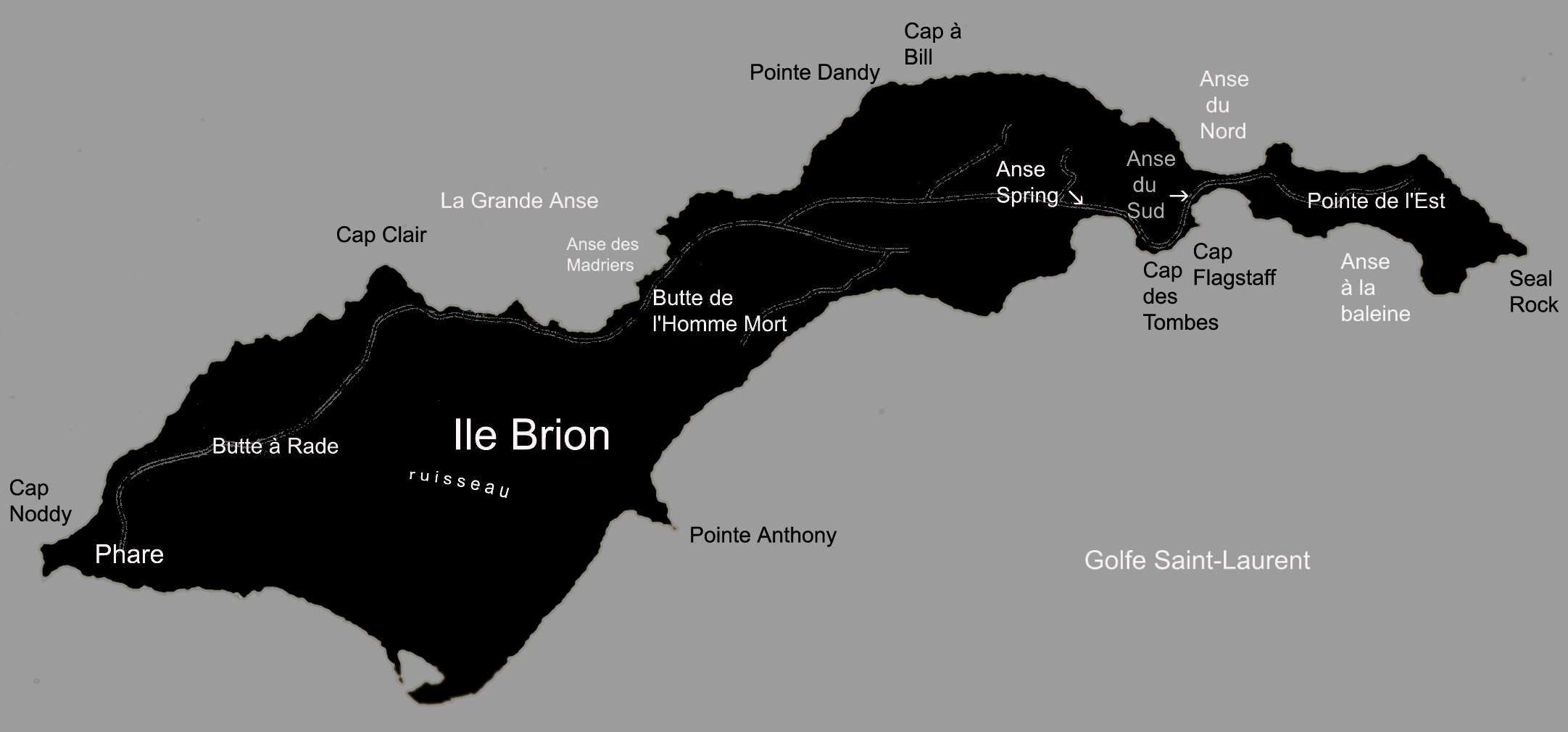
- Map of Brion Island

- Location within Quebec

Geography
- Location: Gulf of Saint Lawrence
- Coordinates: 47°47′34″N 61°28′05″W
- Archipelago: Magdalen Islands
- Area: 6.5 km^{2} (2.5 sq mi)
- Length: 8 km (5 mi)

Administration
- Canada
- Province: Quebec
- Region: Gaspésie–Îles-de-la-Madeleine
- Municipality: Grosse-Île, Quebec

Brion Island (French: Île Brion, pronounced [il bʁijɔ̃]) is a currently uninhabited island in the Magdalen Islands archipelago in the middle of the Gulf of Saint Lawrence and part of the municipality of Grosse-Île, Gaspésie–Îles-de-la-Madeleine, Quebec, Canada. It is the most northeast of the islands in the Magdalen archipelago, apart from the Bird Rocks (Rochers aux Oiseaux) twenty kilometres (12 miles) east-north-east.

== History ==
Passing by the island in 1534, Jacques Cartier erected his second cross and named the island ille de Bryon after his principal expeditionary patron Philippe de Chabot, Seigneur de Brion and Admiral of France.

== Geography ==
Haldimand Cliff (Falaise Haldimand), named for Frederick Haldimand, is on the southeast coast of the island.

== Natural history ==
Almost the entire island is encompassed by the Réserve écologique de l'Île-Brion. The Bird Rocks Federal Migratory Bird Sanctuary encompasses several small islands to the northwest of Brion Island.

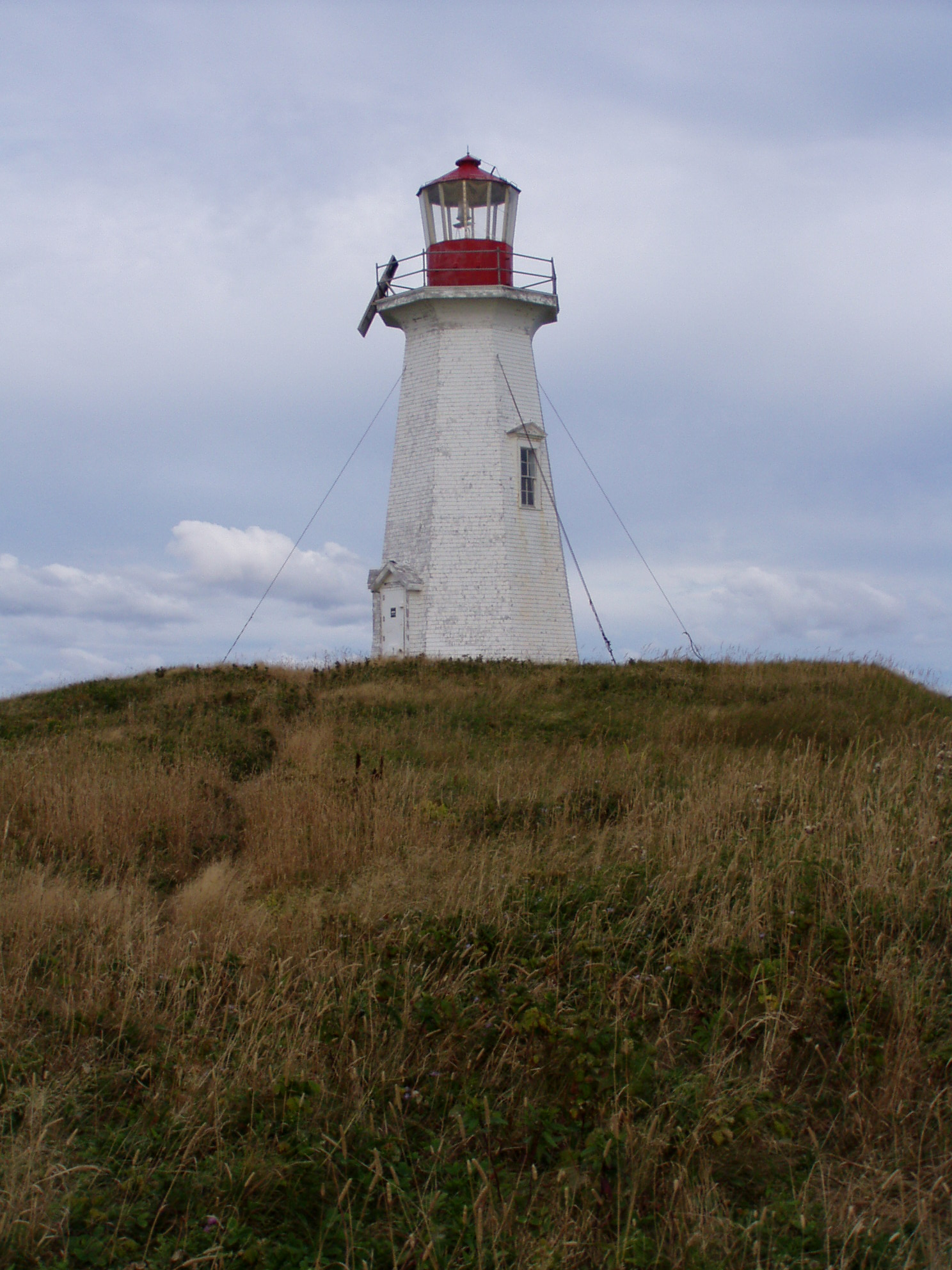
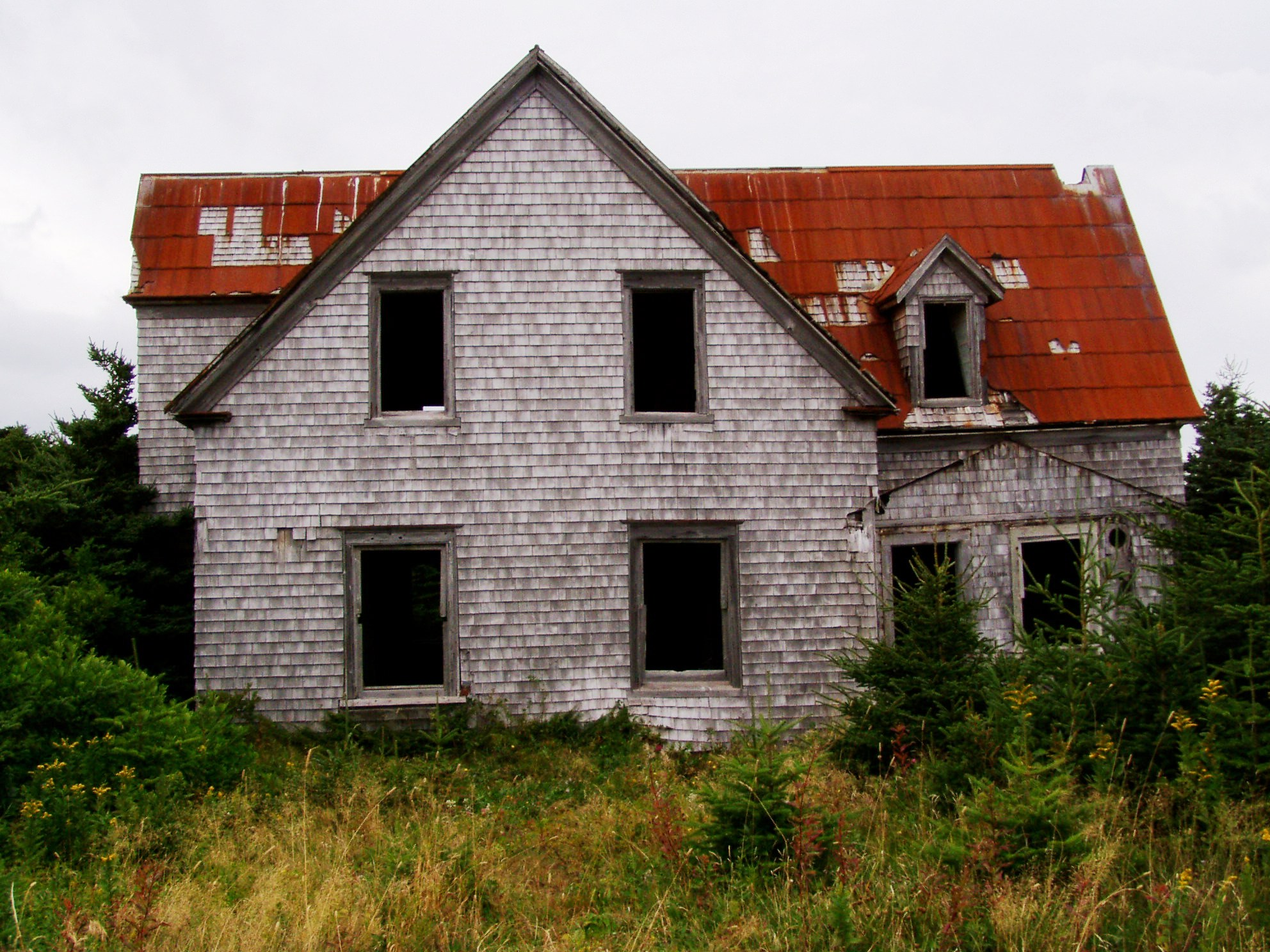
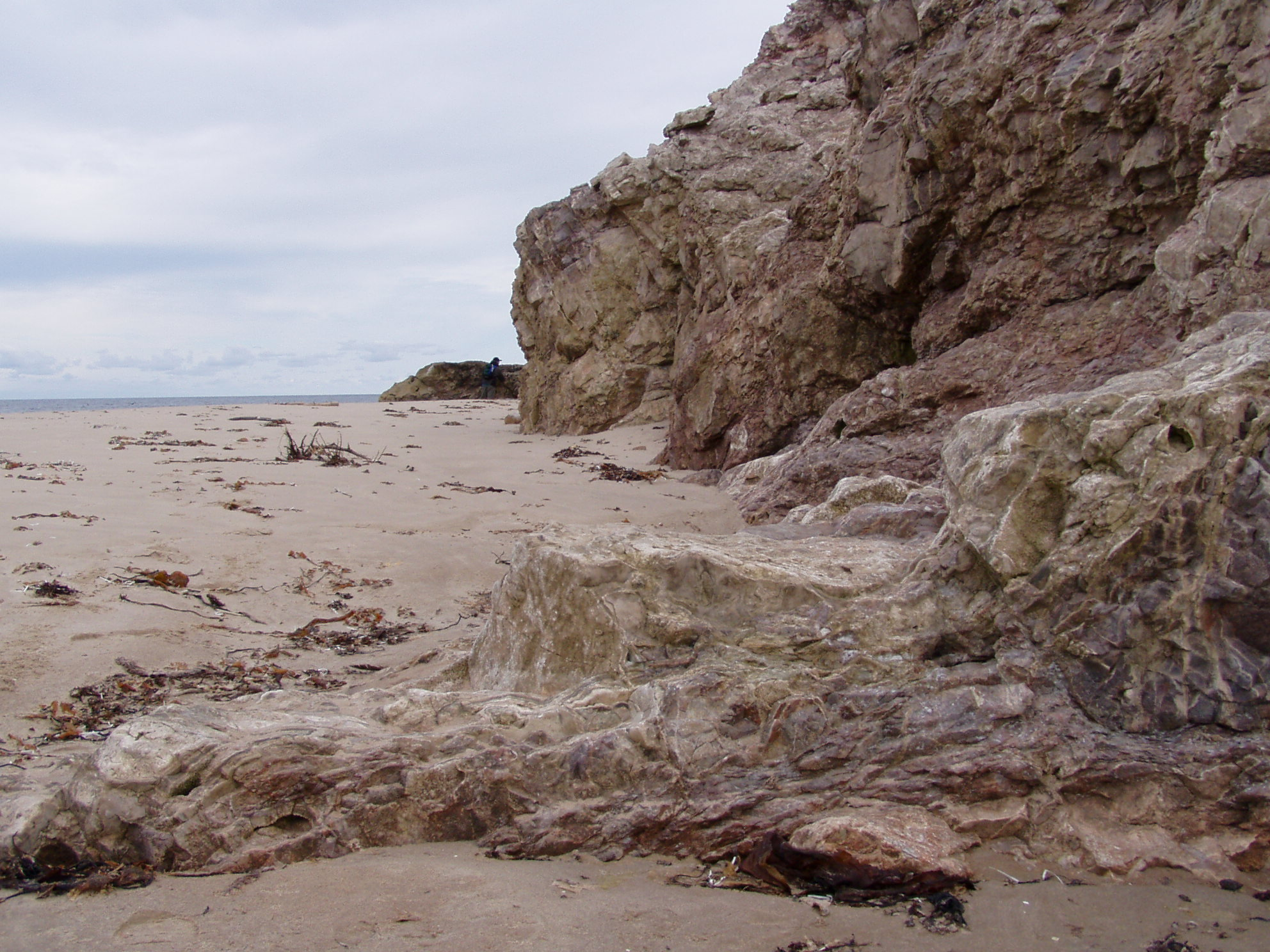
