= Pic de l'Aurore =

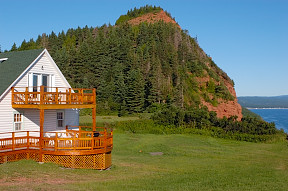

Highest point
- Elevation: 240 m (790 ft)
- Coordinates: 48°32′04″N 64°13′49″W

Geography
- Location: Gaspé Peninsula, Quebec, Canada

The Pic de l'Aurore (Peak o'Dawn or Rosy Peak) is a cliff culminating at about 800 feet at the west entrance of the village of Percé on the Gaspé Peninsula, Quebec, Canada. From its top you can view both the bay of Gaspé up to Forillon National Park, and the bay of Percé including the Percé Rock and the Parc national de l'île-Bonaventure-et-du-Rocher-Percé. The Cliff also shares its name with the Au Pic de l'Aurore Village Chalet, a lodging facility located about 300 feet below the top.
