= Kittie Bruneau =

Canadian artist (1929–2021)

- Born: 12 October 1929; Montreal, Quebec
- Died: 6 April 2021 (aged 91); Calgary, Alberta
- Education: École des beaux-arts de Montréal, Tōshi Yoshida
- Known for: painter, printmaker
- Elected: Royal Canadian Academy of Arts
- Website: www.kittiebruneau.com

Kittie Bruneau RCA (12 October 1929 – 6 April 2021) was a Canadian painter and printmaker.

== Life and work ==
Bruneau was born in Montreal on 12 October 1929. She studied at École des beaux-arts de Montréal from 1946 to 1949. She studied for a year at the Montreal School of Arts under the supervision of Ghitta Caiserman-Roth. As a young woman, Bruneau was torn between the visual arts and dance. Following her studies, she travelled to Paris, where she spent the next ten years. While in Europe, she danced in the corps de ballet for the Ballets de Rouen, and the Ballets de l’étoile of Maurice Béjart. While in France she gave birth to a daughter, Anook.

In 1961, Bruneau moved to Bonaventure Island near Percé, Quebec where she lived and worked until 1972. During that time she had a second daughter, Nathalie. At that time, the Province of Quebec evicted all residents in order to depopulate the island. Her island studio is preserved as part of the Île-Bonaventure-et-du-Rocher-Percé National Park. Afterwards, she worked each summer in a studio on Pointe-Saint-Pierre, a few kilometers from Bonaventure.

Bruneau had a direct approach, using bright colours and a free gestural manner to portray figures and objects combined in compositions that have their roots in the world of poetry and dream. She painted with the canvases on the floor, walking over them as she worked. Her work aligns with surrealism, with some aspects of automatism. Other artists who explore this territory include in Quebec, Alfred Pellan and Jean Dallaire; and internationally, Joan Miró, Paul Klee, and Wassily Kandinsky.

She collaborated with Leonard Cohen, Claude Haeffely, Françoise Bujold, Michaël La Chance and other poets to produce work that combined literature and the visual arts. Between 1982 and 1992, she painted seven murals in various places in Quebec.

Bruneau's work is represented in the collections of the National Gallery of Canada, Canada Council Art Bank, Musée national des beaux-arts du Québec, and the Montreal Museum of Contemporary Art.

Bruneau became a member of the Royal Canadian Academy of Arts. She died at the age of 91 on 6 April 2021.

=== Artist books ===
- 1980 - D’îles et d’ailes (avec poésies de Leonard Cohen, Claude Haeffely, Michaël La Chance, Jacques Renaud, ill. Kittie Bruneau), Montréal, Éditions de la Marotte. np. BNQ|CA/137 RES
- 1974 - Ah ouiche — t'en — plain, poésies de Françoise Bujold, avec des pointes sèches de Kittie Bruneau, Guilde Graphique.
- 1974 - Entre chien et loup (poésies de Michaël La Chance avec ill. Kittie Bruneau), Montréal, La Guilde Graphique, 9 pl. BNQ|RES/CA/38; SIGIRD| 02-1143038.
- 1973 - La Clef de l'envers (poésies de Michaël La Chance avec ill. Kittie Bruneau), Montréal, Éditions de la Marotte, n.p. BNQ|RES/CE/19

== Bibliography ==
- 1999 - Nicole Thérien, Kittie Bruneau, Centre d'exposition du Vieux Palais, Les 400 Coups, 96 p. ISBN 2-89540-002-4
- 1967 - Jacques de Roussan, Kittie Bruneau, préf. Paul Mercier, Lidec, Coll. « Panorama », 36 p.
