= Quiaude =

Québécois fish soup

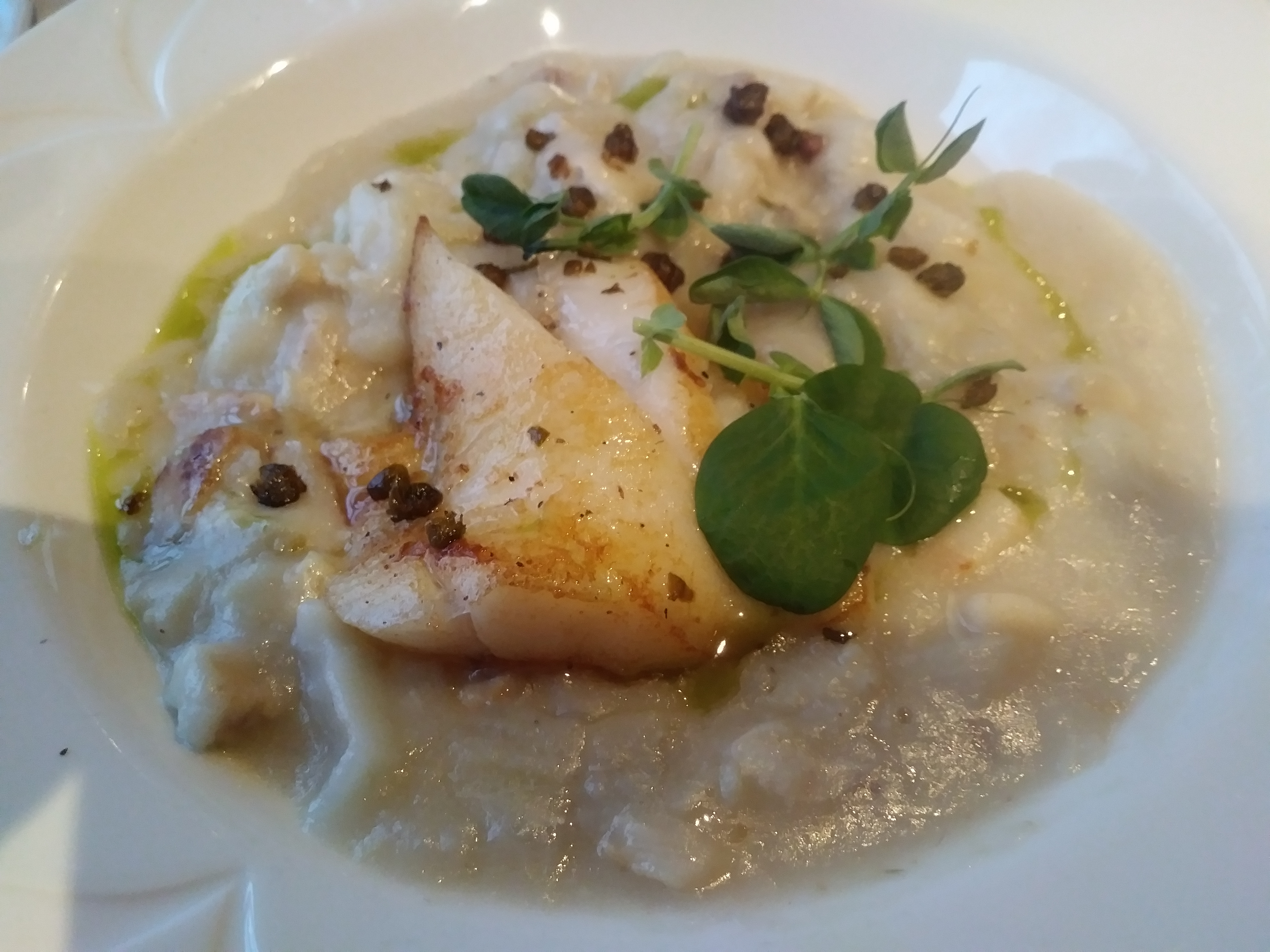
- Quiaude made with turbot
- Alternative names: Kiaude, tchaude, tiasude, quiaule
- Type: Fish soup Chowder
- Course: Entrée, Main course
- Place of origin: Quebec
- Main ingredients: White fish parts (usually cod), lard, potatoes, flour

Quiaude is a thick fish soup or chowder traditionally concocted in Gaspésie and sometimes other parts of Maritime Quebec. It came about because of the region's history of commercial fishing.

== Ingredients and characteristics ==
Quiaude is a soup flavored with the residues left over from salting cod: heads, jowls, livers, nauves (the flesh surrounding the backbone) and tongues. It may also contain bacon, potatoes, turnips and onions. The resulting broth is thickened with flour. Some recipes incorporate butter, or even milk and cream. Pieces of fish may be added, such as turbot, sturgeon or salmon.

== History and etymology ==
Quiaude's precise origins are uncertain. Centuries ago, in Europe, fishermen would often use part of their catch to create nourishing and easily prepared dishes in the form of a thick soup. This has resulted in dishes like bouillabaisse in Marseille and chaudrée in Vendée. It is widely believed that fishermen from Gaspesia and Acadia kept up the same practices and that this is what created quiaude.

In New England, chowder, most notably clam chowder, refers to a similar type of dish. The English name itself probably derives from an adaptation of the French term "chaudrée" or "chaudière". Clam chowder incorporates seafood and is much thicker, using cream and milk.

Etymologically, the name quiaude originates from Oïl speakers north of the Joret line, where the Latin /ka/ was preserved.

On the Magdalen Islands, quiaude is pronounced "tchaude".
