= Maritime Quebec =

Eastern region of Quebec

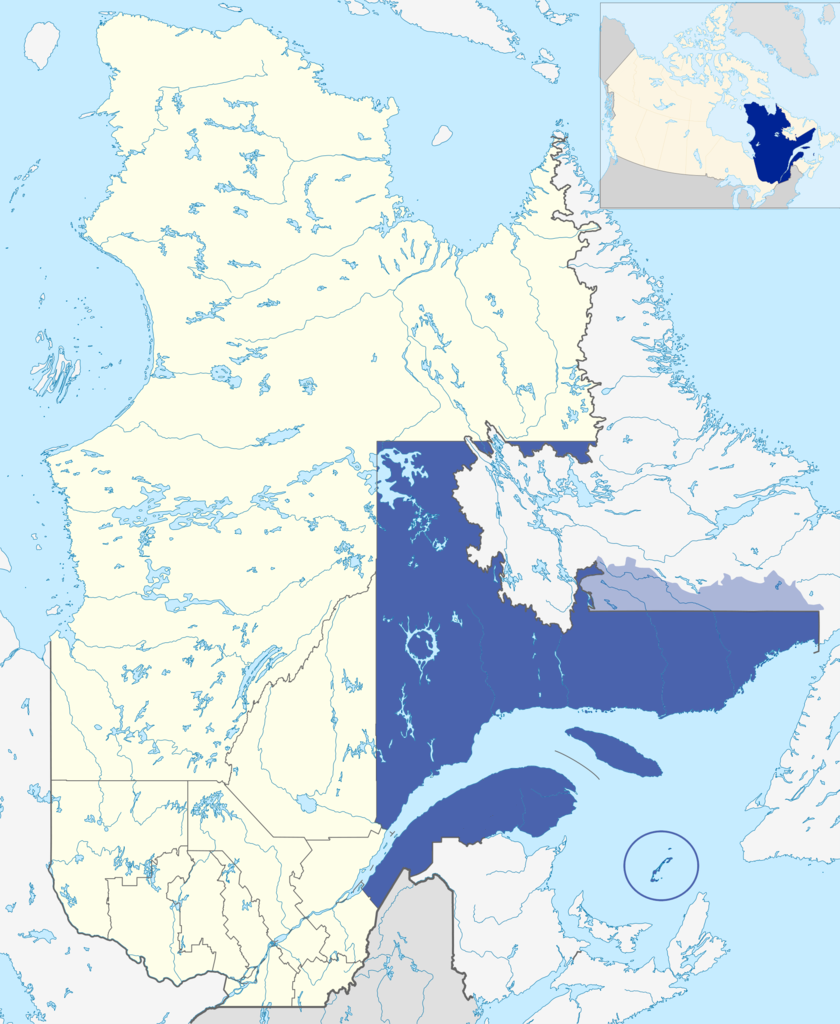
Maritime Quebec in blue

Maritime Quebec is a geographic region in eastern Quebec that borders the Gulf of St. Lawrence. It consists of Gaspesia, Côte-Nord, the Magdalen Islands and Bas-Saint-Laurent. The region's total population is 385,000.

Many localities in Maritime Quebec have a tourism industry that attracts people from other parts of Quebec to its various beaches, trails and tourist attractions during the summertime. Like the Maritime provinces, Maritime Quebec has a more laid-back and small-town culture.

== Parks and Fauna ==
This vast region is home to many trails and parks, including ten national parks. Whalewatching allows tourists to see up to 13 species of whales. The region possesses roughly 50 islands, most of which serve as migratory bird refuges.

== Tourism ==
Maritime Quebec has attracted many tourists during the summer since the 20th century. An organisation called Québec Maritime Inc. has been in operation since 1997 to help attract tourists outside of Quebec to Maritime Quebec. It works in partnership with the Government of Canada, Parks Canada, and more than 200 private enterprises.

== Cuisine ==
Residents of Maritime Quebec are known for making cipaille during the Holidays and for incorporating more fish and seafood into their diets. Some foods are associated with Maritime Quebec, like galvaude poutine (a poutine made with turkey and peas) and Matane shrimp.

== Regions ==
=== Gaspesia ===
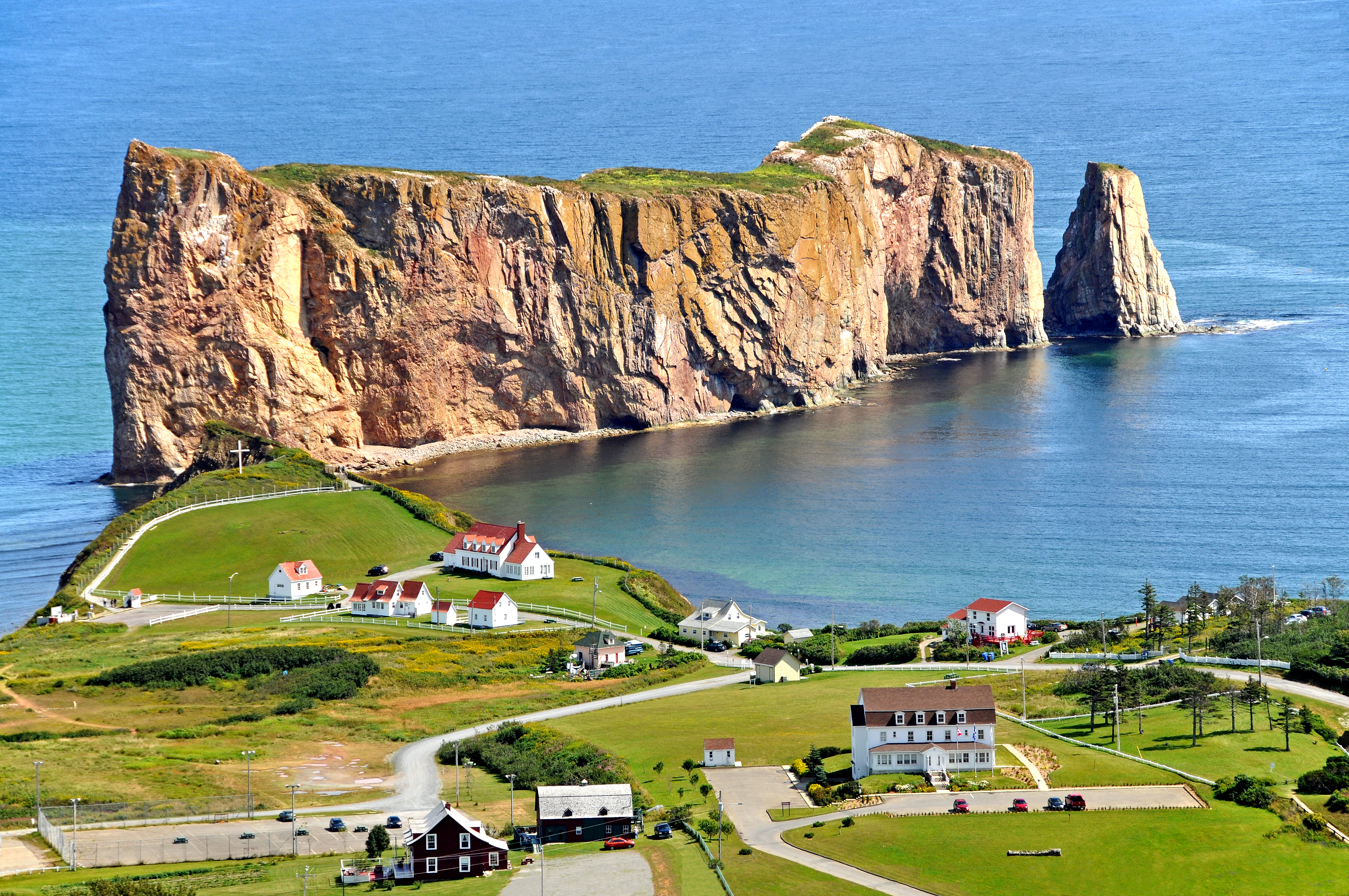
The Percé Rock in Percé

This region is dominated by mixed forest, cliffs and beaches. Gaspesia’s largest city is Matane and most Gaspesians are of French-Canadian, Amerindian, Acadian, British and/or Irish descent. Fishing and agriculture have always been important industries in Gaspesia. Though, in modern times, Gaspesia also now attracts many tourists. Its most well-known attractions are the Percé Rock in Percé, and the cross planted by Jacques Cartier in 1534 in Gaspé when he claimed the land of Canada for France. It is also home to the Baie des Chaleurs, popular for fishing, and the Miguasha National Park, protected for its richness in fossils.

=== Bas-Saint-Laurent ===
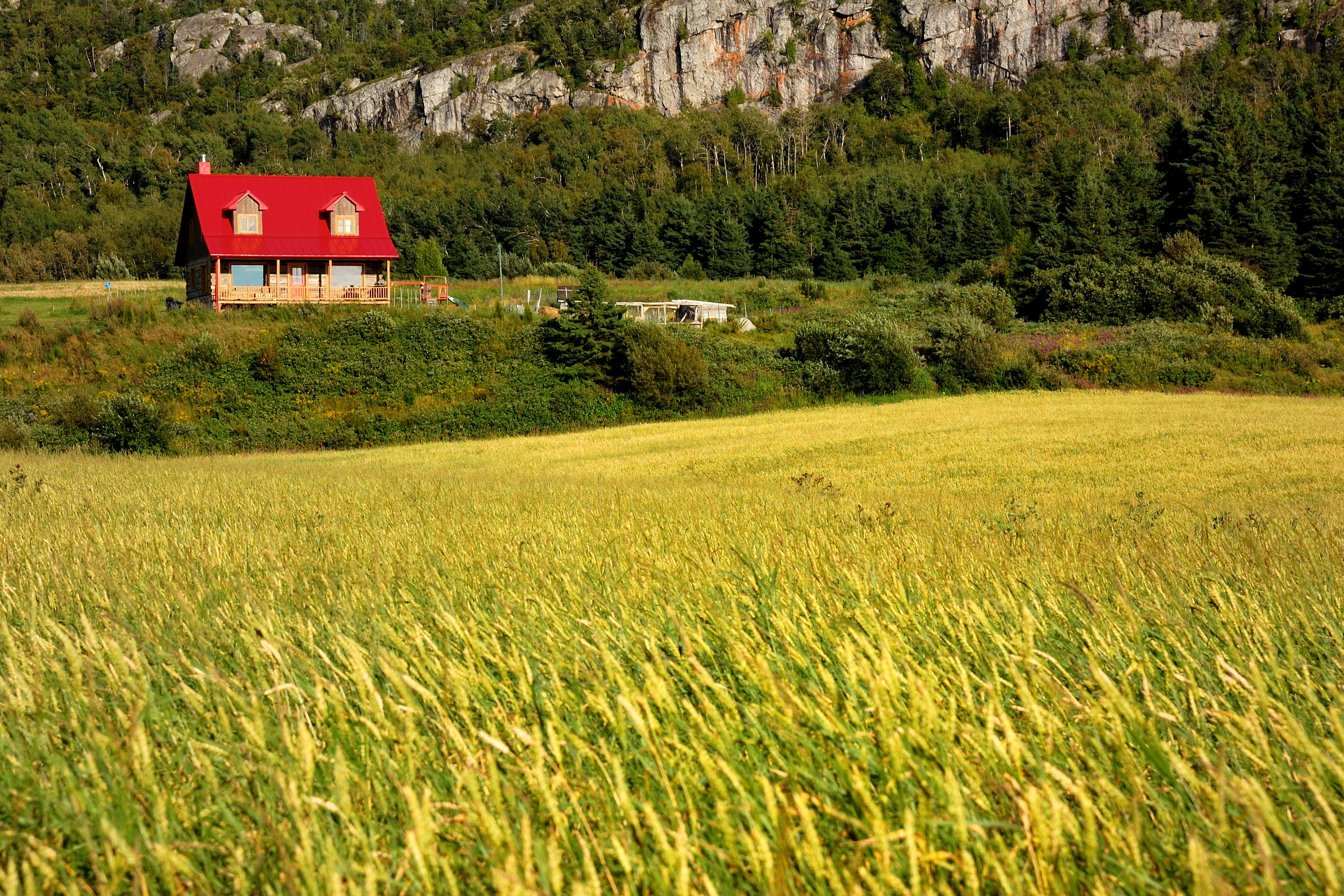
Landscape of Saint-André-de-Kamouraska.

This region is dominated by the Appalachian Mountains except on its northern shore, and its largest city is Rimouski. Here, the economy revolves around education and agriculture. Its shores are visited by many during the summer for their beauty. The region is home to many visitable islands, shipwrecks, and lighthouses.

=== Magdalen Islands ===
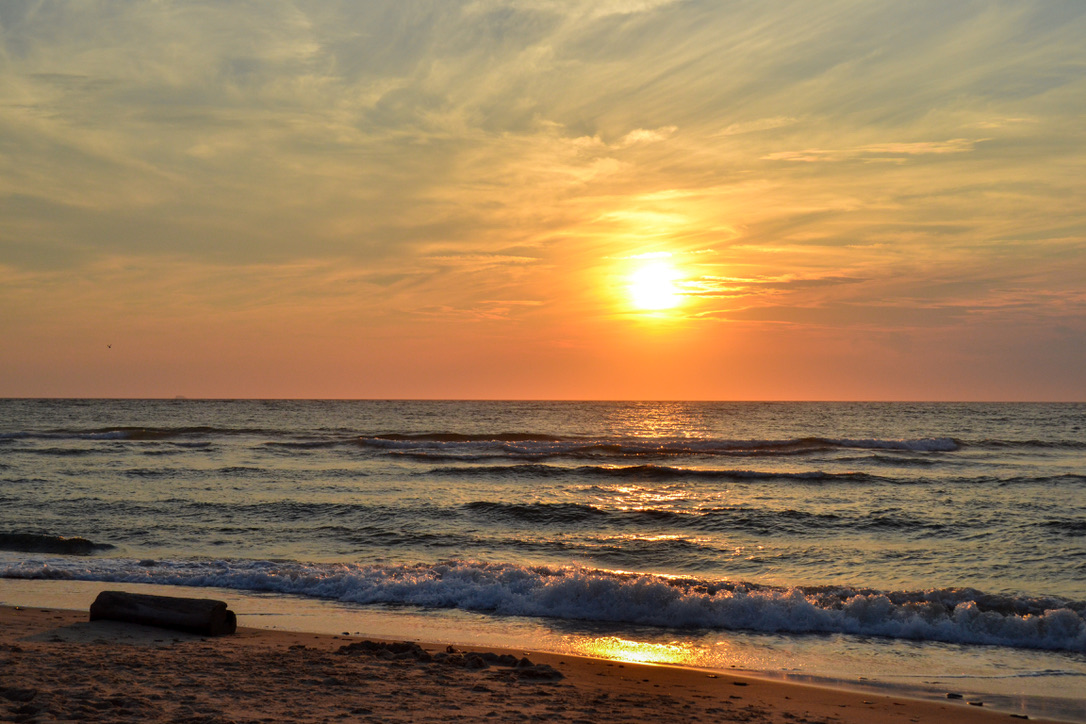
Sunset at the Magdalen Islands.

This seven island archipelago is situated in the middle of the Gulf of St.Lawrence and is only populated by around 13,000 people. All islands are linked together via a road, except for Entry Island - home to 70 people and also the only one of the islands to be primarily anglophone. Its main industry is tourism, though there is also economic activity in mariculture and scientific research related to the Magdalen Islands’ insular ecosystem. The islands are a popular beach destination because of their warm waters and abundant coastline. The islands are home to the Route Verte, the longest bike trail in North America.

=== Côte-Nord ===
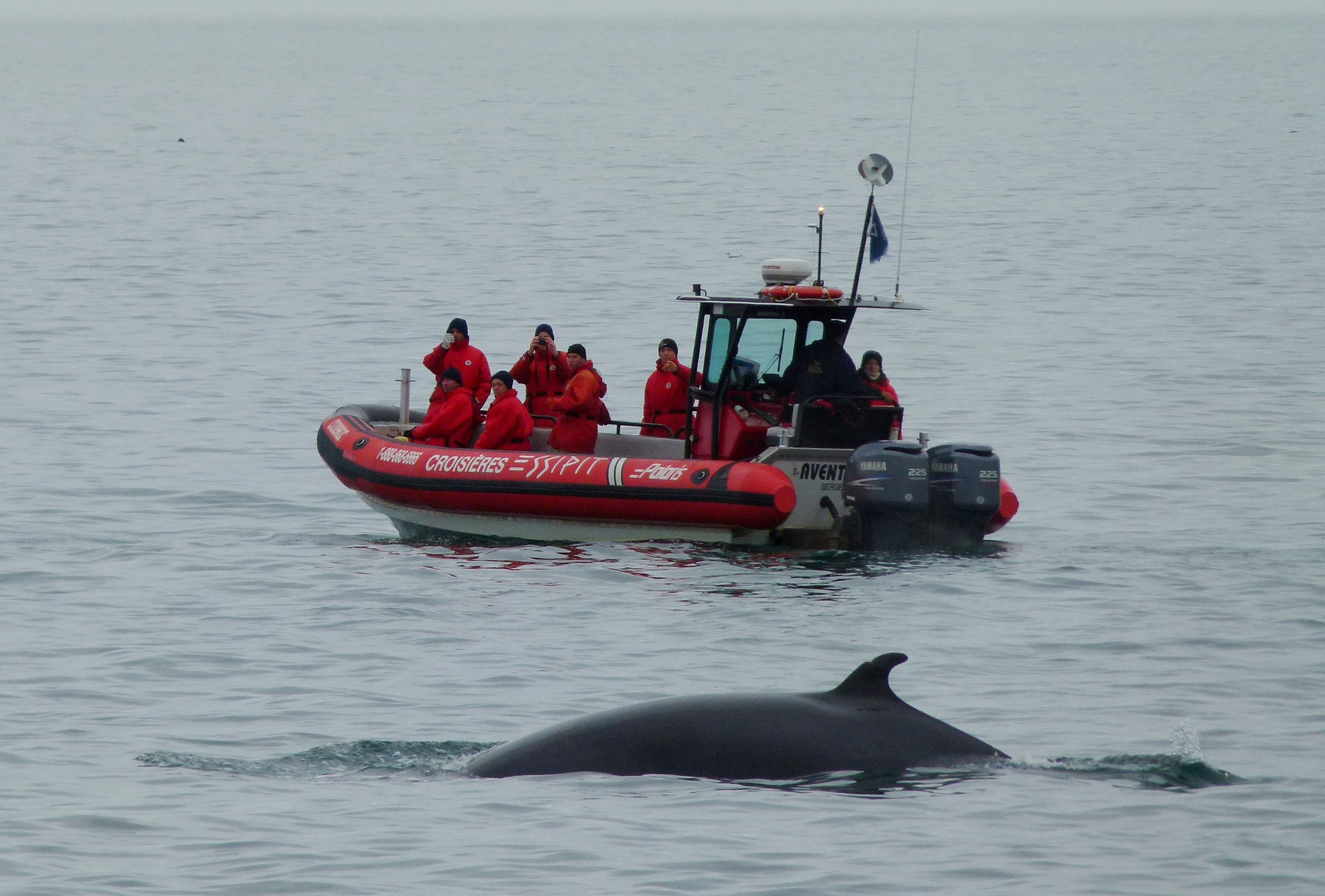
Minke whale close to Tadoussac

This vast region comprises hundreds of kilometers of boreal forest to the north and a coast on the Gulf of St.Lawrence to the south. The largest city is Sept-Îles. Its heavy industry is a vital part of its economy, along with fishing and forestry. This sector, especially in the Duplessis region, has a reputation for its whale watching excursions and fjords.
