= Bonaventure Island =

Island in Quebec, Canada

Native name: Île Bonaventure
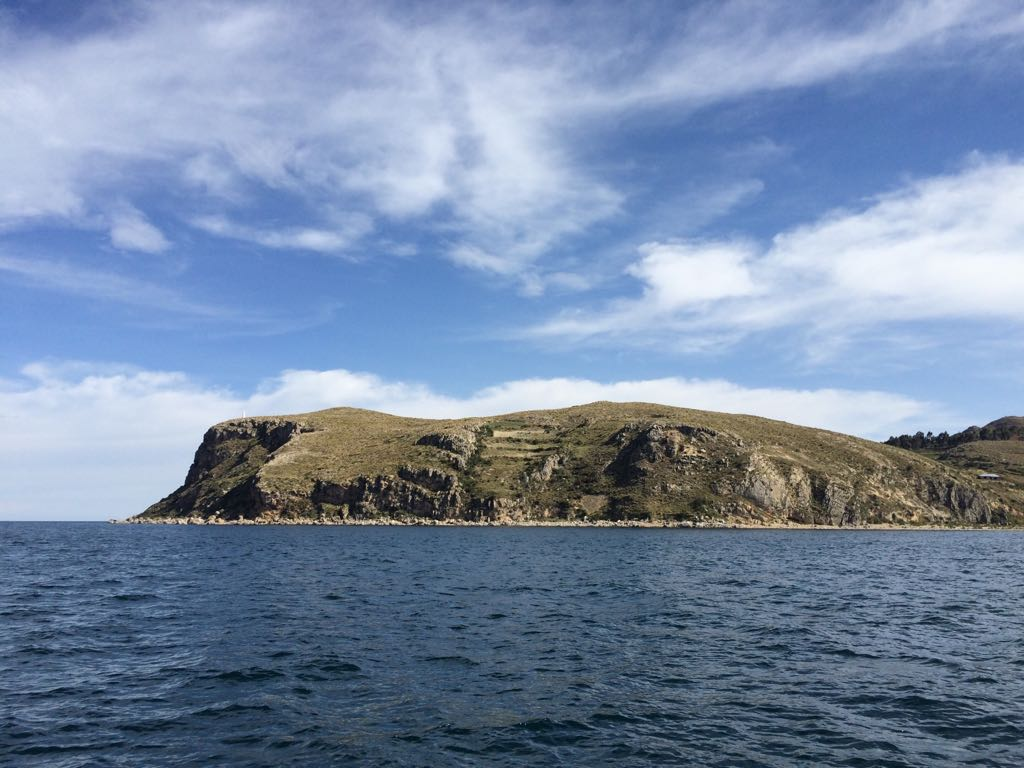
- Bonaventure Island as seen from the sea

- Location in Quebec

Geography
- Location: Gulf of Saint Lawrence
- Coordinates: 48°29′42″N 64°09′54″W
- Area: 4.16 km^{2} (1.61 sq mi)

Administration
- Canada
- Province: Quebec
- Region: Gaspésie–Îles-de-la-Madeleine

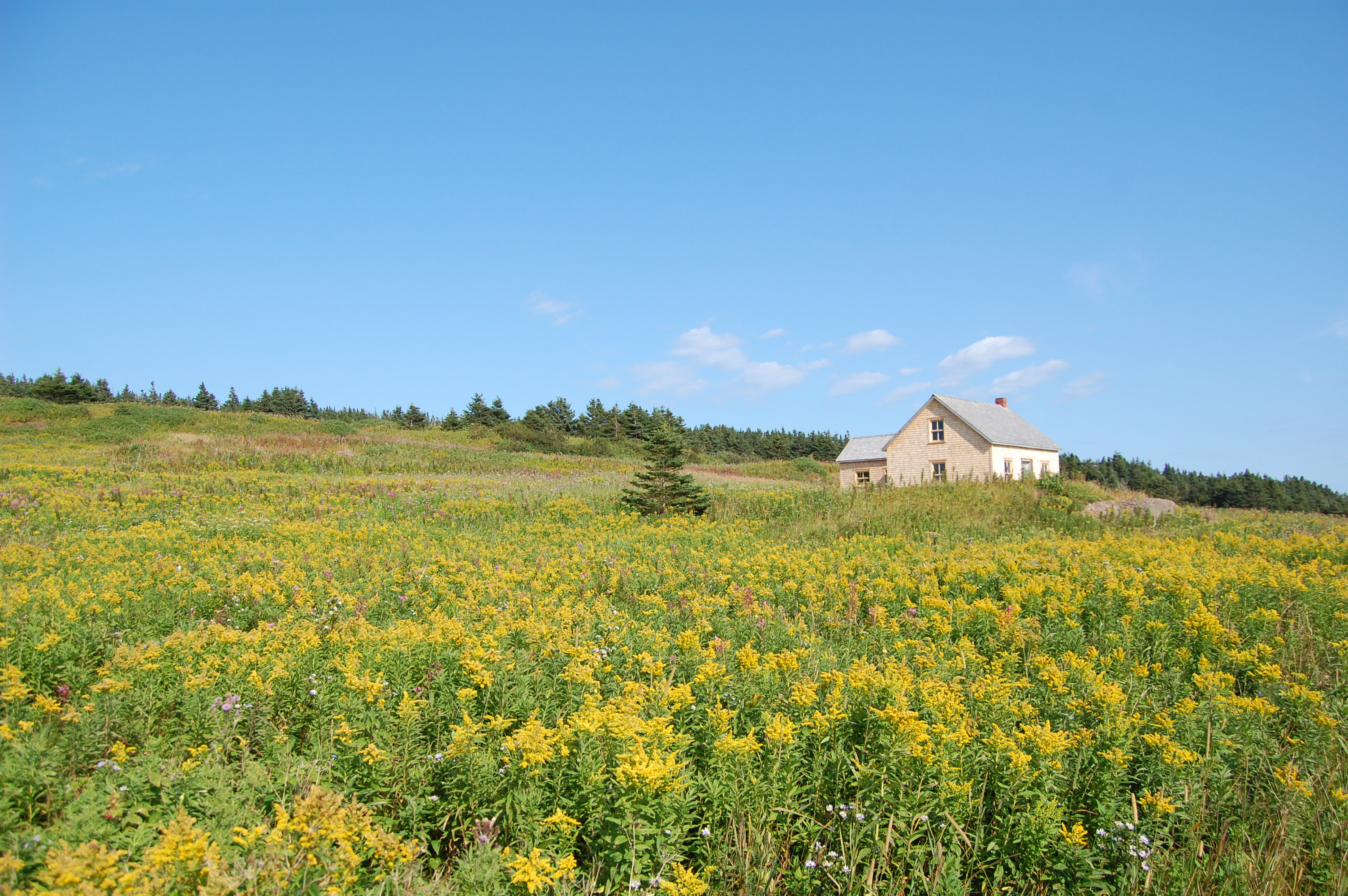
An abandoned homestead on the western side of the island.

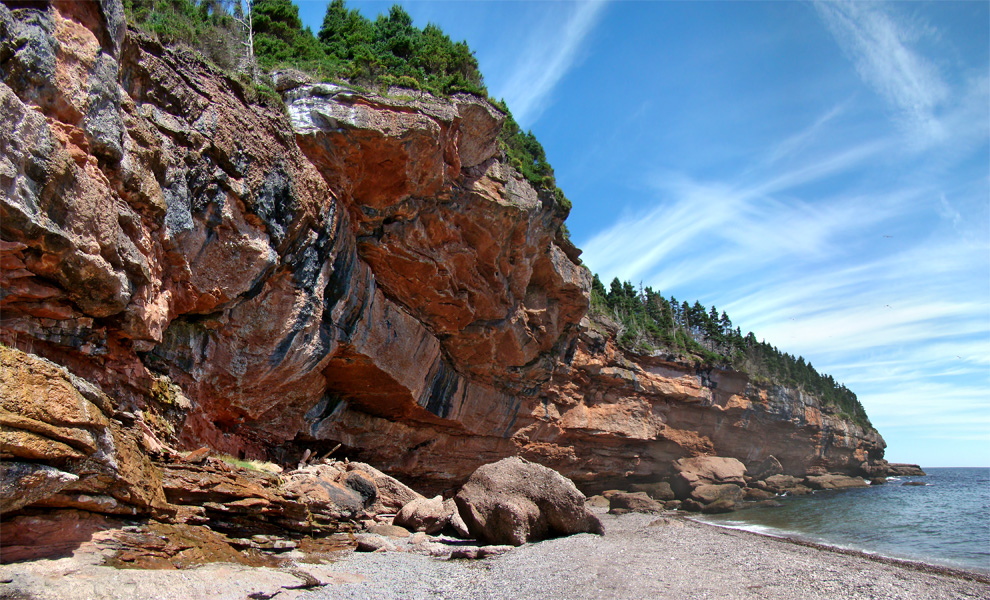
Cliffs overlooking a rocky beach.

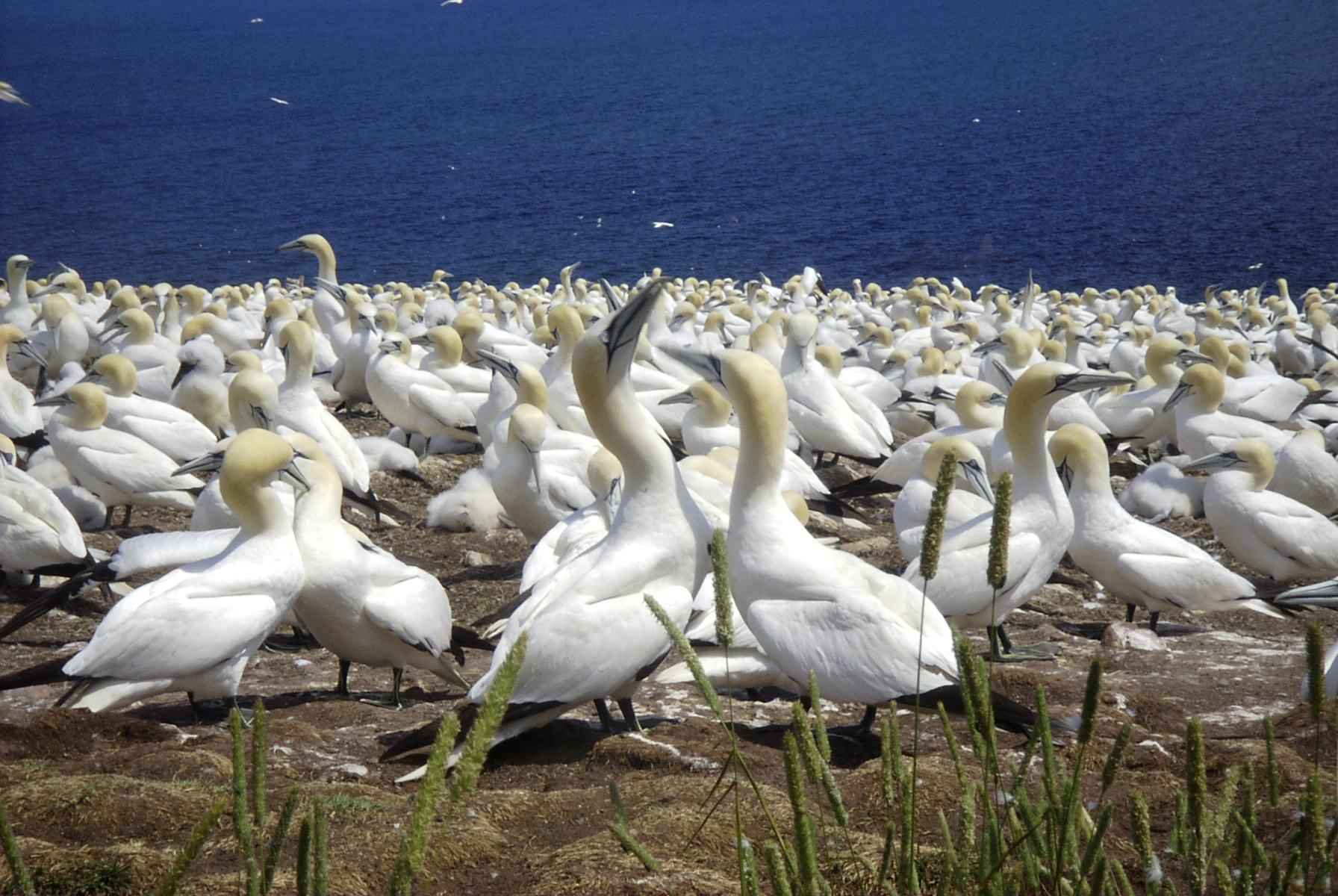
Northern gannets on Bonaventure Island.

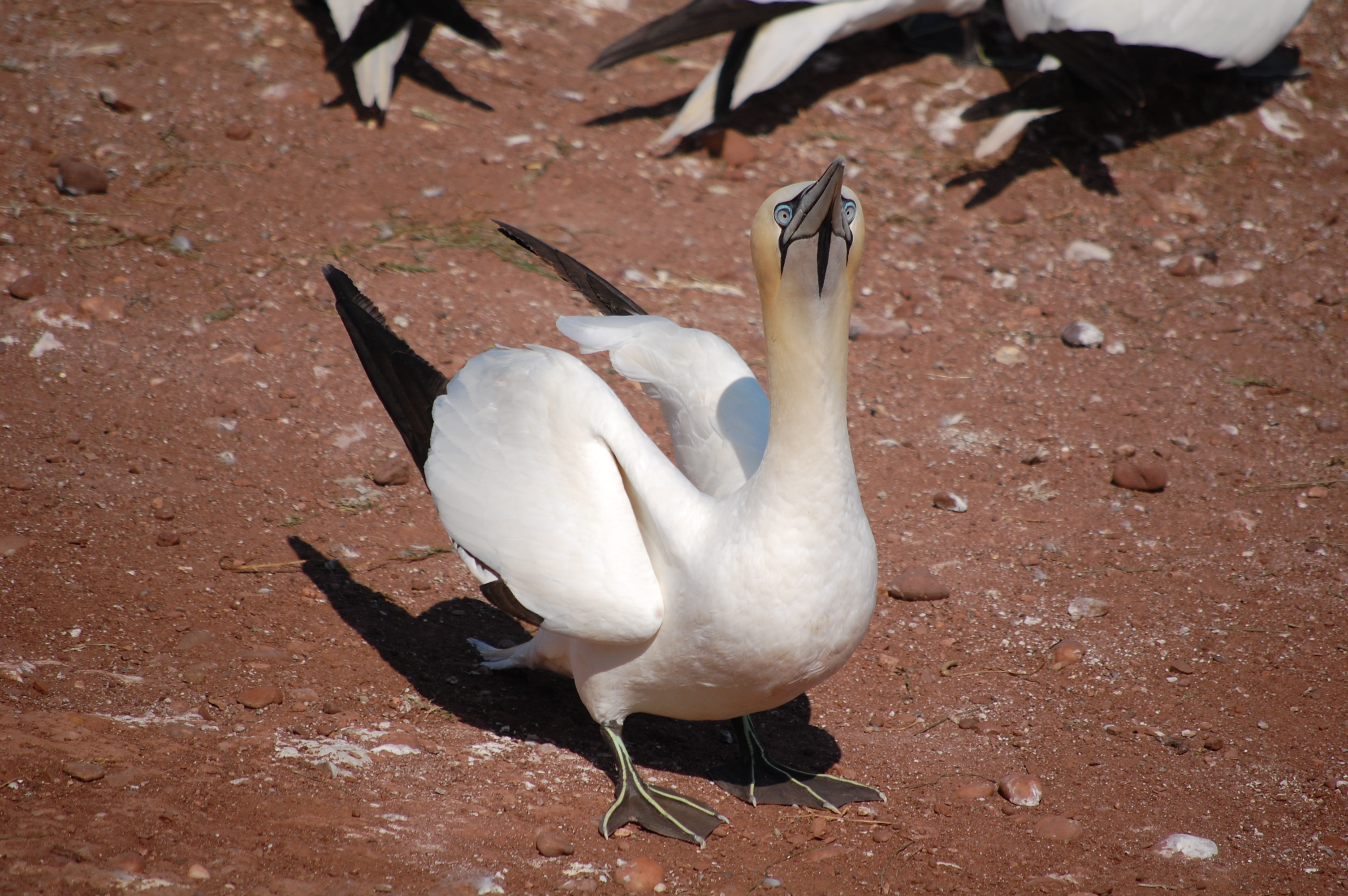
A northern gannet on the island.

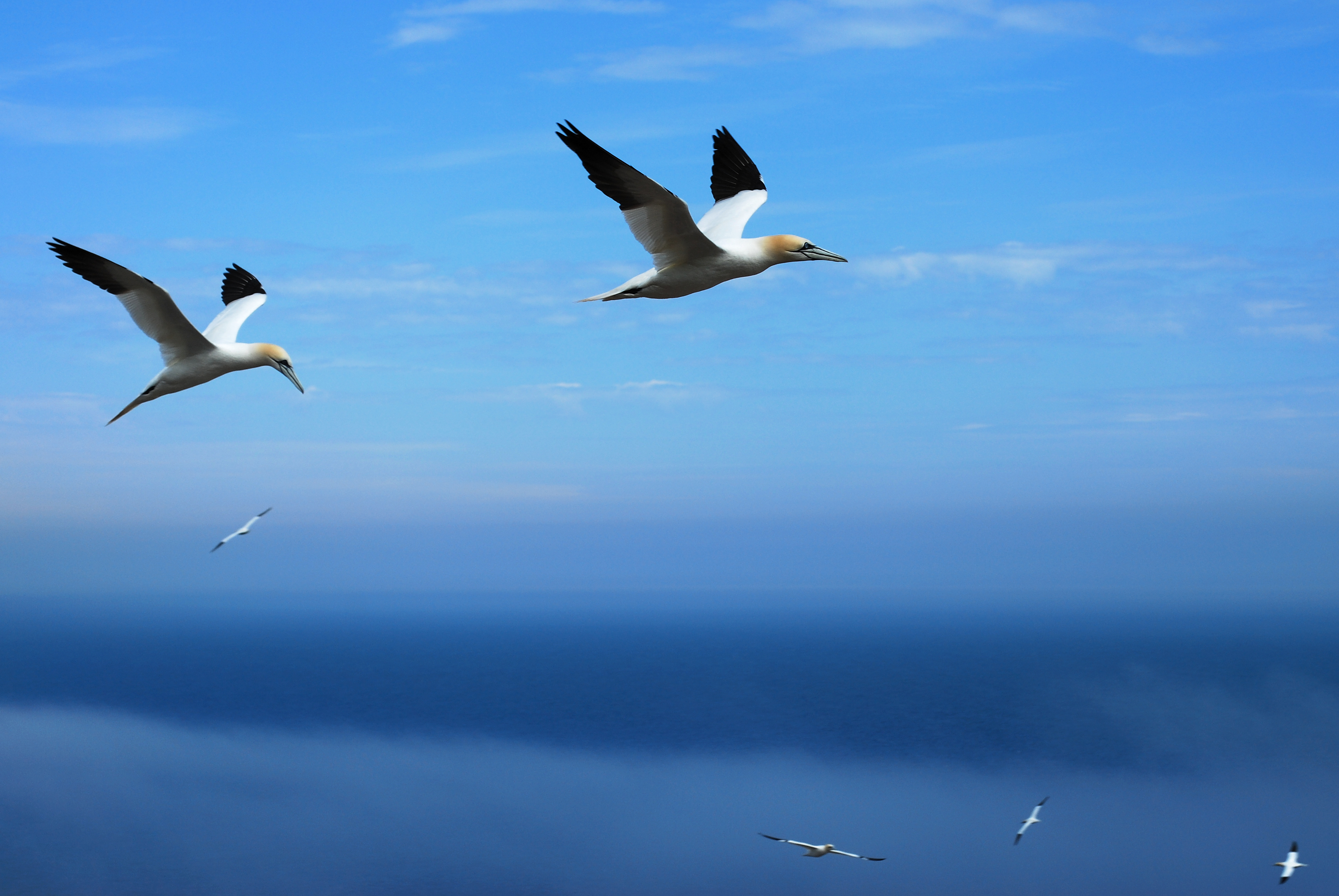
Northern gannets in flight.

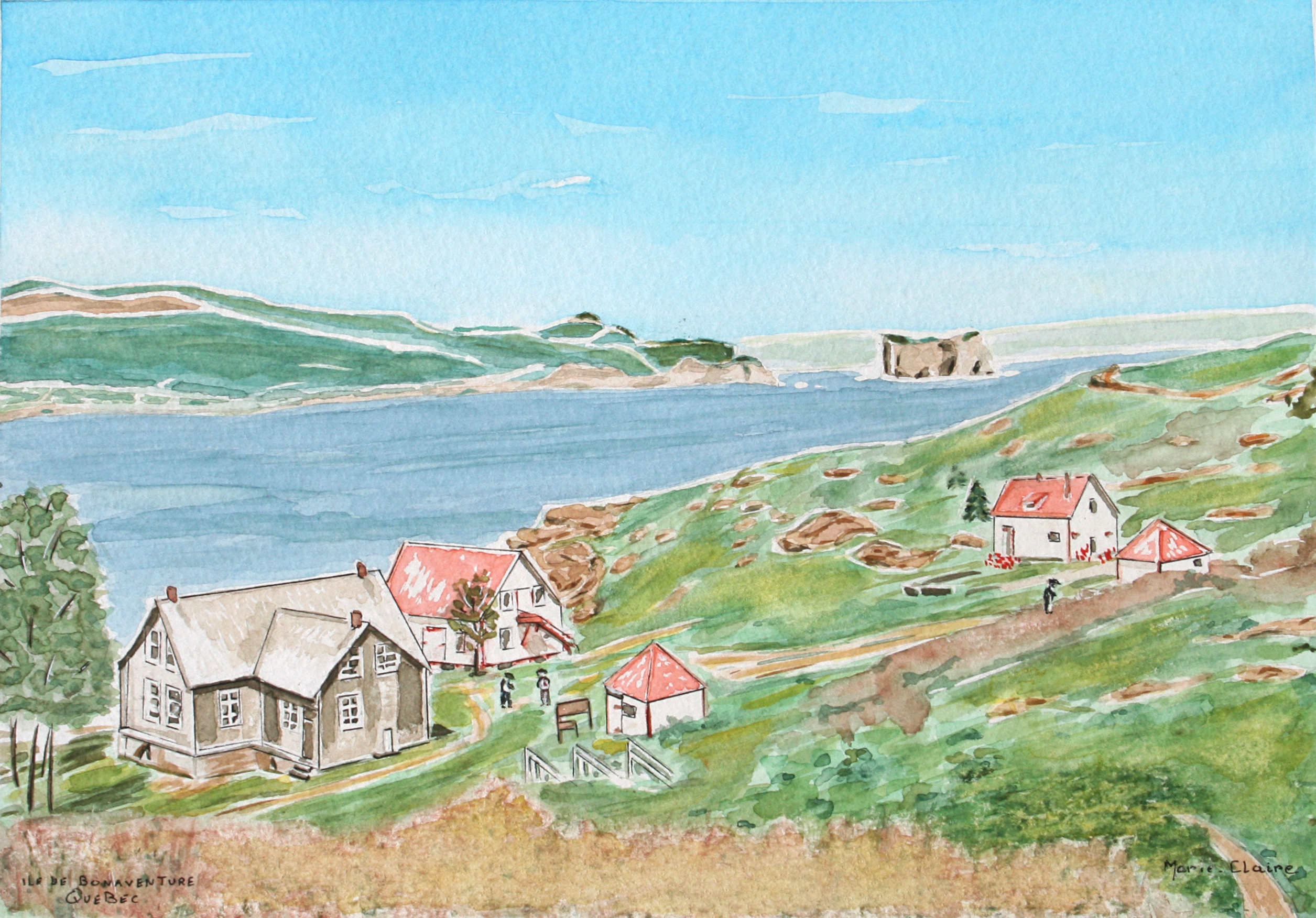
Bonaventure Island and Percé Rock.

Bonaventure Island (officially in French: île Bonaventure [il bɔnavɑ̃tyʁ]) is a Canadian island in the Gulf of St. Lawrence located 3.5 km (2.2 mi) off the southern coast of Quebec's Gaspé Peninsula, 5 km (3.1 mi) southeast of the village of Percé. Roughly circular in shape, it has an area measuring 4.16 km^{2} (1.61 sq mi).

== History ==
Bonaventure Island (Île Bonaventure), with Percé, was among the early seasonal fishing ports of New France, and was associated with the lineage of Nicolas Denys. Settlers from southern Ireland came in the early 1790s. Peter Du Val, a native of Jersey, established a fishery company on lot number one before 1819, population rose to an apex, but the company endured until 1845.

The island became a migratory bird sanctuary in 1919 due to the 1916 Migratory Bird Convention between Canada and the United States. The Province of Quebec acquired ownership of the entire island by act of expropriation in 1971, evicting the whole population. At this time approximately 35 families were forced to move elsewhere, all residents were evicted. Later the Province of Quebec grouped it together with Percé Rock into the Parc national de l'île-Bonaventure-et-du-Rocher-Percé (Bonaventure Island and Percé Rock National Park) in 1985. One of the largest and most accessible bird sanctuaries in the world, with more than 280,000 birds, Bonaventure Island is a major tourist destination with boat and island tours from May to October.

The aircraft carrier HMCS Bonaventure was named after the island.

== Birds ==
218 different species of birds have been recorded as visiting, migrating to, or living on Bonaventure island.

The most common bird found on the island is the northern gannet. The island is home to one of the largest colonies of gannets in the world, with 51,700 pairs in 2011. Other populous colonies include the black-legged kittiwake and the common murre. Terns, black guillemots, herring gulls, great black-backed gulls, razorbills, Leach's storm-petrels, great cormorants, double-crested cormorants, Atlantic puffins, boreal chickadees and blackpoll warblers can also be observed on Bonaventure.

== Poetic landmark ==
Bonaventure Island has been an important source of inspiration to numerous artists and poets. The surrealist writer André Breton declared that, while working on his novel Arcane 17, as he stayed in Percé (1944), he would never tire watching the birds of the Island. The island never ceased attracting painters and writers: the American painter Frederick James (d. 1905), Franco-Germans Claire et Yvan Goll (1946)—by the 1960s several artists would spend the summer on the island, and would stay over the summer with the inhabitants—descendants of Irish and Norman settlers—the best known of whom was the naturalist William Du Val. Among these inspired visitors: painter Jacques Hurtubise and Kittie Bruneau, the sculptor Morton Rosengarten, the poet Michaël La Chance. Artists and landowners were evicted in the 1970s.

== See also ==
- List of islands of Quebec
