= Île-Bonaventure-et-du-Rocher-Percé National Park =

National park of Quebec, Canada

- IUCN category III (natural monument or feature)
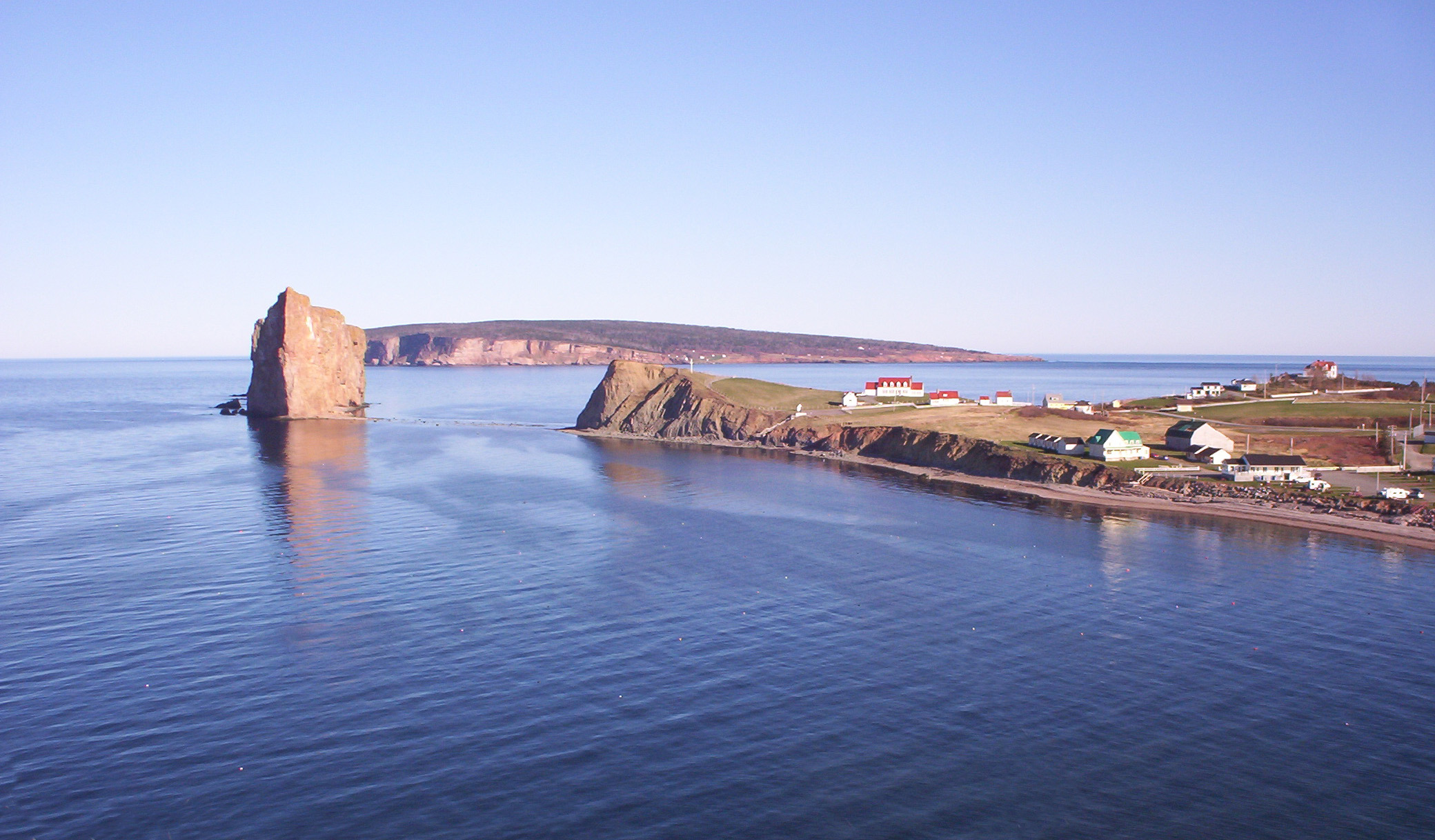
- Percé Rock and village
- Interactive map of Île-Bonaventure-et-du-Rocher-Percé National Park
- Location: Percé, Le Rocher-Percé Regional County Municipality, Quebec, Canada
- Coordinates: 48.4964°N 64.1619°W
- Website: http://www.sepaq.com/pq/bon/index.dot?language_id=1

Île-Bonaventure-et-du-Rocher-Percé National Park (French: Parc national de l'île-Bonaventure-et-du-Rocher-Percé, pronounced [paʁk nɑsjɔnal də lil bɔnavɑ̃tyʁ e dy ʁɔʃe pɛʁse]) is a provincial park of Quebec, Canada.

The park is located at the tip of the Gaspé Peninsula near the village of Percé, Quebec, and was created in 1985 to protect the large migratory bird sanctuary found on Bonaventure Island, as well as nearby Percé Rock just off the mainland. The park's area covers 5.8 km^{2}, of which only a small portion is located on the mainland.

Boat and island tours are offered from May to October. The island features five hiking trails. Park wardens and naturalists also offer guided bird, fossil and geology walks and tours.

The park's main interpretation centre is located on the mainland in Percé, in a restored building known as Le Chafaud. The exhibits focus on the park's bird colonies, marine life, ecosystem, geology and history. There are about 250,000 birds in the park.
