= Percé Rock =

Rock formation off the coast of Québec, Canada

Percé Rock Rocher percé
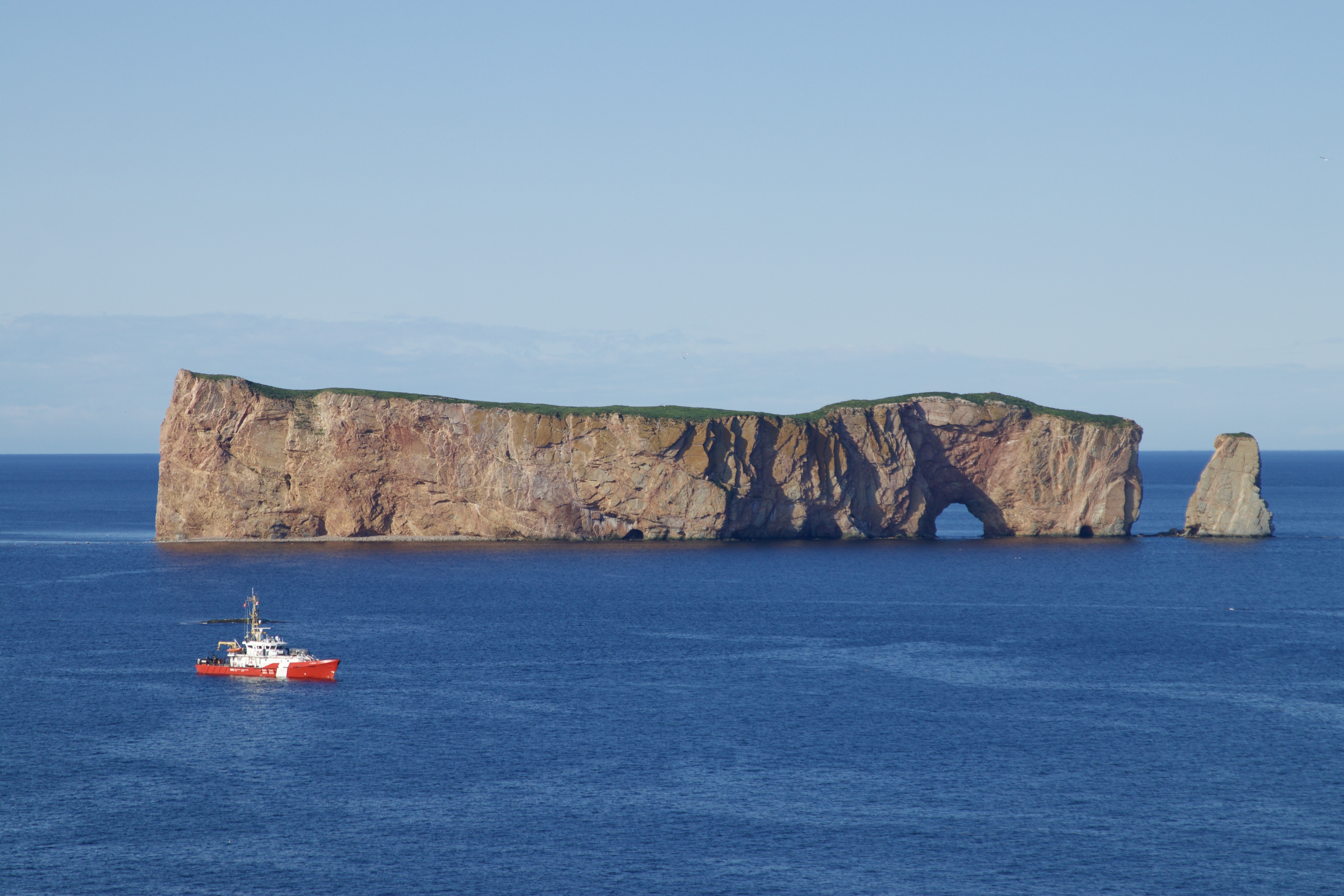
- Percé Rock in 2025

Highest point
- Elevation: 88 m (289 ft)
- Coordinates: 48°31′26″N 64°11′58″W

Geography
- Location within Quebec
- Location: Percé, Quebec, Canada

Percé Rock (French: Rocher Percé, pronounced [ʁɔʃe pɛʁse], lit. 'Pierced Rock') is a huge sheer rock formation in the Gulf of Saint Lawrence on the tip of the Gaspé Peninsula in Quebec, Canada, off Percé Bay. Percé Rock appears from a distance like a ship under sail. It is one of the world's largest natural arches located in water and is considered a geologically and historically rich natural icon of Quebec. It is a major attraction in the Gaspésie region.

== Etymology ==
The massive rocky cliff is called by several names, such as le Rocher Percé, Pierced Rock, Pierced Island, Split Rock or Percé Rock. The name is attributed to the pierced rock that forms an arch 15 metres (49 ft) high on its seaward southern end, as though a needle had cut through the rock. It was named Percé ("pierced rock") by Samuel de Champlain in 1607, in reference to the holes he had seen in the massive block of limestone, which over the years has become a major attraction in the province of Quebec.

== Legend ==
The Percé Rock, described as "the monstrous giant; pierced through by an immense eye, now green, now gray, now blue or violet, according to the moods of the sea", is linked in legend to a young man of a noble French family.

Another version of the legend, which is also narrated by the local people of Percé town, is that they see the rock in the shape of a "phantom" during storms and hence call it "Le Génie de l'Isle Percée". This, however, could be interpreted to mean that the vapoury clouds that engulf the "vast flocks of water fowl" could give such an impression when viewed from a distance.

== Geography ==
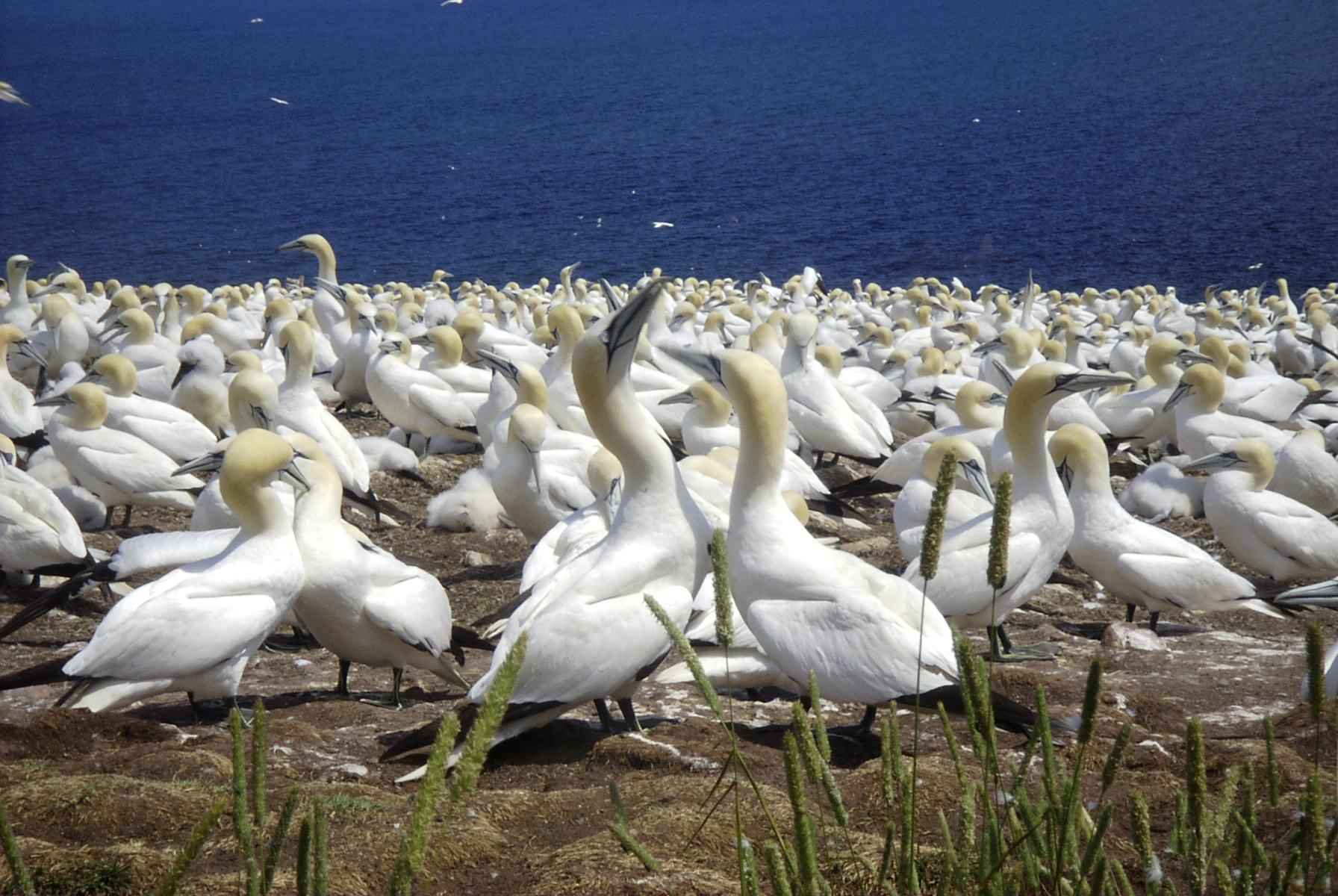
Northern gannets on Bonaventure Island and also seen on Percé Rock

Percé Rock is part of the range of cliffs, bays and hills on the southwest side of the Gulf of Saint Lawrence, which are formed of reddish-gold limestone and shale. It is linked to mainland (at Rue du Mont Joli) by a sandbar at low tide. The Bay of Perce is situated between this rock and the High Head. There is a reef to the southwest of Percé Rock, about 0.5 miles (800 m) away from the shore. The town of Percé is located on the shores of the bay. Its main industry is fishing. Percé reef is about 0.5 miles (800 m) from the centre of the town where small vessels can be moored. Midway across the rock is a shoal that stretches over a length of 0.25 miles (400 m).

The rock formation has about 150 fossil species. In Bonaventure Island where the park is situated, conglomerates from the Carboniferous period of more than 310 million years are recorded.

Next to the rock is Bonaventure Island, and together they form Parc national de l'Île-Bonaventure-et-du-Rocher-Percé (Bonaventure Island and Percé Rock National Park), founded in 1985, which covers an area of about 5.8 square kilometres (2.2 sq mi). The tip of the Gaspé Peninsula has five geological formations, and Percé Rock is the only one located within the park. The park extends over a 2 kilometres (1.2 mi) stretch of the coastline, and exhibits a wide variety of flora and fauna. It is a migratory bird sanctuary for the northern gannet, and has over 110,000 nesting birds, the second largest in the world. (The Municipal website of Percé mentions that the population of northern gannets is 121,000, which exceeds the figures mentioned for the archipelago of St Kilda in Scotland.) Other birds found on the island include puffins, razorbills, black guillemot and kittiwakes, as well as over 200 other species. From May to December, some species of blue whale, humpback whale, minke whale or fin whale can be seen along the coast near Percé, Bonaventure Island and Forillon National Park.

At low tide, the rock is approachable on foot. The rock and the bird colony in Bonaventure Island is about a 75-minute trip from Percé by boat. Visits to the rock are restricted to the period from May 28 to October 12. During such visits, park guides provide information on beach creatures, the geology of Percé Rock, also called the "cathedral of limestone that rose from the Equator", and the fossils found there. The rock mass is a monolith estimated at 5 million tonnes. It has been inferred that at the current erosion rate (about 300 tonnes of mass per year lost to the action of water and wind), it will disappear in about 16,000 years. In view of its tendency to collapse, it is dangerous to venture close to the rock on foot during low tide. The top of the rock is not accessible because of its height. Snowy gannets, silvery gulls, black cormorants and other species of birds perch there.

An interpretation centre in Percé, housed in Le Chafaud, an elegant restored building, has a thematic exhibition titled "Un rocher, une île, un parc national", meaning "one rock, one island, one national park", which recounts the bird life, marine life, geology, history and ecosystem of the park and the rock.

== Description ==
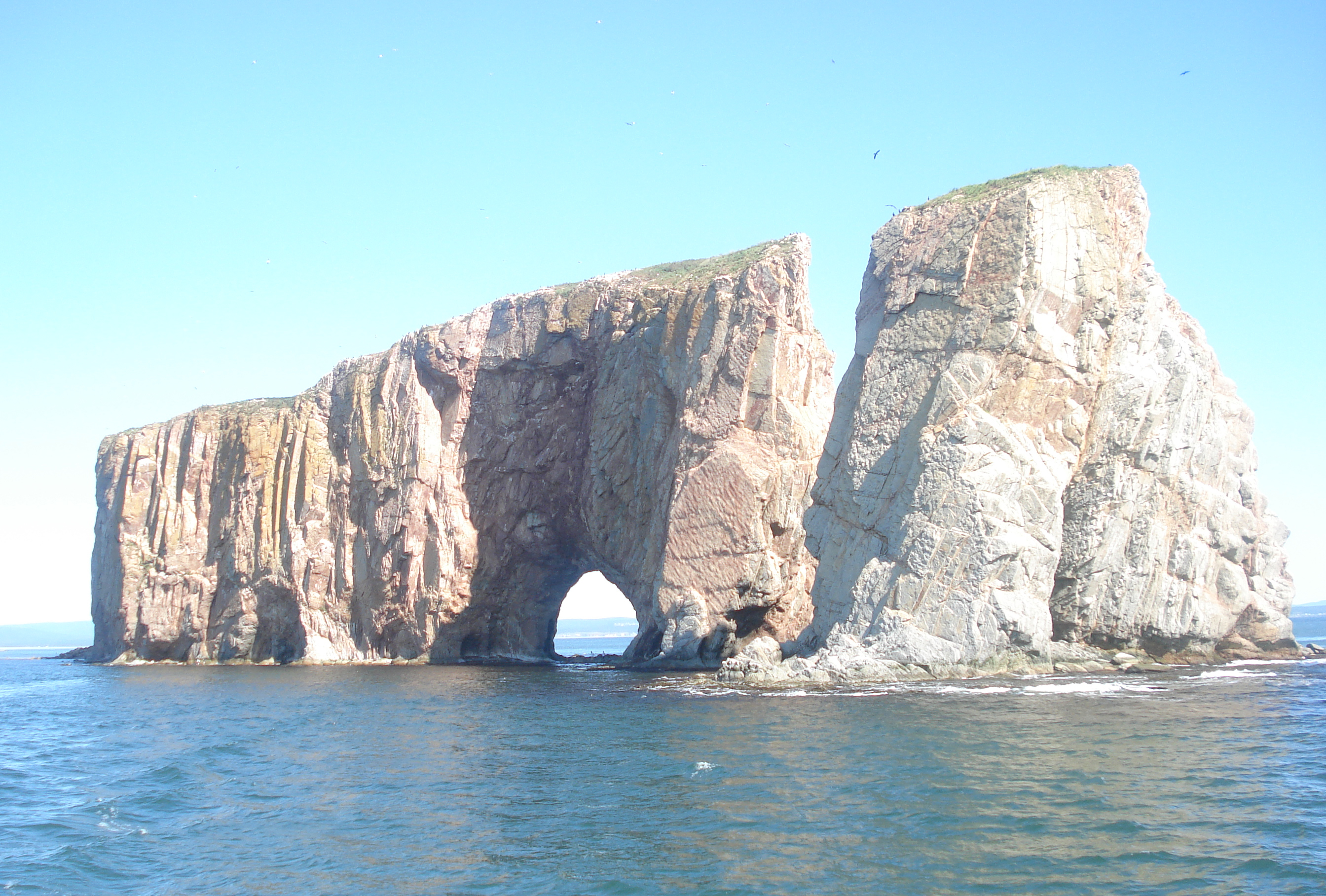
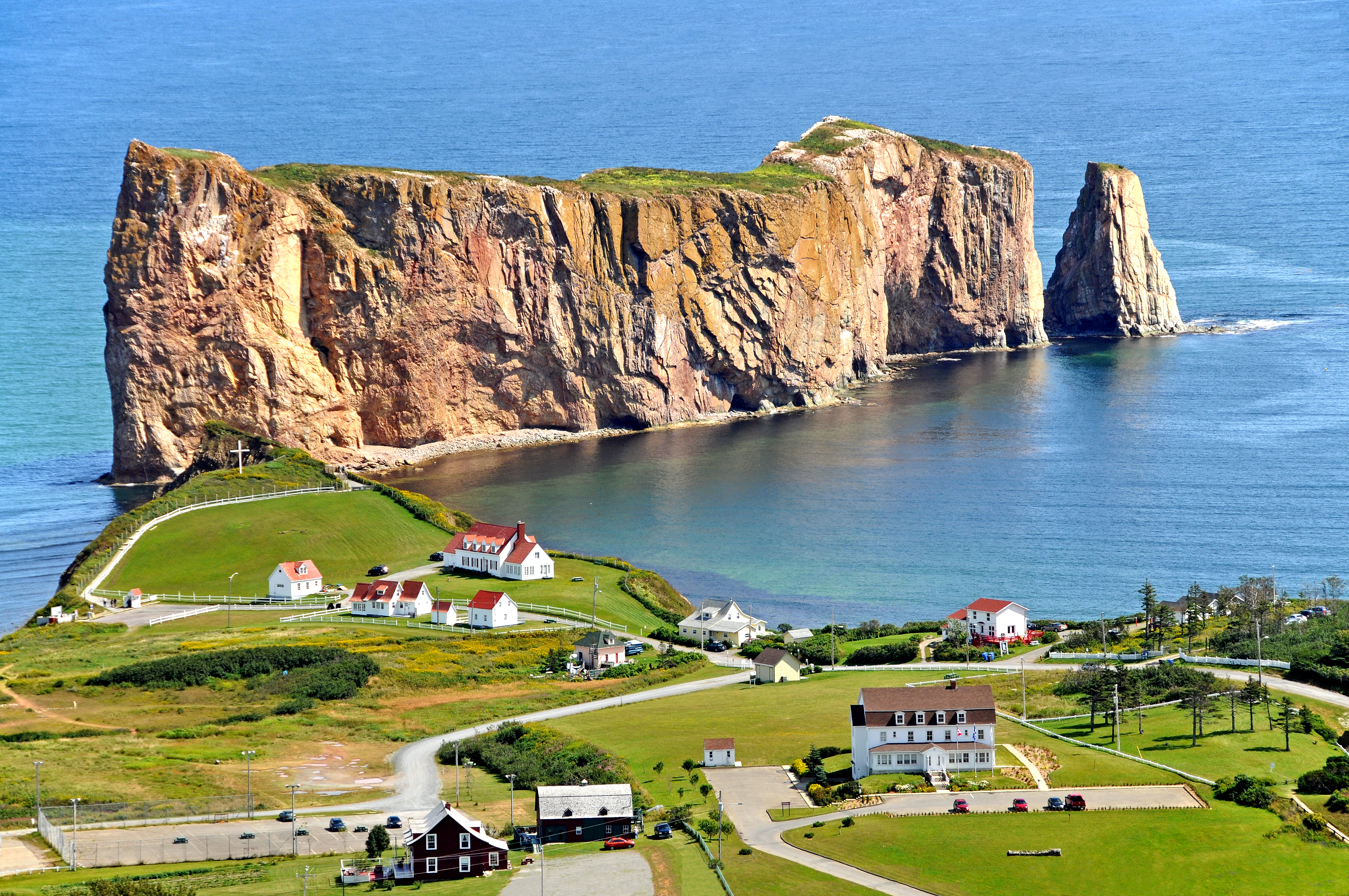
Left: Arch of 20 m height through the Perce rock. Right: View of the Percé village in front of the Percé Rock, seen from Mont Saint-Anne.

Percé Rock is a massive siliceous limestone stack formation, with sandstone and siltstone veins, with steep rock faces on all sides. It is 433 metres (1,421 ft) long, 90 metres (300 ft) wide, and 88 metres (289 ft) high at its highest point. It is described as a narrow bluff emerging out of the sea, "resembling a beached supertanker from some angles". For four hours at a time during low tide, the water recedes from a wide spit that allows the rock itself to be visited.

== History ==
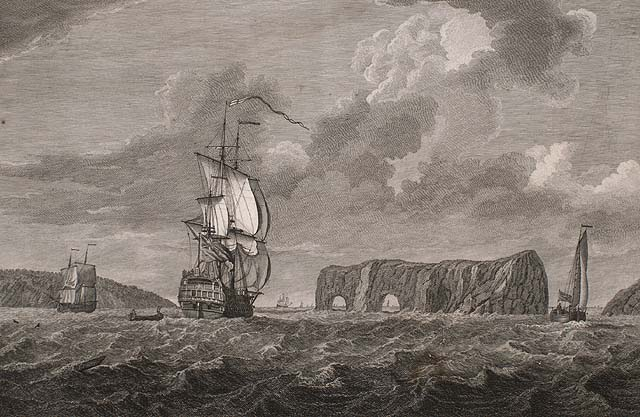
Print title: "A view of the Pierced Island, a remarkable rock in the Gulf of St. Laurence—two leagues to the southward of Gaspée Bay" drawn by Captain Hervey Smyth, 1760; engraved by Pierre Charles Cannot 1768. Note there are two arches

Percé Rock's huge limestone formation is geologically dated to the Devonian period of more than 400 million years ago (375 million years is also mentioned). However, Percé Rock is only a small component of the large areas of Devonian rocks that occupy the interior that were first mapped in 1844 by Sir William Edmond Logan, known as the father of Canadian geology. Fossils in such rocks show a variety of animal and plant communities from both terrestrial and marine habitats from the Devonian period. The Percé Rock contains 150 species of different fossils such as brachiopod, trilobites, dalmanites, corals and marine worms from the Devonian period.

Originally, the Percé Rock was inferred as connected to the main land. When Jacques Cartier, the first colonist, arrived here in 1534, he reported three arches in the massive rock formation. In time, two of the arches disappeared, with the last one collapsing on June 17, 1845, leaving a separated pillar. When it was seen in 1603 by the French geographer and founder of Quebec City, Samuel de Champlain, it had only one arch. However, in 1760, a picture of Percé Rock drawn by an English officer, Captain Hervey Smyth, showed two arches, one of which collapsed in June 1845. Percé rock's two large holes were cut through by the sea waves. One of the holes seen now is an arch described as "gothic arch of rock", which is about 15 metres (49 ft) high. A small boat can pass through the arch during high tide. Of the two arches, the outer arch, which collapsed with great force in 1845, remains in the form of an "obelisk". In early 1900s, enchanted by the beauty of the Percé Rock, travellers started visiting the area of Gaspe, Percé and Bonaventure Island.

== In popular culture ==
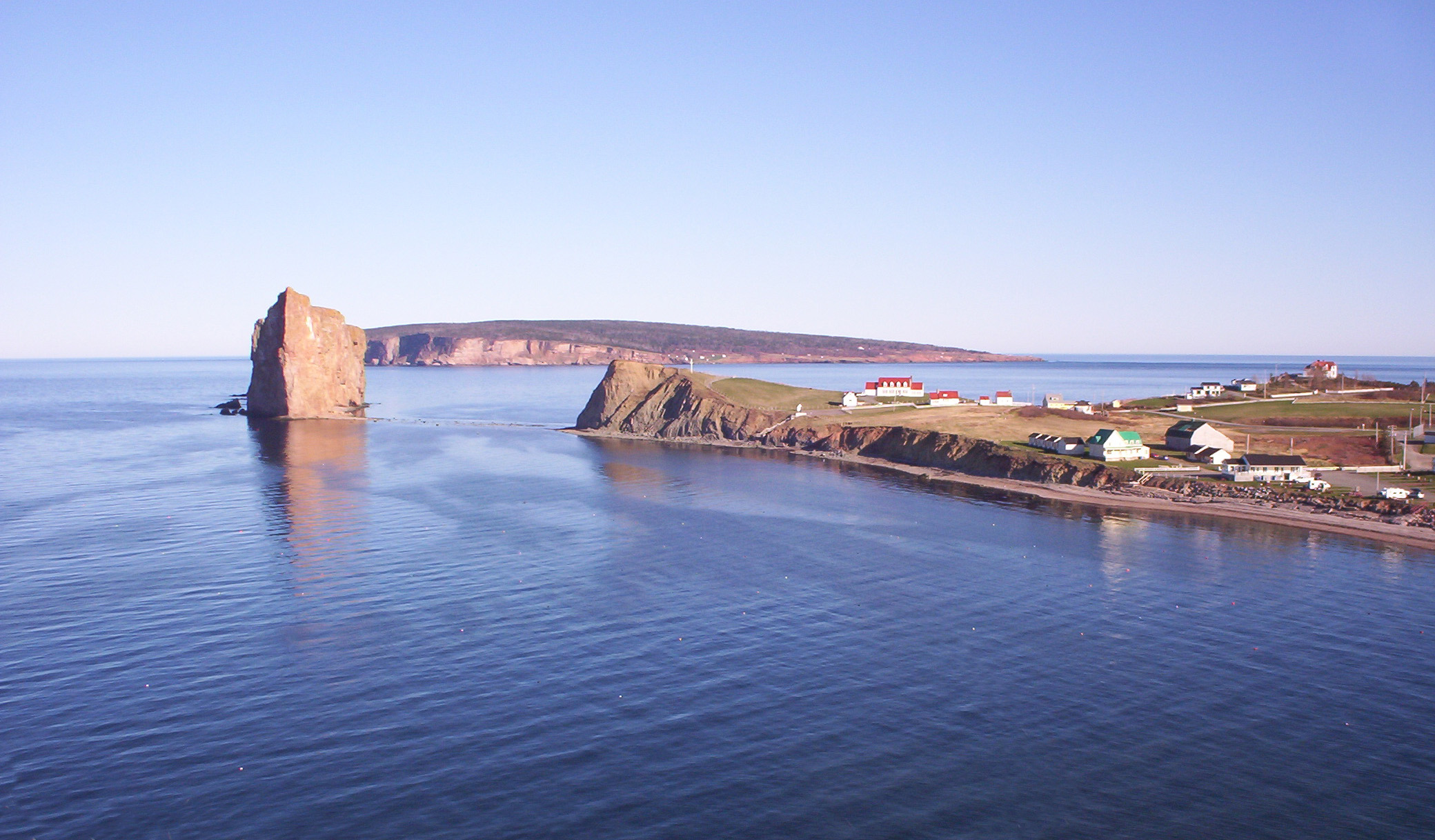
Percé village, Percé Rock and the Parc national de l'île-Bonaventure-et-du-Rocher-Percé (Bonaventure Island and Percé Rock National Park)

Percé Rock is a major tourist attraction in Quebec, with picturesque views of the rock from both Percé and nearby Bonaventure Island.

French surrealist poet André Breton (1896–1966) visited Gaspé in October 1944 and recorded his impressions of the visit in Arcanum 17, "a hymn of hope, renewal, and resurrection". The name of the poem stands for the 17th tarot card in the Major Arcana, called the Star, which symbolizes a woman pouring lunar forces into a mundane world and represents negative connotations of loss or abandonment of hope or bright prospects. During the visit, Breton was attracted to the Percé Rock and drew inspiration from it. In contrast to his unhappy personal life in war-torn Europe, the Rock provided him with the inspiration and reminder that "nature renews herself and that death is only transitory." He called Percé Rock a "razor blade rising out of the water, an image very imperious and commanding, a marvelous iceberg of moon stone ... to a distracted observer though to a common man it is just but a resting place of birds".

== See also ==
- Durdle Door
- Roche Percee
