= Percé, Quebec =

Percé
- City
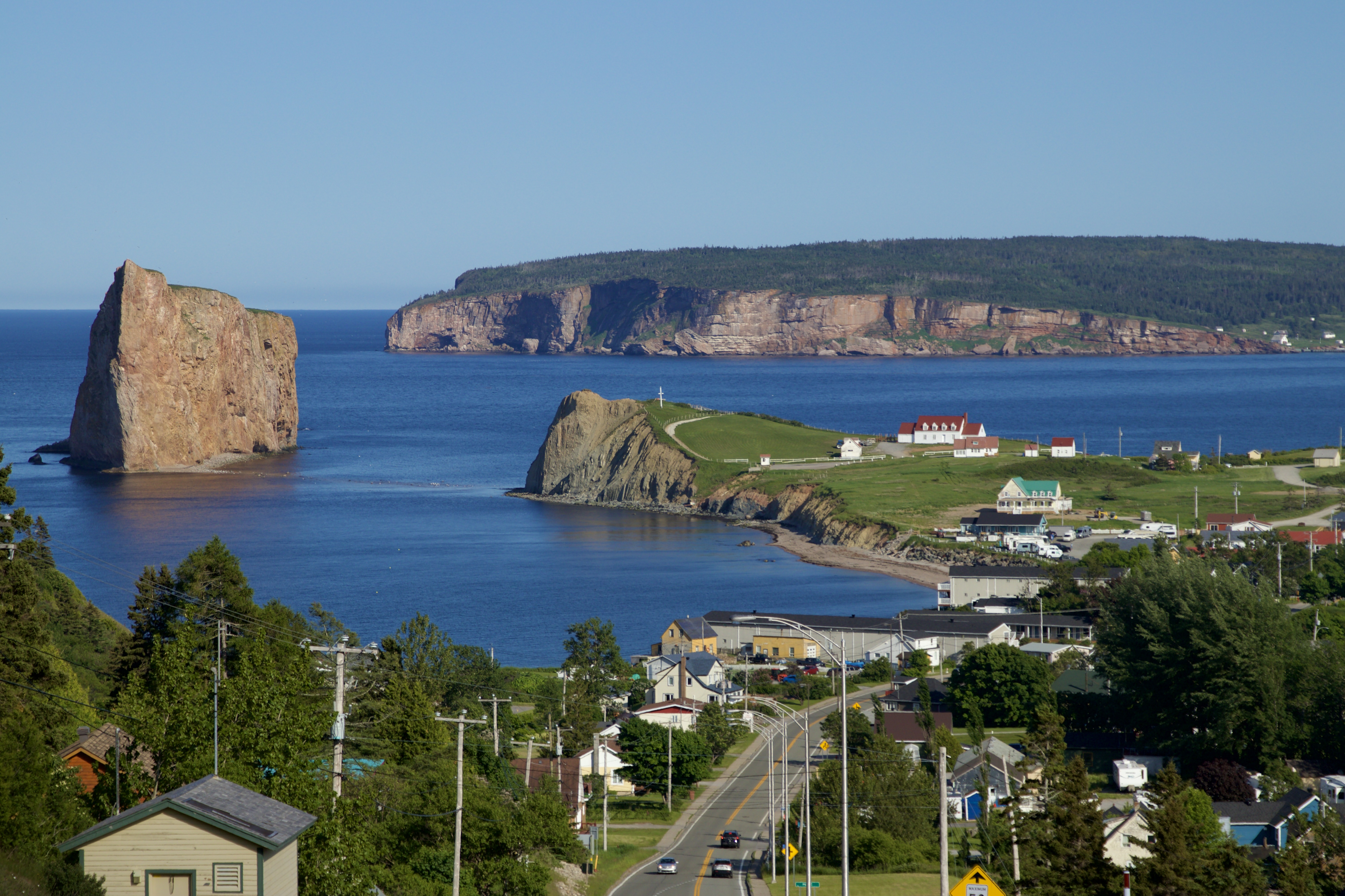
- View of Percé with Percé Rock offshore

- Coat of arms

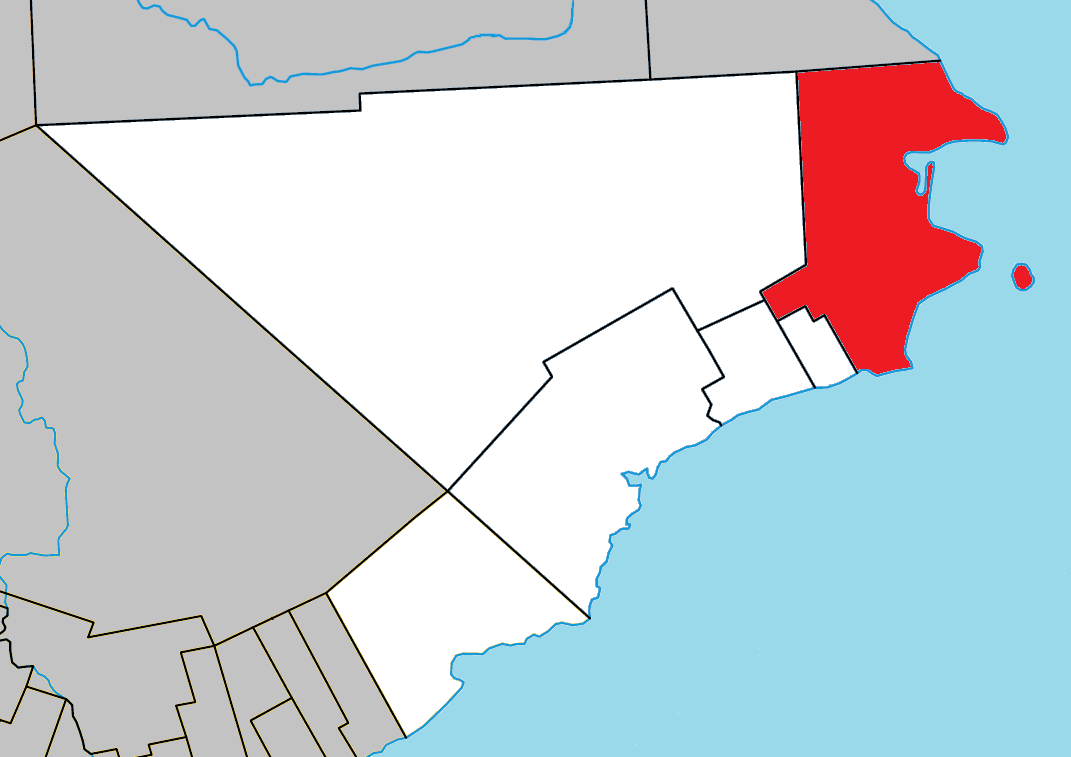
- Location within Le Rocher-Percé RCM

- Location in eastern Quebec
- Coordinates: 48°32′N 64°13′W
- Country: Canada
- Province: Quebec
- Region: Gaspésie–Îles-de-la-Madeleine
- RCM: Le Rocher-Percé
- Settled: 1800s
- Constituted: January 1, 1971

Government
  - Mayor: Daniel Leboeuf
  - Federal riding: Gaspésie—Les Îles-de-la-Madeleine—Listuguj
  - Prov. riding: Gaspé

Area
  - Total: 555.01 km^{2} (214.29 sq mi)
  - Land: 432.81 km^{2} (167.11 sq mi)

Population (2021)
  - Total: 3,095
  - Density: 7.2/km^{2} (19/sq mi)
  - Pop (2016-21): ▼0.3%
  - Dwellings: 1,862
- Time zone: UTC−5 (EST)
  - Summer (DST): UTC−4 (EDT)
- Postal code(s): G0C 2L0
- Area codes: 418 and 581
- Highways: R-132
- Website: ville.perce.qc.ca/en/

Percé (French pronunciation: [pɛʁse]) is a city located on the shores of the Gulf of St. Lawrence, near the tip of the Gaspé Peninsula, in Gaspésie-Îles-de-la-Madeleine, Quebec, Canada.

Percé, member of the association of Most Beautiful Villages of Quebec, is mainly a tourist location particularly well known for the attractions of Percé Rock and Bonaventure Island. UNESCO Global Geoparks accredited Percé Geopark in 2018.

In addition to Percé itself, the town's territory also includes the communities of Barachois, Belle-Anse, Bougainville, Bridgeville, Cap-d'Espoir, Cannes-de-Roches, Coin-du-Banc, L'Anse-à-Beaufils, Pointe-Saint-Pierre, Rameau, Saint-Georges-de-Malbaie, and Val-d'Espoir.

Percé is the seat of the judicial district of Gaspé. Within the territory of the city, the Railway station is also called Percé.

== History ==
The area was within the traditional homelands of the Mi'kmaq people, who called the place Sigsôg ("steep rocks" or "crags") and Pelseg ("fishing place"). In 1603, Samuel de Champlain visited the area and named the famous rock Isle Percée ("Pierced Island"). During the 17th century, the place was used primarily as a stop-over for ships travelling to Quebec.

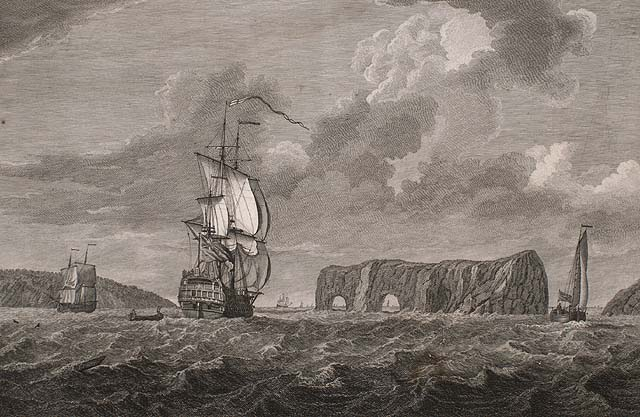
"A view of the Pierced Island, a remarkable rock in the Gulf of St. Laurence - two leagues to the southward of Gaspée Bay" by Hervey Smythe, 1760.

Used as a seasonal fishing centre during the New France era, permanent settlement began in the early 19th century with the arrival of Irish, French Canadian, and Jersey natives. In 1801 the Parish of Saint-Michel-de-Percé was founded. Percé became the most important fishing location on the Gaspé Peninsula after Charles Robin, a native of Jersey, began his fishing establishment. Old buildings of the Charles Robin Company can still be seen there.

In 1842, the geographic township of Percé was formed, and 3 years later, the place was incorporated as a township municipality. In 1847, it was abolished, but on July 1, 1855, it was reestablished. On February 24, 1868, the Township Municipality of Percé was dissolved and split into the Municipality of Anse-du-Cap and the Municipality of Percé.

In 1942, the Royal Canadian Navy made a decision to expand Direction Finding and wireless intercept at Cap D'Espoir to a 24-hour basis in order to provide more bearings on German U-boats and to intercept enemy radio traffic. The Department of Transport placed its facilities at the disposal of the RCN. On May 21/45, the Canadian Naval Service approved the closing down and disposal of Harbour Grace and Cap D'Espoir intercept stations.

In 1971, Percé was greatly expanded and gained ville (town) status when it amalgamated with these 5 surrounding municipalities (with year of original incorporation):

- Municipality of Barachois (1953)
- Municipality of Bridgeville (1933)
- Municipality of Cap-d'Espoir (1935)
- Municipality of Saint-Pierre-de-la-Malbaie N°1 (1876)
- Municipality of Saint-Pierre-de-la-Malbaie N°2 (1876)

== Demographics ==
In the 2021 Census of Population conducted by Statistics Canada, Percé had a population of 3,095 living in 1,550 of its 1,862 total private dwellings, a change of −0.3% from its 2016 population of 3,103. With a land area of 432.81 km^{2} (167.11 sq mi), it had a population density of 7.2/km^{2} (18.5/sq mi) in 2021.

Canada census – Percé community profile

	2021	2016	2011
Population	3,095 (-0.3% from 2016)	3,103 (-6.3% from 2011)	3,312 (-3.1% from 2006)
Land area	432.81 km^{2} (167.11 sq mi)	431.37 km^{2} (166.55 sq mi)	432.39 km^{2} (166.95 sq mi)
Population density	7.2/km^{2} (19/sq mi)	7.2/km^{2} (19/sq mi)	7.7/km^{2} (20/sq mi)
Median age	57.6 (M: 55.6, F: 60.0)	55.4 (M: 54.3, F: 56.3)	51.9 (M: 51.1, F: 52.7)
Private dwellings	1,862 (total) 1,550 (occupied)	1,880 (total)	1,907 (total)
Median household income	$56,400	$44,826	$36,524

References: 2021 2016 2011

Historical Census Data - Percé, Quebec

Year	Pop.	±%
1976	5,198	—
1981	4,839	−6.9%
1986	4,686	−3.2%
1991	4,028	−14.0%
1996	3,993	−0.9%

Year	Pop.	±%
2001	3,614	−9.5%
2006	3,419	−5.4%
2011	3,312	−3.1%
2016	3,103	−6.3%
2021	3,095	−0.3%

Source: Statistics Canada

Canada Census Mother Tongue - Percé, Quebec
Census	Total	French			English			French & English			Other		
Year	Responses	Count	Trend	Pop %	Count	Trend	Pop %	Count	Trend	Pop %	Count	Trend	Pop %
2021	3,075	2,360	▼2.3%	76.7%	645	▲5.7%	21.0%	35	▲16.7%	1.1%	40	▲166.7%	1.3%
2016	3,080	2,415	▼6.9%	78.4%	610	▼8.3%	19.8%	30	▼25.0%	1.0%	15	▲50.0%	0.5%
2011	3,310	2,595	▼3.7%	78.4%	665	▲3.1%	20.1%	40	▲166.7%	1.2%	10	▼84.6%	0.3%
2006	3,420	2,695	▼6.9%	78.8%	645	▼7.9%	18.9%	15	0.0%	0.4%	65	▲ n/a%	1.9%
2001	3,610	2,895	▼8.7%	80.2%	700	▼0.7%	19.4%	15	▼75.0%	0.4%	0	▼100.0%	0.0%
1996	3,950	3,170	n/a	80.3%	705	n/a	17.9%	60	n/a	1.5%	15	n/a	0.4%

== Economy ==
The main sector of economic activity is tourism due to the presence of Percé Rock as well as Bonaventure Island and its northern gannets. It was calculated that 60,000 visitors per year walked at the foot of the rock. However, it is now not recommended for visitors to approach within 500 meters of it due to the risk of landslides.

The two main attractions of the city of Percé are:

- The Île-Bonaventure-et-du-Rocher-Percé National Park
- The Percé UNESCO Global Geopark

Percé has a strong tourist positioning in Quebec and internationally and is a driving force in the tourism industry for the Gaspé Peninsula. It is an icon of the tourism industry in Quebec and Canada. The efforts made in recent years have helped stimulate and diversify its economy through tourism, the city's main economic activity niche.

With more than 500,000 visitors per year, the town of Percé plays an important role in the Quebec tourist economy, and has been rewarded for its undeniable quality of life.

== Arts and culture ==
Les Percéides, an annual film festival in Percé, screens a weeklong series of films at various venues in the town, climaxing in an outdoor gala screening on the public beach.

== Attractions ==
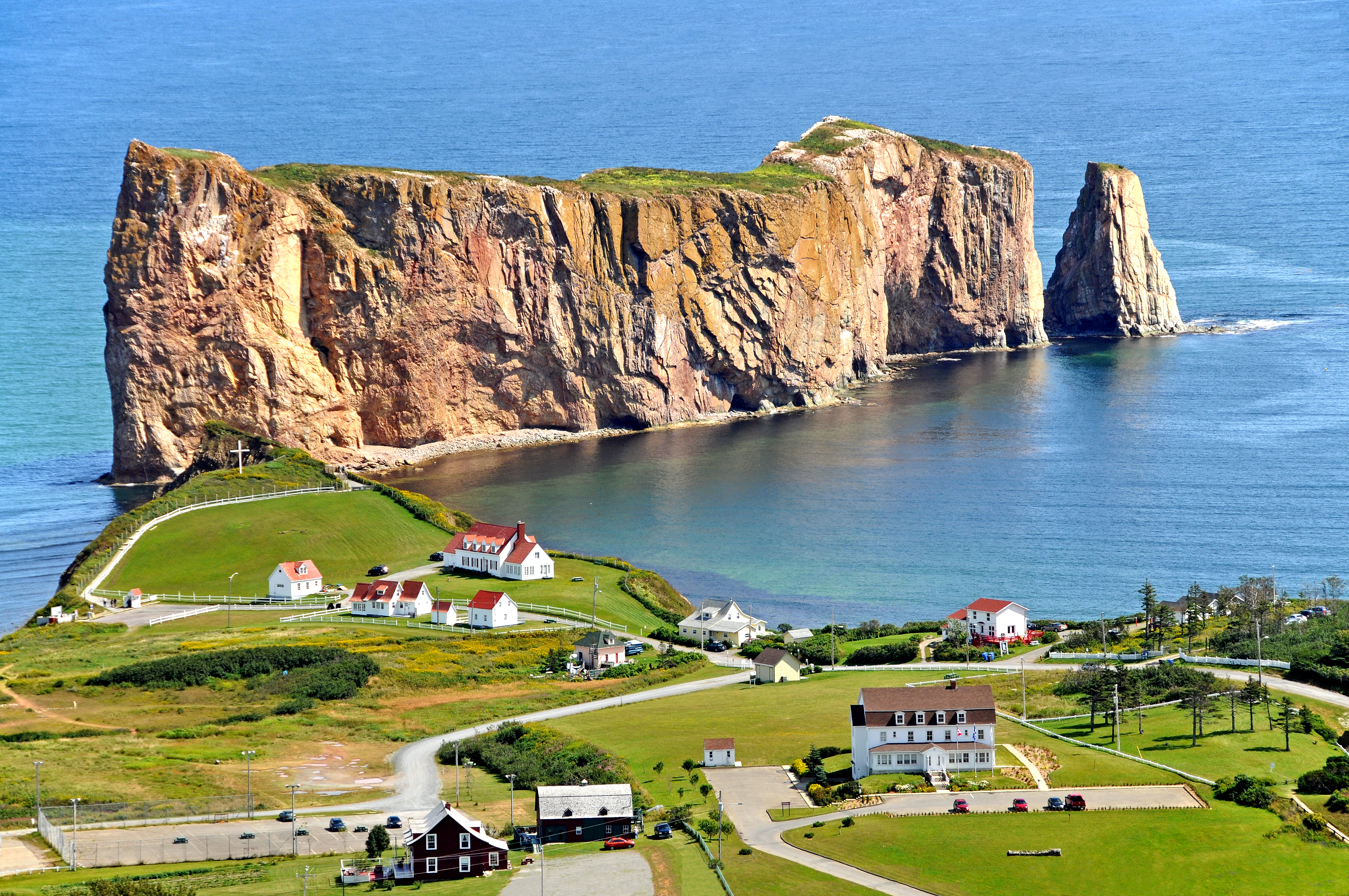
Percé Rock from nearby Mont-Sainte-Anne

Percé Rock is a natural rock formation located close to the shore facing the town. It is a natural tourist attraction for its size, colour, and unusual door-like hole at one end of the rock. It can be seen from any of the belvederes in the area including Mont Joli, Mont Sainte-Anne and Pic de l'Aurore. Tourists can walk up to the hole in the rock at low tide.

Bonaventure Island occupies an area of 4.16 square km facing the town of Percé. It is populated by one of the most important gannet colonies in the world and many other species of birds such as puffins, cormorants and murres also use the island as a home and breeding ground.

Whale watching is also a popular attraction in local area, and most notably, North Atlantic right whales, one of the rarest whales, had begun to concentrate off Percé in 1995 (this species was used to be regarded as sporadic visitors into the Gulf of St. Lawrence until 1994, and gradual increases have been confirmed in the entire St. Lawrence since 1998), and Gaspe Peninsula has become the centre of sightings in St. Lawrence region.

Further inland from Percé lies Mount Blanc which has a deep crevasse, as well as many other belvederes that overlook Cannes-de-Roches. Mount Sainte-Anne, with a height of 375 metres, provides views of the sea and, during times of good visibility, Miscou Island in New Brunswick can be seen.

== Government ==
List of former mayors:

- Georges Mamelonet (2003–2008)
- Denis Cain (2009–2009)
- Bruno Cloutier (2009–2013)
- André Boudreau (2013–2017)
- Cathy Poirier (2017–present)

== Infrastructure ==
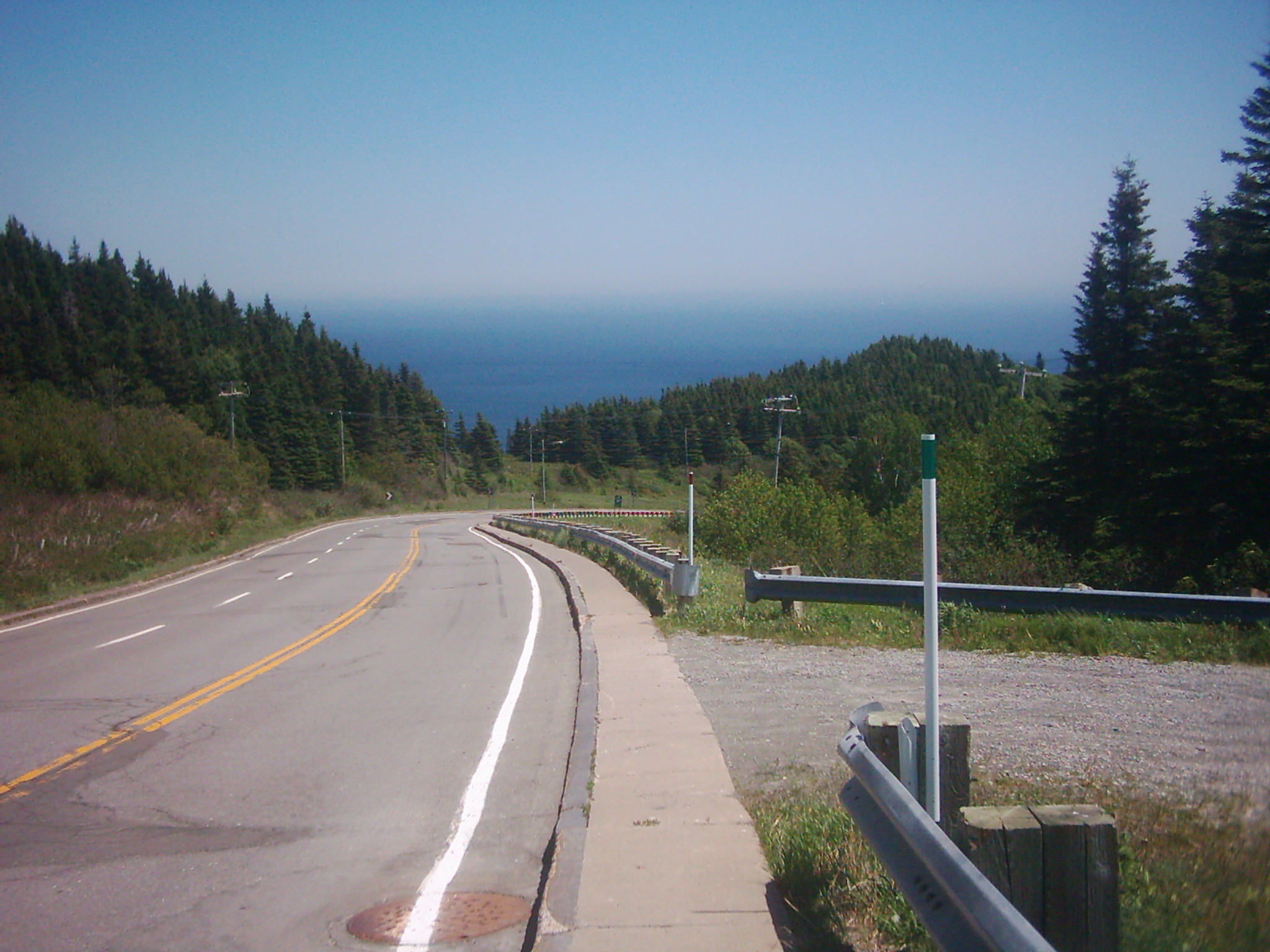
Quebec Route 132 in Percé

Percé can be accessed via Route 132, coming either from the north or the south. It is also reachable by air from the nearby Du Rocher-Percé Airport via private or charter aircraft - there is no scheduled air service to this airport. There was a rail link to Montreal, but that service was suspended in 2013, and there has been no indication of a resumption.

Behind the St. Michael's Church of Percé, walking trails lead up past lookouts to the summit of Mont Saint-Anne of 348 metres (1,142 ft), the Grotto of Mother Mary with a waterfall and Crevasse. Another high hill, Mont-Blanc, has views of the region.

In the coastal waters, visitors can observe various species of marine mammals, such as seals and whales. The region is home to thousands of marine birds, which crowd the rocks of the Parc national de l'Ile-Bonaventure-et-du-Rocher-Percé facing of the town, just 3.2 kilometres off the coast of Percé.

== See also ==
- List of anglophone communities in Quebec
- List of cities in Quebec
