= Syltefjorden =

Syltefjorden or Syltefjord may refer to:

== Places ==
- Syltefjorden (Møre og Romsdal), a fjord in Vanylven municipality in Møre og Romsdal county, Norway
- Syltefjorden (Finnmark), a fjord in Båtsfjord municipality in Finnmark county, Norway
- Nordfjord, Finnmark (also known as Syltefjord), an abandoned fishing village in Båtsfjord municipality in Finnmark county, Norway
- Syltefjord Chapel, a chapel in Båtsfjord municipality in Finnmark county, Norway
