= Tetrabothrius bassani =

Scientific classification
- Kingdom: Animalia
- Phylum: Platyhelminthes
- Class: Cestoda
- Order: Tetrabothriidea
- Family: Tetrabothriidae
- Genus: Tetrabothrius
- Species: T. bassani

Binomial name
- Tetrabothrius bassani Burt, 1978

Species of tapeworm

Tetrabothrius bassani is a tapeworm in the subclass Eucestoda found in the northern gannet, Morus bassani. It absorbs toxic heavy metals at a higher concentration than the gannet's own tissues, with an average 12 times as much cadmium as the gannet's pectoral muscles and 7-10 times the lead level of the bird's kidney and liver. Since levels of these toxic levels are detectable in the parasite earlier than in the host, the tapeworm might be used as an early indicator of marine pollution.
