= Stauran =

Mountain cliff in Båtsfjord, Norway

- Syltefjordstauran
- Location of the mountain

Highest point
- Elevation: 222 m (728 ft)
- Coordinates: 70.596082°N 30.311107°E

Geography
- Location: Finnmark, Norway

Stauren or Syltefjordstauran is a mountain cliff in Båtsfjord Municipality in Finnmark County, Norway. It is located along the northern coast of the Syltefjorden, about 10 kilometres (6.2 mi) northeast of the abandoned village of Nordfjord. The 222-metre (728 ft) tall mountain cliff runs for a length of about 3 kilometres (1.9 mi) along the shore. It is among the largest bird cliffs in Finnmark county.

The cliff hosts the largest colony of black-legged kittiwake in Northern Europe as well as a large colony of northern gannet.
