= Syltefjord Chapel =

- Syltefjord kapell
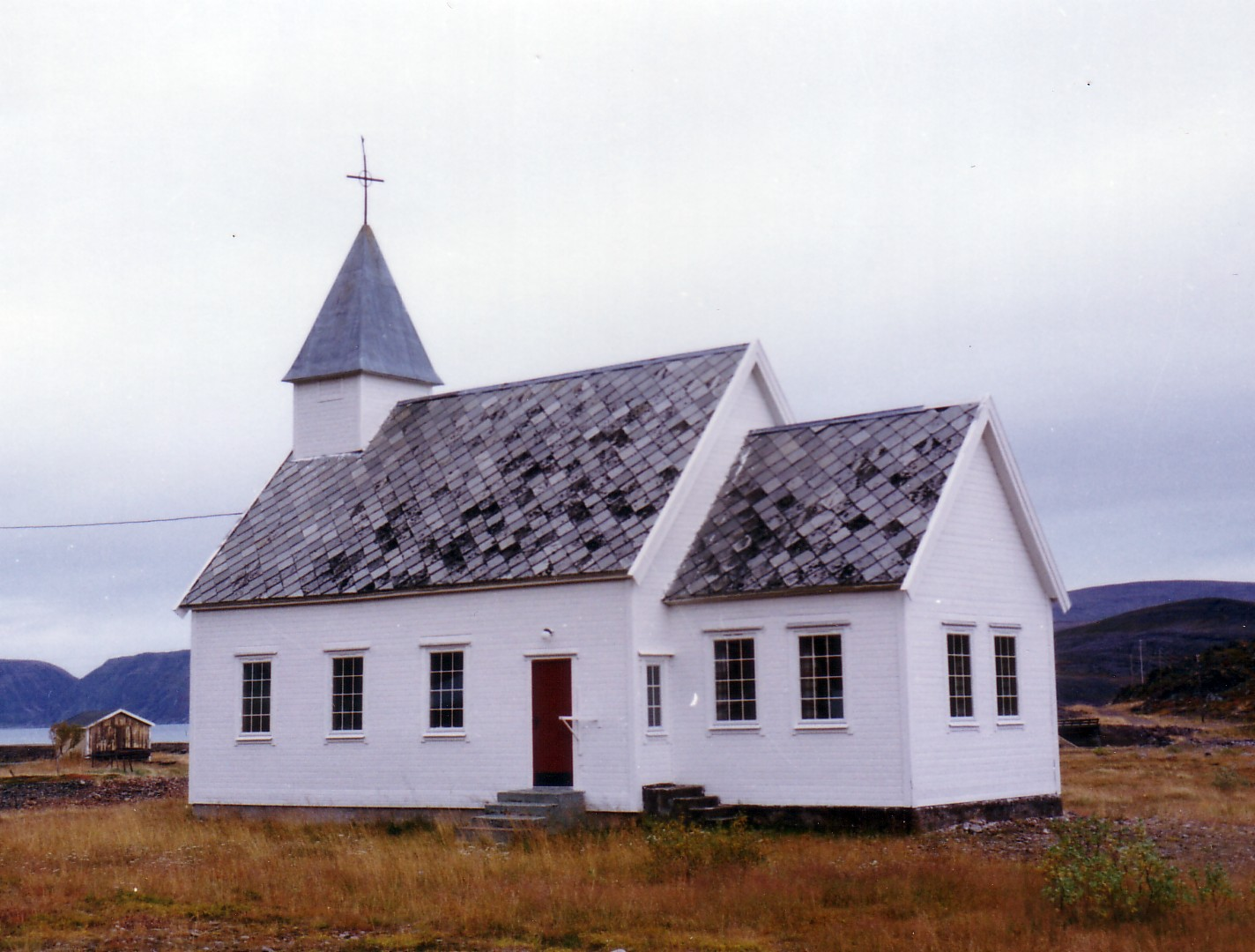
- View of the chapel
- Syltefjord Chapel
- 70.5494646°N 30.0764881°E
- Location: Båtsfjord, Finnmark
- Country: Norway
- Denomination: Church of Norway
- Churchmanship: Evangelical Lutheran

History
- Status: Chapel
- Consecrated: 1934
- Events: Moved to Nordfjord in 1955

Architecture
- Functional status: Inactive
- Architectural type: Long church
- Completed: 1934 (92 years ago)

Specifications
- Capacity: 60
- Materials: Wood

Administration
- Diocese: Nord-Hålogaland
- Deanery: Varanger prosti
- Parish: Båtsfjord
- Norwegian Cultural Heritage Site
- Type: Church
- Status: Listed
- ID: 85027

Syltefjord Chapel (Norwegian: Syltefjord kapell) is a chapel of the Church of Norway in Båtsfjord Municipality in Finnmark county, Norway. It is located in the now-abandoned (uninhabited) village of Nordfjord. It was an annex chapel for the Båtsfjord parish which is part of the Varanger prosti (deanery) in the Diocese of Nord-Hålogaland. The small, white, wooden chapel was built in a long church style in 1934. The church seats about 60 people.

The small wooden chapel was originally built in 1934 in the village of Makkaur. The village was abandoned after World War II and the chapel was then moved to the village of Nordfjord, along the Syltefjorden. It is no longer regularly used, since the village is no longer inhabited. The area still is used for vacationers in the summer, and the chapel is occasionally used for special events.

== See also ==
- List of churches in Nord-Hålogaland
