= Baccalieu Island Ecological Reserve =

Wildlife reserve in Canada

Coordinates: 48°07′35″N 52°48′12″W

Baccalieu Island Ecological Reserve is a wildlife reserve located on an island off the northeastern tip of Bay de Verde Peninsula (part of the Avalon Peninsula) of Newfoundland.

Baccalieu Island is the largest seabird island in Newfoundland and supports the greatest diversity of breeding seabirds in Eastern North America. The island supports the largest known colony of Leach's storm petrel in the world, approximately 40% of the global population and about 70% of the western Atlantic population of this species. It is a nesting area for 11 breeding species:

- Atlantic puffin (45,000 pairs – approximately 12% of the eastern North America population) at Puffin Island;
- Black-legged kittiwake (13,000 – approximately 5–7% of the western Atlantic breeding population); and
- Northern gannet (677 pairs – approximately 1.5% of the North American population).
- Northern fulmar
- Black guillemot
- Common murre
- Thick-billed murre
- Razorbill
- Herring gull
- Great black-backed gull

The island also includes one of the largest winter populations of eider in Newfoundland.
