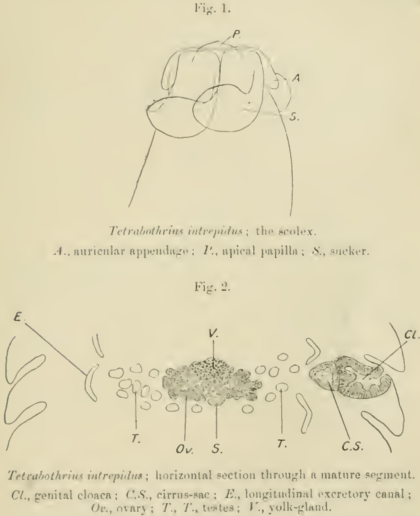
- Tetrabothrius intrepidus

Scientific classification
- Kingdom: Animalia
- Phylum: Platyhelminthes
- Class: Cestoda
- Order: Tetrabothriidea
- Family: Tetrabothriidae
- Genus: Tetrabothrius; Rudolphi, 1819

Species
- See text

Synonyms
- Amphoterocotyle Diesing, 1856; Biamniculus Murav'eva, 1975; Bothridiotaenia Lönnberg, 1896; Bothriodiotaenia Monticelli, 1900; Culmenamniculus Murav'eva, 1975; Diplobothrium Lönnberg, 1891; Eutetrabothrium Diesing, 1854; Neotetrabothrius Nybelin, 1929; Paratetrabothrius Yamaguti, 1940; Prostecocotyle Braun in Bronn, 1894; Prosthecotyle Monticelli, 1892; Tethrabothrium Eschricht, 1855; Tetrabothris Berthold, 1827; Tetrabotris Blainville in Bremser, 1824; Tetrobothrium Örley, 1885; Uniamniculus Murav'eva, 1975

= Tetrabothrius =

Genus of flatworms

Tetrabothrius is a genus of flatworms that belongs to the family Tetrabothriidae. The genus can be found worldwide making it an cosmopolitan taxon. It is a parasitic species of flatworms that can be commonly seen in the intestines of large baleen whales and seabirds such as penguins.

== Ecology ==
=== Parasitism ===
Tetrabothrius is a parasitic genus that can infect the small intestines of various cetacean species, in particular large baleen whales. This includes the blue whale (Balaenoptera musculus), sei whale (Balaenoptera borealis), fin whale (Balaenoptera physalus) and the sperm whale (Physeter macrocephalus). They have also been found to be parasites of some dolphin species such as the common dolphin (Delphinus delphis) and the spinner dolphin (Stenella longirostris). Records of this genus have been found in the intestines of the yangtze finless porpoise (Neophocaena asiaeorientalis).

The intestines of many seabird species are also susceptible to be parasitized by this genus. Tetrabothrius, along with Parorchites, is often one of the most frequently recorded flatworms in various penguins and the antarctic petrel (Thalassoica antarctica). This genus has been recorded to parasitize the emperor penguin (Aptenodytes forsteri), king penguin (Aptenodytes patagonicus), gentoo penguin (Pygoscelis papua), adélie penguin (Pygoscelis adeliae), chinstrap penguin (Pygoscelis antarcticus), little penguin (Eudyptula novaehollandiae), and the macaroni penguin (Eudyptes chrysolophus).

== Taxonomy ==
The genus was described in 1819 by Karl Rudolphi, a Swedish-German naturalist who is credited for being the father of helminthology. The genus contains many taxonomic synonyms.

=== Species ===
The genus currently contains more than 60 described species. Below is a list of species that belong to this genus:

- Tetrabothrius affinis (Lönnberg, 1891) Lönnberg, 1892
- Tetrabothrius argentinum Szidat, 1964
- Tetrabothrius arsenyevi Delyamure, 1955
- Tetrabothrius baeri Burt, 1976
- Tetrabothrius bairdi Burt, 1978
- Tetrabothrius bassani Burt, 1978
- Tetrabothrius campanulatus (Fuhrmann, 1899) Fuhrmann, 1908
- Tetrabothrius creani Leiper & Atkinson, 1914
- Tetrabothrius curilensis Gubanov, 1955
- Tetrabothrius cylindraceus Rudolphi, 1819
- Tetrabothrius diomedea Fuhrmann, 1900
- Tetrabothrius diplosoma Guiart, 1935
- Tetrabothrius drygalskii Szpotanska, 1929
- Tetrabothrius egregius Skrjabin & Murav'eva, 1971
- Tetrabothrius erostris (Lönnberg, 1899) Baylis, 1926
- Tetrabothrius eudyptidis (Lönnberg, 1896) Nybelin, 1929
- Tetrabothrius fallax (Van Beneden, 1871) Örley, 1885
- Tetrabothrius filiformis Nybelin, 1916
- Tetrabothrius forsteri (Krefft, 1871) Fuhrmann, 1904
- Tetrabothrius fuhrmanni Nybelin, 1916
- Tetrabothrius gracilis Nybelin, 1916
- Tetrabothrius heteroclitus Diesing, 1850
- Tetrabothrius heterosoma (Baird, 1853) Fuhrmann, 1913
- Tetrabothrius hobergi Nikolov, Cappozo, Berón-Vera, Crespo, Raga & Fernández, 2010
- Tetrabothrius hoyeri Szpotanska, 1929
- Tetrabothrius immerinus (Abildgaard, 1790)
- Tetrabothrius innominatus Baer, 1954
- Tetrabothrius jaegerskioeldi Nybelin, 1916
- Tetrabothrius jaegerskioldi Nybelin, 1916
- Tetrabothrius jagerskioldi Nybelin, 1916
- Tetrabothrius joubini Railliet & Henry, 1912
- Tetrabothrius kowalewskii Szpotanska, 1917
- Tetrabothrius laccocephalus Spätlich, 1909
- Tetrabothrius lutzi Parona, 1901
- Tetrabothrius macrocephalus (Rudolphi, 1808) Rudolphi, 1819
- Tetrabothrius mawsoni Johnston, 1937
- Tetrabothrius minor (Lönnberg, 1893) Fuhrmann, 1899
- Tetrabothrius minutus Szpotanska, 1917
- Tetrabothrius morschtini Murav'eva, 1968
- Tetrabothrius mozambiquus Deblock, 1966
- Tetrabothrius nelsoni Leiper & Atkinson, 1914
- Tetrabothrius norvegicum Olsson, 1868
- Tetrabothrius pauliani Joyeux & Baer, 1954
- Tetrabothrius pelecaniaquilae (Rudolphi, 1819) Fuhrmann, 1908
- Tetrabothrius pellucidus Nybelin, 1929
- Tetrabothrius peregrinatoris Burt, 1976
- Tetrabothrius perfidus Joyeux & Baer, 1934
- Tetrabothrius phalacrocoracis Burt, 1977
- Tetrabothrius polyorchis Nybelin, 1916
- Tetrabothrius porrigens Molin, 1858
- Tetrabothrius priestleyi Leiper & Atkinson, 1914
- Tetrabothrius procerus Spätlich, 1909
- Tetrabothrius reditus Burt, 1978
- Tetrabothrius ruudi Nybelin, 1928
- Tetrabothrius sarasini Fuhrmann, 1918
- Tetrabothrius schaeferi Markowski, 1955
- Tetrabothrius shinni Hoberg, 1987
- Tetrabothrius skoogi Nybelin, 1916
- Tetrabothrius sphaerocephalum (Deslongchamps, 1824) Diesing, 1850
- Tetrabothrius sulae Szpotanska, 1929
- Tetrabothrius torulosus Linstow, 1888
- Tetrabothrius umbrella (Fuhrmann, 1899)
- Tetrabothrius wilsoni Leiper & Atkinson, 1914
- Tetrabothrius wrighti Leiper & Atkinson, 1914
