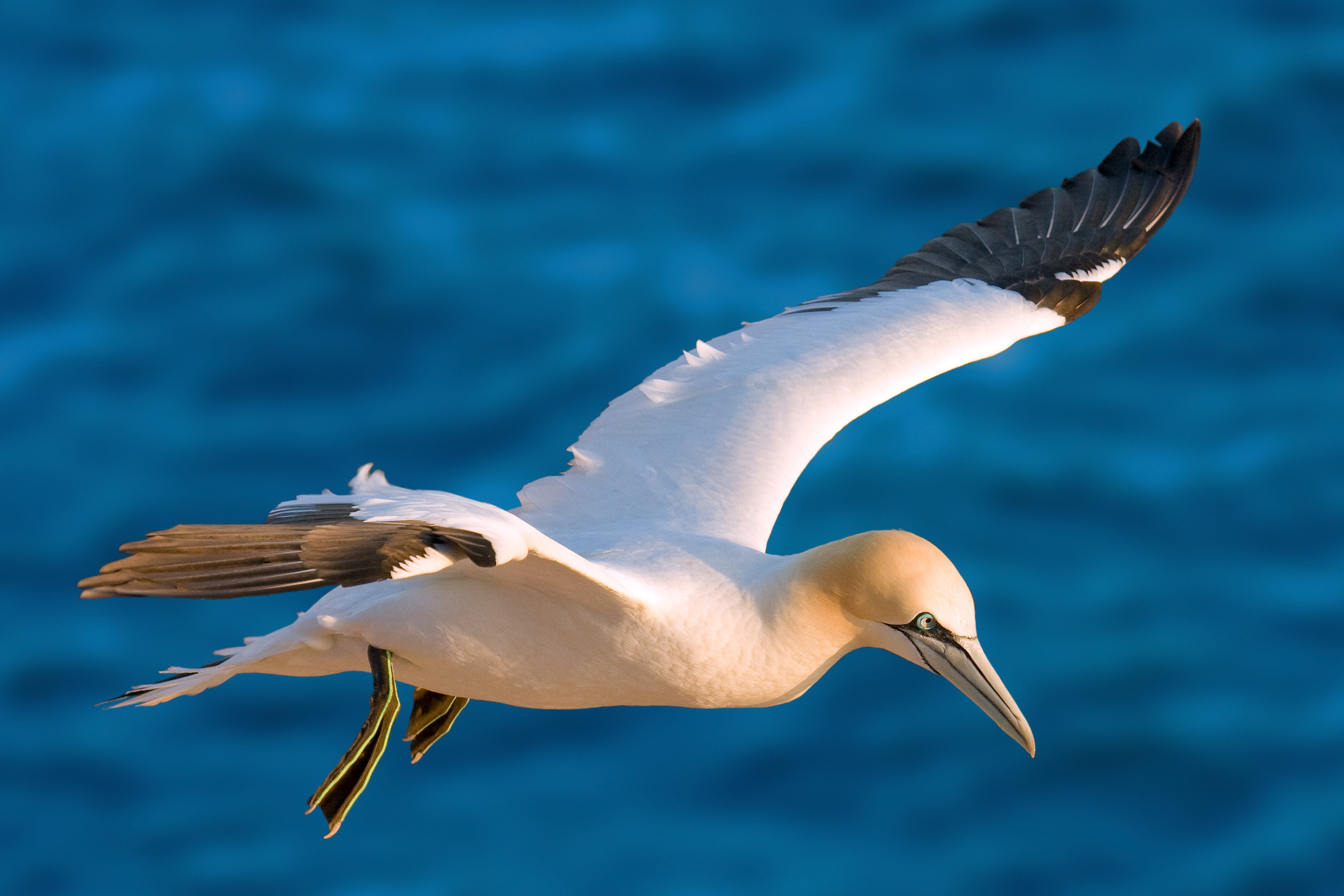

Conservation status
- Least Concern (IUCN 3.1)

Scientific classification
- Kingdom: Animalia
- Phylum: Chordata
- Class: Aves
- Order: Suliformes
- Family: Sulidae
- Genus: Morus
- Species: M. bassanus

Binomial name
- Morus bassanus (Linnaeus, 1758)
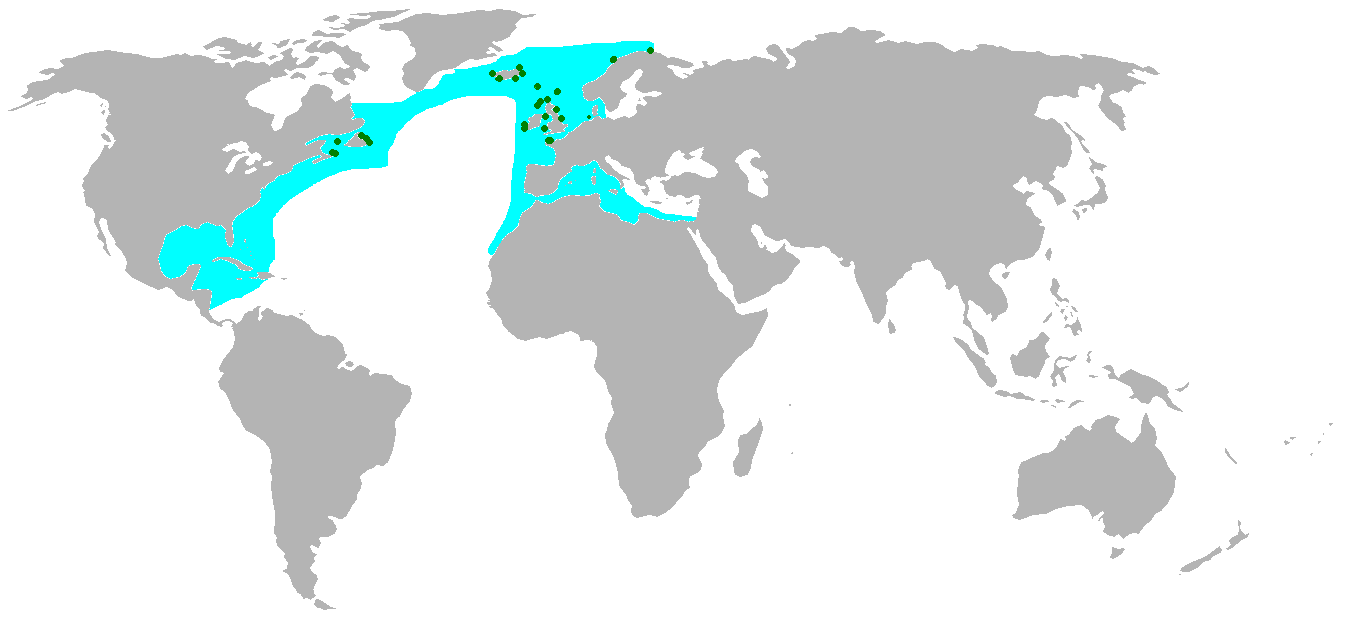
- Northern gannet range

Synonyms
- Sula bassana (Linnaeus, 1758) Pelecanus bassanus Linnaeus, 1758 Sula americana Bonaparte, 1838

= Northern gannet =

Species of bird

The northern gannet (Morus bassanus) is a seabird, the largest species of the gannet family, Sulidae. It is native to the coasts of the North Atlantic Ocean, breeding in Western Europe and Northeastern North America. It is the largest seabird in the northern Atlantic. The sexes are similar in appearance. The adult northern gannet has a mainly white streamlined body with a long neck, and long and slender wings. It is 87–100 cm (34 1/2–39 1/2 in) long with a 170–180 cm (67–71 in) wingspan. The head and nape have a buff tinge that is more prominent in breeding season, and the wings are edged with dark brown-black feathers. The long, pointed bill is blue-grey, contrasting with black, bare skin around the mouth and eyes. Juveniles are mostly grey-brown, becoming increasingly white in the five years it takes them to reach maturity.

Nesting takes place in colonies on both sides of the North Atlantic, the largest of which are at the Bass Rock (75,000 pairs as of 2014), St. Kilda (60,000 pairs as of 2013) and Ailsa Craig (33,000 pairs as of 2014) in Scotland, in Ireland (Sceilg Bheag; little Skellig, 35,000 pairs in 2011), Grassholm in Wales, and Bonaventure Island (60,000 pairs in 2009) off the coast of Quebec. Its breeding range has extended northward and eastward, with colonies being established on Russia's Kola Peninsula in 1995 and Bear Island (the southernmost island of Svalbard), in 2011. Colonies are mostly located on offshore islands with cliffs, from which the birds can more easily launch into the air. The northern gannet undertakes seasonal migrations and catches fish (which are the mainstay of its diet) by making high-speed dives into the sea up to 60 mph.

The northern gannet was previously hunted for food in certain parts of its range, and although that practice still continues in the Outer Hebrides of Scotland and the Faroe Islands, the bird faces few other natural or man-made threats. Since its population is growing, the International Union for Conservation of Nature considers it a least-concern species. Because it is both a conspicuous and a common bird, it is referred to in several ancient myths and legends.

== Taxonomy ==
The Swiss naturalist Conrad Gessner gave the northern gannet the name Anser bassanus or scoticus in the 16th century, and noted that the Scots called it a solendguse. The former name was also used by the English naturalist Francis Willughby in the 17th century; the species was known to him from a colony in the Firth of Forth and from a stray bird that was found near Coleshill, Warwickshire. (Note: The universally accepted starting point for the modern taxonomy of animals is 1758, when Linnaeus' 10th edition of Systema Naturae was published, although scientists had begun coining animal names in the previous century.) It was one of the many species originally described by the Swedish zoologist Carl Linnaeus in the landmark 1758 10th edition of his Systema Naturae, where it was given the binomial name Pelecanus bassanus. The French biologist Brisson placed it in the genus Sula in 1760, and his compatriot Louis Pierre Vieillot moved the species to his new genus Morus in 1816. Morus is derived from Ancient Greek moros, meaning 'foolish', and refers to the lack of fear shown by breeding gannets and boobies, which enables them to be easily killed. The specific name bassanus is from the Bass Rock in the Firth of Forth. The ornithologist Bryan Nelson in 1978 supported the species' inclusion in Sula as he felt the differences in anatomy, behaviour, ecology and morphology between gannets and boobies were not sufficient to warrant separate genera.

Charles Lucien Bonaparte described the American populations as Sula americana in 1838, though the basis for distinguishing them from the European species was unclear and the name is now considered to be a synonym.

"Northern gannet" has been designated as the official English common name for the species by the International Ornithologists' Union (IOC). It is also known as the North Atlantic gannet. Gannet is derived from Old English ganot, meaning "strong or masculine", which is ultimately from the same Old Germanic root as gander. Soland goose and similar old names for the northern gannet such as solan or solan goose derive from a hypothetical Scottish Gaelic sulan, itself borrowed from the Old Norse sula. The literal meaning is "cleft stick", referring to the appearance of the conspicuous crossed black wing tips on a perched northern gannet. Old regional names such as Norfolk's "herring gant" or Yorkshire's "mackerel gant" refer to typical fish prey. Lincolnshire's gaunt, although derived from the same Germanic root, usually applies to the great crested grebe, but the English writer Richard Hakluyt used the term in 1600 to refer to the gannet, "a great White foule". Young birds have been called "spotted booby" or "parliament goose", the former term referring to their plumage. The feeding habits of the gannet have led to its name being used as slang for a gluttonous person, a usage first recorded in 1929.

The Sulidae, the gannets and boobies, appeared about 30 million years ago. Early Sulidae fossils resembled the boobies, although they were more aquatic, the gannets splitting off later, about 16 million years ago. The gannets evolved in the Northern Hemisphere, later colonising the southern oceans. The most ancient extant species may be the Abbott's booby, possibly the sole survivor of an otherwise extinct separate lineage. A 2011 genetic study of nuclear and mitochondrial DNA suggests that the ancestor of the gannets arose around 2.5 million years ago before splitting into northern and southern lineages. The latter then split into the Cape and Australasian gannets around 0.5 million years ago. The three gannets are generally considered to be separate species forming a superspecies, though they have also formerly been classified as subspecies of Sula bassanus.

== Description ==
A northern gannet in flight

An adult northern gannet has a 170–180 cm (67–71 in) wingspan, and is 87–100 cm (34 1/2–39 1/2 in) long and weighs 2.3–3.6 kg (5–8 lb), making it the largest gannet and the largest seabird native to the western Palearctic. The two sexes are generally of a similar size and appearance. The plumage is white with dark brown to black wing tips; the primary flight feathers, primary coverts and alulae are dark. The head and neck are tinged buff-yellow, becoming much more prominent in the breeding season. Males are more deeply coloured than females. The eyes are surrounded by black bare skin and have a cobalt blue orbital ring; the iris is light blue-grey with a fine dark outer ring. Some northern gannets that recovered from highly pathogenic avian influenza H5N1 infection had black irises rather than the usual pale blue; this may provide a visible indicator of previous infection.

The beak is long, strong and conical with a slight downcurve at the end and a sharp cutting edge. In adults, the beak is blue-grey with dark grey or black edges. There is a black groove running the length of the mandible that merges into the skin around the eyes. A black band of bare skin also separates the pale feathers of the forehead and throat from the bill, which gives the gannet its distinctive face markings. The four-toed feet are joined by a membrane that can vary in colour from dark grey to dark brown. There are coloured lines running along the toes that continue along up the legs. These are typically greenish-yellow in males and bluish in females and probably have a role in mating. Fledglings are dark grey to slate-grey with upperparts and wings finely speckled with white. There is a prominent V-shaped white area under the rump. The wing tips and tail are dark brown-black, partly tipped with white. The bill and iris are dark brown. They can weigh more than 4 kg (9 lb) by the time they leave the nest at about 10 weeks of age. In the second year, the bird's appearance changes depending on the different phases of moulting: they can have adult plumage at the front and continue to be brown at the rear. Gannets gradually acquire more white in subsequent seasons until they reach maturity after five years.

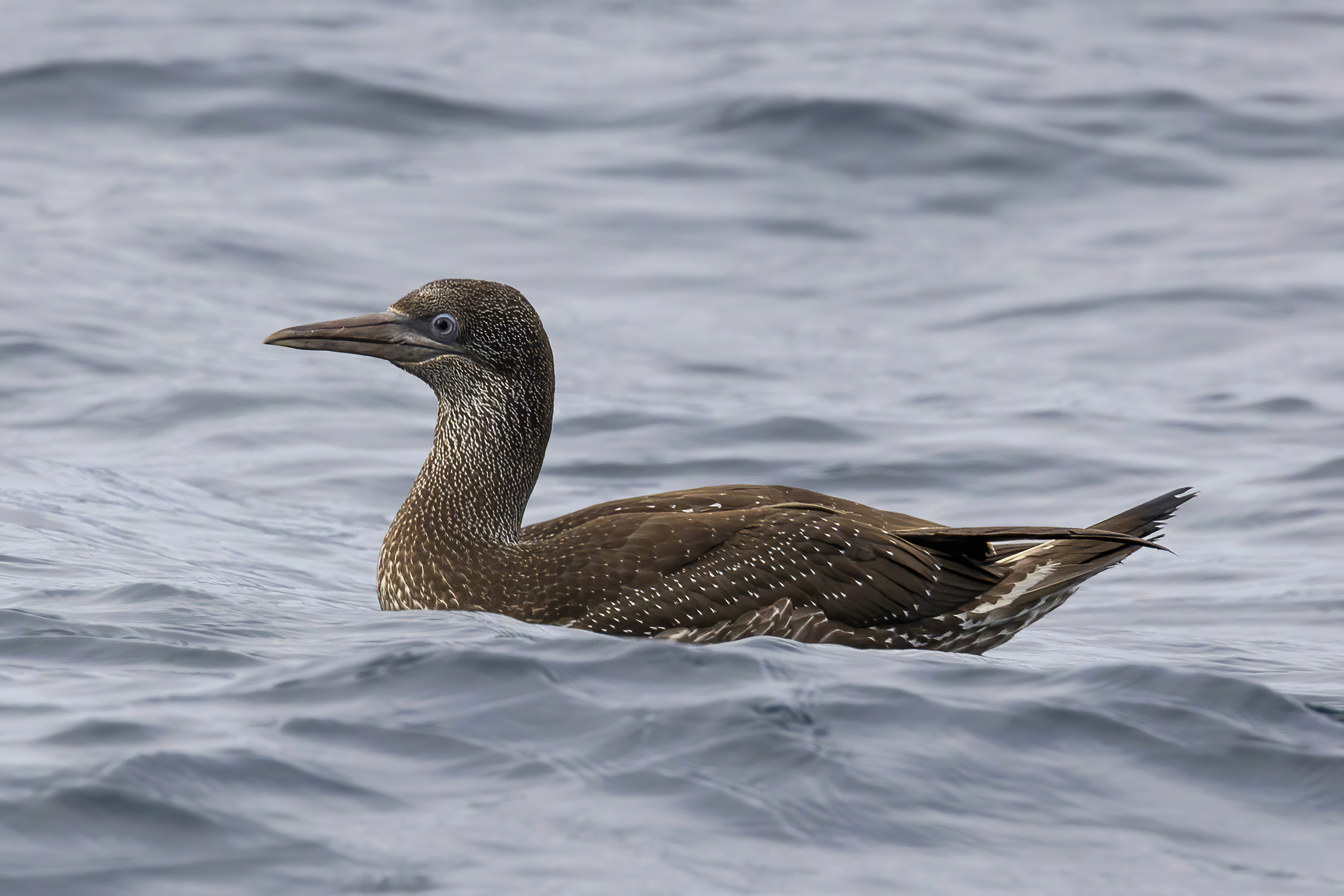
Juvenile

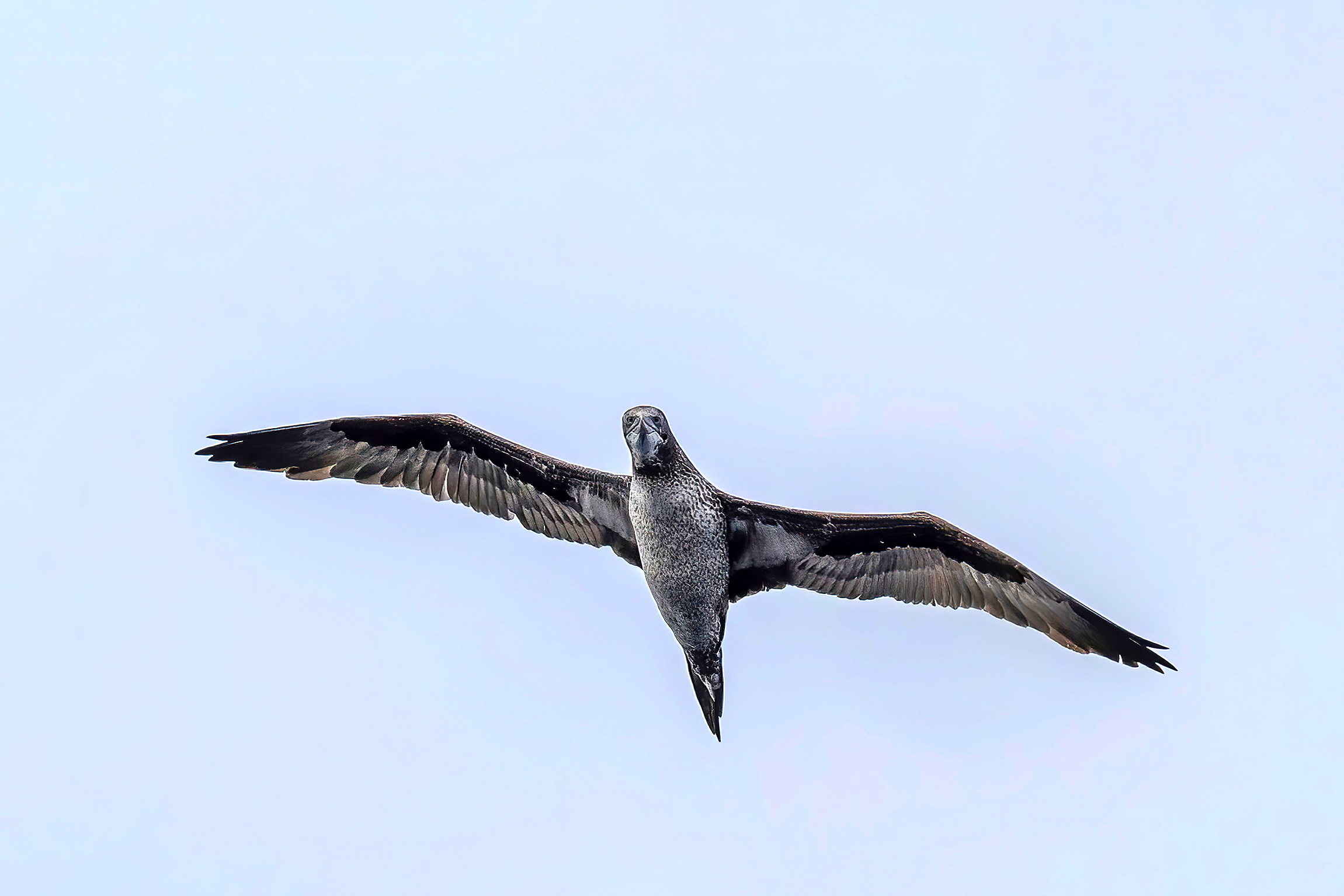
Juvenile

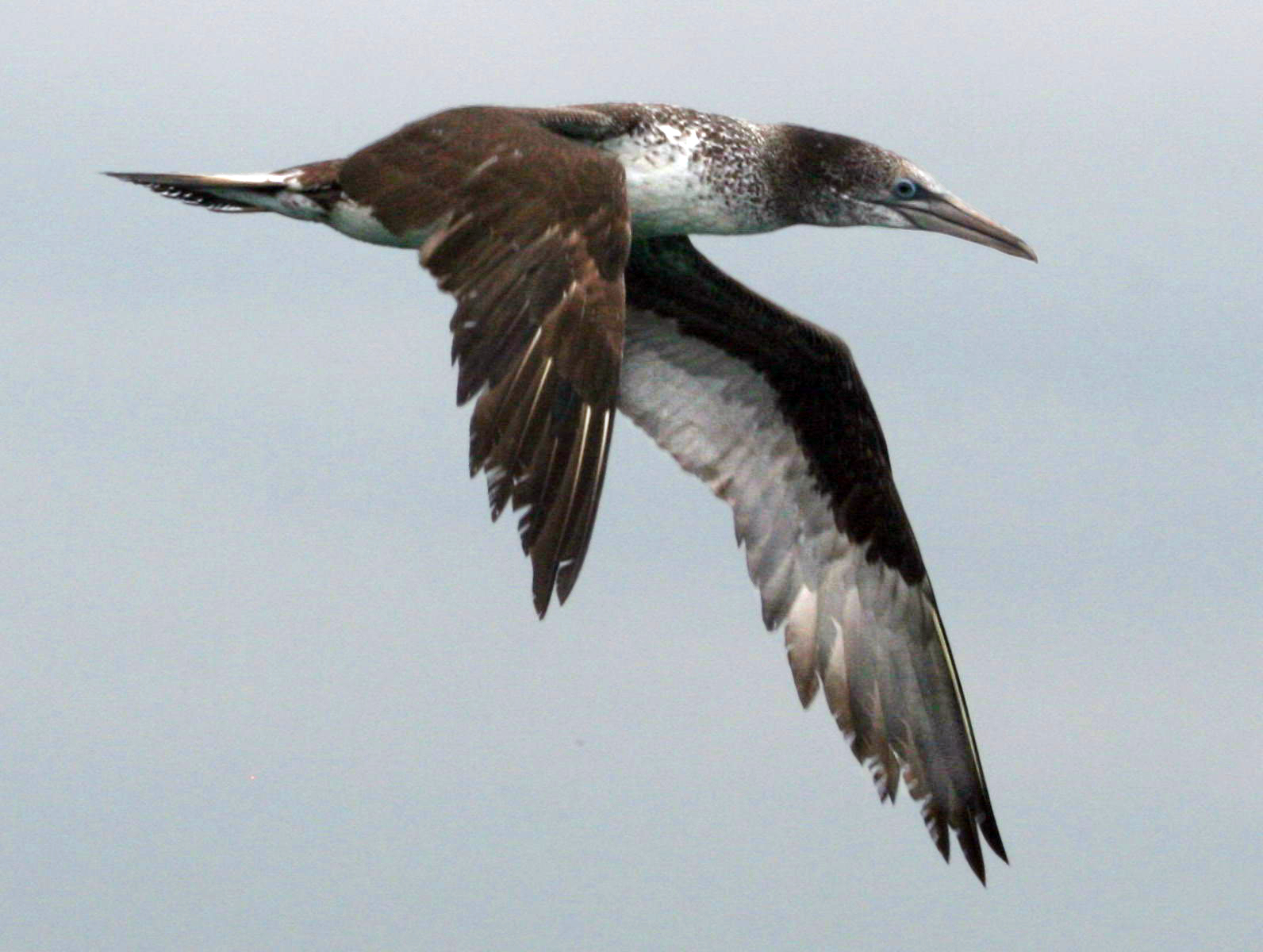
Immature

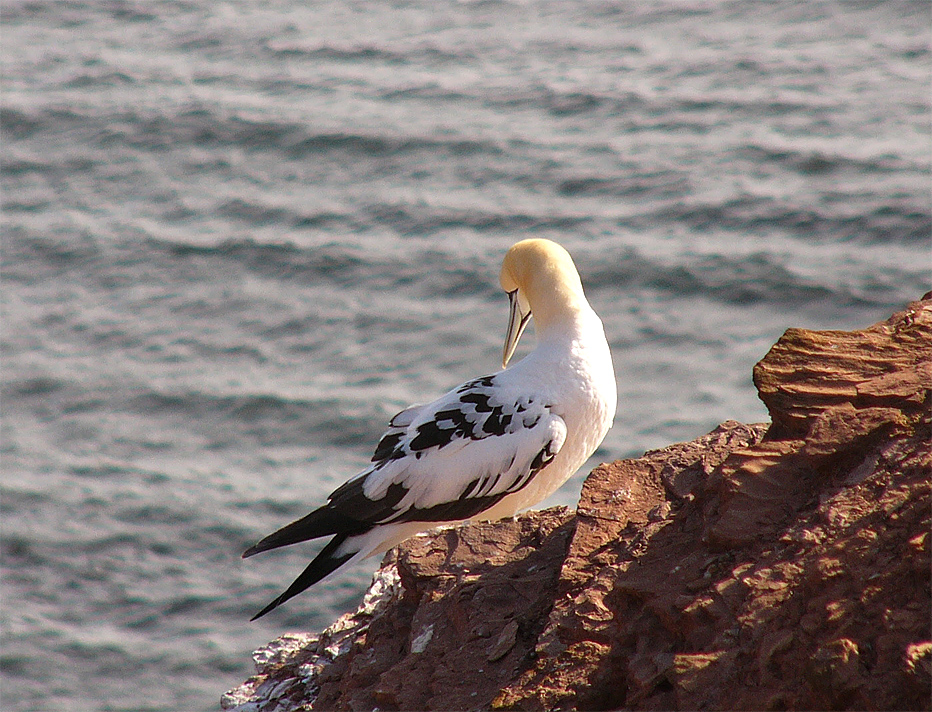
Sub adult

Adult

Northern gannets are slightly larger and thicker-billed than Cape or Australian gannets. The northern gannet has more white in the wings and an all-white tail, the other species having black tips to their tail feathers. Individuals on the west coast of Africa could be confused with vagrant masked boobies, though the latter is smaller overall, lacks the buff tinge to the head, and has a black tail. From a distance, or in poor visibility, albatrosses can be confused with northern gannets, particularly those with immature plumage that have more black on the wings.

=== Adaptations for diving ===
Northern gannets have streamlined bodies adapted for plunge-diving at high speed, including powerful neck muscles, and a spongy bone plate at the base of the bill. The nostrils are inside the bill and can be closed to prevent water entry; the eyes are protected by strong nictitating membranes. There are subcutaneous air sacs in the lower body and along the sides. Other air sacs are located between the sternum and the pectoral muscles and between the ribs and the intercostal muscles. These sacs are connected to the lungs and are filled with air when the bird breathes in. The air can be returned to the lungs by muscle contractions.

The feathers are waterproof, which allows the birds to spend long periods in water. A water-impermeable secretion produced by a sebaceous gland covers the feathers, and the birds spread it across their body using their beak or head. Individuals have a subcutaneous fat layer, dense down feathers and tightly overlapping feathers that help them withstand low temperatures. A reduced blood flow in the webbing on their feet outside of the breeding season also helps to maintain body temperature when the birds swim.

=== Call ===
Calls from Grassholm, Wales

The northern gannet is a loud and vocal bird, particularly in the colony. Its typical call is a harsh arrah-arrah or urrah-urrah, which is emitted upon arriving or when challenging other gannets at the colony. The call is shortened to a rah rah when fishing or collecting nesting material, and lengthened to a ooo-ah when taking off. The calls of the sexes are similar. According to Nelson, northern gannets can recognize the call of their breeding partner, their chicks and birds in neighbouring nests. Individuals from outside this sphere are treated with more aggression.

== Distribution and habitat ==
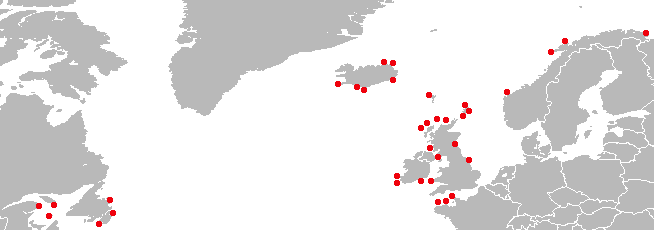
Red dots indicate breeding colonies in the North Atlantic

The northern gannet's breeding range is on both sides of the North Atlantic on coasts influenced by the Gulf Stream, There are colonies in the Gulf of Saint Lawrence and on the islands off the east coast of Canada. They normally nest in large colonies, on cliffs overlooking the ocean or on small rocky islands. The water needs to be cool enough for Atlantic mackerel and herring, which are the main food source for the northern gannet. These areas also overlie the continental shelf. Northern gannet colonies can be found in the far north in regions that are very cold and stormy, and Nelson has suggested that they can survive in these regions for several reasons, including the combination of body weight and a powerful beak that allows them to capture strong muscular fish, and the ability to dive to great depths and capture prey far from the cliffs. Their fat reserves act as weight when diving and as reserves during extended periods without food.

The northern limit of their breeding area depends on the presence of waters that are free of sea ice during the breeding season. Therefore, while Greenland and Svalbard offer suitable breeding sites, the Arctic regions have summers that are too short to allow the northern gannets to lay their eggs and raise a brood, which requires between 26 and 30 weeks. The southern limit of their distribution mainly depends on the presence of sufficient prey. There is fossil evidence of northern gannets breeding on Crete in the Pleistocene.

=== Breeding colonies ===
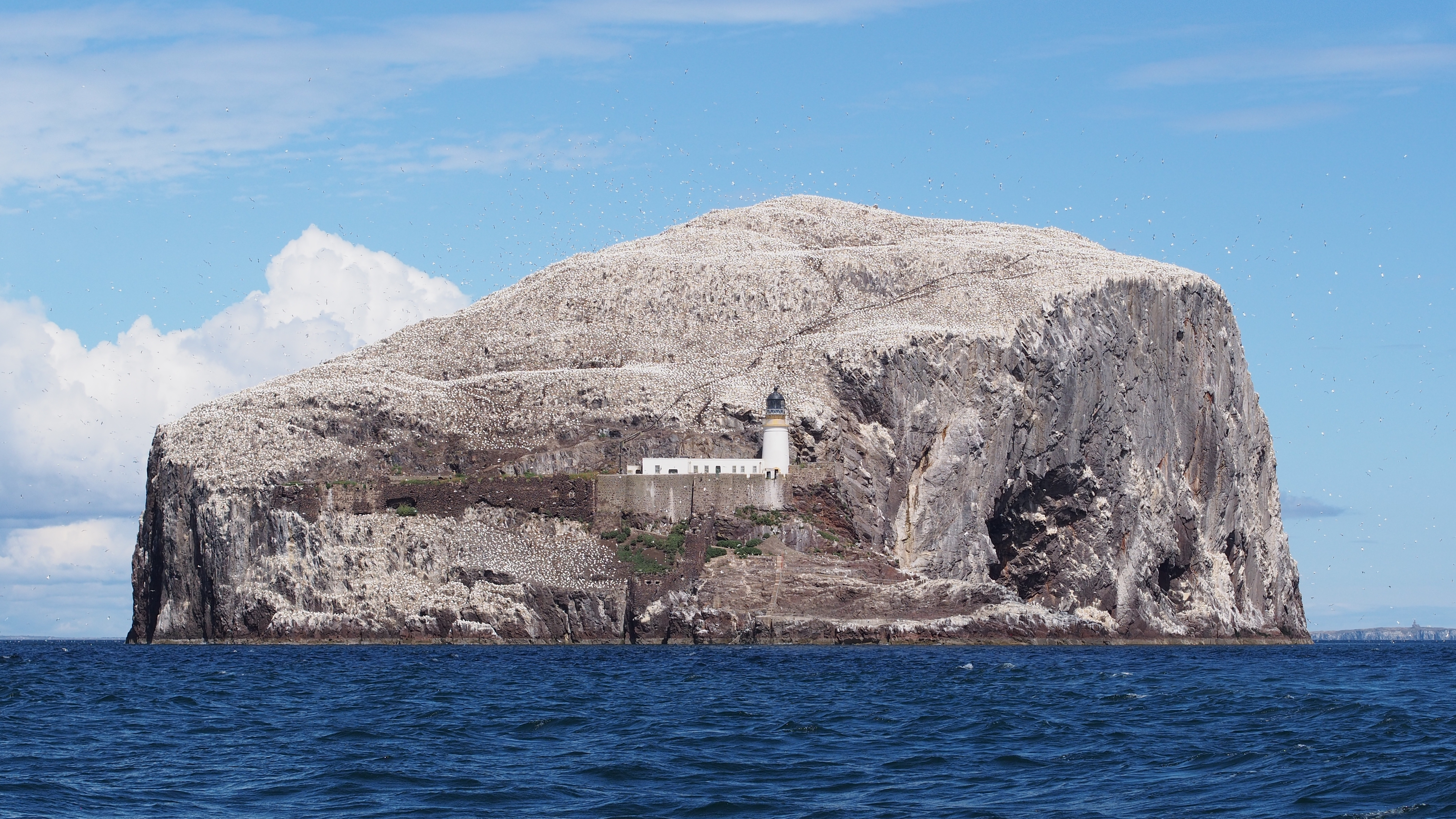
Bass Rock in the Firth of Forth, Scotland, is the world's largest colony.

Some northern gannet breeding colonies have been recorded as being located in the same place for hundreds of years. The cliffs containing the colonies appear white when seen from a distance, due to the number of nesting birds present on them. There is a written record of a colony on the island of Lundy from 1274. There were only 70 nests by 1871, and the colony finally disappeared by 1909 at the latest. More than two-thirds of the world population breeds around the coasts of the British Isles. Colonies include:

- Scotland

- Bass Rock, in the Firth of Forth, first recorded in 1493. In 2004, it contained more than 48,000 nests. By 2014 this had increased to over 75,000, making it the largest colony in the world.
- Northern gannets began a colony at Troup Head in Aberdeenshire in 1988, and by 2014 it held an estimated 6,456 pairs.
- Saint Kilda and Sula Sgeir, in the Hebrides, Scotland. The former colony was estimated at 60,290 pairs and the latter 11,230 pairs in 2013. A colony on the Flannan Isles almost doubled in size to 5,280 pairs in 2013. Further south, the island of Ailsa Craig in the Firth of Clyde hosted an estimated 33,226 pairs in 2014. Ailsa Craig has been known as a colony since 1583.
- In Shetland, there were an estimated 25,580 breeding pairs at Hermaness, 11,786 on Noss, and 3,591 on Fair Isle in 2013, while Orkney had an estimated 4,550 pairs at Sule Stack. Sule Skerry's breeding population rose from 57 to 1,870 pairs between 2003 and 2013.

- Wales

- Grassholm off the Pembrokeshire coast in Wales had an estimated 36,011 pairs in 2015. Gannets began nesting here between 1820 and 1860, though never in great numbers, only exceeding 300 pairs by 1913.

- England

- Bempton Cliffs hosted an estimated 12,494 pairs in 2015, more than tripling in size in 12 years.

- Ireland

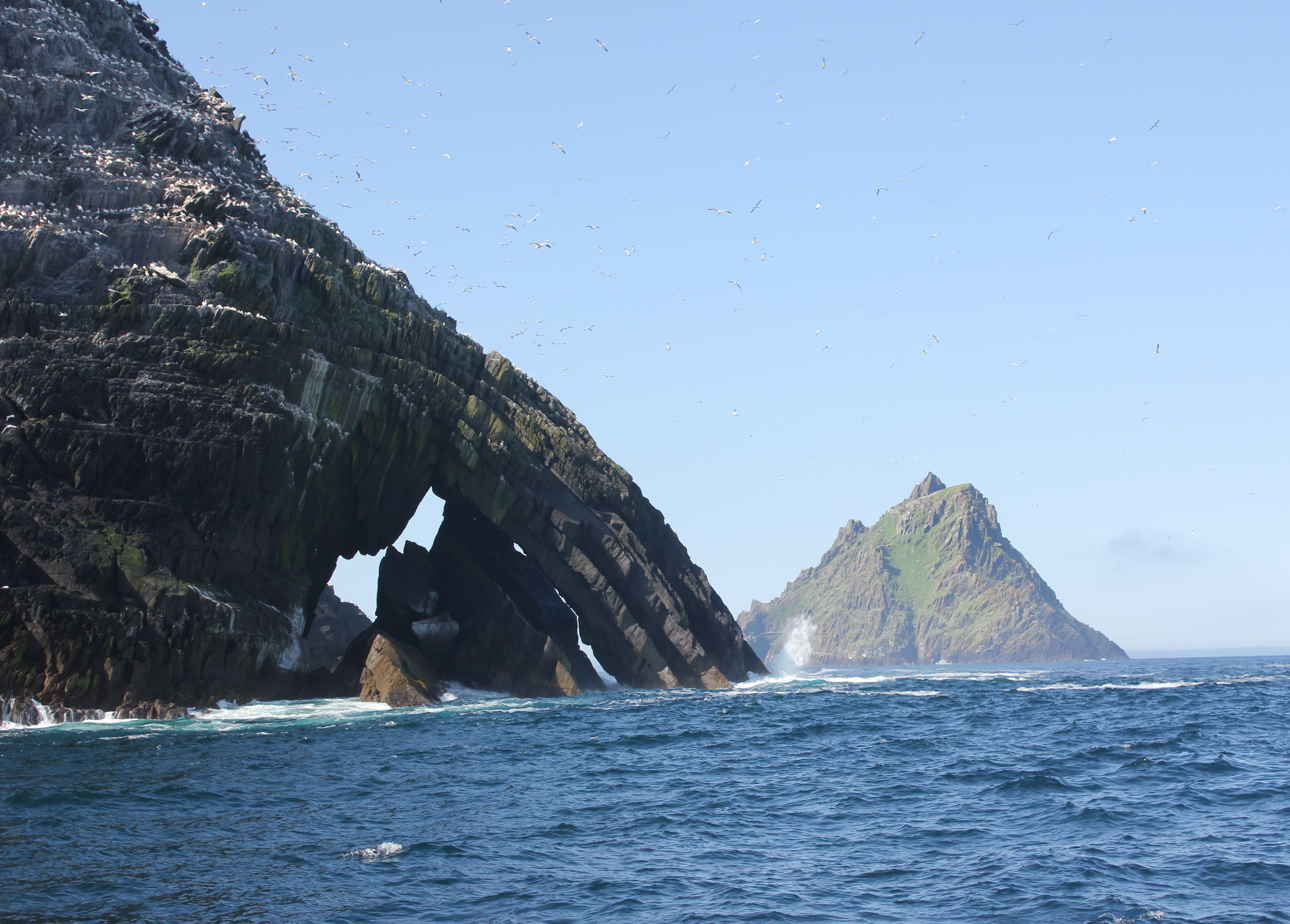
Northern gannet colony on Little Skellig, Ireland

- Little Skellig, a small island located about twelve kilometres (6 1/2 nautical miles) off the Iveragh Peninsula of County Kerry is the largest colony in Ireland, hosting around 30,000 breeding pairs. Known as a gannetry before 1700, human impact had reduced the population to 30 pairs by 1880 before rapidly increasing to around 10,000 pairs by 1906, the fastest recovery ever recorded at a gannet colony. There are small colonies on Ireland's southern coast, on Bull Rock, County Cork, Clare Island, County Mayo and Great Saltee Island, County Wexford.

- Alderney. Around 7,500 pairs nest on two islets—Ortac and Les Etacs—off the coast of Alderney in the English Channel, the first birds only nesting there in the 1940s. These birds migrate further south to the Mediterranean and west coast of Africa than more northerly breeding colonies.
- France. The French island of Rouzic in the Jentilez archipelago off the coast of Brittany hosts the southernmost breeding colony of northern gannets. Established in the late 1930s, it had grown to over 11,500 breeding pairs by 1995. Pairs have nested sporadically with varying success along the Mediterranean coast.
- Germany. Northern gannets have reappeared on Heligoland in 1991 and around 680 breeding pairs have been counted in 2016.
- Italy. A pair raised a chick successfully for three successive seasons from 2013 to 2015 on a moored boat at Porto Venere in northern Italy, after birds had been seen there since 1993.
- The Faroe Islands. Mykines in the Faroe Islands held about 2,000 breeding pairs in 2000, although that had risen to 2,500 pairs by 2014.
- Iceland. Eldey, a small island located about 16 kilometres (8 1/2 nautical miles) off the coast of the Reykjanesskagi Peninsula, Iceland, hosting around 16,300 breeding pairs in 1962, and a similar number in 2008. Iceland has several small colonies along its coast, and on Grimsey, around 40 km (20 nmi) north.
- Norway. As of 2016, there are an estimated 6,900 breeding pairs in Norway. Northern gannets first bred in the south of the country in the mid 1940s at Runde in Møre og Romsdal. In 1967 a colony was established at Syltefjord, within the Arctic Circle at 70°N. Colonies were also established on low islets in Lofoten and Vesterålen, but declined due to increasing numbers of white-tailed eagles. Once rare, these were protected in 1968 and their numbers have risen. It is unclear why the eagles have not impacted on gannet numbers further north. In 2011, gannets began breeding on Bear Island, southernmost island of Svalbard, likely due to the warming of the Barents Sea and influx of fish. The colony numbered 52 pairs in 2016.
- Russia. There are around 250 pairs in a colony at Kharlov on the Kola Peninsula in Russia. Established in 1995, this is also thought to be due to the warming of the Barents Sea.
- North America. There are six breeding colonies along the coast of Canada. The Gulf of Saint Lawrence hosts three colonies—Bonaventure Island, Bird Rocks and Anticosti Island—and there are three off the eastern and southeastern coast of Newfoundland (Cape St. Mary's Ecological Reserve, Funk Island, Baccalieu Island Ecological Reserve. Bonaventure Island off the south coast of the Gaspé Peninsula of Quebec is the largest colony with 60,000 nests as of 2009.

=== Migration ===
After the breeding season, adult northern gannets disperse over a wide area although they travel no more than 800 to 1,600 km (450 to 850 nmi) from the breeding colony. It is not known if all birds from one colony migrate to the same over-wintering area. Many adults migrate to the west of the Mediterranean, passing over the Strait of Gibraltar and flying over land as little as possible. Other birds follow Africa's Atlantic coastline to arrive in the Gulf of Guinea. Immature northern gannets from colonies in Canada fly to the Gulf of Mexico, much further south than the adults. The immature gannets migrate southwards for great distances and have been recorded as far south as Ecuador. In their second year some birds return to the colony in which they were born, where they arrive later than the mature birds. They then migrate south again at the end of the breeding season, but travel shorter distances in this second migration. Gannets from Alderney have been tracked since 2015 to gain better knowledge of their movements. One individual was found to have travelled from its colony in Alderney to Scandinavian waters, a round trip of around 2,700 km (1,500 nmi).

The species has been recorded as a vagrant in many central and eastern European countries as far south and west as the Black Sea, and also in Bermuda, Cuba, Cyprus, Egypt, Kazakhstan, Jan Mayen and Syria. In February 2016, one was recorded from Ceará in northeastern Brazil—the first sighting in the Southern Hemisphere.

== Behaviour ==
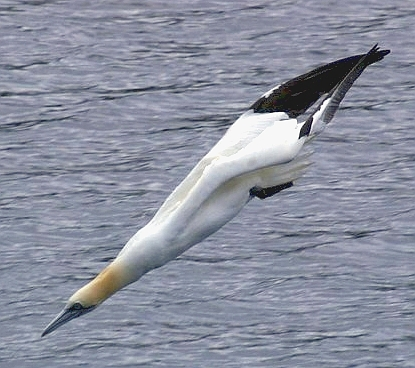
Plunge-diving with wings retracted

The wings of the northern gannet are long and narrow and are positioned towards the front of the body, allowing efficient use of air currents when flying. Even in calm weather they can attain velocities of between 55 and 65 km/h (30 and 35 kn) although their flying muscles are relatively small: in other birds, flying muscles make up around 20% of total weight, while in northern gannets the flying muscles are less than 13%. Despite their speed, they cannot manoeuvre in flight as well as other seabirds. Northern gannets need to warm up before flying. They also walk with difficulty, and this means that they have problems getting airborne from a flat area. They take off from water by facing into the wind and strongly beating their wings. In light winds and high waves they are sometimes unable to take off, and they can become beached.

Northern gannets alight on land using angled wings, fanned tail and raised feet to control their speed, not always successfully, since damaged or broken wings were recorded as a frequent cause of death in adults at one colony.

=== Feeding ===
Northern gannets forage for food during the day, generally by diving at high speed into the sea. They search for food both near to their nesting sites but also further out to sea. Birds that are feeding young have been recorded searching for food up to 320 km (170 nmi) from their nest. It has been found that 2% of birds nesting in the colony on Bass Rock search for fish at Dogger Bank, between 280 and 320 km (150 and 170 nmi) away. It is likely that they fly further than this while foraging, possibly up to double the distance; normally they fly less than 150 km (80 nmi). Some studies have found that the duration and direction of flights made while foraging for food are similar for both sexes, although there are significant differences in the search behaviour of males and females. Female northern gannets are not only more selective than males in choosing a search area: they also make longer and deeper dives and spend more time floating on the surface than males.

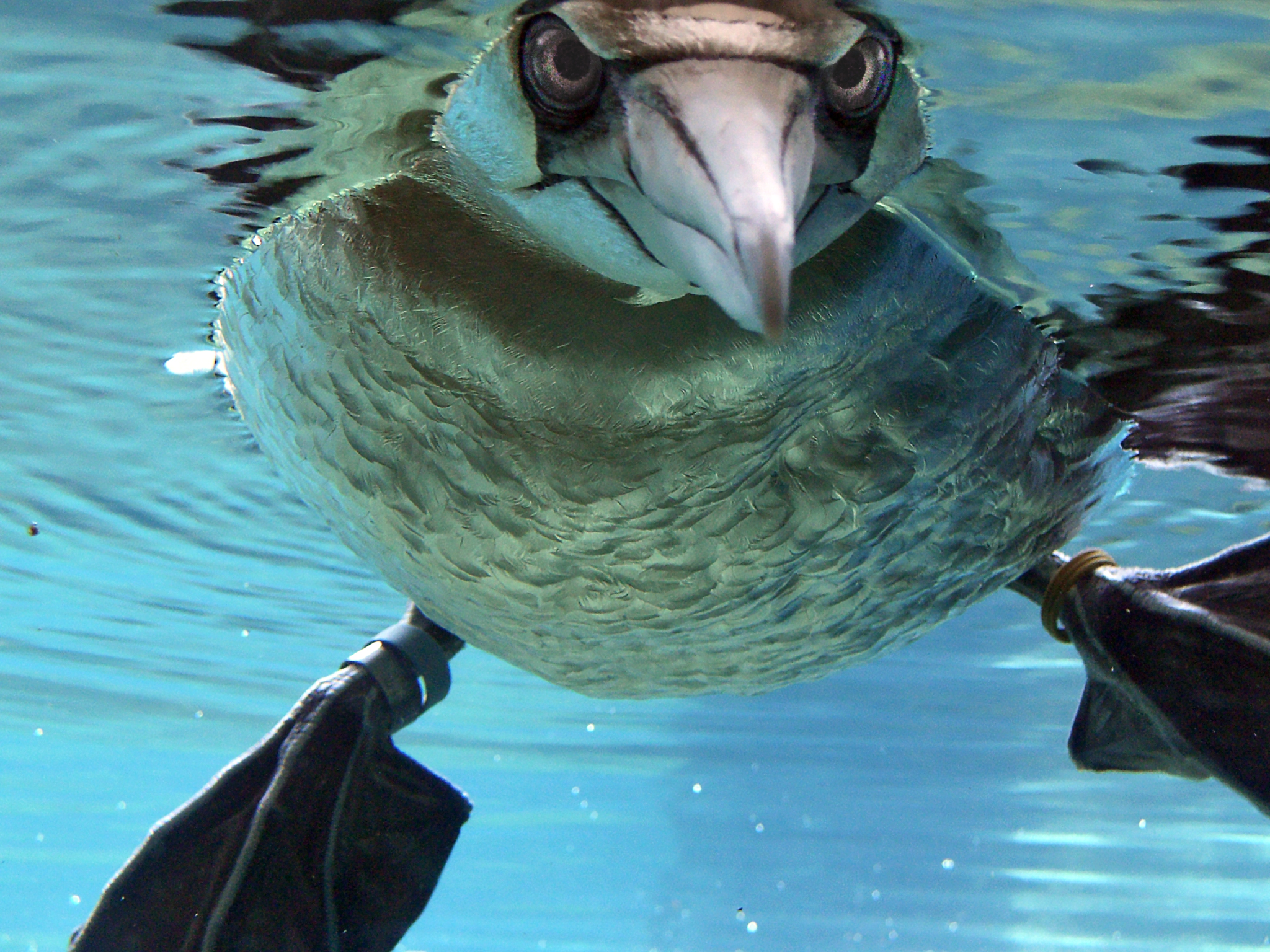
Searching for fish in a zoo

Gannets will follow fishing boats or cetaceans to find discarded or injured fish. They forage from heights of up to 70 m (230 ft) with no clear preference, and typically dive between 11 and 60 m (35 and 195 ft). They dive with their bodies straight and rigid, wings tucked close to the body but angled back, extending beyond the tail, before piercing the water like an arrow. They control the direction of the dive using their wings and tail, and fold their wings against the body just before impact. Birds can hit the water at speeds of up to 100 km/h (30 m/s). This allows them to penetrate up to 11 m (36 ft) below the surface, and they will swim down to an average 19.7 m (60 ft), sometimes deeper than 25 m (80 ft). The bird's subcutaneous air sacs may have a role in controlling their buoyancy.

Gannets usually push their prey deeper into the water and capture it as they return to the surface. When a dive is successful, they swallow the fish underwater before surfacing, and never fly with the fish in their bill. Larger fish are swallowed headfirst, smaller fish are swallowed sideways or tail-first. The fish is stored in a branched bag in the throat and does not cause drag when in flight. Their white colour helps other gannets to identify one of their kind, and they can deduce the presence of a shoal of fish by this diving behaviour; this in turn facilitates group foraging, which makes capturing their prey easier. The colour also makes the gannet less visible to the fish underneath. Northern gannets also forage for fish while swimming with their head under water.

They eat mainly fish 2.5–30.5 cm (1–12 in) in length that shoal near the surface. Virtually any small fish (roughly 80–90% of their diet) or other small pelagic species (largely squid) will be taken opportunistically. Sardines, anchovies, haddock, smelt, Atlantic cod and other shoal-forming species are also eaten. M. bassanus takes huge quantities from the waters around Newfoundland for the energy requirements of their growing chicks. Given the economic importance of the prey taken, whether they are in competition with human fishing industry in the area is an important question which remains unassessed. (But given the small amount taken, NL's cod take is probably unaffected.) On the other hand, they profit off of discarded bycatch and processed parts and the reduction in competition if humans are taking predatory fish.

M. bassanus inflicts significant wastage on the northwest Atlantic Salmo salar fishery, but does not actually eat much of them. This makes it difficult to resolve this conflict with the fishing industry in the area, as the only option would be to exterminate the birds, which is ecologically unacceptable. (Note: p. 542, "A recent...")

=== Breeding ===
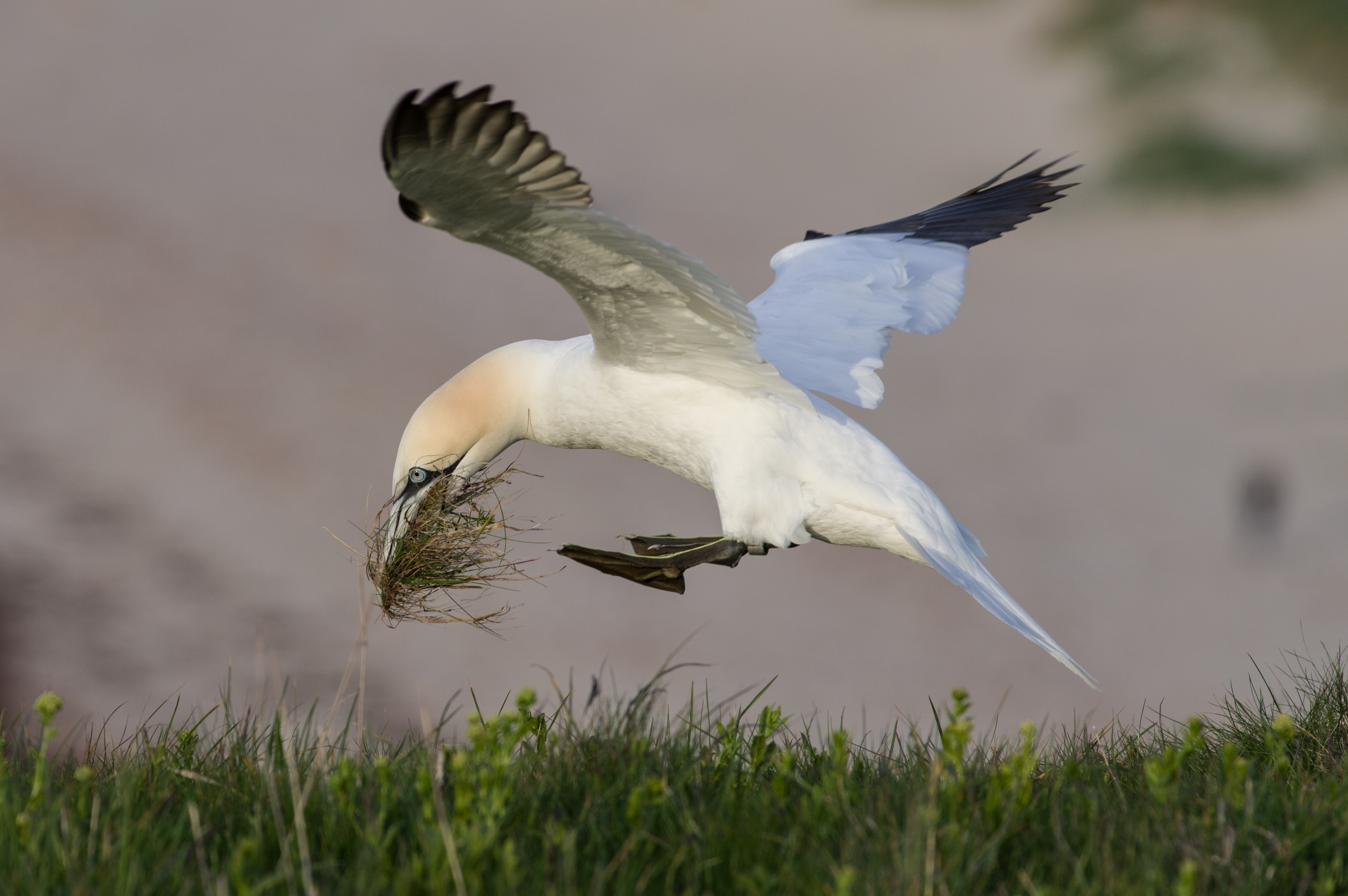
Transporting material for the nest

The oldest birds are the first to return to the northern gannet's breeding colonies. Birds not of breeding age arrive a few weeks later. In general, birds first return to a colony (not uncommonly the one in which they were hatched) when they are two or three years old. Once an individual has successfully bred in a colony, it will not normally change to another. Nesting starts in March or April.

Immature birds stay on the edges of the colony. They may even make a nest but they do not breed until they are 4 or 5 years old. Some birds of this age occupy empty nests that they will aggressively defend if they have sat on them for two or three days. If an apparently empty nest has an owner, the immature bird will leave without a struggle when the owner arrives to take possession.

The preferred nesting sites are on coastal hillsides or cliffs. If these are not available, northern gannets will nest in groups on islands or flat surfaces. As they find it more difficult to take off from such locations, they will often cross the area occupied by an adjacent nest causing an aggressive reaction from the sitting pair; this means that the stress levels are higher in this type of colony than in those on steeper surfaces. Notwithstanding this, nests are always built close together, and otherwise ideal nesting sites will not be used if they are some distance from a colony. On average there are 2.3 nests per square metre (1.9 per square yard). Both sexes fiercely defend the area around their nest. Where space allows, the distance between nests is double the reach of an individual.

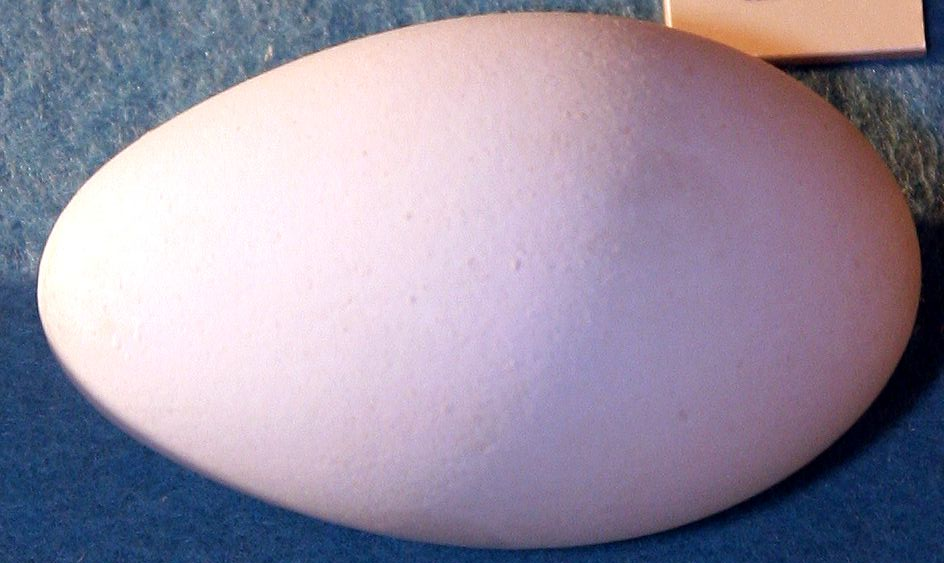
Egg

Nests are made from seaweed, plants, earth and debris from the sea. The males usually collect the materials. Nests are compact cups typically 30–60 cm (12–24 in) in height. The area which a nest occupies grows throughout the breeding season as the breeding pairs throw their excrement outside the nest. Over years, nests can reach 2 m (6 1/2 ft) in height.

Northern gannets lay one egg that on average weighs 104.5 g (3 5/8 oz), which is light for such a large seabird. The egg is around 79 mm (3 1/8 in) long by 50 mm (2 in) wide, and the shell is pale blue and translucent initially before fading to a chalky white surface that is easily stained. M. bassanus was among those birds most affected by the shell-thinning effect of DDT, which contributed in large degree to its ban. (Note: p. 502, "...Sula bassanus...") Where two eggs are found in a nest, this is the result of two females laying an egg in the same nest or one egg being stolen from another nest. Northern gannets will lay a replacement egg if the first is lost. Incubation takes 42 to 46 days, during which time the egg is surrounded by the brooding bird's warm, webbed feet. Just before hatching begins, the brooding bird releases the egg from its feet to prevent the egg from breaking under the adult's weight as the chick breaks it open. This is a frequent cause of death for chicks of birds that are breeding for the first time. The process of breaking the eggshell can take up to 36 hours. The webbed feet are also used to cover the chicks, which are only rarely left alone by their parents. Chicks that are left unattended are often attacked and killed by other northern gannets.

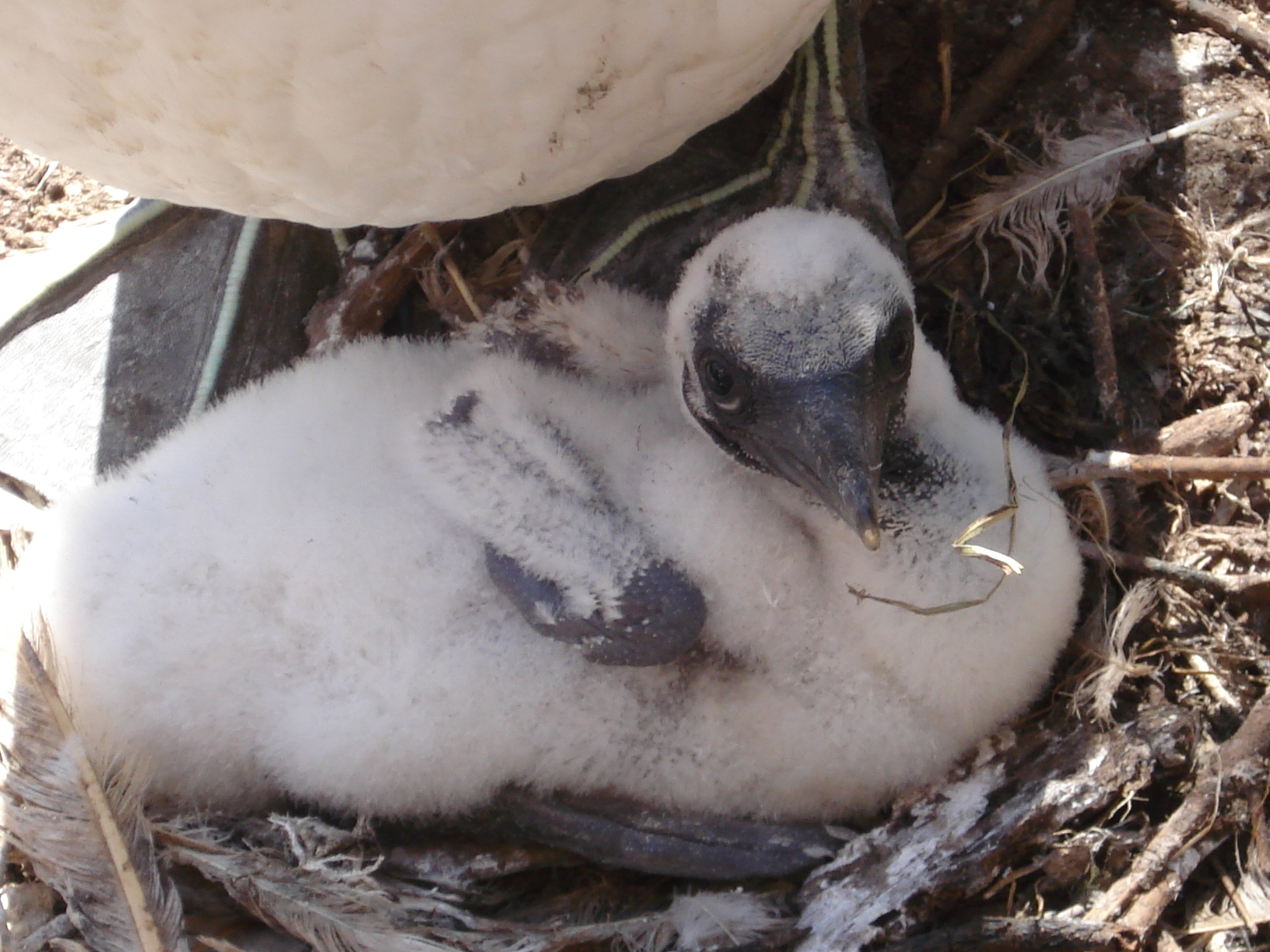
A downy chick

Newly hatched chicks are featherless and are dark blue or black in colour. In the second week of life they are covered in white down, replaced over the next five weeks by dark brown feathers flecked with white. Young chicks are fed regurgitated semi-digested fish by their parents, who open their mouths wide for their young to fetch the food from the back of their throats. Older chicks receive whole fish. Unlike the chicks of other species, northern gannet chicks do not move about the nest or flap their wings to ask for food: this reduces the likelihood that they will fall from the nest.

The adults feed their offspring for around 13 weeks, right up until the time they leave. The young birds fledge between 84 and 97 days old, departing by launching themselves off a cliff and flying—a procedure which is impossible to practice beforehand. If they leave the nest in bad weather, they can be mortally wounded as they can be blown against the rocks. The young birds are attacked by adults if unattended. Once they leave the nest, they stay at sea learning to fish and fly, their flight skills being too poor for them to return to the breeding ledges.

Northern gannets have only one brood a year. The survival rate for young birds for their first four years is 30% and the annual survival rate for adults is 91.9%. The typical lifespan after becoming adult is 17 years, and the maximum known age is 37 years 4 months 16 days. Gannet pairs are monogamous and may remain together over several seasons, if not for all of their lives. The pairs separate when their chicks leave the nest, but they bond again the following year. Should one of the pair die, the other bird will find another mate.

=== Displays ===
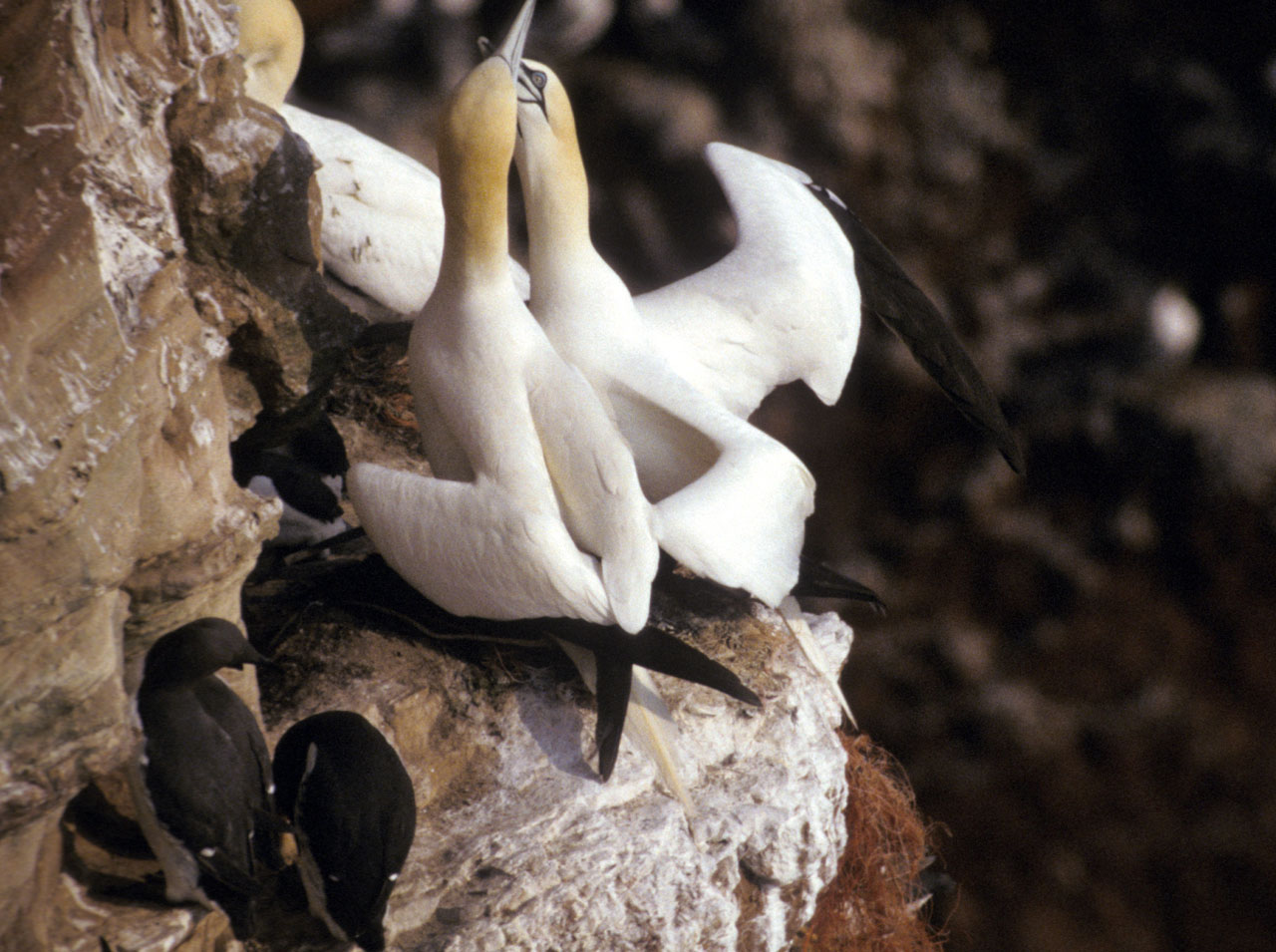
"Fencing" or "billing", a mutual greeting gesture

Two northern gannets greeting each other

Northern gannets exhibit many types of aggressive behaviour while they are nesting. Confrontations normally only take place between birds of the same sex. Females will lower their heads before an aggressive male that is defending its nest: this will expose the back of the female's neck, and the male will take it in its beak and expel the female from the nest. A female will not react if a male approaches a nest, but it will react fiercely if another female approaches. The fights between males occupying nests for the first time are particularly intense. Such fights can last for up to two hours and lead to serious injuries. Birds lunge at each other and lock bills, wrestling for extended periods while neighbours peck at them. The fights are preceded by threatening gestures, which are also seen outside the breeding season. Males demonstrate ownership of a nest by gesturing towards their neighbours in a bowing display; their heads and beaks point down, and their wings are held up and away from the body, yet folded backward. The male moves his head from side to side before bowing forwards.

Males try to attract an available female after establishing a territory. The females will fly over the colony several times before landing. Their posture, with the neck stretched out, tells the male that they are available for courtship. The male will then shake their heads in a similar way to when they are guarding their nest, but with their wings closed. Mated pairs engage in a fencing display when the male arrives back at the nest. The two birds stand breast to breast with wings spread and bills extended vertically. They fence and scissor with their bills rapidly, calling loudly at the same time. Fencing is interspersed with bill bowing.

== Predators and parasites ==
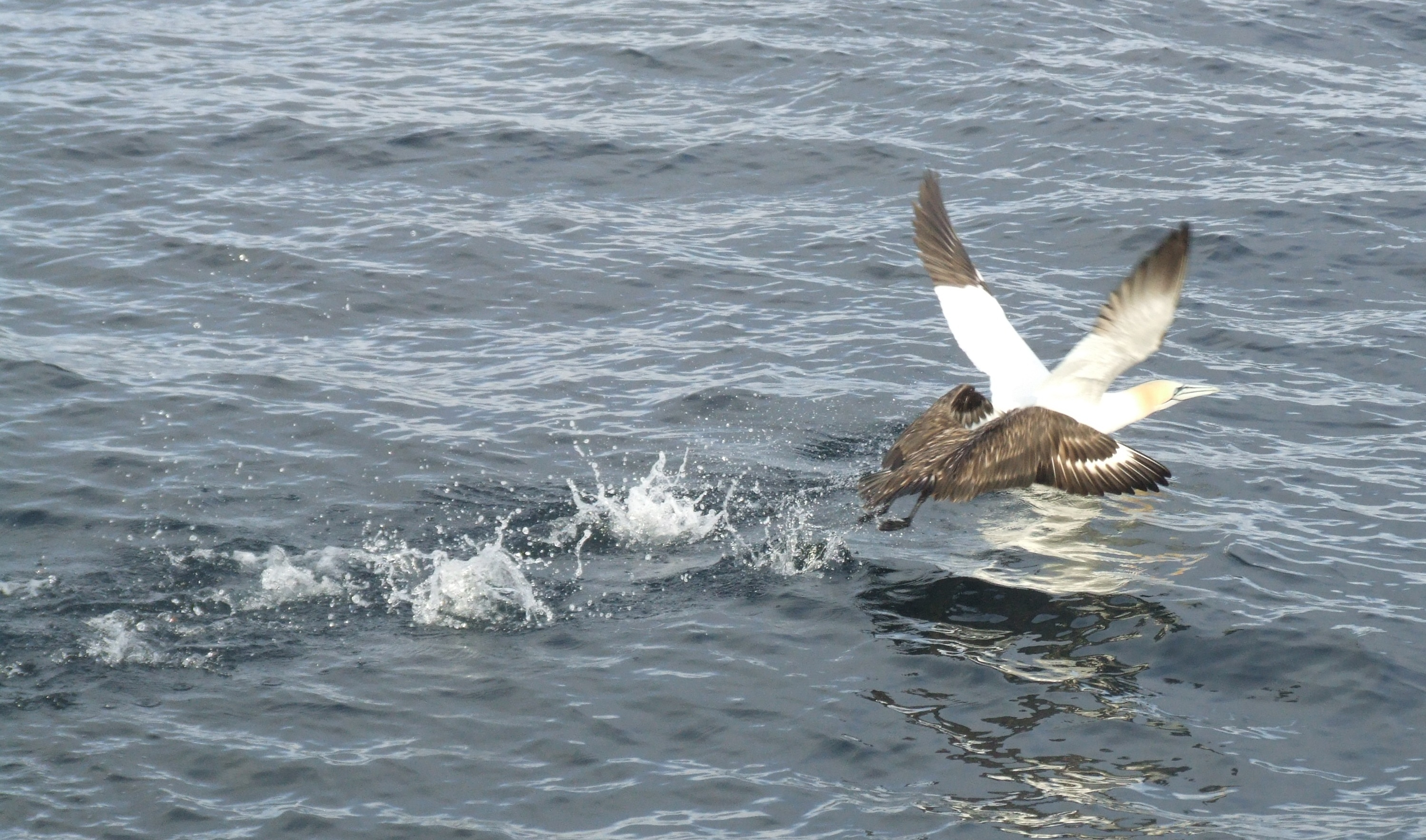
A great skua robbing a gannet

The northern gannet is not heavily predated. The only known habitual natural predators of adults are bald eagles, white-tailed eagles and golden eagles. Predators of eggs and nestlings include the great black-backed gull and American herring gull, common ravens, ermine, and red fox. Attacks at sea are insignificant, though large sharks and seals may rarely snatch a gannet out at sea.

Kleptoparasitism by skuas, particularly the great skua, occurs at breeding sites. The skua chases its victim until it disgorges its stomach contents, providing a meal for the attacker. Skuas may catch the tip of the gannet's wing, causing it to fall into the sea, or seize the tail to tip its victim into the water. The gannet is only released when it has regurgitated its catch.

External parasites include feather lice, although there are relatively few species and none are found on the head. As with grebes and divers, it may be that the short head feathers provide insufficient cover for the parasite. In one species, Michaelichus bassani, immature lice are found in the membranes lining the subcutaneous air-cells. Ixodes mites include the widespread I. uriae.

The spiny-headed worm Corynosoma tunitae appears to occur only in gannets and closely related seabird families such as the cormorants. The tapeworm Tetrabothrius bassani absorbs toxic heavy metals at a higher concentration than the gannet's own tissues, with an average 12 times as much cadmium as the gannet's pectoral muscles and 7–10 times the lead level of the bird's kidney and liver. Since levels of these toxic metals are detectable in the parasite earlier than in the host, the tapeworm might be used as an early indicator of marine pollution.

== Threats and conservation status ==
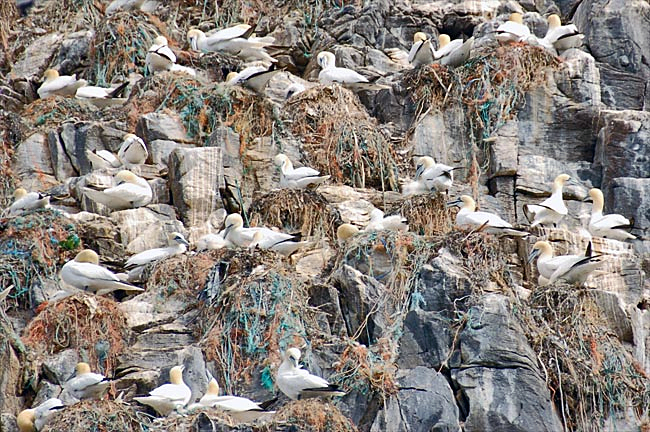
Nests among the rocks. The population of this species appears to be increasing.

A 2004 survey counted 45 gannet breeding colonies and some 361,000 nests. The population is apparently growing between 3% and 5% a year, although this growth is concentrated in just a few colonies. Although northern gannet populations are now stable, their numbers were once greatly reduced due to loss of habitat, removal of eggs and killing of adults for their meat and feathers. In 1939, there were 22 colonies and some 83,000 nests, which means that the populations have increased fourfold since that time.

In 1992, the International Union for Conservation of Nature (IUCN) estimated the bird's population to be some 526,000. After taking into account an estimate produced for BirdLife International in 2004 of the European population, the IUCN revised its global population to between 950,000 and 1,200,000 individuals.

The IUCN lists northern gannets as a species of least concern, as they are widely distributed and as there is a large population that appears to be growing due to high breeding success, with 75% of eggs producing fledged young.

Despite this classification, the 2022 H5N1 outbreak caused mass mortality at northern gannet colonies across the North Atlantic. Unusually high mortality was recorded at 40 colonies, representing about 75% of all known colonies. At Bass Rock, the number of occupied nest sites fell by at least 71%, and breeding success was approximately 66% below the long-term UK mean. The longer-term consequences for the global population remained uncertain, and continued monitoring was considered necessary to assess its recovery.

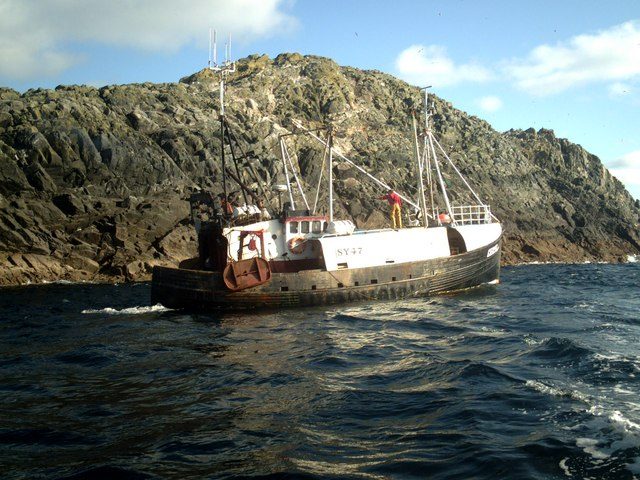
The Heather Isle collecting guga hunters from Sula Sgeir

=== Hunting through history ===
Northern gannets have long been eaten by humans. Birds, mainly the young, were taken from Bass Rock for at least 350 years until 1885, when the annual cull of about 1,500 individuals finally ceased, and Shetland gannets were sold as "Highland goose" in London restaurants during World War II. Views of the palatability of this bird are mixed, but as well as being a food for the poor it also regularly featured in Scottish royal banquets. In Scotland, gannets were traditionally salted to preserve them until they got to market, this technique being replaced by partially cooking or smoking in the era of modern transport. They are normally served roasted, although sometimes raw when pickled or dried.

Although the Bass Rock population fell to fewer than 4,000 pairs in the early 19th century, the population soon recovered once hunting ceased, and St. Kilda was harvested sustainably for hundreds of years. Elsewhere, the recovery was less complete. The Bird Rocks colony in the Gulf of St Lawrence may once have held 250,000 birds, but unchecked hunting, including for fish bait, meant that the population was only 1,000 birds by 1932, despite government protection since 1904.

==== St Kilda ====
Among the best-known sites for harvesting historically was the remote island of St Kilda, where adults and eggs were taken in the spring. The fat chicks, known locally as "gugas", were harvested from the precipitous cliffs in August, just before they could fly, and thrown to waiting boats far below. Much of the meat was salted in barrels for storage, but the rest of the bird was also used. Islanders paid their rent in feathers for stuffing pillows and furniture, the gannet stomachs were used to hold oil derived from the carcasses, and the breastbones served as lamp wicks. Hunting on St Kilda ceased in 1910.

==== Sula Sgeir ====
The gannetry on Sula Sgeir is still exploited under a licence that permits 2,200 chicks to be taken each year. During the hunt, 10 men live on the island, and the cleaned birds are singed on a fire fuelled by their own oil-rich offal. The men typically come from the Ness area of the Isle of Lewis. The filleted birds are then taken to Stornoway, where each hunter receives 200 skins to give away or sell. The practice was described at length as part of the story in The Blackhouse, a novel by Scottish writer Peter May. The continuing practice of hunting and eating gannets attracts criticism in some quarters. The island's name "Sula Sgeir" itself derives from sula, meaning "gannet", and the Old Norse skerr, a skerry. Other sites that continued hunting into the 20th century were Eldey in Iceland, where the activity ceased in 1939, and Mykines, where small-scale culling still persists. About 500 young are culled for consumption each year in Mykines, using techniques similar to those of the Sula Sgeir hunts.

== In culture ==
=== Mythology ===
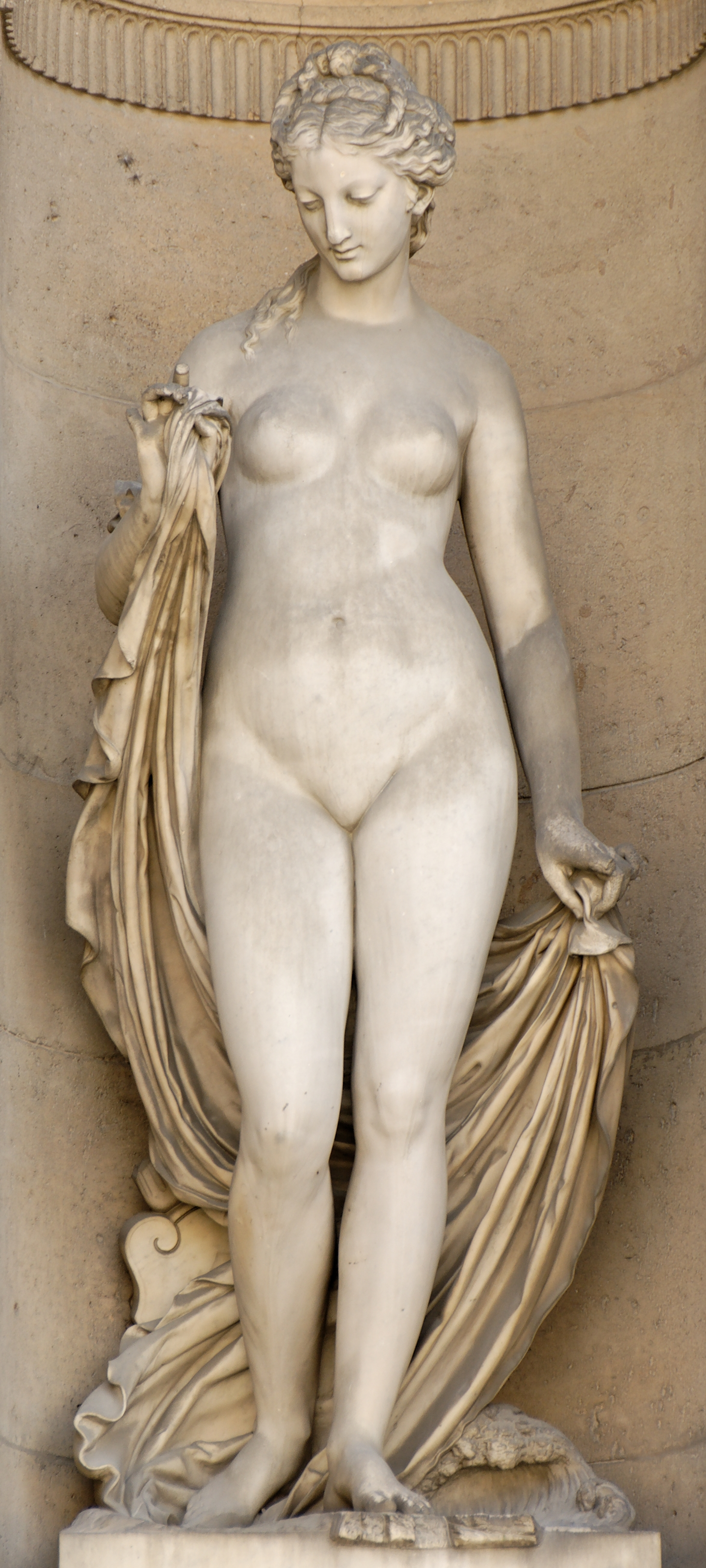
Leucothea by Jean Jules Allasseur (1862)

In Homer's Odyssey, the sea goddess Leucothea (Greek: Λευκοθέα "white goddess"), appears "in the likeness of a Gannet" and tells the shipwrecked Odysseus to discard his cloak and raft, instead offering him her veil to wind round himself which will save his life and enable him to reach land.

Another early reference to the gannet is in the 7th-century Old English epic poem The Seafarer. (Note: þær ic ne gehyrde butan hlimman sæ/ iscaldne wæg Hwilum ylfete song/ dyde ic me to gomene ganotes hleoþor/ ond huilpan sweg fore hleahtor wera/ mæw singende fore medodrince. This translation by James Fisher.)

There I heard naught but seething sea,
Ice-cold wave, awhile a song of swan
Then came to charm me gannets' pother
And whimbrels trills for laughter of men,
Kittiwake singing instead of mead.

An old myth from Mykines in the Faroe Islands tells of the giant Tórur seeking mercy following defeat at the hands of Óli, the islanders' head man and magician. In return, he gave them whales, driftwood logs and a bird unique to the archipelago, on condition that the inhabitants did not laugh at his gifts. Over time, the islanders forgot their promise, and lost the whales and logs, but fearful of losing a valuable food source, they never mocked the gannets that Tórur had given them.

=== Euro redesign ===
With the help of a Motifs Advisory Group, the Governing Council of the European Central Bank selected the "northern gannet flying over big ocean waves" as a potential front motif for the 2020s redesign of the 200€ banknote, with the reverse featuring the building of the European Court of Auditors.

== General and cited references ==
- Attenborough, David (1998). The Life of Birds. London: British Broadcasting Corporation. ISBN 978-0-563-38792-3.
- Broom, Donald M. (2009). Biology of Behaviour: Mechanisms, functions and applications. Cambridge: Cambridge University Press. ISBN 978-0-521-29906-0.
- Cocker, Mark (2005). Birds Britannica. London: Chatto & Windus. ISBN 978-0-7011-6907-7.
- Cocker, Mark (2013). Birds and People. London: Jonathan Cape. ISBN 978-0-224-08174-0.
- Cramp, Stanley; Simmons, Ken E. L. (1977). Handbook of the Birds of Europe, the Middle East, and North Africa: The Birds of the Western Palearctic. Vol. I: Ostrich to Ducks. Oxford: Oxford University Press. ISBN 978-0-19-857358-6.
- Dempsey, Eric; O'Clery, Michael (2002). The Complete Guide to Ireland's Birds (2 ed.). Dublin: Gill Books. ISBN 978-0-7171-3401-4.
- Flack, Leah Culligan (2015). Modernism and Homer: The Odysseys of H.D., James Joyce, Osip Mandelstam, and Ezra Pound. Cambridge: Cambridge University Press. ISBN 978-1-107-10803-5.
- Fowler, Robert (2004). The Cambridge Companion to Homer. Cambridge Companions to Literature. Cambridge: Cambridge University Press. ISBN 978-0-521-01246-1.
- Gessner, Conrad (1560). Icones avivm omnivm (in Latin). Zurich: Excvudebat C. Froschovervus.
- Gurney, John Henry (1903). The Gannet: a Bird with a History. London: Witherby.
- Haswell-Smith, Hamish (2004). The Scottish Islands. Edinburgh: Canongate. ISBN 978-1-84195-454-7.
- Hume, Rob; Pearson, Bruce (1993). Seabirds. Hamlyn Bird Behaviour Guides. London: Hamlyn. ISBN 978-0-600-57951-9.
- Jobling, James A. (2010). The Helm Dictionary of Scientific Bird Names. London: Christopher Helm. ISBN 978-1-4081-2501-4.
- Linnaeus, Carl (1758). Systema Naturae per Regna Tria Naturae, Secundum Classes, Ordines, Genera, Species, cum Characteribus, Differentiis, Synonymis, Locis (in Latin). Vol. I (10th revised ed.). Stockholm, Sweden: (Laurentii Salvii).
- Lockwood, W. B. (1993). The Oxford Dictionary of British Bird Names. Oxford: Oxford University Press. ISBN 978-0-19-866196-2.
- Nelson, J. Bryan (2010) [1978]. The Gannet. London: A&C Black. ISBN 978-1-4081-3857-1.
- Nelson, J. Bryan (2005). Pelicans, Cormorants and their relatives. Oxford: Oxford University Press. ISBN 978-0-19-857727-0.
- Polaszek, Andrew (2010). Systema Naturae 250 – The Linnaean Ark. Boca Raton, Florida: CRC Press. ISBN 978-1-4200-9502-9.
- Rothschild, Miriam; Clay, Theresa (1957). Fleas, Flukes and Cuckoos. A study of bird parasites. New York: Macmillan.
- Schreiber, E. A.; Burger, Joanna, eds. (2001-08-16). Biology of Marine Birds. CRC Press. p. 740. doi:10.1201/9781420036305. hdl:10.1201/9781420036305. ISBN 978-0-429-12786-1. S2CID 86083805.
- Taylor, Marianne (2016). RSPB Seabirds. London: Bloomsbury. ISBN 978-1-4729-0901-5.
- Vieillot, Louis Pierre (1816). Analyse d'une nouvelle ornithologie élémentaire (in French). Paris: Déterville.
- Weaver, Peter (2010) [1981]. The Birdwatcher's Dictionary. London: Bloomsbury Publishing. ISBN 978-1-4081-3852-6.
- Willughby, Francis (1681). The Ornithology of Francis Willughby of Middleton in the County of Warwick, esq. ... London: A.C. for John Martyn.
