= Nordfjord, Finnmark =

Nordfjord Syltefjord
- Abandoned Village
- View of the village
- Interactive map of Nordfjord
- Location within Finnmark Location within Norway
- Coordinates: 70°33′01.7″N 30°04′50.7″E
- Country: Norway
- Region: Northern Norway
- County: Finnmark
- District: Øst-Finnmark
- Municipality: Båtsfjord
- Elevation: 1 m (3.3 ft)
- Time zone: UTC+01:00 (CET)
  - Summer (DST): UTC+02:00 (CEST)

Nordfjord or Syltefjord is an abandoned fishing village in Båtsfjord Municipality in Finnmark county, Norway. The village is located along the Syltefjorden, about 30 kilometres (19 mi) east of the village of Båtsfjord. Nordfjord was formerly a trading post in the municipality, and it had a shop, school, Syltefjord Chapel, and a private post office. This village had Norway's highest zip code, 9992 Syltefjord, but it was discontinued in 1989 when the village was abandoned. Today, Nordfjord is used mostly for tourism and summer cottages. From Nordfjord, tourists can take sightseeing trips to the nearby seabird colonies at Stauran along the Syltefjorden.
