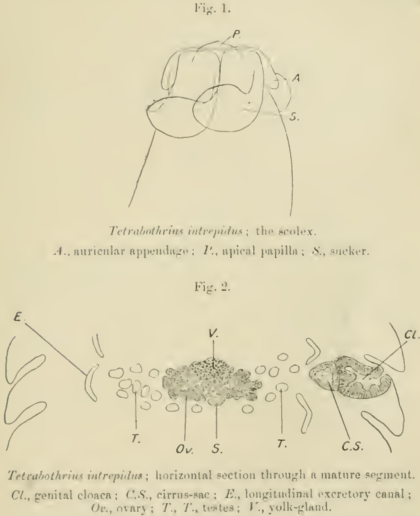
- Tetrabothrius intrepidus

Scientific classification
- Kingdom: Animalia
- Phylum: Platyhelminthes
- Class: Cestoda
- Subclass: Eucestoda
- Order: Tetrabothriidea; Baer, 1954
- Family: Tetrabothriidae; Linton, 1891

= Tetrabothriidae =

Order of tapeworms

Tetrabothriidea is an order of helminths in the class Cestoda. It consists of only one family, Tetrabothriidae. Their hosts are mainly seabirds, the rest being cetaceans and pinnipeds.

== Genera ==
All of the genera of Tetrabothriidea are in the family Tetrabothriidae.

- Anophryocephalus Baylis, 1922
- Chaetophallus Nybelin, 1916
- Priapocephalus Nybelin, 1922
- Strobilocephalus Baer, 1932
- Tetrabothrius Rudolphi, 1819
- Trigonocotyle Baer, 1932
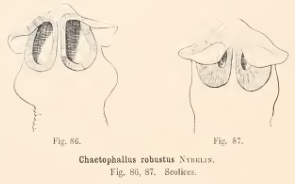
Chaetophallus robustus scolices

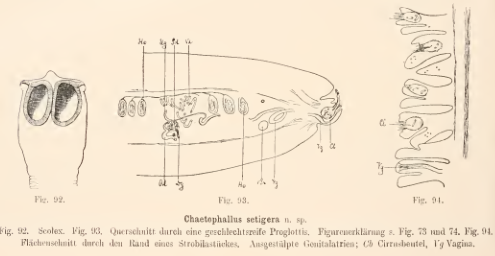
Chaetophallus setigera

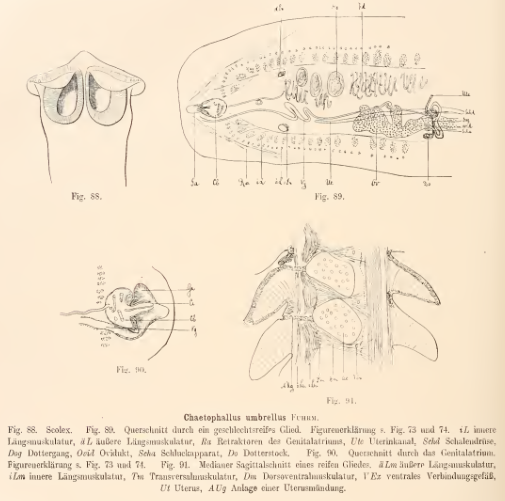
Chaetophallus umbrellus

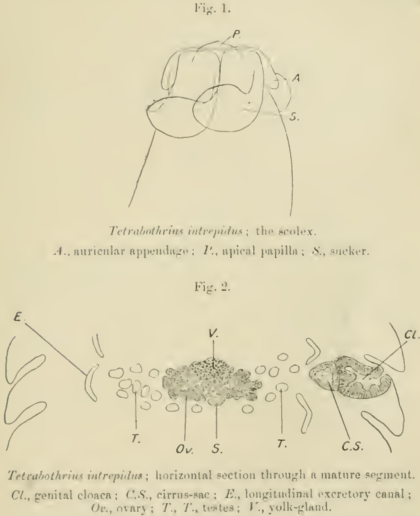
Tetrabothrius intrepidus
