= Syltefjorden (Finnmark) =

Fjord in Norway

Syltefjorden (Norwegian); Oardovuonna (Northern Sami)
- View of the abandoned fishing village of Nordfjord, located on the shore of the Syltefjorden
- Interactive map of the fjord
- Location: Finnmark county, Norway
- Coordinates: 70.5467°N 30.2220°E
- Type: Fjord
- Primary inflows: River Syltefjordelva
- Primary outflows: Barents Sea
- Basin countries: Norway
- Max. length: 16 kilometres (9.9 mi)
- Max. width: 5 kilometres (3.1 mi)

Syltefjorden (Norwegian) or Oardovuonna (Northern Sami) is a fjord in Båtsfjord Municipality in Finnmark county, Norway. The 16-kilometre (9.9 mi) long fjord flows from the river Syltefjordelva on the large Varanger Peninsula into the Barents Sea. The Varangerhalvøya National Park lies just south of the fjord.

Historically, there were three fishing villages located around the fjord: Nordfjord, Hamna, and Ytre Syltefjord. All three villages were abandoned during the 20th century. Along the northern shore of the fjord lies the large Syltefjordstauran mountain. The mountain is home to a very large bird colony that is popular among tourists.
